= List of municipalities in Oklahoma =

Map of the United States with Oklahoma highlighted

Oklahoma is a state located in the Southern United States.

Oklahoma is the 28th-most populous state with 3,959,353 inhabitants but the 19th-largest by land area spanning 68,595.92 square miles (177,662.6 km^{2}) of land. Oklahoma is divided into 77 counties and contains 597 municipalities consisting of cities and towns.

In Oklahoma, cities are all those communities which are 1,000 or more in population and are incorporated as cities. Towns are limited to town board type of municipal government. Cities may choose among aldermanic, mayoral, council-manager, and home-rule charter types of government. Cities may also petition to incorporate as towns.

== Municipalities ==
County seat
State capital and county seat

Notable incorporated cities in Oklahoma

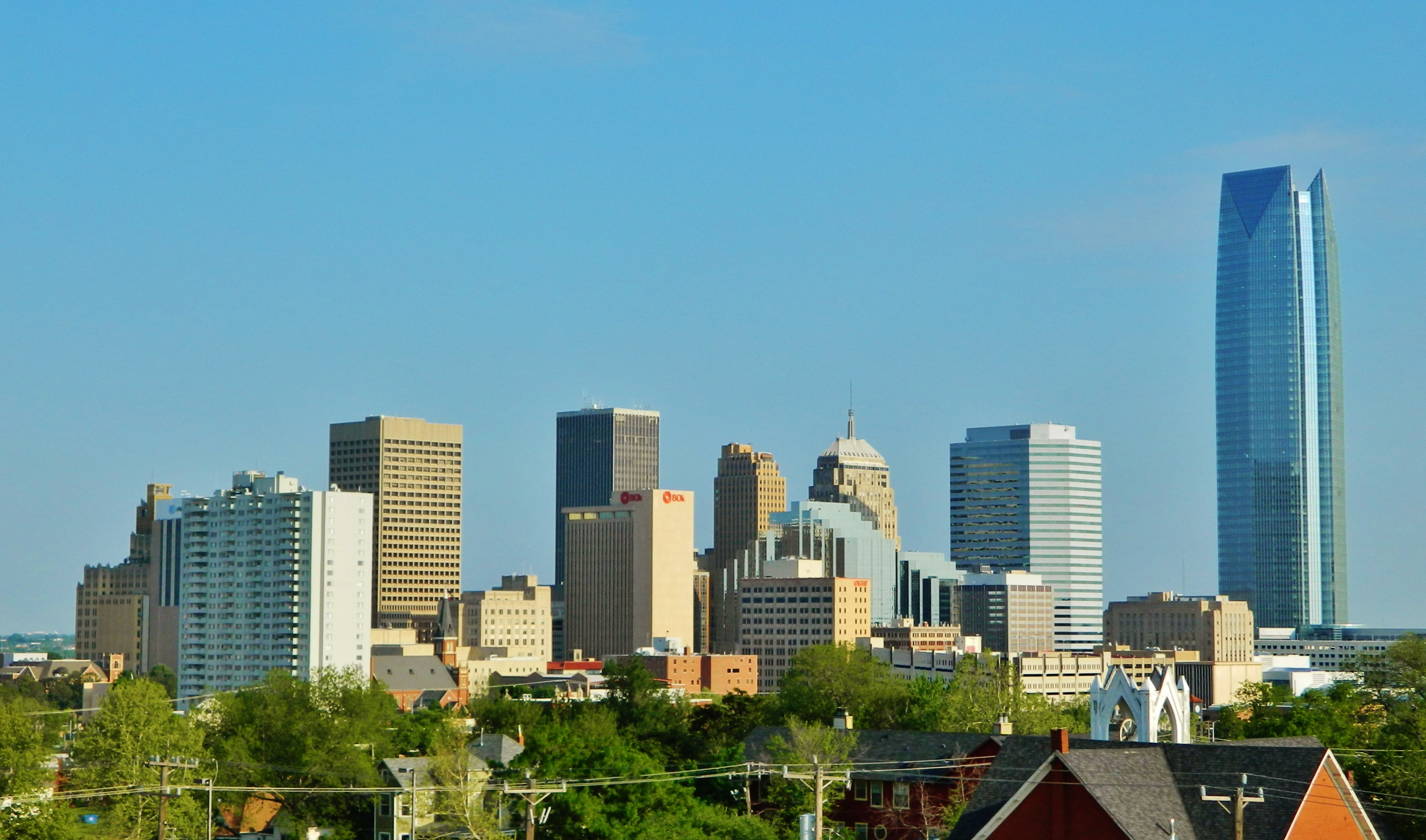
Oklahoma City, the capital of Oklahoma and the most populous city

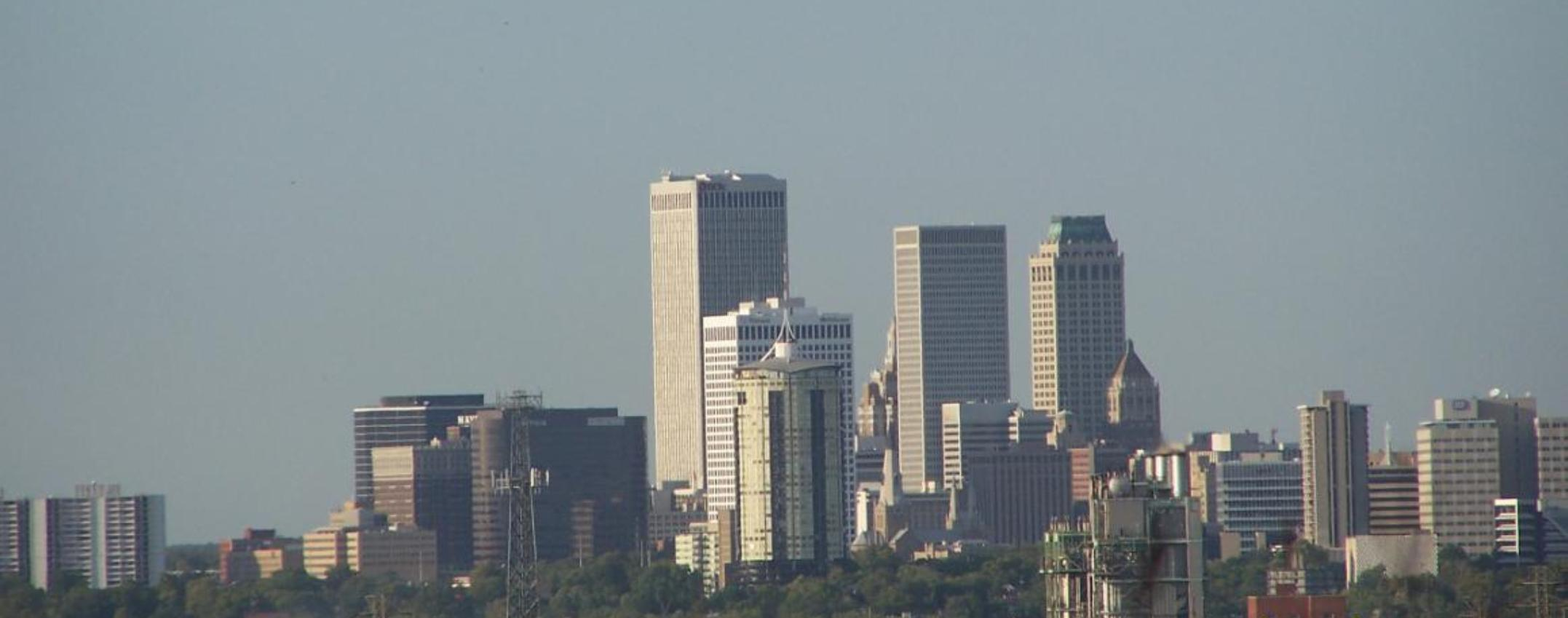
Tulsa, the second-most populous city

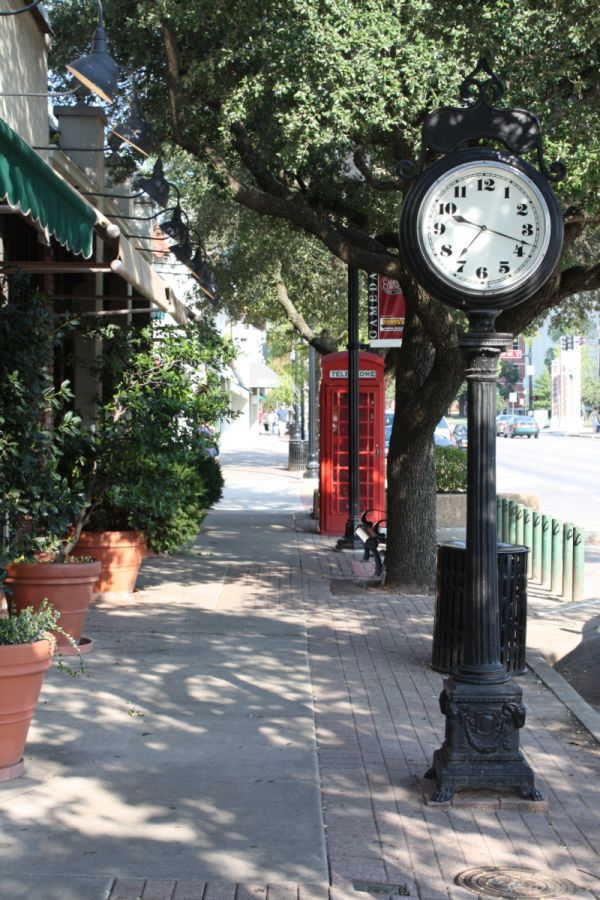
Norman, the third-most populous city

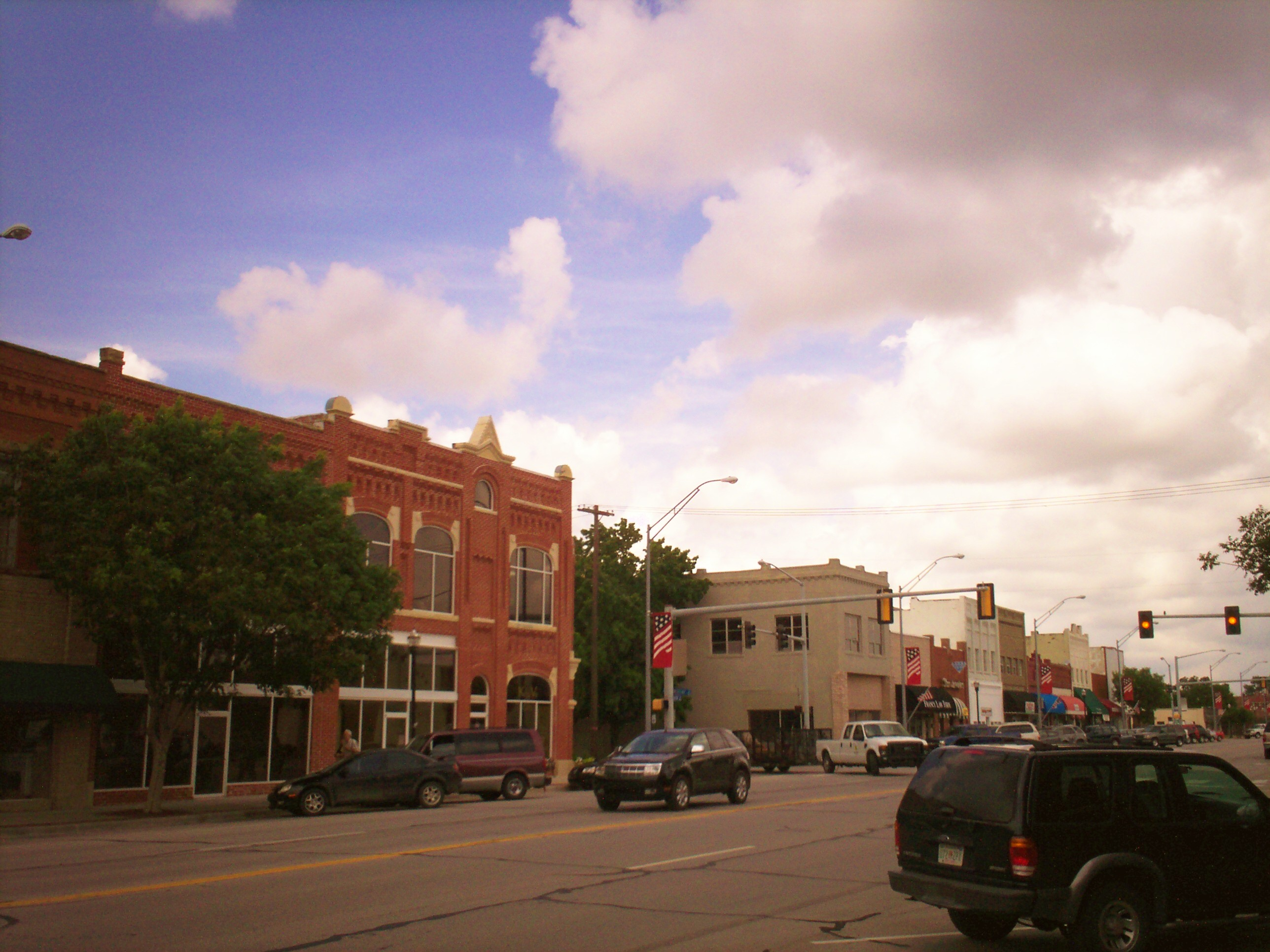
Broken Arrow, the fourth-most populous city

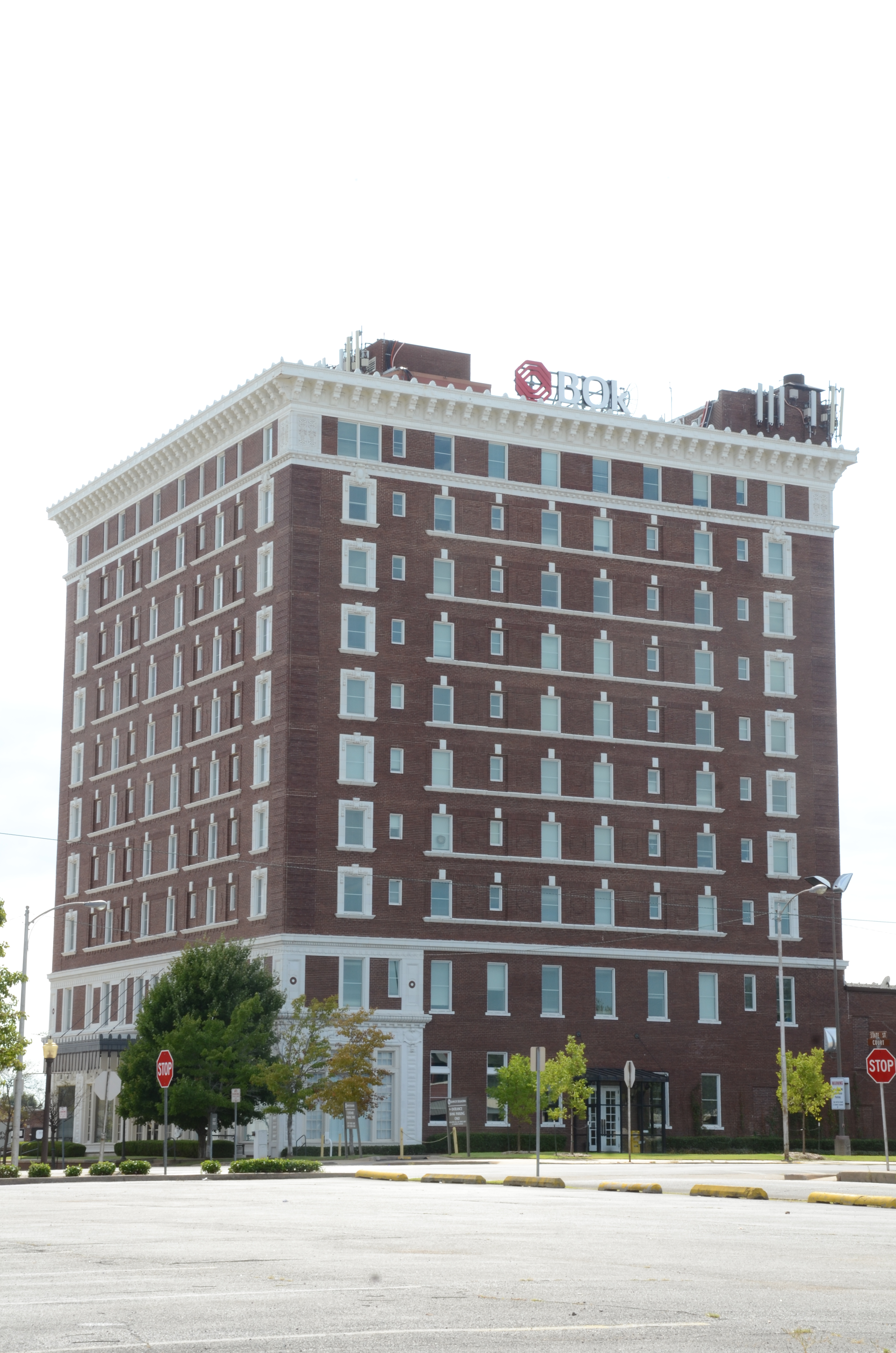
Severs Hotel Building, located in Downtown Muskogee

As of May 2025, the 597 Oklahoma municipalities include 164 cities and 433 towns.

2024 rank	Municipality	Designation	Primary county	Secondary county(ies)	Population		
2024 rank	Municipality	Designation	Primary county	Secondary county(ies)	2024 Estimate	2020 census	2020–2024 Change
1	Oklahoma City	City	Oklahoma	Canadian, Cleveland, Pottawatomie	712,919	681,054	+4.68%
2	Tulsa	City	Tulsa	Osage, Rogers, Wagoner	415,154	413,066	+0.51%
3	Norman	City	Cleveland		131,010	128,026	+2.33%
4	Broken Arrow	City	Tulsa	Wagoner	122,756	113,540	+8.12%
5	Edmond	City	Oklahoma		100,479	94,428	+6.41%
6	Lawton	City	Comanche		90,027	90,381	−0.39%
7	Moore	City	Cleveland		63,845	62,793	+1.68%
8	Midwest City	City	Oklahoma		58,505	58,409	+0.16%
9	Enid	City	Garfield		50,519	51,308	−1.54%
10	Stillwater	City	Payne		50,138	48,394	+3.60%
11	Owasso	City	Tulsa	Rogers	42,821	38,240	+11.98%
12	Bartlesville	City	Washington	Osage	38,355	37,290	+2.86%
13	Muskogee	City	Muskogee		36,849	36,878	−0.08%
14	Shawnee	City	Pottawatomie		32,092	31,377	+2.28%
15	Bixby	City	Tulsa	Wagoner	31,728	28,609	+10.90%
16	Jenks	City	Tulsa		27,869	25,949	+7.40%
17	Yukon	City	Canadian		27,068	23,630	+14.55%
18	Ardmore	City	Carter		25,064	24,725	+1.37%
19	Ponca City	City	Kay		24,234	24,424	−0.78%
20	Mustang	City	Canadian		23,965	19,879	+20.55%
21	Sapulpa	City	Creek	Tulsa	23,297	21,929	+6.24%
22	Duncan	City	Stephens		23,174	22,692	+2.12%
23	Del City	City	Oklahoma		21,272	21,822	−2.52%
24	Durant	City	Bryan		20,908	18,589	+12.48%
25	Claremore	City	Rogers		20,602	19,580	+5.22%
26	Bethany	City	Oklahoma		20,421	20,831	−1.97%
27	Sand Springs	City	Tulsa	Osage	20,330	19,874	+2.29%
28	El Reno	City	Canadian		20,041	16,989	+17.96%
29	Altus	City	Jackson		18,543	18,729	−0.99%
30	McAlester	City	Pittsburg		18,108	18,171	−0.35%
31	Tahlequah	City	Cherokee		17,319	16,209	+6.85%
32	Chickasha	City	Grady		17,014	16,051	+6.00%
33	Ada	City	Pontotoc		16,578	16,481	+0.59%
34	Newcastle	City	McClain		14,677	10,984	+33.62%
35	Glenpool	City	Tulsa		14,567	13,691	+6.40%
36	Miami	City	Ottawa		12,886	12,969	−0.64%
37	Guymon	City	Texas		12,397	12,965	−4.38%
38	Choctaw	City	Oklahoma		12,358	12,182	+1.44%
39	Weatherford	City	Custer		12,047	12,076	−0.24%
40	Woodward	City	Woodward		11,750	12,133	−3.16%
41	Guthrie	City	Logan		11,682	10,749	+8.68%
42	Elk City	City	Beckham		11,383	11,561	−1.54%
43	Okmulgee	City	Okmulgee		11,354	11,322	+0.28%
44	Coweta	City	Wagoner		11,093	9,654	+14.91%
45	Warr Acres	City	Oklahoma		10,456	10,452	+0.04%
46	Blanchard	City	McClain	Grady	9,869	8,879	+11.15%
47	Collinsville	City	Tulsa	Rogers	9,757	7,881	+23.80%
48	Pryor Creek	City	Mayes		9,700	9,444	+2.71%
49	The Village	City	Oklahoma		9,337	9,538	−2.11%
50	Poteau	City	LeFlore		9,111	8,807	+3.45%
51	Piedmont	City	Canadian	Kingfisher	9,092	7,402	+22.83%
52	Skiatook	City	Tulsa	Osage	8,879	8,450	+5.08%
53	Sallisaw	City	Sequoyah		8,708	8,510	+2.33%
54	Tuttle	City	Grady		8,584	7,413	+15.80%
55	Cushing	City	Payne		8,444	8,327	+1.41%
56	Wagoner	City	Wagoner		8,387	7,621	+10.05%
57	Clinton	City	Custer	Washita	8,355	8,521	−1.95%
58	Noble	City	Cleveland		7,779	6,985	+11.37%
59	Catoosa	City	Rogers	Wagoner	7,497	7,440	+0.77%
60	Grove	City	Delaware		7,327	6,956	+5.33%
61	Seminole	City	Seminole		7,264	7,146	+1.65%
62	Idabel	City	McCurtain		6,983	6,961	+0.32%
63	Purcell	City	McClain	Cleveland	6,938	6,651	+4.32%
64	Harrah	City	Oklahoma		6,853	6,245	+9.74%
65	Tecumseh	City	Pottawatomie		6,370	6,302	+1.08%
66	Pauls Valley	City	Garvin		6,112	5,992	+2.00%
67	Blackwell	City	Kay		6,016	6,085	−1.13%
68	Holdenville	City	Hughes		5,893	5,934	−0.69%
69	Verdigris	Town	Rogers		5,775	5,256	+9.87%
70	Henryetta	City	Okmulgee		5,606	5,640	−0.60%
71	Anadarko	City	Caddo		5,530	5,745	−3.74%
72	Vinita	City	Craig		5,395	5,193	+3.89%
73	Lone Grove	City	Carter		5,276	4,993	+5.67%
74	Kingfisher	City	Kingfisher		5,192	4,903	+5.89%
75	Hugo	City	Choctaw		5,142	5,166	−0.46%
76	Alva	City	Woods		4,962	5,028	−1.31%
77	Hinton	Town	Caddo		4,931	4,917	+0.28%
78	Sulphur	City	Murray		4,844	5,065	−4.36%
79	Sayre	City	Beckham		4,841	4,809	+0.67%
80	Pocola	Town	LeFlore		4,588	4,255	+7.83%
81	McLoud	City	Pottawatomie		4,519	4,351	+3.86%
82	Marlow	City	Stephens		4,505	4,385	+2.74%
83	Perry	City	Noble		4,448	4,484	−0.80%
84	Slaughterville	Town	Cleveland		4,324	4,163	+3.87%
85	Bristow	City	Creek		4,282	4,248	+0.80%
86	Broken Bow	City	McCurtain		4,227	4,228	−0.02%
87	Madill	City	Marshall		4,084	3,914	+4.34%
88	Roland	Town	Sequoyah		4,021	3,316	+21.26%
89	Spencer	City	Oklahoma		3,883	3,978	−2.39%
90	Stilwell	City	Adair		3,855	3,700	+4.19%
91	Nichols Hills	City	Oklahoma		3,851	3,870	−0.49%
92	Fort Gibson	Town	Muskogee	Cherokee	3,814	3,814	0.00%
93	Elgin	City	Comanche		3,613	3,656	−1.18%
94	Nowata	City	Nowata		3,592	3,517	+2.13%
95	Goldsby	Town	McClain		3,516	2,694	+30.51%
96	Dewey	City	Washington		3,439	3,372	+1.99%
97	Mannford	Town	Creek	Pawnee, Tulsa	3,429	3,262	+5.12%
98	Muldrow	Town	Sequoyah		3,358	3,272	+2.63%
99	Frederick	City	Tillman		3,356	3,468	−3.23%
100	Hobart	City	Kiowa		3,300	3,413	−3.31%
101	Perkins	City	Payne		3,292	3,205	+2.71%
102	Hominy	City	Osage		3,286	3,329	−1.29%
103	Bethel Acres	Town	Pottawatomie		3,270	3,029	+7.96%
104	Cleveland	City	Pawnee		3,263	3,205	+1.81%
105	Jones	Town	Oklahoma		3,213	2,885	+11.37%
106	Cache	City	Comanche		3,179	2,930	+8.50%
107	Calera	Town	Bryan		3,101	2,906	+6.71%
108	Checotah	City	McIntosh		3,086	3,018	+2.25%
109	Tishomingo	City	Johnston		3,083	3,101	−0.58%
110	Okemah	City	Okfuskee		3,066	3,074	−0.26%
111	Heavener	City	LeFlore		3,057	2,985	+2.41%
112	Wewoka	City	Seminole		3,047	3,133	−2.74%
113	Tonkawa	City	Kay		2,988	3,015	−0.90%
114	Chandler	City	Lincoln		2,944	2,828	+4.10%
115	Atoka	City	Atoka		2,925	3,195	−8.45%
116	Pawhuska	City	Osage		2,923	2,984	−2.04%
117	Lindsay	City	Garvin		2,910	2,864	+1.61%
118	Marietta	City	Love		2,891	2,719	+6.33%
119	Eufaula	City	McIntosh		2,872	2,766	+3.83%
120	Stroud	City	Lincoln	Creek	2,862	2,719	+5.26%
121	Davis	City	Murray	Garvin	2,831	2,823	+0.28%
122	Stigler	City	Haskell		2,784	2,703	+3.00%
123	New Cordell	City	Washita		2,744	2,775	−1.12%
124	Mangum	City	Greer		2,719	2,762	−1.56%
125	Fairview	City	Major		2,653	2,740	−3.18%
126	Watonga	City	Blaine		2,617	2,690	−2.71%
127	Drumright	City	Creek	Payne	2,527	2,560	−1.29%
128	Jay	City	Delaware		2,474	2,425	+2.02%
129	Prague	City	Lincoln	Pottawatomie	2,414	2,356	+2.46%
130	Walters	City	Cotton		2,384	2,412	−1.16%
131	Healdton	City	Carter		2,376	2,328	+2.06%
132	Nicoma Park	City	Oklahoma		2,294	2,313	−0.82%
133	Wilburton	City	Latimer		2,280	2,285	−0.22%
134	Kiefer	Town	Creek		2,271	2,187	+3.84%
135	Commerce	City	Ottawa		2,268	2,271	−0.13%
136	Newkirk	City	Kay		2,243	2,172	+3.27%
137	Hennessey	Town	Kingfisher		2,223	2,151	+3.35%
138	Spiro	Town	LeFlore		2,197	2,102	+4.52%
139	Antlers	City	Pushmataha		2,185	2,221	−1.62%
140	Pink	Town	Pottawatomie		2,179	2,091	+4.21%
141	Chouteau	Town	Mayes		2,154	2,059	+4.61%
142	Union City	Town	Canadian		2,075	1,794	+15.66%
143	Krebs	City	Pittsburg		2,068	2,083	−0.72%
144	Lexington	City	Cleveland		2,055	2,010	+2.24%
145	Chelsea	Town	Rogers		1,986	1,991	−0.25%
146	Pawnee	City	Pawnee		1,971	1,936	+1.81%
147	Wynnewood	City	Garvin		1,944	1,927	+0.88%
148	Burns Flat	Town	Washita		1,916	1,948	−1.64%
149	Inola	Town	Rogers		1,895	1,890	+0.26%
150	Hartshorne	City	Pittsburg		1,886	1,947	−3.13%
151	Arkoma	Town	LeFlore		1,858	1,806	+2.88%
152	Waurika	City	Jefferson		1,842	1,837	+0.27%
153	Hooker	City	Texas		1,732	1,802	−3.88%
154	Haskell	Town	Muskogee		1,721	1,626	+5.84%
155	Coalgate	City	Coal		1,715	1,667	+2.88%
156	Langston	Town	Logan		1,715	1,619	+5.93%
157	Luther	Town	Oklahoma		1,671	1,492	+12.00%
158	Hollis	City	Harmon		1,665	1,795	−7.24%
159	Granite	Town	Greer		1,622	1,628	−0.37%
160	Warner	Town	Muskogee		1,609	1,593	+1.00%
161	Minco	City	Grady		1,548	1,500	+3.20%
162	Helena	Town	Alfalfa		1,533	1,537	−0.26%
163	Kingston	Town	Marshall		1,477	1,431	+3.21%
164	Cherokee	City	Alfalfa		1,453	1,476	−1.56%
165	Wilson	City	Carter		1,445	1,399	+3.29%
166	Stratford	Town	Garvin		1,427	1,405	+1.57%
167	Westville	Town	Adair		1,420	1,364	+4.11%
168	Byng	Town	Pontotoc		1,403	1,393	+0.72%
169	Locust Grove	Town	Mayes		1,399	1,371	+2.04%
170	Comanche	City	Stephens		1,397	1,378	+1.38%
171	Crescent	City	Logan		1,386	1,299	+6.70%
172	Vian	Town	Sequoyah		1,386	1,374	+0.87%
173	Carnegie	Town	Caddo		1,379	1,430	−3.57%
174	Dickson	Town	Carter		1,372	1,331	+3.08%
175	Oologah	Town	Rogers		1,350	1,305	+3.45%
176	Morris	City	Okmulgee		1,334	1,299	+2.69%
177	Waukomis	Town	Garfield		1,325	1,349	−1.78%
178	Panama	Town	LeFlore		1,299	1,269	+2.36%
179	Beaver	Town	Beaver		1,252	1,280	−2.19%
180	Fletcher	Town	Comanche		1,251	1,204	+3.90%
181	Konawa	City	Seminole		1,246	1,288	−3.26%
182	Sperry	Town	Tulsa	Osage	1,244	1,115	+11.57%
183	Central High	Town	Stephens		1,232	1,181	+4.32%
184	Snyder	City	Kiowa		1,229	1,301	−5.53%
185	Laverne	Town	Harper		1,198	1,223	−2.04%
186	Okarche	Town	Canadian	Kingfisher	1,193	1,141	+4.56%
187	Shattuck	Town	Ellis		1,191	1,249	−4.64%
188	Beggs	City	Okmulgee		1,184	1,179	+0.42%
189	Geronimo	Town	Comanche		1,160	1,158	+0.17%
190	Thomas	City	Custer		1,138	1,143	−0.44%
191	Mooreland	Town	Woodward		1,135	1,178	−3.65%
192	Wetumka	City	Hughes		1,127	1,135	−0.70%
193	Fairland	Town	Ottawa		1,109	1,106	+0.27%
194	Salina	Town	Mayes		1,106	1,085	+1.94%
195	Colbert	Town	Bryan		1,105	1,027	+7.59%
196	Fairfax	Town	Osage		1,102	1,136	−2.99%
197	Maysville	Town	McClain	Garvin	1,087	1,087	0.00%
198	Boley	Town	Okfuskee		1,085	1,091	−0.55%
199	Boise City	City	Cimarron		1,077	1,166	−7.63%
200	Caddo	Town	Bryan		1,075	1,017	+5.70%
201	Yale	City	Payne		1,075	1,059	+1.51%
202	West Siloam Springs	Town	Delaware		1,068	1,000	+6.80%
203	Wister	Town	LeFlore		1,061	1,031	+2.91%
204	Okeene	Town	Blaine		1,052	1,090	−3.49%
205	Kellyville	Town	Creek		1,049	1,019	+2.94%
206	Forest Park	Town	Oklahoma		1,043	1,049	−0.57%
207	Meeker	Town	Lincoln		1,029	1,004	+2.49%
208	Rush Springs	Town	Grady		1,024	997	+2.71%
209	Buffalo	Town	Harper		1,019	1,039	−1.92%
210	Apache	Town	Caddo		1,008	1,034	−2.51%
211	North Enid	Town	Garfield		1,002	1,003	−0.10%
212	Shady Point	Town	LeFlore		1,000	972	+2.88%
213	Gore	Town	Sequoyah		999	951	+5.05%
214	Bray	Town	Stephens		997	952	+4.73%
215	Geary	City	Canadian	Blaine	987	994	−0.70%
216	Dibble	Town	McClain		985	867	+13.61%
217	Mounds	Town	Creek	Okmulgee	984	932	+5.58%
218	Erick	City	Beckham		982	1,000	−1.80%
219	Barnsdall	City	Osage		975	1,034	−5.71%
220	Cashion	Town	Kingfisher	Logan	948	850	+11.53%
221	Talihina	Town	LeFlore		932	925	+0.76%
222	Goodwell	Town	Texas		927	951	−2.52%
223	Oakland	Town	Marshall		916	831	+10.23%
224	Medford	City	Grant		915	932	−1.82%
225	Hydro	Town	Caddo	Blaine	907	927	−2.16%
226	Pond Creek	City	Grant		893	885	+0.90%
227	Oilton	City	Creek		891	885	+0.68%
228	Grandfield	City	Tillman		883	919	−3.92%
229	Ringling	Town	Jefferson		875	869	+0.69%
230	Maud	City	Pottawatomie	Seminole	868	867	+0.12%
231	Davenport	Town	Lincoln		852	809	+5.32%
232	Quinton	Town	Pittsburg		848	863	−1.74%
233	Temple	Town	Cotton		847	862	−1.74%
234	Texhoma	Town	Texas		835	856	−2.45%
235	Tipton	Town	Tillman		832	864	−3.70%
236	Quapaw	Town	Ottawa		829	811	+2.22%
237	Ninnekah	Town	Grady		820	775	+5.81%
238	Seiling	City	Dewey	Major	809	850	−4.82%
239	Weleetka	Town	Okfuskee		806	806	0.00%
240	Valliant	Town	McCurtain		805	819	−1.71%
241	Cyril	Town	Caddo		804	827	−2.78%
242	Allen	Town	Pontotoc	Hughes	803	805	−0.25%
243	Washington	Town	McClain		767	673	+13.97%
244	Dewar	Town	Okmulgee		760	763	−0.39%
245	Sentinel	Town	Washita		755	763	−1.05%
246	Colcord	Town	Delaware		753	728	+3.43%
247	Kansas	Town	Delaware		753	711	+5.91%
248	Afton	Town	Ottawa		752	734	+2.45%
249	Elmore City	Town	Garvin		751	738	+1.76%
250	Rock Island	Town	LeFlore		751	717	+4.74%
251	Adair	Town	Mayes		743	732	+1.50%
252	Cheyenne	Town	Roger Mills		736	771	−4.54%
253	Empire City	Town	Stephens		736	703	+4.69%
254	Mannsville	Town	Johnston		736	728	+1.10%
255	Tyrone	Town	Texas		735	729	+0.82%
256	Garber	City	Garfield		734	725	+1.24%
257	Copan	Town	Washington		729	710	+2.68%
258	Mountain View	Town	Kiowa		721	740	−2.57%
259	Morrison	Town	Noble		719	723	−0.55%
260	Wellston	Town	Lincoln		711	679	+4.71%
261	Blair	Town	Jackson		710	727	−2.34%
262	Springer	Town	Carter		707	685	+3.21%
263	Waynoka	Town	Woods		703	708	−0.71%
264	Haileyville	City	Pittsburg		698	716	−2.51%
265	South Coffeyville	Town	Nowata		694	683	+1.61%
266	Wayne	Town	McClain		670	625	+7.20%
267	Ryan	Town	Jefferson		668	667	+0.15%
268	Sterling	Town	Comanche		668	668	0.00%
269	Arapaho	Town	Custer		662	668	−0.90%
270	Cole	Town	McClain		652	624	+4.49%
271	Valley Brook	Town	Oklahoma		644	665	−3.16%
272	Porter	Town	Wagoner		640	561	+14.08%
273	Howe	Town	LeFlore		639	625	+2.24%
274	Welch	Town	Craig		638	622	+2.57%
275	Langley	Town	Mayes	Craig	637	606	+5.12%
276	Roff	Town	Pontotoc		629	632	−0.47%
277	Savanna	Town	Pittsburg		615	623	−1.28%
278	Bokchito	Town	Bryan		612	574	+6.62%
279	Earlsboro	Town	Pottawatomie		611	594	+2.86%
280	Porum	Town	Muskogee		611	602	+1.50%
281	Kiowa	Town	Pittsburg		607	595	+2.02%
282	Wright City	Town	McCurtain		602	616	−2.27%
283	Paoli	Town	Garvin		591	583	+1.37%
284	Corn	Town	Washita		589	592	−0.51%
285	Okay	Town	Wagoner		585	505	+15.84%
286	Vici	Town	Dewey		583	611	−4.58%
287	Boswell	Town	Choctaw		578	579	−0.17%
288	Velma	Town	Stephens		574	554	+3.61%
289	Billings	Town	Noble		573	578	−0.87%
290	Carney	Town	Lincoln		572	545	+4.95%
291	Clayton	Town	Pushmataha		555	555	0.00%
292	Winchester	Town	Okmulgee		554	546	+1.47%
293	Ramona	Town	Washington		548	524	+4.58%
294	Red Oak	Town	Latimer		529	537	−1.49%
295	Lahoma	Town	Garfield		526	539	−2.41%
296	Glencoe	Town	Payne		516	499	+3.41%
297	Ketchum	Town	Craig	Mayes	516	471	+9.55%
298	Verden	Town	Grady		515	508	+1.38%
299	Alex	Town	Grady		508	482	+5.39%
300	Calumet	Town	Canadian		506	443	+14.22%
301	Fort Cobb	Town	Caddo		505	518	−2.51%
302	Wyandotte	Town	Ottawa		495	488	+1.43%
303	Fort Towson	Town	Choctaw		494	492	+0.41%
304	Hulbert	Town	Cherokee		493	483	+2.07%
305	Canute	Town	Washita		489	494	−1.01%
306	Arnett	Town	Ellis		486	495	−1.82%
307	Medicine Park	Town	Comanche		474	411	+15.33%
308	Covington	Town	Garfield		469	472	−0.64%
309	Johnson	Town	Pottawatomie		469	457	+2.63%
310	Ravia	Town	Johnston		467	464	+0.65%
311	Hammon	Town	Roger Mills	Custer	463	479	−3.34%
312	Drummond	Town	Garfield		462	455	+1.54%
313	Olustee	Town	Jackson		459	468	−1.92%
314	Westport	Town	Pawnee		459	448	+2.46%
315	Amber	Town	Grady		455	413	+10.17%
316	Canton	Town	Blaine		455	468	−2.78%
317	Forgan	Town	Beaver		450	450	0.00%
318	Keota	Town	Haskell		447	437	+2.29%
319	Foyil	Town	Rogers		443	368	+20.38%
320	Ochelata	Town	Washington		443	427	+3.75%
321	Binger	Town	Caddo		441	438	+0.68%
322	Cedar Valley	City	Logan		437	405	+7.90%
323	Bernice	Town	Delaware		433	422	+2.61%
324	Schulter	Town	Okmulgee		433	422	+2.61%
325	Stringtown	Town	Atoka		433	419	+3.34%
326	Achille	Town	Bryan		429	398	+7.79%
327	Tushka	Town	Atoka		427	413	+3.39%
328	Paden	Town	Okfuskee		423	419	+0.95%
329	Cement	Town	Caddo		422	436	−3.21%
330	Stonewall	Town	Pontotoc		417	414	+0.72%
331	Depew	Town	Creek		415	411	+0.97%
332	Dill City	Town	Washita		415	420	−1.19%
333	Gage	Town	Ellis		415	433	−4.16%
334	Dover	Town	Kingfisher		411	400	+2.75%
335	Thackerville	Town	Love		411	400	+2.75%
336	Chattanooga	Town	Comanche	Tillman	408	400	+2.00%
337	Bokoshe	Town	LeFlore		406	396	+2.53%
338	Silo	Town	Bryan		402	384	+4.69%
339	East Duke	Town	Jackson		397	394	+0.76%
340	Ringwood	Town	Major		397	401	−1.00%
341	Prue	Town	Osage		396	374	+5.88%
342	Tryon	Town	Lincoln		395	378	+4.50%
343	Leedey	Town	Dewey		393	415	−5.30%
344	Wapanucka	Town	Johnston		390	386	+1.04%
345	Wynona	Town	Osage		383	370	+3.51%
346	Whitefield	Town	Haskell		380	371	+2.43%
347	Asher	Town	Pottawatomie		376	370	+1.62%
348	Custer City	Town	Custer		369	367	+0.54%
349	McCurtain	Town	Haskell		360	355	+1.41%
350	Carmen	Town	Alfalfa		359	360	−0.28%
351	Lone Wolf	Town	Kiowa		359	373	−3.75%
352	Spavinaw	Town	Mayes		357	350	+2.00%
353	Ripley	Town	Payne		354	346	+2.31%
354	Bowlegs	Town	Seminole		349	357	−2.24%
355	Fort Coffee	Town	LeFlore		349	335	+4.18%
356	Bridge Creek	Town	Grady		347	336	+3.27%
357	Oktaha	Town	Muskogee		347	343	+1.17%
358	Katie	Town	Garvin		346	332	+4.22%
359	Tribbey	Town	Pottawatomie		346	337	+2.67%
360	Webbers Falls	Town	Muskogee		340	338	+0.59%
361	Coyle	Town	Logan		338	350	−3.43%
362	Sportsmen Acres	Town	Mayes		338	317	+6.62%
363	Sawyer	Town	Choctaw		337	340	−0.88%
364	Vera	Town	Washington		336	334	+0.60%
365	Tupelo	City	Coal		332	327	+1.53%
366	Cameron	Town	LeFlore		331	323	+2.48%
367	Shidler	City	Osage		331	328	+0.91%
368	Dustin	Town	Hughes		330	327	+0.92%
369	Kaw City	City	Kay		327	325	+0.62%
370	Optima	Town	Texas		327	338	−3.25%
371	Agra	Town	Lincoln		326	311	+4.82%
372	Bennington	Town	Bryan		322	282	+14.18%
373	Fort Supply	Town	Woodward		319	317	+0.63%
374	Fanshawe	Town	LeFlore	Latimer	316	317	−0.32%
375	Eldorado	Town	Jackson		315	317	−0.63%
376	Mountain Park	Town	Kiowa		314	320	−1.88%
377	Wanette	Town	Pottawatomie		311	279	+11.47%
378	Calvin	Town	Hughes		309	309	0.00%
379	Wakita	Town	Grant		308	311	−0.96%
380	Avant	Town	Osage		302	301	+0.33%
381	Fargo	Town	Ellis		302	312	−3.21%
382	Crowder	Town	Pittsburg		297	306	−2.94%
383	Randlett	Town	Cotton		297	289	+2.77%
384	North Miami	Town	Ottawa		295	290	+1.72%
385	Jennings	Town	Pawnee		293	280	+4.64%
386	Lamont	Town	Grant		293	301	−2.66%
387	Mill Creek	Town	Johnston		291	293	−0.68%
388	Eakly	Town	Caddo		287	293	−2.05%
389	Kinta	Town	Haskell		285	285	0.00%
390	Haworth	Town	McCurtain		284	291	−2.41%
391	Lenapah	Town	Nowata		281	272	+3.31%
392	Lehigh	City	Coal		279	272	+2.57%
393	Rattan	Town	Pushmataha		279	276	+1.09%
394	Terral	Town	Jefferson		279	280	−0.36%
395	Cleo Springs	Town	Major		277	287	−3.48%
396	Gracemont	Town	Caddo		277	279	−0.72%
397	Watts	Town	Adair		277	227	+22.03%
398	Taloga	Town	Dewey		276	288	−4.17%
399	Delaware	Town	Nowata		274	267	+2.62%
400	Indiahoma	Town	Comanche		274	275	−0.36%
401	Ralston	Town	Pawnee		273	266	+2.63%
402	Braggs	Town	Muskogee		271	270	+0.37%
403	Oaks	Town	Delaware	Cherokee	268	267	+0.37%
404	Talala	Town	Rogers		266	258	+3.10%
405	Keyes	Town	Cimarron		254	276	−7.97%
406	Gans	Town	Sequoyah		252	251	+0.40%
407	Goltry	Town	Alfalfa		252	251	+0.40%
408	Francis	Town	Pontotoc		251	244	+2.87%
409	Milburn	Town	Johnston		250	252	−0.79%
410	Roosevelt	Town	Kiowa		250	254	−1.57%
411	Foster	Town	Garvin		249	246	+1.22%
412	Red Rock	Town	Noble		249	245	+1.63%
413	Kremlin	Town	Garfield		247	247	0.00%
414	Bluejacket	Town	Craig		243	235	+3.40%
415	Mead	Town	Bryan		239	227	+5.29%
416	Davidson	Town	Tillman		236	241	−2.07%
417	Cromwell	Town	Seminole		236	238	−0.84%
418	Mulhall	Town	Payne	Logan	235	212	+10.85%
419	Disney	Town	Mayes		227	222	+2.25%
420	Soper	Town	Choctaw		226	225	+0.44%
421	Marshall	Town	Logan		224	210	+6.67%
422	Alderson	Town	Pittsburg		217	220	−1.36%
423	Millerton	Town	McCurtain		213	215	−0.93%
424	Butler	Town	Custer		207	208	−0.48%
425	Byars	Town	McClain		204	184	+10.87%
426	Hardesty	Town	Texas		201	205	−1.95%
427	Breckenridge	Town	Garfield		200	199	+0.50%
428	Jet	Town	Alfalfa		197	197	0.00%
429	Meno	Town	Major		194	198	−2.02%
430	Caney	Town	Atoka		192	185	+3.78%
431	Pocasset	Town	Grady		192	183	+4.92%
432	Stuart	Town	Hughes		192	192	0.00%
433	Dougherty	Town	Murray		191	199	−4.02%
434	Ames	Town	Major		189	193	−2.07%
435	Fitzhugh	Town	Pontotoc		187	183	+2.19%
436	Nash	Town	Grant		187	192	−2.60%
437	Marble City	Town	Sequoyah		185	186	−0.54%
438	Bessie	Town	Washita		183	182	+0.55%
439	Camargo	Town	Dewey		183	193	−5.18%
440	Marland	Town	Noble		183	184	−0.54%
441	Longdale	Town	Blaine		182	186	−2.15%
442	Carter	Town	Beckham		180	183	−1.64%
443	Freedom	Town	Woods		179	174	+2.87%
444	Pittsburg	Town	Pittsburg		178	180	−1.11%
445	Garvin	Town	McCurtain		177	177	0.00%
446	Osage	Town	Osage		177	177	0.00%
447	Warwick	Town	Lincoln		177	164	+7.93%
448	Arcadia	Town	Oklahoma		176	169	+4.14%
449	Big Cabin	Town	Craig		176	174	+1.15%
450	Taft	Town	Muskogee		173	174	−0.57%
451	Aline	Town	Alfalfa		171	168	+1.79%
452	Castle	Town	Okfuskee		169	169	0.00%
453	Manitou	Town	Tillman		168	171	−1.75%
454	Boynton	Town	Muskogee		165	161	+2.48%
455	Cimarron City	Town	Logan		165	155	+6.45%
456	Etowah	Town	Cleveland		165	159	+3.77%
457	Braman	Town	Kay		164	160	+2.50%
458	Gotebo	Town	Kiowa		164	174	−5.75%
459	Kenefic	Town	Bryan		159	147	+8.16%
460	Martha	Town	Jackson		159	162	−1.85%
461	Gene Autry	Town	Carter		158	154	+2.60%
462	Liberty	Town	Tulsa	Okmulgee	157	153	+2.61%
463	LeFlore	Town	LeFlore		156	150	+4.00%
464	Tamaha	Town	Haskell		154	152	+1.32%
465	Woodlawn Park	Town	Oklahoma		154	160	−3.75%
466	Spaulding	Town	Hughes		149	149	0.00%
467	Slick	Town	Creek		148	151	−1.99%
468	Indianola	Town	Pittsburg		144	148	−2.70%
469	Canadian	Town	Pittsburg		143	143	0.00%
470	Hunter	Town	Garfield		141	145	−2.76%
471	Cowlington	Town	LeFlore		140	109	+28.44%
472	Orlando	Town	Logan	Payne	139	130	+6.92%
473	Bearden	Town	Okfuskee		136	135	+0.74%
474	Grayson	Town	Okmulgee		134	127	+5.51%
475	Kemp	Town	Bryan		133	126	+5.56%
476	Reydon	Town	Roger Mills		132	137	−3.65%
477	Fairmont	Town	Garfield		131	132	−0.76%
478	Peoria	Town	Ottawa		130	126	+3.17%
479	Sharon	Town	Woodward		130	133	−2.26%
480	Lawrence Creek	Town	Creek		129	121	+6.61%
481	Phillips	Town	Coal		128	122	+4.92%
482	Rocky	Town	Washita		127	128	−0.78%
483	St. Louis	Town	Pottawatomie		127	121	+4.96%
484	Carlton Landing	Town	Pittsburg		126	94	+34.04%
485	Burbank	Town	Osage		125	123	+1.63%
486	Norge	Town	Grady		125	129	−3.10%
487	Lamar	Town	Hughes		124	118	+5.08%
488	Sparks	Town	Lincoln		124	122	+1.64%
489	Armstrong	Town	Bryan		121	113	+7.08%
490	Bromide	Town	Johnston	Coal	121	123	−1.63%
491	Burlington	Town	Alfalfa		121	124	−2.42%
492	Tatums	Town	Carter		119	111	+7.21%
493	Willow	Town	Greer		116	119	−2.52%
494	Greenfield	Town	Blaine		115	114	+0.88%
495	Cornish	Town	Jefferson		113	110	+2.73%
496	Faxon	Town	Comanche		112	114	−1.75%
497	Hallett	Town	Pawnee		112	105	+6.67%
498	Summit	Town	Muskogee		112	108	+3.70%
499	Tullahassee	Town	Wagoner		112	83	+34.94%
500	Council Hill	Town	Muskogee		111	108	+2.78%
501	Dacoma	Town	Woods		110	109	+0.92%
502	Colony	Town	Washita		109	112	−2.68%
503	Lookeba	Town	Caddo		108	78	+38.46%
504	Hastings	Town	Jefferson		107	104	+2.88%
505	Pensacola	Town	Mayes		107	101	+5.94%
506	Rentiesville	Town	McIntosh		107	103	+3.88%
507	Loco	Town	Stephens		106	99	+7.07%
508	Hanna	Town	McIntosh		105	102	+2.94%
509	Smithville	Town	McCurtain		105	77	+36.36%
510	Foss	Town	Washita		103	101	+1.98%
511	Sweetwater	Town	Beckham	Roger Mills	102	102	0.00%
512	Redbird	Town	Wagoner		100	89	+12.36%
513	Bridgeport	City	Caddo		99	97	+2.06%
514	Hitchcock	Town	Blaine		98	102	−3.92%
515	Wann	Town	Nowata		97	95	+2.11%
516	Wainwright	Town	Muskogee		96	93	+3.23%
517	Gould	Town	Harmon		95	103	−7.77%
518	Kendrick	Town	Lincoln		95	87	+9.20%
519	Devol	Town	Cotton		93	93	0.00%
520	Gerty	Town	Hughes		93	92	+1.09%
521	Horntown	Town	Hughes		93	92	+1.09%
522	Addington	Town	Jefferson		92	83	+10.84%
523	Manchester	Town	Grant		90	90	0.00%
524	New Alluwe	Town	Nowata		88	89	−1.12%
525	Carrier	Town	Garfield		87	90	−3.33%
526	Lake Aluma	Town	Oklahoma		87	87	0.00%
527	Centrahoma	City	Coal		86	81	+6.17%
528	Kildare	Town	Kay		86	86	0.00%
529	Hoffman	Town	Okfuskee		85	81	+4.94%
530	Atwood	Town	Hughes		84	85	−1.18%
531	Bradley	Town	Grady		83	78	+6.41%
532	Terlton	Town	Pawnee		83	77	+7.79%
533	Hickory	Town	Murray		82	86	−4.65%
534	Grand Lake Towne	Town	Mayes		79	80	−1.25%
535	Leon	Town	Love		78	74	+5.41%
536	Lone Chimney	Town	Pawnee		78	0	NA
537	Sasakwa	Town	Seminole		78	80	−2.50%
538	Deer Creek	Town	Grant		75	78	−3.85%
539	Brooksville	Town	Pottawatomie		74	71	+4.23%
540	Fair Oaks	Town	Rogers	Wagoner	73	73	0.00%
541	Headrick	Town	Jackson		73	74	−1.35%
542	Hillsdale	Town	Garfield		73	75	−2.67%
543	Blackburn	Town	Pawnee		71	70	+1.43%
544	Loyal	Town	Kingfisher		71	71	0.00%
545	Oakwood	Town	Dewey		71	74	−4.05%
546	Paradise Hill	Town	Sequoyah		70	73	−4.11%
547	Maramec	Town	Pawnee		69	66	+4.55%
548	Rosedale	Town	McClain		68	62	+9.68%
549	Hendrix	Town	Bryan		67	61	+9.84%
550	Lima	Town	Seminole		67	68	−1.47%
551	Skedee	Town	Pawnee		67	62	+8.06%
552	Strang	Town	Mayes		67	64	+4.69%
553	Ratliff City	Town	Carter		65	64	+1.56%
554	Elmer	Town	Jackson		63	65	−3.08%
555	Erin Springs	Town	Garvin		63	89	−29.21%
556	Hitchita	Town	McIntosh		63	60	+5.00%
557	Albion	Town	Pushmataha		61	58	+5.17%
558	Mutual	Town	Woodward		61	63	−3.17%
559	Webb City	Town	Osage		61	58	+5.17%
560	IXL	Town	Okfuskee		60	59	+1.69%
561	Gate	Town	Beaver		57	60	−5.00%
562	Douglas	Town	Garfield		53	51	+3.92%
563	Smith Village	Town	Oklahoma		51	49	+4.08%
564	Yeager	Town	Hughes		50	45	+11.11%
565	Rosston	Town	Harper		49	52	−5.77%
566	Oak Grove	Town	Pawnee		48	22	+118.18%
567	Vernon	Town	McIntosh		46	43	+6.98%
568	New Woodville	Town	Marshall		43	60	−28.33%
569	Byron	Town	Alfalfa		41	37	+10.81%
570	Texola	Town	Beckham		41	43	−4.65%
571	Amorita	Town	Alfalfa		40	38	+5.26%
572	Hollister	Town	Tillman		34	35	−2.86%
573	Clearview	Town	Okfuskee		33	41	−19.51%
574	Grainola	Town	Osage		33	31	+6.45%
575	Moffett	Town	Sequoyah		32	38	−15.79%
576	Ashland	Town	Pittsburg		31	35	−11.43%
577	May	Town	Harper		30	29	+3.45%
578	Strong City	Town	Roger Mills		29	33	−12.12%
579	Putnam	Town	Dewey		27	30	−10.00%
580	Fallis	Town	Lincoln		24	21	+14.29%
581	Friendship	Town	Jackson		23	23	0.00%
582	Macomb	Town	Pottawatomie		22	22	0.00%
583	Sugden	Town	Jefferson		22	22	0.00%
584	Valley Park	Town	Rogers		22	19	+15.79%
585	Stidham	Town	McIntosh		19	17	+11.76%
586	Renfrow	Town	Grant		18	15	+20.00%
587	Foraker	Town	Osage		17	18	−5.56%
588	Meridian	Town	Logan		16	14	+14.29%
589	Loveland	Town	Tillman		14	13	+7.69%
590	Jefferson	Town	Grant		10	9	+11.11%
591	Lambert	Town	Alfalfa		6	5	+20.00%
592	Knowles	Town	Beaver		5	6	−16.67%
593	Cooperton	Town	Kiowa		4	3	+33.33%
594	Lotsee	Town	Tulsa		4	6	−33.33%
595	Capron	Town	Woods		0	27	−100.00%
596	Hoot Owl	Town	Mayes		0	0	NA
597	Mule Barn	Town	Pawnee		0	0	NA

== See also ==
- List of unincorporated communities in Oklahoma
- List of census-designated places in Oklahoma
- List of ghost towns in Oklahoma
- List of Oklahoma placenames of Native American origin
- List of city nicknames in Oklahoma
- Oklahoma statistical areas
