= National Register of Historic Places listings in Mayes County, Oklahoma =

Location of Mayes County in Oklahoma

This is a list of the National Register of Historic Places listings in Mayes County, Oklahoma.

This is intended to be a complete list of the properties and districts on the National Register of Historic Places in Mayes County, Oklahoma, United States. The locations of National Register properties and districts for which the latitude and longitude coordinates are included below, may be seen in a map.

There are 6 properties and districts listed on the National Register in the county.

This National Park Service list is complete through NPS recent listings posted July 31, 2026.

== Current listings ==
	Name on the Register	Image	Date listed	Location	City or town	Description
1	Cabin Creek Battlefield	Cabin Creek Battlefield	July 27, 1971 (#71000669)	3 miles north of Pensacola; 36°29′04″N 95°07′16″W	Pensacola	
2	Farmers and Merchants Bank	Farmers and Merchants Bank	July 14, 1983 (#83002091)	201 W. Main St. 36°10′41″N 95°20′45″W	Chouteau	
3	Lewis Ross/Cherokee Orphan Asylum Springhouse	Lewis Ross/Cherokee Orphan Asylum Springhouse	August 18, 1983 (#83002092)	Off State Highway 20; 36°17′30″N 95°08′59″W	Salina	
4	Pensacola Dam	Pensacola Dam	September 2, 2003 (#03000883)	State Highway 28 over the Grand River, 0.5 miles east of its junction with State Highway 82; 36°28′18″N 95°02′02″W	Langley	
5	Territorial Commercial District	Territorial Commercial District	September 22, 1983 (#83002093)	Main St. 36°11′12″N 95°20′41″W	Chouteau	The three 1903 buildings constituting the District were demolished; the tile work in front of the Gray-Adkins Merchantile has been preserved in front of the current location occupant, Utica Park Clinic.
6	Union Mission Site	Union Mission Site	September 10, 1971 (#71000668)	About 5 miles northeast of Mazie; 36°07′34″N 95°17′09″W	Mazie	

== See also ==
- List of National Historic Landmarks in Oklahoma
- National Register of Historic Places listings in Oklahoma
