= Sportmans Shores, Oklahoma =

- Census-designated place
- Location within Oklahoma Location within the United States
- Coordinates: 36°27′52″N 95°04′59″W
- Country: United States
- State: Oklahoma
- County: Mayes

Area
  - Total: 0.35 sq mi (0.90 km^{2})
  - Land: 0.29 sq mi (0.75 km^{2})
  - Water: 0.058 sq mi (0.15 km^{2})
- Elevation: 705 ft (215 m)

Population (2020)
  - Total: 239
  - Density: 830.5/sq mi (320.64/km^{2})
- Time zone: UTC-6 (Central (CST))
  - Summer (DST): UTC-5 (CDT)
- ZIP Code: 74301 (Vinita)
- Area codes: 918/539
- FIPS code: 40-69392
- GNIS feature ID: 2812859

Sportmans Shores is an unincorporated community and census-designated place (CDP) in Mayes County, Oklahoma, United States. It was first listed as a CDP for the 2020 census, with a population of 239.

== Geography ==
The CDP is in northeastern Mayes County, on the north shore of the Neosho River at the upstream end of Lake Hudson. It is 4 miles (6 km) by road west of Langley and 11 miles (18 km) east of Adair.

According to the U.S. Census Bureau, the Sportmans Shores CDP has an area of 0.34 square miles (0.88 km^{2}), of which 0.28 square miles (0.73 km^{2}) are land and 0.06 square miles (0.16 km^{2}), or 17.16%, are water.

== Demographics ==
Historical population
Census	Pop.	Note	%±
2020	239		—
U.S. Decennial Census

=== 2020 census ===
As of the 2020 census, Sportmans Shores had a population of 239. The median age was 54.8 years. 15.1% of residents were under the age of 18 and 26.8% of residents were 65 years of age or older. For every 100 females there were 121.3 males, and for every 100 females age 18 and over there were 118.3 males age 18 and over.

0.0% of residents lived in urban areas, while 100.0% lived in rural areas.

There were 113 households in Sportmans Shores, of which 20.4% had children under the age of 18 living in them. Of all households, 33.6% were married-couple households, 28.3% were households with a male householder and no spouse or partner present, and 29.2% were households with a female householder and no spouse or partner present. About 26.5% of all households were made up of individuals and 16.8% had someone living alone who was 65 years of age or older.

There were 138 housing units, of which 18.1% were vacant. The homeowner vacancy rate was 5.1% and the rental vacancy rate was 0.0%.

Racial composition as of the 2020 census
Race	Number	Percent
White	147	61.5%
Black or African American	0	0.0%
American Indian and Alaska Native	58	24.3%
Asian	0	0.0%
Native Hawaiian and Other Pacific Islander	0	0.0%
Some other race	1	0.4%
Two or more races	33	13.8%
Hispanic or Latino (of any race)	1	0.4%

== Education ==
It is in the Ketchum Public Schools school district.
