= Sams Corner, Oklahoma =

- Census-designated place
- Location within Oklahoma Location within the United States
- Coordinates: 36°11′54″N 95°13′00″W
- Country: United States
- State: Oklahoma
- County: Mayes

Area
  - Total: 0.96 sq mi (2.49 km^{2})
  - Land: 0.96 sq mi (2.49 km^{2})
  - Water: 0 sq mi (0.00 km^{2})
- Elevation: 620 ft (190 m)

Population (2020)
  - Total: 132
  - Density: 137.2/sq mi (52.97/km^{2})
- Time zone: UTC-6 (Central (CST))
  - Summer (DST): UTC-5 (CDT)
- ZIP Code: 74352 (Locust Grove)
- FIPS code: 40-65062
- GNIS feature ID: 2409246

Sams Corner is a census-designated place (CDP) in Mayes County, Oklahoma, United States. The population was 132 at the 2020 census.

== Geography ==
Sams Corner is in southern Mayes County, 3 miles (5 km) west of Locust Grove, which serves as the community's mailing address, and 8 miles (13 km) east of Chouteau. U.S. Route 412 Alternate forms the southern border of the community.

According to the U.S. Census Bureau, the Sams Corner CDP has a total area of 0.96 square miles (2.5 km^{2}), all land. The community is drained by Crutchfield Branch, which flows west one mile to the Neosho River in Fort Gibson Lake.

== Demographics ==
Historical population
| Census | Pop. | Note | %± |
|---|---|---|---|
| 2000 | 126 | | — |
| 2010 | 137 | | 8.7% |
| 2020 | 132 | | −3.6% |
U.S. Decennial Census

=== 2020 census ===
As of the 2020 census, Sams Corner had a population of 132. The median age was 51.0 years. 18.9% of residents were under the age of 18 and 23.5% of residents were 65 years of age or older. For every 100 females there were 67.1 males, and for every 100 females age 18 and over there were 72.6 males age 18 and over.

0.0% of residents lived in urban areas, while 100.0% lived in rural areas.

There were 50 households in Sams Corner, of which 20.0% had children under the age of 18 living in them. Of all households, 50.0% were married-couple households, 20.0% were households with a male householder and no spouse or partner present, and 30.0% were households with a female householder and no spouse or partner present. About 40.0% of all households were made up of individuals and 22.0% had someone living alone who was 65 years of age or older.

There were 56 housing units, of which 10.7% were vacant. The homeowner vacancy rate was 0.0% and the rental vacancy rate was 0.0%.

Racial composition as of the 2020 census
| Race | Number | Percent |
|---|---|---|
| White | 89 | 67.4% |
| Black or African American | 0 | 0.0% |
| American Indian and Alaska Native | 28 | 21.2% |
| Asian | 0 | 0.0% |
| Native Hawaiian and Other Pacific Islander | 0 | 0.0% |
| Some other race | 0 | 0.0% |
| Two or more races | 15 | 11.4% |
| Hispanic or Latino (of any race) | 3 | 2.3% |

=== 2000 census ===
As of the census of 2000, there were 126 people, 53 households, and 39 families residing in the CDP. The population density was 131.6 inhabitants per square mile (50.8/km^{2}). There were 56 housing units at an average density of 58.5 per square mile (22.6/km^{2}). The racial makeup of the CDP was 65.87% White, 30.16% Native American, and 3.97% from two or more races.

There were 53 households, out of which 39.6% had children under the age of 18 living with them, 58.5% were married couples living together, 9.4% had a female householder with no husband present, and 26.4% were non-families. 24.5% of all households were made up of individuals, and 11.3% had someone living alone who was 65 years of age or older. The average household size was 2.38 and the average family size was 2.85.

In the CDP, the population was spread out, with 25.4% under the age of 18, 6.3% from 18 to 24, 29.4% from 25 to 44, 23.8% from 45 to 64, and 15.1% who were 65 years of age or older. The median age was 40 years. For every 100 females, there were 103.2 males. For every 100 females age 18 and over, there were 100.0 males.

The median income for a household in the CDP was $35,000, and the median income for a family was $53,309. Males had a median income of $34,412 versus $20,368 for females. The per capita income for the CDP was $15,980. There were 20.5% of families and 18.9% of the population living below the poverty line, including 41.7% of under eighteens and none of those over 64.

== Education ==
It is in the Locust Grove Public Schools school district.
