= Pin Oak Acres, Oklahoma =

- Census-designated place
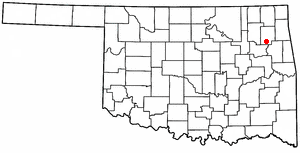
- Location in Oklahoma
- Coordinates: 36°07′24″N 95°17′27″W
- Country: United States
- State: Oklahoma
- County: Mayes

Area
  - Total: 5.61 sq mi (14.53 km^{2})
  - Land: 5.61 sq mi (14.53 km^{2})
  - Water: 0 sq mi (0.00 km^{2})
- Elevation: 663 ft (202 m)

Population (2020)
  - Total: 321
  - Density: 57/sq mi (22.1/km^{2})
- Time zone: UTC-6 (Central (CST))
  - Summer (DST): UTC-5 (CDT)
- ZIP Code: 74337 (Chouteau)
- FIPS code: 40-59175
- GNIS feature ID: 2409064

Pin Oak Acres is an unincorporated community and census-designated place (CDP) in Mayes County, Oklahoma, United States. The population was 321 at the 2020 census, down from 421 in 2010.

== Geography ==
Pin Oak Acres is in southern Mayes County, 7 miles (11 km) southeast of Chouteau and 4 miles (6 km) east of U.S. Route 69 on the west bank of the Neosho River, upstream of Fort Gibson Dam.

According to the U.S. Census Bureau, the CDP has a total area of 5.6 square miles (14.5 km^{2}), all land.

== Demographics ==
Historical population
Census	Pop.	Note	%±
2000	427		—
2010	421		−1.4%
2020	321		−23.8%
U.S. Decennial Census

=== 2020 census ===
As of the 2020 census, Pin Oak Acres had a population of 321. The median age was 50.2 years. 17.4% of residents were under the age of 18 and 19.0% of residents were 65 years of age or older. For every 100 females there were 121.4 males, and for every 100 females age 18 and over there were 105.4 males age 18 and over.

0.0% of residents lived in urban areas, while 100.0% lived in rural areas.

There were 132 households in Pin Oak Acres, of which 29.5% had children under the age of 18 living in them. Of all households, 68.2% were married-couple households, 15.2% were households with a male householder and no spouse or partner present, and 15.2% were households with a female householder and no spouse or partner present. About 11.4% of all households were made up of individuals and 5.3% had someone living alone who was 65 years of age or older.

There were 174 housing units, of which 24.1% were vacant. The homeowner vacancy rate was 0.8% and the rental vacancy rate was 36.4%.

Racial composition as of the 2020 census
Race	Number	Percent
White	247	76.9%
Black or African American	1	0.3%
American Indian and Alaska Native	23	7.2%
Asian	1	0.3%
Native Hawaiian and Other Pacific Islander	0	0.0%
Some other race	2	0.6%
Two or more races	47	14.6%
Hispanic or Latino (of any race)	11	3.4%

=== 2000 census ===
As of the census of 2000, there were 427 people, 140 households, and 117 families residing in the CDP. The population density was 74.3 inhabitants per square mile (28.7/km^{2}). There were 193 housing units at an average density of 33.6 per square mile (13.0/km^{2}). The racial makeup of the CDP was 77.99% White, 1.41% African American, 10.77% Native American, 0.70% Asian, 0.94% from other races, and 8.20% from two or more races. Hispanic or Latino of any race were 2.58% of the population.

There were 140 households, out of which 35.7% had children under the age of 18 living with them, 67.9% were married couples living together, 5.0% had a female householder with no husband present, and 16.4% were non-families. 12.9% of all households were made up of individuals, and 5.7% had someone living alone who was 65 years of age or older. The average household size was 3.05 and the average family size was 3.33.

In the CDP, the population was spread out, with 31.1% under the age of 18, 11.5% from 18 to 24, 25.8% from 25 to 44, 21.5% from 45 to 64, and 10.1% who were 65 years of age or older. The median age was 33 years. For every 100 females, there were 120.1 males. For every 100 females age 18 and over, there were 119.4 males.

The median income for a household in the CDP was $50,577, and the median income for a family was $50,865. Males had a median income of $32,500 versus $19,750 for females. The per capita income for the CDP was $15,361. About 9.4% of families and 14.7% of the population were below the poverty line, including 22.7% of those under age 18 and 44.4% of those age 65 or over.

== Education ==
It is in the Chouteau-Mazie Public Schools school district.
