= Mayes County, Oklahoma =

County in Oklahoma, United States

- County
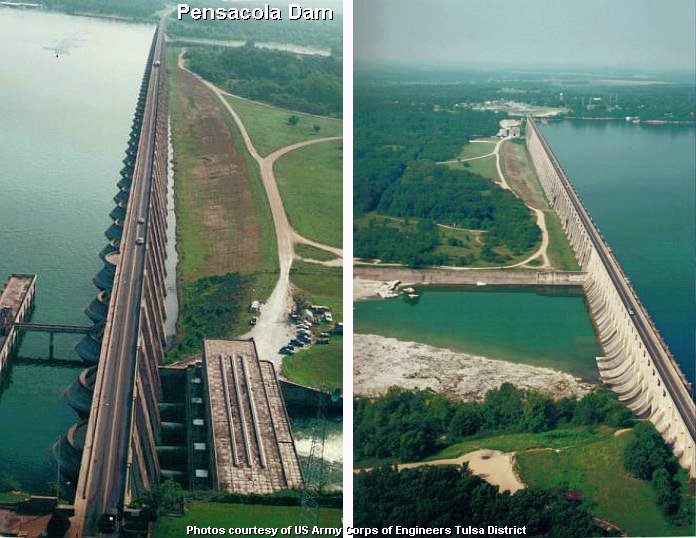
- Pensacola Dam on the Neosho River in-between Disney and Langley on Oklahoma State Highway 28, creating Grand Lake o' the Cherokees.

- Location within the U.S. state of Oklahoma
- Coordinates: 36°18′N 95°14′W
- Country: United States
- State: Oklahoma
- Founded: November 16, 1907
- Named for: Samuel Houston Mayes
- Seat: Pryor Creek
- Largest city: Pryor Creek

Area
  - Total: 684 sq mi (1,770 km^{2})
  - Land: 655 sq mi (1,700 km^{2})
  - Water: 28 sq mi (73 km^{2}) 4.1%

Population (2020)
  - Total: 39,046
  - Estimate (2025): 40,416 ▲
  - Density: 59.6/sq mi (23.0/km^{2})
- Time zone: UTC−6 (Central)
  - Summer (DST): UTC−5 (CDT)
- Congressional district: 2nd
- Website: mayes.okcounties.org

Mayes County is a county located in the U.S. state of Oklahoma. As of the 2020 census, the population was 39,046. Its county seat is Pryor Creek. Named for Samuel Houston Mayes, Principal Chief of the Cherokee Nation from 1895 to 1899, it was originally created at the Sequoyah Convention in August 1905.

== History ==
According to the Encyclopedia of Oklahoma History and Culture, the area covered by what is now Mayes County has many prehistoric sites. There is evidence of human habitation dated before 6,000 BC, plus 35 Archaic sites (6,000 BC to 1 AD), 25 Woodland sites (1 AD to 1,000 AD) and 31 Plains Village sites (1000 AD to 1500 AD).

French voyageurs roamed the area in the early 18th Century, giving French names to many of the waterways and other local sites. Jean Pierre Chouteau established a trading post at the location of the present town of Salina, where he chiefly traded with the Osage tribe that had settled in the vicinity. Union Mission, near the present day town of Chouteau, Oklahoma was established in 1820. Rev. Samuel Worcestor set up the first printing press in this part of the United States at Union Mission in 1835.

In 1828, members of the Western Cherokee Nation began arriving in the area from their former lands in Arkansas. The Eastern Cherokee, who were forced from their homes in Tennessee, Georgia and North Carolina, followed during the 1830s. In 1841, the present Mayes County area became part of the Saline District of the Cherokee Nation.

This area of Oklahoma experienced some military activity during the Civil War. A 300-man Union Army force surprised an equally large Confederate unit near the present site of Locust Grove, Oklahoma in July 1862. The Union force prevailed and captured about one third of the Confederates, while the remainder escaped. In July 1863, Confederate General Stand Watie tried to capture a Union supply train headed to Fort Gibson. Federal forces under Colonel James Williams successfully defended the train and drove off Watie's men. This action was thereafter known as the First Battle of Cabin Creek. In September 1864, General Watie and General Richard Gano did capture a Union supply train in the same location. This was named the Second Battle of Cabin Creek. Colonel James Williams led a detachment that recovered the wagon train in a skirmish near Pryor Creek. The Confederate force escaped.

After the Civil War, transportation improvements opened up the area's economy. The East Shawnee Trail, and early cattle trail followed the route of the Grand River. The Texas Road came through later. In 1871 to 1872, the Missouri-Kansas-Texas Railroad built its track through the present county. The Missouri, Oklahoma and Gulf Railway (later, the Kansas, Oklahoma and Gulf Railway) built a line in 1913 that joined the Katy system at Strang, Oklahoma.

== Geography ==
According to the U.S. Census Bureau, the county has a total area of 684 square miles (1,770 km^{2}), of which 655 square miles (1,700 km^{2}) is land and 28 square miles (73 km^{2}) (4.1%) is water.

The county is bisected by the Grand River. The eastern half of the county is on the Ozark Plateau, with flat areas divided by deep stream valleys. The western half is in the Prairie Plains.

The county contains several man-made major reservoirs, including:

- Lake Fort Gibson;
- Lake Spavinaw;
- Grand Lake o' the Cherokees;
- Lake Hudson;
- Salina Pumped Storage Project.

Lake Spavinaw is owned by the city of Tulsa and is the principal source of water for the city. The other three reservoirs were built by the Federal Government primarily for flood control and hydroelectric power generation. They are managed by the Grand River Dam Authority (GRDA). GRDA also manages the GRDA Coal-fired power generation station.

=== Major highways ===
- Interstate 44 / Will Rogers Turnpike
- U.S. Highway 69
- U.S. Highway 412
  - US 412 Alt.
- Cherokee Turnpike
- State Highway 20
- State Highway 28
- State Highway 69A
- State Highway 82
- State Highway 412B

=== Adjacent counties ===
- Craig County (north)
- Delaware County (east)
- Cherokee County (southeast)
- Wagoner County (south)
- Rogers County (west)

== Demographics ==
Historical population
Census	Pop.	Note	%±
1910	13,596		—
1920	16,829		23.8%
1930	17,883		6.3%
1940	21,668		21.2%
1950	19,743		−8.9%
1960	20,073		1.7%
1970	23,302		16.1%
1980	32,261		38.4%
1990	33,366		3.4%
2000	38,369		15.0%
2010	41,259		7.5%
2020	39,046		−5.4%
2025 (est.)	40,416	▲	3.5%
U.S. Decennial Census; 1790-1960 1900-1990; 1990-2000 2010

=== 2020 census ===
As of the 2020 census, the county had a population of 39,046. Of the residents, 24.0% were under the age of 18 and 19.8% were 65 years of age or older; the median age was 40.9 years. For every 100 females there were 100.0 males, and for every 100 females age 18 and over there were 96.9 males.

The racial makeup of the county was 61.3% White, 0.5% Black or African American, 21.1% American Indian and Alaska Native, 0.5% Asian, 1.1% from some other race, and 15.5% from two or more races. Hispanic or Latino residents of any race comprised 3.5% of the population.

There were 15,219 households in the county, of which 30.8% had children under the age of 18 living with them and 24.0% had a female householder with no spouse or partner present. About 25.6% of all households were made up of individuals and 12.9% had someone living alone who was 65 years of age or older.

There were 18,263 housing units, of which 16.7% were vacant. Among occupied housing units, 73.2% were owner-occupied and 26.8% were renter-occupied. The homeowner vacancy rate was 1.9% and the rental vacancy rate was 9.2%.

=== 2010 census ===
As of the 2010 census, Mayes County had a population of 41,259. The racial and ethnic makeup of the population was 68.0% white, 0.4% black, 21.4% Native American, 0.4% Asian, 0.8% reporting some other race and 9.0% of the population reporting two or more races; 2.7% of the population reported being Hispanic or Latino of any race.

=== 2000 census ===
As of the census of 2000, there were 38,369 people, 14,823 households, and 10,820 families residing in the county. The population density was 58 people per square mile (22 people/km^{2}). There were 17,423 housing units at an average density of 27 units per square mile (10/km^{2}). The racial makeup of the county was 72.14% White, 0.30% Black or African American, 19.10% Native American, 0.28% Asian, 0.01% Pacific Islander, 0.62% from other races, and 7.55% from two or more races. 1.87% of the population were Hispanic or Latino of any race. 94.8% spoke English, 2.1% Cherokee, 1.4% Spanish and 1.2% German as their first language.

There were 14,823 households, out of which 32.60% had children under the age of 18 living with them, 60.20% were married couples living together, 9.00% had a female householder with no husband present, and 27.00% were non-families. 23.80% of all households were made up of individuals, and 11.10% had someone living alone who was 65 years of age or older. The average household size was 2.55 and the average family size was 3.02.

In the county, the population was spread out, with 26.60% under the age of 18, 8.60% from 18 to 24, 26.20% from 25 to 44, 23.80% from 45 to 64, and 14.90% who were 65 years of age or older. The median age was 37 years. For every 100 females there were 98.40 males. For every 100 females age 18 and over, there were 95.40 males.

The median income for a household in the county was $31,125, and the median income for a family was $37,542. Males had a median income of $31,668 versus $20,573 for females. The per capita income for the county was $15,350. About 11.20% of families and 14.30% of the population were below the poverty line, including 18.90% of those under age 18 and 10.90% of those age 65 or over.

== Politics ==
Voter Registration and Party Enrollment as of June 30, 2023
Party	Number of Voters	Percentage
Democratic	6,234	26.28%
Republican	13,791	58.15%
Others	3,698	15.59%
Total	23,723	100%

United States presidential election results for Mayes County, Oklahoma
Year	Republican		Democratic		Third party(ies)	
Year	No.	%	No.	%	No.	%
1908	1,021	45.28%	1,186	52.59%	48	2.13%
1912	1,077	40.16%	1,391	51.86%	214	7.98%
1916	1,229	40.55%	1,574	51.93%	228	7.52%
1920	2,447	53.23%	1,987	43.22%	163	3.55%
1924	2,317	47.40%	2,246	45.95%	325	6.65%
1928	3,004	57.61%	2,161	41.45%	49	0.94%
1932	1,596	26.42%	4,444	73.58%	0	0.00%
1936	2,690	40.62%	3,920	59.19%	13	0.20%
1940	3,631	47.10%	4,057	52.63%	21	0.27%
1944	3,822	49.82%	3,830	49.93%	19	0.25%
1948	2,854	40.45%	4,201	59.55%	0	0.00%
1952	4,704	55.08%	3,837	44.92%	0	0.00%
1956	4,677	55.43%	3,760	44.57%	0	0.00%
1960	5,194	58.26%	3,721	41.74%	0	0.00%
1964	4,157	43.40%	5,421	56.60%	0	0.00%
1968	4,260	44.63%	2,855	29.91%	2,431	25.47%
1972	7,535	72.08%	2,656	25.41%	263	2.52%
1976	5,040	44.14%	6,298	55.15%	81	0.71%
1980	6,633	53.67%	5,344	43.24%	381	3.08%
1984	8,585	62.04%	5,154	37.25%	99	0.72%
1988	6,115	47.40%	6,691	51.86%	95	0.74%
1992	5,445	35.89%	6,432	42.40%	3,294	21.71%
1996	5,268	39.59%	6,377	47.92%	1,663	12.50%
2000	7,132	50.94%	6,618	47.27%	251	1.79%
2004	9,946	58.93%	6,933	41.07%	0	0.00%
2008	10,234	64.03%	5,749	35.97%	0	0.00%
2012	9,637	66.65%	4,823	33.35%	0	0.00%
2016	11,555	73.52%	3,423	21.78%	739	4.70%
2020	12,749	76.68%	3,581	21.54%	296	1.78%
2024	13,514	77.78%	3,529	20.31%	331	1.91%

== Economy ==
Agriculture has long been the primary economic activity in the county. Important crops include: corn, soybeans, sorghum and hay. Cattle raising and dairy farming occur in the more rugged parts of the Ozark Plateau.

Heavy industry came to the county in 1941 with the creation of the government-owned Oklahoma Ordnance Works, a munitions manufacturing plant near Pryor. The plant, which had been operated by duPont, closed after the end of World War II, and remained vacant for many years. In 1960, the former munitions plant was converted into the MidAmerica Industrial Park, which included plants manufacturing paper, cement and fertilizer.

The Grand River Dam Authority (GRDA) is a major employer. It operates several hydroelectric plants and two coal-fired electric power generators in the county.

There is a Google data center in the county.

== Communities ==
=== City ===
- Pryor Creek (county seat)

=== Towns ===
- Adair
- Chouteau
- Disney
- Grand Lake Towne
- Hoot Owl (Ghost Town)
- Ketchum
- Langley
- Locust Grove
- Pensacola
- Salina
- Spavinaw
- Sportsmen Acres
- Strang

=== Census-designated places ===
- Ballou
- Cedar Crest
- Iron Post
- Kenwood
- Little Rock
- Mazie
- Murphy
- Pin Oak Acres
- Pump Back
- Rose
- Sams Corner
- Snake Creek
- Sportmans Shores
- Wickliffe

=== Other unincorporated communities ===
- Boatman
- Sportsmen Acres Community

== Education ==
Unified school districts include:

- Adair Public Schools
- Chelsea Public Schools
- Chouteau-Mazie Public Schools
- Inola Public Schools
- Jay Public Schools
- Ketchum Public Schools
- Locust Grove Public Schools
- Pryor Public Schools
- Salina Public Schools
- Vinita Public Schools

There are two elementary school districts: Osage Public School and Wickliffe Public School.

The Big Cabin School District covered parts of the county until its 1992 dissolution. It merged into the Vinita school district.

== NRHP sites ==
The following sites in Mayes County are listed on the National Register of Historic Places:

- Cabin Creek Battlefield, Pensacola
- Farmers and Merchants Bank, Chouteau
- Lewis Ross/Cherokee Orphan Asylum Springhouse, Salina
- Pensacola Dam, Langley
- Territorial Commercial District, Chouteau
- Union Mission Site, Mazie
