= Hoot Owl =

Hoot Owl may refer to:

- Barred owl or great horned owl, types of owl
- Hoot Owl, Oklahoma, a town
- Hoot Owl, Master of Disguise, a picture book by Sean Taylor

== See also ==
- Hoot the Owl from Giggle and Hoot, Australian children's television program
- Hoots the Owl, Sesame Street Muppet character
