= Strang, Oklahoma =

- Town
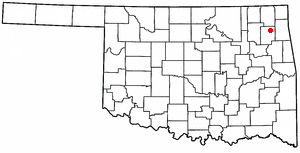
- Location in Oklahoma
- Coordinates: 36°24′44″N 95°08′05″W
- Country: United States
- State: Oklahoma
- County: Mayes
- Established: 1921

Area
  - Total: 0.28 sq mi (0.73 km^{2})
  - Land: 0.28 sq mi (0.73 km^{2})
  - Water: 0 sq mi (0.00 km^{2})
- Elevation: 643 ft (196 m)

Population (2020)
  - Total: 64
  - Density: 227.0/sq mi (87.65/km^{2})
- Time zone: UTC-6 (Central (CST))
  - Summer (DST): UTC-5 (CDT)
- ZIP Code: 74367
- Area codes: 539/918
- FIPS code: 40-70750
- GNIS feature ID: 2413339

Strang is a town in Mayes County, Oklahoma, United States. The population was 64 at the 2020 census, down from 89 in 2010.

== History ==
Strang was surveyed in 1913 by the Missouri, Oklahoma and Gulf Railway (later the Kansas, Oklahoma and Gulf Railway), who were building tracks towards Wagoner. A post office was also established in 1913, replacing the nearby Lynch post office, and the town was incorporated in 1921. It was named for Clarita Strang Kenefic, wife of railroad developer William Kenefic.

== Geography ==
Strang is in northeastern Mayes County, less than a mile northeast of Lake Hudson, a reservoir on the Neosho River. The town is 16 miles (26 km) by road northeast of Pryor Creek, the county seat, 7 miles (11 km) west-northwest of Spavinaw, and 8 miles (13 km) southwest of Langley.

According to the U.S. Census Bureau, the town of Strang has a total area of 0.3 square miles (0.78 km^{2}), all land.

== Demographics ==
Historical population
Census	Pop.	Note	%±
1930	286		—
1940	283		−1.0%
1950	201		−29.0%
1960	176		−12.4%
1970	164		−6.8%
1980	126		−23.2%
1990	141		11.9%
2000	465		229.8%
2010	89		−80.9%
2020	64		−28.1%
U.S. Decennial Census

=== 2020 census ===
As of the 2020 census, Strang had a population of 64. The median age was 41.5 years. 15.6% of residents were under the age of 18 and 25.0% of residents were 65 years of age or older. For every 100 females there were 113.3 males, and for every 100 females age 18 and over there were 116.0 males age 18 and over.

0.0% of residents lived in urban areas, while 100.0% lived in rural areas.

There were 28 households in Strang, of which 50.0% had children under the age of 18 living in them. Of all households, 46.4% were married-couple households, 25.0% were households with a male householder and no spouse or partner present, and 10.7% were households with a female householder and no spouse or partner present. About 17.9% of all households were made up of individuals and 7.1% had someone living alone who was 65 years of age or older.

There were 39 housing units, of which 28.2% were vacant. The homeowner vacancy rate was 0.0% and the rental vacancy rate was 50.0%.

Racial composition as of the 2020 census
Race	Number	Percent
White	40	62.5%
Black or African American	0	0.0%
American Indian and Alaska Native	17	26.6%
Asian	0	0.0%
Native Hawaiian and Other Pacific Islander	0	0.0%
Some other race	1	1.6%
Two or more races	6	9.4%
Hispanic or Latino (of any race)	0	0.0%

=== 2000 census ===
As of the census of 2000, there were 100 people, 43 households, and 27 families residing in the town. The population density was 352.2 inhabitants per square mile (136.0/km^{2}). There were 54 housing units at an average density of 190.2 per square mile (73.4/km^{2}). The racial makeup of the town was 66.00% White, 21.00% Native American, and 13.00% from two or more races. Hispanic or Latino of any race were 4.00% of the population.

There were 43 households, out of which 20.9% had children under the age of 18 living with them, 51.2% were married couples living together, 7.0% had a female householder with no husband present, and 37.2% were non-families. 37.2% of all households were made up of individuals, and 23.3% had someone living alone who was 65 years of age or older. The average household size was 2.33 and the average family size was 2.96.

In the town, the population was spread out, with 29.0% under the age of 18, 3.0% from 18 to 24, 25.0% from 25 to 44, 25.0% from 45 to 64, and 18.0% who were 65 years of age or older. The median age was 40 years.

The median income for a household in the town was $14,792, and the median income for a family was $25,000. Males had a median income of $31,875 versus $25,625 for females. The per capita income for the town was $12,676. There were 16.7% of families and 18.8% of the population living below the poverty line, including 30.8% of those over 64.

== Education ==
It is in the Adair Public Schools school district.
