= Boatman, Oklahoma =

- Unincorporated community
- Location within Oklahoma Location within the United States
- Coordinates: 36°15′30″N 95°11′04″W
- Country: United States
- State: Oklahoma
- County: Mayes
- Elevation: 659 ft (201 m)
- Time zone: UTC-6 (Central (CST))
  - Summer (DST): UTC-5 (CDT)
- ZIP Code: 74361 (Pryor)
- Area codes: 539/918
- GNIS feature ID: 1100218

Boatman is an unincorporated community in Mayes County, Oklahoma, United States. Boatman is 10 miles (16 km) by road east-southeast of Pryor Creek. Boatman had a post office from August 28, 1922, to December 30, 1965. The community was named after merchant Joe P. Boatman.
