= Lotsee, Oklahoma =

Lotsee
- Town
- Location within the state of Oklahoma
- Coordinates: 36°8′0″N 96°12′34″W
- Country: United States
- State: Oklahoma
- County: Tulsa

Area
  - Total: 0.015 sq mi (0.04 km^{2})
  - Land: 0.015 sq mi (0.04 km^{2})
  - Water: 0 sq mi (0.00 km^{2})

Population (2020)
  - Total: 6
  - Density: 354.8/sq mi (136.97/km^{2})
- Time zone: UTC-6 (Central (CST))
  - Summer (DST): UTC-5 (CST)
- FIPS code: 40-44100

Lotsee is a town in Tulsa County, Oklahoma, United States. The population was 6 at the 2020 census, compared to a total of 2 in 2010. It is the fourth smallest incorporated municipality in Oklahoma, tied with the town of Knowles, Oklahoma. and in an article on “The Tiniest Town in Every State” by House Beautiful in November 2023, it was cited as the tiniest town in Oklahoma as it had only two people.

The entire town is a 2,000 acres (8.1 km^{2}) family-owned cattle and pecan ranch, the Flying G Ranch, whose owner, George Campbell, incorporated it in 1963. The population peaked at 16 in 1970, then declined to 7 in 1980.

== Geography ==
Lotsee is located 0.5 miles (0.80 km) south of the Arkansas River.

According to the United States Census Bureau, the town has a total area of 0.02 square miles (0.052 km^{2}), all land.

== Demographics ==
Historical population
Census	Pop.	Note	%±
1970	16		—
1980	7		−56.2%
1990	7		0.0%
2000	11		57.1%
2010	2		−81.8%
2020	6		200.0%
U.S. Decennial Census

In 2010, the only residents were Lotsee Spradling, daughter of the founder, and her husband Mike. They have no plans to dissolve the town.

=== 2020 census ===
As of the 2020 census, Lotsee had a population of 6. The median age was 21.5 years. 33.3% of residents were under the age of 18 and 16.7% of residents were 65 years of age or older. For every 100 females there were 20.0 males, and for every 100 females age 18 and over there were 0.0 males age 18 and over.

0.0% of residents lived in urban areas, while 100.0% lived in rural areas.

There were 0 households in Lotsee. No households had children under the age of 18. There were no households headed by a single male or single female householder. There were no one-person households, including anyone living alone who was 65 years of age or older.

There was 1 housing unit, and all were vacant (100.0%). The homeowner vacancy rate was 0.0% and the rental vacancy rate was 100.0%.

Racial composition as of the 2020 census
Race	Number	Percent
White	2	33.3%
Black or African American	0	0.0%
American Indian and Alaska Native	0	0.0%
Asian	0	0.0%
Native Hawaiian and Other Pacific Islander	0	0.0%
Some other race	2	33.3%
Two or more races	2	33.3%
Hispanic or Latino (of any race)	3	50.0%

=== 2000 census ===
As of the census of 2000, there were 11 people, 3 households, and 3 families residing in the town. The population density was 576.1 inhabitants per square mile (222.4/km^{2}). There were 3 housing units at an average density of 157.1 units per square mile (60.7 units/km^{2}). The racial makeup of the town was 27.27% White and 72.73% Native American.

There were 3 households, one of which had a child under the age of 18, all were small families, the average household size was 3.67 and the average family size was 3.67.

In the town, the population was spread out, with 27.3% under the age of 18, 36.4% from 25 to 44, and 36.4% from 45 to 64. The median age was 32 years. For every 100 females, there were 83.3 males. For every 100 females age 18 and over, there were 100.0 males.

The median income for a household in the town was $152,338, and the median income for a family was $152,338. Males had a median income of $11,250 versus $51,875 for females. The per capita income for the town was $41,917. None of the population and none of the families were below the poverty line.
