= Territorial Commercial District =

Historic district in Oklahoma, United States

- U.S. National Register of Historic Places
- Location within Oklahoma
- Location: Main St., Chouteau, Oklahoma
- Coordinates: 36°11′12″N 95°20′41″W
- Area: less than one acre
- Built: 1903
- NRHP reference No.: 83002093
- Added to NRHP: September 22, 1983

The Territorial Commercial District in Chouteau, Oklahoma is a historic district along Main St. which was listed on the National Register of Historic Places in 1983. The listing included three contributing buildings.

It consists of three side-by-side brick buildings, all built in 1903. They all have flat roofs and parapets, and they share common walls between them. All three have pilasters separating storefronts or accentuating corners. They are:

- the Gray and Atkins Merchantile Store (1903), two-stories tall, which has two-story pilasters, and has semi-elliptical and round arches over doorways and some window openings, and a somewhat projecting cornice;
- Will Crockett's General Store (1903), a one-story building;
- Griffin's Grocery and Chofceau Cafe (1903), two-stories tall, also with a somewhat projecting cornice and two-story pilasters, and some semi-elliptical arches over window openings on its west side.
