= Grand Lake Towne, Oklahoma =

- Town
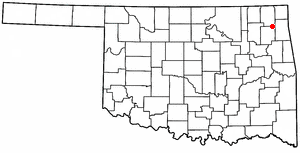
- Location in Oklahoma
- Coordinates: 36°30′17″N 95°01′31″W
- Country: United States
- State: Oklahoma
- County: Mayes

Area
  - Total: 0.14 sq mi (0.35 km^{2})
  - Land: 0.14 sq mi (0.35 km^{2})
  - Water: 0 sq mi (0.00 km^{2})
- Elevation: 791 ft (241 m)

Population (2020)
  - Total: 80
  - Density: 599.0/sq mi (231.29/km^{2})
- Time zone: UTC-6 (Central (CST))
  - Summer (DST): UTC-5 (CDT)
- ZIP Code: 74349 (Ketchum)
- FIPS code: 40-30900
- GNIS feature ID: 2412702

Grand Lake Towne is a town in Mayes County, Oklahoma, United States. The population was 80 at the 2020 census.

== Geography ==
Grand Lake Towne is in the northeastern corner of Mayes County. It is bordered to the north by the town of Ketchum and sits on a small peninsula bordered to the north, east, and south by the Grand Lake o' the Cherokees. The center of Ketchum is 2 miles (3 km) to the north, and Langley is 6 miles (10 km) by road to the southwest.

According to the U.S. Census Bureau, Grand Lake Towne has a total area of 0.13 square miles (0.34 km^{2}), all land.

== Demographics ==
Historical population
Census	Pop.	Note	%±
1970	23		—
1980	36		56.5%
1990	58		61.1%
2000	65		12.1%
2010	74		13.8%
2020	80		8.1%
U.S. Decennial Census

Grand Lake Towne was first developed and incorporated in the early 1960s by George Creager of Oklahoma City.

As of June 2022, Kenneth Calhoun holds the position of Mayor and representative for the town.

=== 2020 census ===
As of the 2020 census, Grand Lake Towne had a population of 80. The median age was 64.3 years. 8.7% of residents were under the age of 18 and 47.5% of residents were 65 years of age or older. For every 100 females there were 95.1 males, and for every 100 females age 18 and over there were 97.3 males age 18 and over.

0.0% of residents lived in urban areas, while 100.0% lived in rural areas.

There were 37 households in Grand Lake Towne, of which 29.7% had children under the age of 18 living in them. Of all households, 56.8% were married-couple households, 13.5% were households with a male householder and no spouse or partner present, and 21.6% were households with a female householder and no spouse or partner present. About 16.2% of all households were made up of individuals and 13.5% had someone living alone who was 65 years of age or older.

There were 68 housing units, of which 45.6% were vacant. The homeowner vacancy rate was 0.0% and the rental vacancy rate was 16.7%.

Racial composition as of the 2020 census
Race	Number	Percent
White	65	81.2%
Black or African American	0	0.0%
American Indian and Alaska Native	9	11.2%
Asian	0	0.0%
Native Hawaiian and Other Pacific Islander	0	0.0%
Some other race	0	0.0%
Two or more races	6	7.5%
Hispanic or Latino (of any race)	1	1.2%

=== 2010 census ===
As of 2010 Grand Lake Towne had a population of 74. The median age was 55.2. The racial and ethnic composition of the population was 77.0% white, 18.9% Native American, and 4.1% reporting being both white and Native American. 1.4% of the population was Hispanic or Latino.

=== 2000 census ===
As of the census of 2000, there were 65 people, 31 households, and 23 families residing in the town. The population density was 428.6 inhabitants per square mile (165.5/km^{2}). There were 61 housing units at an average density of 402.2 per square mile (155.3/km^{2}). The racial makeup of the town was 90.77% White, 7.69% Native American, and 1.54% from two or more races.

There were 31 households, out of which 19.4% had children under the age of 18 living with them, 71.0% were married couples living together, and 25.8% were non-families. 25.8% of all households were made up of individuals, and 6.5% had someone living alone who was 65 years of age or older. The average household size was 2.10 and the average family size was 2.48.

In the town, the population was spread out, with 18.5% under the age of 18, 1.5% from 18 to 24, 13.8% from 25 to 44, 43.1% from 45 to 64, and 23.1% who were 65 years of age or older. The median age was 51 years. For every 100 females, there were 91.2 males. For every 100 females age 18 and over, there were 103.8 males.

The median income for a household in the town was $39,792, and the median income for a family was $39,792. Males had a median income of $35,000 versus $31,250 for females. The per capita income for the town was $30,824. None of the population and none of the families were below the poverty line.

== Education ==
It is in the Ketchum Public Schools school district.
