= Pensacola, Oklahoma =

- Town
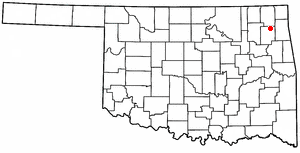
- Location in Oklahoma
- Coordinates: 36°27′33″N 95°07′39″W
- Country: United States
- State: Oklahoma
- County: Mayes

Area
  - Total: 0.30 sq mi (0.78 km^{2})
  - Land: 0.30 sq mi (0.78 km^{2})
  - Water: 0 sq mi (0.00 km^{2})
- Elevation: 653 ft (199 m)

Population (2020)
  - Total: 101
  - Density: 337.1/sq mi (130.15/km^{2})
- Time zone: UTC-6 (Central (CST))
  - Summer (DST): UTC-5 (CDT)
- ZIP Code: 74301
- FIPS code: 40-58050
- GNIS feature ID: 2413125

Pensacola is a town in Mayes County, Oklahoma, United States. The population was 101 at the 2020 census, down from 125 in 2010.

== History ==
The history of Pensacola began circa 1840, with the establishment of a way station on the old Texas Road at the Cabin Creek Crossing of the Grand River (present-day Neosho River). Here, Joseph Lynch Martin (a.k.a. "Greenbrier Joe") established a trading post called Pensacola.

The Union Army commandeered Pensacola as a supply station between Fort Scott, Kansas, and Fort Gibson, Indian Territory, during the Civil War. Two battles between Union and Confederate forces occurred here, resulting in the destruction of Pensacola.

Greenbrier Joe's son, Richard Martin, reestablished Pensacola in 1896, with a small store and a post office at his home, 3 miles (5 km) south of the original location.

In 1909, James Sims Wilson, a settler from Kentucky, established a ranch north of Pensacola and east of Grand River. The Missouri, Oklahoma & Gulf Railroad came to this area in 1912. Its right of way crossed the Wilson ranch, and Wilson began planning a townsite that would be served by the Pensacola post office. He filed the Pensacola townsite plat in the office of the county clerk on April 2, 1912. Despite failure of the town bank in 1921 and the onset of the Great Depression, the announcement of a new dam project 5 miles (8 km) to the east led to hope for growth to return. A chamber of commerce formed, and the town incorporated in 1938.

Pensacola never became more than a small country town supported by farming and cattle ranching. It was surrounded on three sides by the Wilson ranch. Moreover, until the Pensacola Dam and good roads were completed in 1943, commerce was limited.

== Geography ==
Pensacola is in northeastern Mayes County along Oklahoma State Highway 28, which leads east 5 miles (8 km) to Langley along the Grand Lake o' the Cherokees, and west 8 miles (13 km) to Adair.

According to the U.S. Census Bureau, the town of Pensacola has a total area of 0.3 square miles (0.8 km^{2}), all land. Big Cabin Creek flows past the northwest edge of the town, entering the Neosho River 1 mile (1.6 km) to the southwest.

== Demographics ==
Historical population
Census	Pop.	Note	%±
1940	93		—
1950	51		−45.2%
1960	28		−45.1%
1970	56		100.0%
1980	82		46.4%
1990	69		−15.9%
2000	71		2.9%
2010	125		76.1%
2020	101		−19.2%
U.S. Decennial Census

=== 2020 census ===
As of the 2020 census, Pensacola had a population of 101. The median age was 41.9 years. 16.8% of residents were under the age of 18 and 19.8% of residents were 65 years of age or older. For every 100 females there were 119.6 males, and for every 100 females age 18 and over there were 110.0 males age 18 and over.

0.0% of residents lived in urban areas, while 100.0% lived in rural areas.

There were 48 households in Pensacola, of which 31.3% had children under the age of 18 living in them. Of all households, 35.4% were married-couple households, 20.8% were households with a male householder and no spouse or partner present, and 31.3% were households with a female householder and no spouse or partner present. About 35.5% of all households were made up of individuals and 18.7% had someone living alone who was 65 years of age or older.

There were 48 housing units, of which 0.0% were vacant. The homeowner vacancy rate was 0.0% and the rental vacancy rate was 0.0%.

Racial composition as of the 2020 census
Race	Number	Percent
White	61	60.4%
Black or African American	0	0.0%
American Indian and Alaska Native	28	27.7%
Asian	5	5.0%
Native Hawaiian and Other Pacific Islander	0	0.0%
Some other race	0	0.0%
Two or more races	7	6.9%
Hispanic or Latino (of any race)	0	0.0%

=== 2010 census ===
As of the 2010 census the population of Pensacola was 125. The racial and ethnic composition of the population was 78.4% White, 15.2% Native American, 0.8% from some other race and 5.6% from two or more races. 1.6% of the population was Hispanic or Latino of any race.

=== 2000 census ===
As of the census of 2000, there were 71 people, 26 households, and 19 families residing in the town. The population density was 497.6 inhabitants per square mile (192.1/km^{2}). There were 31 housing units at an average density of 217.2 per square mile (83.9/km^{2}). The racial makeup of the town was 76.06% White, 12.68% Native American, and 11.27% from two or more races.

There were 26 households, out of which 46.2% had children under the age of 18 living with them, 57.7% were married couples living together, 11.5% had a female householder with no husband present, and 26.9% were non-families. 23.1% of all households were made up of individuals, and 7.7% had someone living alone who was 65 years of age or older. The average household size was 2.73 and the average family size was 3.21.

In the town, the population was spread out, with 32.4% under the age of 18, 4.2% from 18 to 24, 33.8% from 25 to 44, 23.9% from 45 to 64, and 5.6% who were 65 years of age or older. The median age was 36 years. For every 100 females, there were 136.7 males. For every 100 females age 18 and over, there were 140.0 males.

The median income for a household in the town was $28,750, and the median income for a family was $46,250. Males had a median income of $19,583 versus $23,750 for females. The per capita income for the town was $14,102. There were 14.3% of families and 31.7% of the population living below the poverty line, including 75.0% of under eighteens and none of those over 64.

== Education ==
It is in the Adair Public Schools school district.
