= Hoot Owl, Oklahoma =

- Town
- Location within Oklahoma Location within the United States
- Coordinates: 36°21′36″N 95°07′17″W
- Country: United States
- State: Oklahoma
- County: Mayes

Area
  - Total: 0.062 sq mi (0.16 km^{2})
  - Land: 0.058 sq mi (0.15 km^{2})
  - Water: 0 sq mi (0.00 km^{2})
- Elevation: 712 ft (217 m)

Population (2020)
  - Total: 0
  - Density: 0/sq mi (0/km^{2})
- Time zone: UTC-6 (Central (CST))
  - Summer (DST): UTC-5 (CDT)
- FIPS code: 40-36020
- GNIS feature ID: 2412767

Hoot Owl is a town in Mayes County, Oklahoma, As of the 2020 census, the population was 0, down from 4 in 2010, making it the least populated municipality in the U.S State of Oklahoma.

== History ==
Hoot Owl was incorporated in 1977 by a family of three in order to "keep trespassing hunters and other towns from encroaching on their land." In 1992 the town filed to be dissolved after a bank foreclosed the property, and the town's two residents, mayor and founder William R. Bradley Jr., and his son, city clerk Robert Bradley, both voted in favor of dissolution. The foreclosing bank filed suit and successfully blocked the dissolution in 1993. The town was then sold to a Tulsa doctor, Thomas Robert, in 1994. Robert told interviewers he intended to use the town as a weekend home.

== Geography ==
Hoot Owl is in northeastern Mayes County, on the eastern shore of Lake Hudson, a reservoir on the Neosho River. It is 12 miles (19 km) by road southwest of Spavinaw and 7 miles (11 km) north of Salina. The town is 2.5 miles (4.0 km) northwest of Oklahoma State Highway 20 at the end of what mapping services label "Hoot Owl Road," but the narrow dead-end road is simply designated as No. 443.5.

According to the U.S. Census Bureau, the site has a total area of 0.06 square miles (0.16 km^{2}), of which 0.001 square miles (0.003 km^{2}), or 1.67%, are water.

== Demographics ==
Historical population
Census	Pop.	Note	%±
1980	3		—
1990	5		66.7%
2000	1		−80.0%
2010	4		300.0%
2020	0		−100.0%
U.S. Decennial Census

Its population peaked at 5 in 1990; the 2000 census initially gave the town a total population of 0, but then revised the figure to 1. A census official explained "We don't have specific information that informs us that there is exactly one person in this town, rather our estimates production programs are designed to allocate fractional shares of the county population to its component place parts, and in this instance, a fractional share is rounded to one person as our estimated total for the town." By 2010, the population had risen to 4.

=== 2020 census ===
As of the 2020 census, Hoot Owl was unpopulated.

Racial composition as of the 2020 census
Race	Number	Percent
White	0	0.0%
Black or African American	0	0.0%
American Indian and Alaska Native	0	0.0%
Asian	0	0.0%
Native Hawaiian and Other Pacific Islander	0	0.0%
Some other race	0	0.0%
Two or more races	0	0.0%
Hispanic or Latino (of any race)	0	0.0%

== Education ==
It is in the Salina Public Schools school district.
