= Adair Independent School District =

School district in Oklahoma

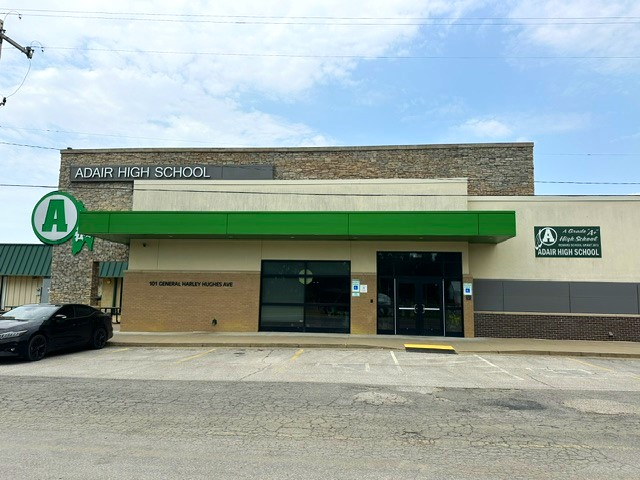

Location
- Adair, Oklahoma United States

District information
- Type: Public
- Grades: K-12

Students and staff
- Students: 1,010

Other information
- Website: www.adair.k12.ok.us

The Adair Independent School District is a school district based in Adair, Oklahoma (United States). The district includes three schools and serves more than 1,010 students.

The district includes Adair, Pensacola, Strang, and a northern part of Spavinaw.

The school received a grade of A on its 2012 district report card.

Adair High School is earned a grade of A on the 2012 district report card and is one of the six top performing schools to receive a Reward School grant from the state school board. The district also includes Adair Middle School and Adair Elementary School.

== Curriculum ==
The Adair Independent School District is required by Oklahoma state law to offer a number of courses to help students meet graduation standards including English; state, national and world history; science; mathematics; physical education; foreign language; and health education.

== Extracurricular activities ==
Adair High School lists four extracurricular activities on the school website. The Adair Future Farmers of America provides leadership and agricultural education outside the classroom. Other extracurricular activities include Robotics, the Adair Winter Guard and band. The Adair Elementary School offers Ms. Brown's Busy Bees.

== See also ==
- List of school districts in Oklahoma
