= Sportsmen Acres, Oklahoma =

- Town
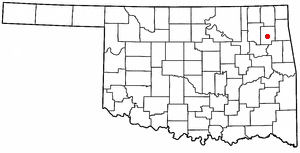
- Location in Oklahoma
- Coordinates: 36°14′45″N 95°15′05″W
- Country: United States
- State: Oklahoma
- County: Mayes

Area
  - Total: 0.085 sq mi (0.22 km^{2})
  - Land: 0.085 sq mi (0.22 km^{2})
  - Water: 0 sq mi (0.00 km^{2})
- Elevation: 614 ft (187 m)

Population (2020)
  - Total: 317
  - Density: 3,803.6/sq mi (1,468.56/km^{2})
- Time zone: UTC-6 (Central (CST))
  - Summer (DST): UTC-5 (CDT)
- ZIP Code: 74361 (Pryor)
- FIPS code: 40-69400
- GNIS feature ID: 2413317

Sportsmen Acres is a town in Mayes County, Oklahoma, United States. The population was 317 at the 2020 census. Incorporated in 1972, Sportsmen Acres is primarily a residential community.

== Geography ==
The town is in central Mayes County, 7 miles (11 km) southeast of Pryor on Oklahoma State Highway 69A, and one mile east of the MidAmerica Industrial Park. According to the U.S. Census Bureau, the town has a total area of 0.1 square miles (0.26 km^{2}), all land.

== Demographics ==
Historical population
| Census | Pop. | Note | %± |
|---|---|---|---|
| 1980 | 218 | | — |
| 1990 | 181 | | −17.0% |
| 2000 | 204 | | 12.7% |
| 2010 | 322 | | 57.8% |
| 2020 | 317 | | −1.6% |
U.S. Decennial Census

=== 2020 census ===
As of the 2020 census, Sportsmen Acres had a population of 317. The median age was 27.8 years. 36.9% of residents were under the age of 18 and 6.3% of residents were 65 years of age or older. For every 100 females there were 120.1 males, and for every 100 females age 18 and over there were 102.0 males age 18 and over.

0.0% of residents lived in urban areas, while 100.0% lived in rural areas.

There were 98 households in Sportsmen Acres, of which 50.0% had children under the age of 18 living in them. Of all households, 38.8% were married-couple households, 27.6% were households with a male householder and no spouse or partner present, and 22.4% were households with a female householder and no spouse or partner present. About 24.4% of all households were made up of individuals and 3.0% had someone living alone who was 65 years of age or older.

There were 111 housing units, of which 11.7% were vacant. The homeowner vacancy rate was 0.0% and the rental vacancy rate was 17.7%.

Racial composition as of the 2020 census
| Race | Number | Percent |
|---|---|---|
| White | 173 | 54.6% |
| Black or African American | 0 | 0.0% |
| American Indian and Alaska Native | 88 | 27.8% |
| Asian | 5 | 1.6% |
| Native Hawaiian and Other Pacific Islander | 0 | 0.0% |
| Some other race | 3 | 0.9% |
| Two or more races | 48 | 15.1% |
| Hispanic or Latino (of any race) | 8 | 2.5% |

=== 2010 census ===
As of 2010 Sportsmen Acres had a population of 322. The racial and ethnic composition of the population was 70.5% white, 20.2% Native American, 0.3% Filipino, 1.2% from some other race and 7.8% from two or more races. 2.8% of the population was Hispanic or Latino of any race.

=== 2000 census ===
As of the census of 2000, there were 204 people, 58 households, and 52 families residing in the town. The population density was 2,456.8 inhabitants per square mile (948.6/km^{2}). There were 63 housing units at an average density of 758.7 per square mile (292.9/km^{2}). The racial makeup of the town was 85.29% White, 6.37% Native American, 4.90% Asian, and 3.43% from two or more races. Hispanic or Latino of any race were 0.49% of the population.

There were 58 households, out of which 55.2% had children under the age of 18 living with them, 81.0% were married couples living together, 6.9% had a female householder with no husband present, and 10.3% were non-families. 8.6% of all households were made up of individuals, and 3.4% had someone living alone who was 65 years of age or older. The average household size was 3.52 and the average family size was 3.73.

In the town, the population was spread out, with 36.3% under the age of 18, 12.3% from 18 to 24, 25.5% from 25 to 44, 21.6% from 45 to 64, and 4.4% who were 65 years of age or older. The median age was 26 years. For every 100 females, there were 85.5 males. For every 100 females age 18 and over, there were 88.4 males.

The median income for a household in the town was $37,222, and the median income for a family was $38,333. Males had a median income of $30,909 versus $21,000 for females. The per capita income for the town was $14,233. About 3.6% of families and 4.6% of the population were below the poverty line, including 7.1% of those under the age of eighteen and none of those 65 or over.

== Education ==
It is mostly in the Salina Public Schools school district, with a western part in the Pryor Public Schools school district.
