= Neosho River =

River in Kansas and Oklahoma, U.S.

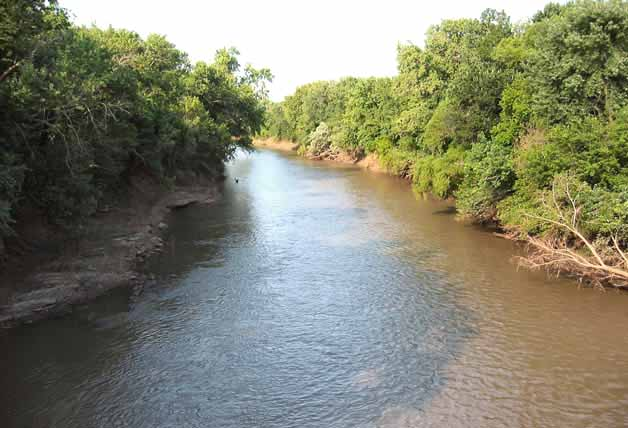
- Neosho River near Neosho Rapids, Kansas

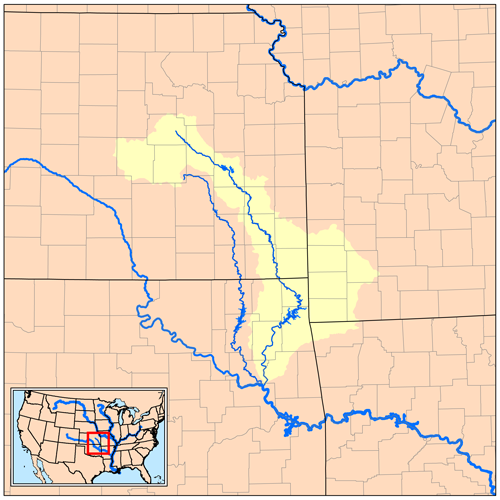
- Map of the Neosho River and its watershed

Location
- Country: United States
- State: Kansas, Oklahoma

Physical characteristics
- Source: Near White City, Kansas
  - coordinates: 38°47′22″N 96°44′39″W
  - elevation: 1,450 ft (440 m)
- Mouth: Arkansas River
  - coordinates: 35°47′32″N 95°17′40″W
  - elevation: 489 ft (149 m)
- Length: 463 mi (745 km)
- Basin size: 11,534 sq mi (29,870 km^{2})
- Discharge
  - location: USGS gage 07191500 near Chouteau, OK
  - average: 8,954 cu ft/s (253.5 m^{3}/s)
  - minimum: 12 cu ft/s (0.34 m^{3}/s)
  - maximum: 154,000 cu ft/s (4,400 m^{3}/s)

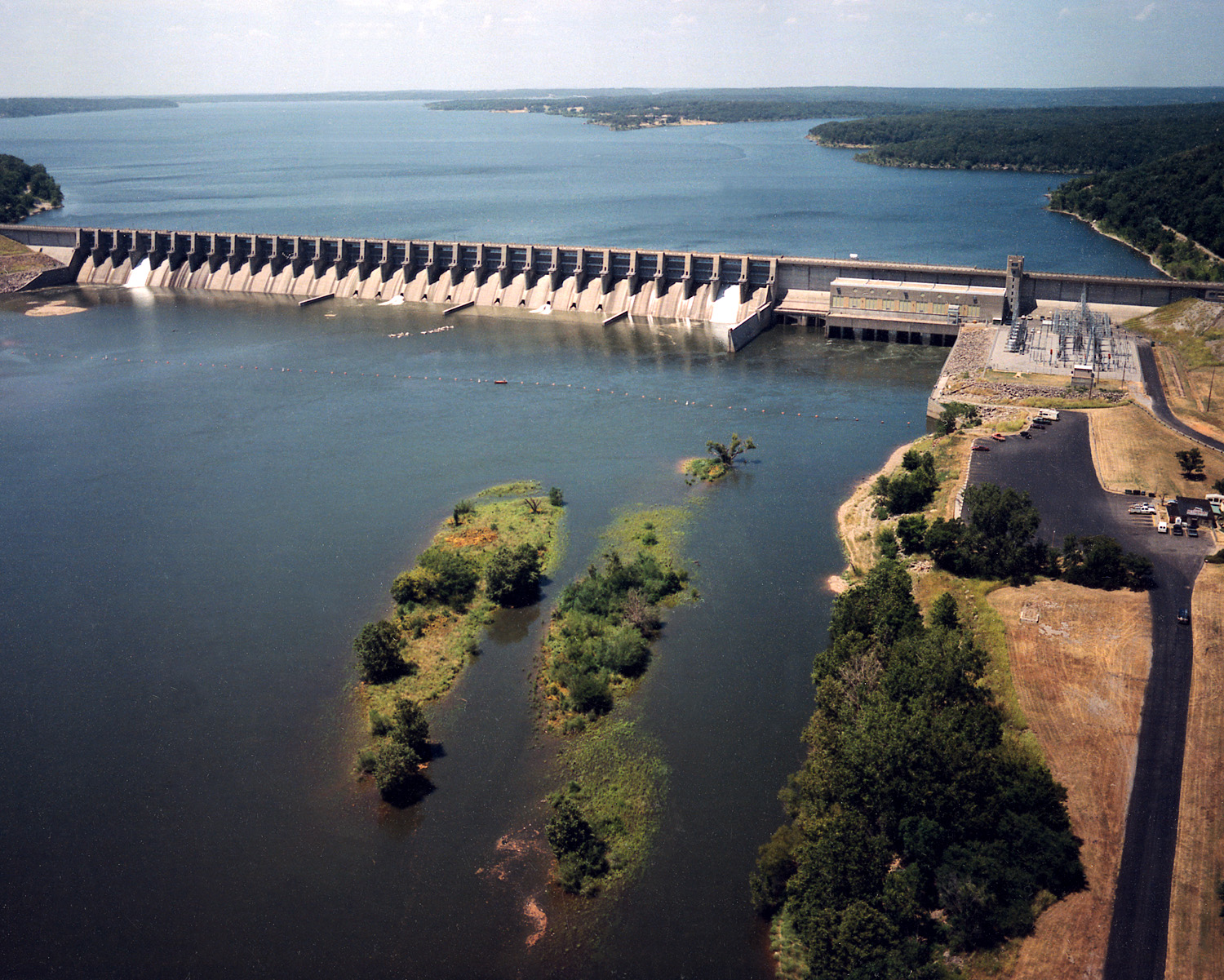
Fort Gibson Dam and Reservoir on the Grand River in Cherokee and Wagoner Counties, Oklahoma

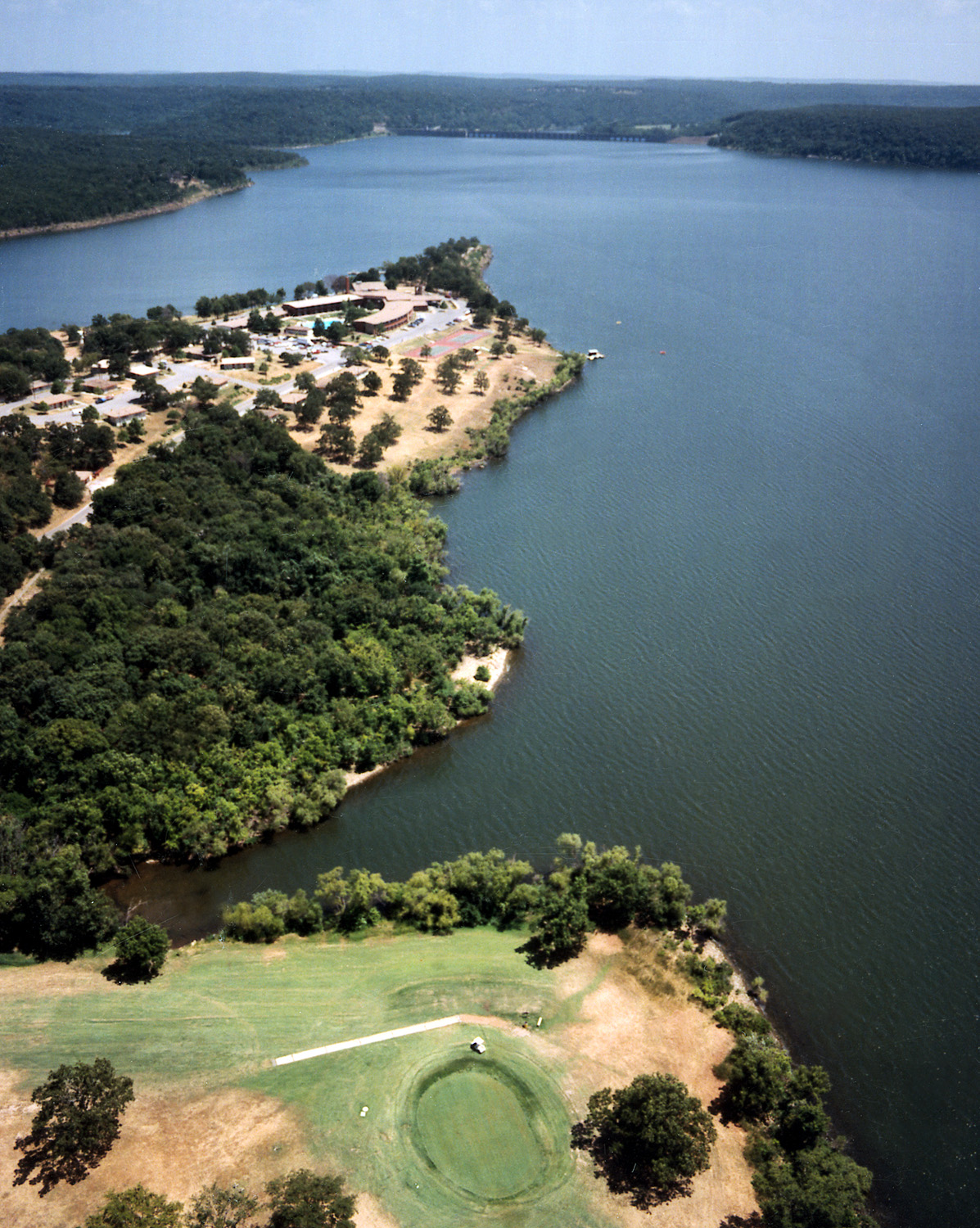
Fort Gibson Lake and Sequoyah State Park on the Grand River in Cherokee County, Oklahoma

The Neosho River is a tributary of the Arkansas River in eastern Kansas and northeastern Oklahoma in the United States. Its tributaries also drain portions of Missouri and Arkansas. The river is about 463 miles (745 km) long. Via the Arkansas, it is part of the Mississippi River watershed. Its name is an Osage word meaning "clear water." The lower section is also known as the Grand River.

== Course ==
The Neosho's headwaters are in Morris County, Kansas, and it flows southeast through Kansas. In Ottawa County, Oklahoma, the river turns south-southwest for the remainder of its course through Oklahoma. It meets the Arkansas River near the city of Muskogee, about a mile downstream of the confluence of the Arkansas River and the Verdigris River. The area of convergence of the three rivers Arkansas, Verdigris and Neosho is called "Three Forks."

In Oklahoma the Neosho ends at its confluence with Spring River at the Twin Bridges Area at Grand Lake State Park. From that point on it is called the Grand River. The Grand River flows south to the Grand Lake.

== Dams ==
The Neosho has been dammed at several points along its course, in most cases by the U.S. Army Corps of Engineers. In Kansas, a dam upstream of Council Grove forms Council Grove Lake, and a dam near New Strawn forms John Redmond Reservoir. There are also 12 dams in between John Redmond and the Kansas border, including lowhead dams at Burlington, Neosho Falls, Ottawa, Iola, Humboldt, two near Chanute and Erie. It was also dammed to provide water for the city of Parsons, and is also dammed at the former Kansas Gas & Electric Power Plant at Strauss, as well as at Oswego and Chetopa. In Oklahoma, Pensacola Dam at Langley forms the Neosho's largest reservoir, the Grand Lake o' the Cherokees. Robert S. Kerr Dam near Locust Grove forms Lake Hudson, (also known as Markham Ferry Reservoir), and a dam upstream of Fort Gibson forms Fort Gibson Lake.

== Tributaries ==
In Kansas, the Neosho is joined by the Cottonwood River in Lyon County. In Oklahoma, it is joined by the Spring River in Ottawa County and the Elk River in Delaware County.

== Cities and towns along the river ==
- Americus, Kansas
- Bassett, Kansas
- Burlington, Kansas
- Chetopa, Kansas
- Chanute, Kansas
- Chouteau, Oklahoma
- Council Grove, Kansas
- Disney, Oklahoma
- Emporia, Kansas
- Erie, Kansas
- Fort Gibson, Oklahoma
- Grand Lake Towne, Oklahoma
- Harmon, Kansas
- Hartford, Kansas
- Hoag, Kansas
- Humboldt, Kansas
- Iola, Kansas
- Laneville, Kansas
- Langley, Oklahoma
- Le Roy, Kansas
- Miami, Oklahoma
- Montana, Kansas
- Neosho Falls, Kansas
- Neosho Rapids, Kansas
- Oswego, Kansas
- Parkerville, Kansas
- Pensacola, Oklahoma
- Petrolia, Kansas
- Pin Oak Acres, Oklahoma
- Rollin, Kansas
- Salina, Oklahoma
- Saulkner, Kansas
- Strang, Oklahoma
- St. Paul, Kansas
- Shaw, Kansas
- Strauss, Kansas

== Variant names ==
According to the Geographic Names Information System, the Neosho River has also been known as:

- Grand River, particularly past the confluence of the Neosho and Spring rivers in Oklahoma—see Grand River (Oklahoma)
- Le Grande Riviere
- Nee Ozho River
- Neozhoo River
- Ni-u-sho River
- Niocho River
- Nion-chou River
- Noshow River
- Osage River
- Rio Blanco
- Six Bulls River

== See also ==
- List of Kansas rivers
- List of Oklahoma rivers
- Great Flood of 1951
