= Chouteau, Oklahoma =

- Town
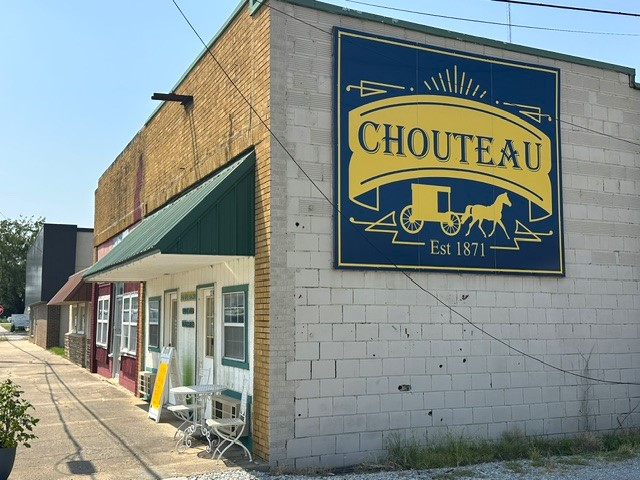
- Main Street in Chouteau in August of 2026

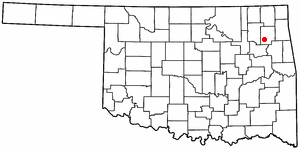
- Location in Oklahoma
- Coordinates: 36°11′22″N 95°20′15″W
- Country: United States
- State: Oklahoma
- County: Mayes

Area
  - Total: 3.36 sq mi (8.71 km^{2})
  - Land: 3.36 sq mi (8.71 km^{2})
  - Water: 0 sq mi (0.00 km^{2})
- Elevation: 623 ft (190 m)

Population (2020)
  - Total: 2,059
  - Density: 612.6/sq mi (236.53/km^{2})
- Time zone: UTC-6 (Central (CST))
  - Summer (DST): UTC-5 (CDT)
- ZIP Code: 74337
- Area codes: 539/918
- FIPS code: 40-14300
- GNIS feature ID: 2413200
- Website: www.chouteauok.com

Chouteau /ʃoʊˈtoʊ/ is the second-largest town in Mayes County, Oklahoma, United States. The population was 2,059 at the 2020 census.

== History ==
Chouteau, originally called "Cody's Creek", became a stop on the Katy railroad in 1871. It soon became a thriving cattle town. The name was changed to Chouteau after the creek that flows north of town that was named for French fur trader Auguste Pierre Chouteau from the Chouteau family. Auguste created the first permanent white settlement in present-day Salina, 13 miles (21 km) northeast of Chouteau.

== Geography ==
Chouteau is in southern Mayes County, near the junction of U.S. Routes 69 and 412. US-69 passes through the town center, leading north 8 miles (13 km) to Pryor Creek, the county seat, and south 16 miles (26 km) to Wagoner. US-412 passes through the southern end of the town, leading west 36 miles (58 km) to Tulsa and east 48 miles (77 km) to Siloam Springs, Arkansas.

According to the U.S. Census Bureau, the town of Chouteau has a total area of 3.4 square miles (8.8 km^{2}), of which 0.001 square miles (0.003 km^{2}), or 0.03%, are water. Chouteau Creek passes to the north and east of the town, flowing to the Neosho River 3 miles (5 km) to the southeast.

== Demographics ==
Historical population
Census	Pop.	Note	%±
1910	483		—
1920	541		12.0%
1930	430		−20.5%
1940	400		−7.0%
1950	658		64.5%
1960	958		45.6%
1970	1,046		9.2%
1980	1,559		49.0%
1990	1,771		13.6%
2000	1,931		9.0%
2010	2,097		8.6%
2020	2,059		−1.8%
U.S. Decennial Census

=== 2020 census ===
As of the 2020 census, Chouteau had a population of 2,059. The median age was 37.1 years. 27.4% of residents were under the age of 18 and 18.7% of residents were 65 years of age or older. For every 100 females there were 93.0 males, and for every 100 females age 18 and over there were 89.6 males age 18 and over.

0.0% of residents lived in urban areas, while 100.0% lived in rural areas.

There were 802 households in Chouteau, of which 33.7% had children under the age of 18 living in them. Of all households, 49.5% were married-couple households, 16.7% were households with a male householder and no spouse or partner present, and 28.7% were households with a female householder and no spouse or partner present. About 27.6% of all households were made up of individuals and 14.0% had someone living alone who was 65 years of age or older.

There were 899 housing units, of which 10.8% were vacant. The homeowner vacancy rate was 1.0% and the rental vacancy rate was 12.6%.

Racial composition as of the 2020 census
Race	Number	Percent
White	1,292	62.7%
Black or African American	8	0.4%
American Indian and Alaska Native	414	20.1%
Asian	2	0.1%
Native Hawaiian and Other Pacific Islander	2	0.1%
Some other race	9	0.4%
Two or more races	332	16.1%
Hispanic or Latino (of any race)	51	2.5%

=== 2010 census ===
As of the 2010 census Chouteau had a population of 2,097. The racial and ethnic composition of the population was 74.9% white, 0.2% black or African American, 16.3% Native American, 0.2% Asian, 0.1% Pacific Islander, 0.2% some other race and 8.1% from two or more races. 1.8% of the population was Hispanic or Latino of any race.

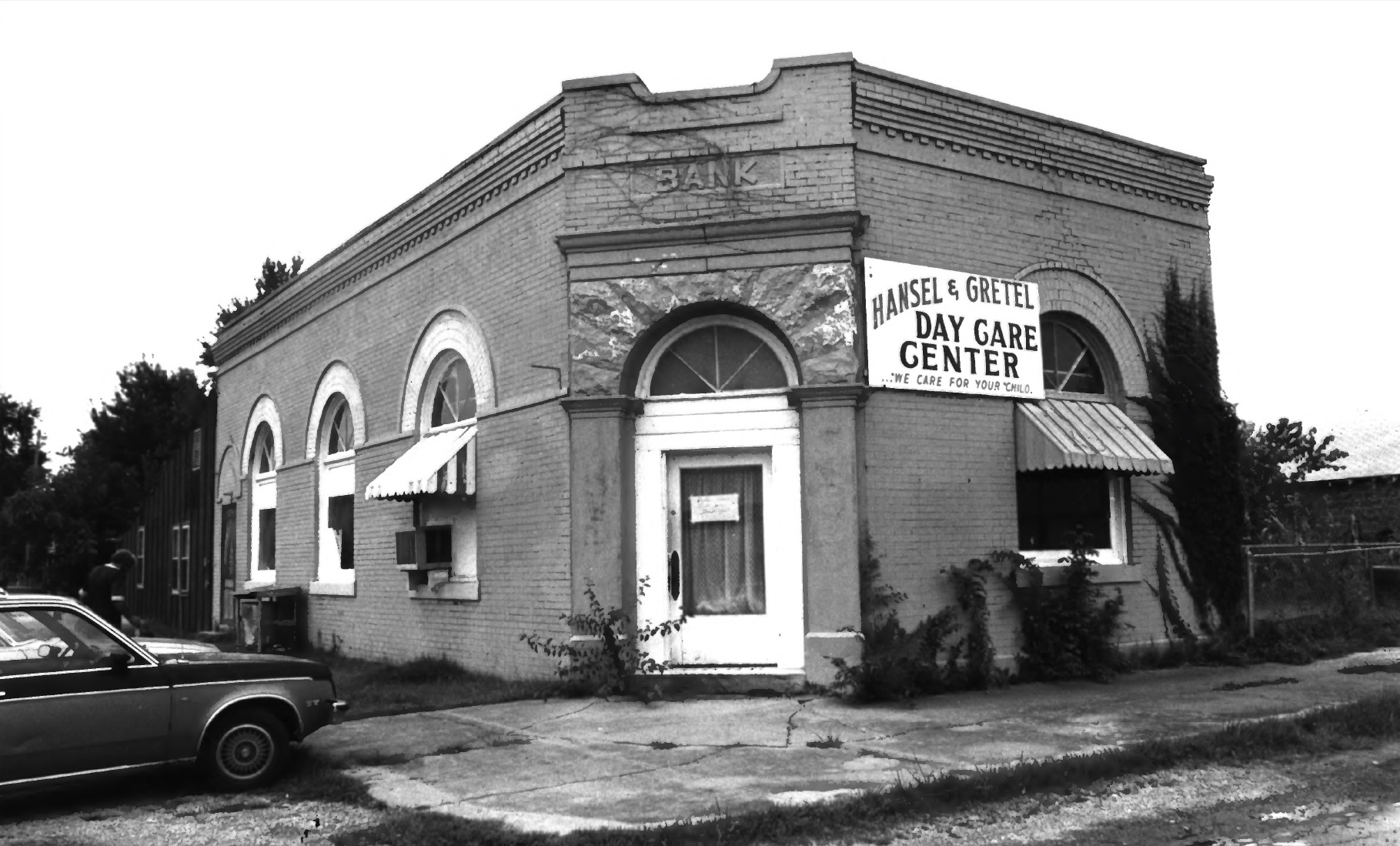
Former Farmers and Merchants Bank building

=== 2000 census ===
As of the census of 2000, there were 1,931 people, 751 households, and 560 families residing in the town. The population density was 808.1 inhabitants per square mile (312.0/km^{2}). There were 806 housing units at an average density of 337.3 per square mile (130.2/km^{2}). The racial makeup of the town was 77.01% White, 0.41% African American, 14.34% Native American, 0.21% Asian, 1.19% from other races, and 6.84% from two or more races. Hispanic or Latino of any race were 1.76% of the population.

There were 751 households, out of which 35.3% had children under the age of 18 living with them, 58.2% were married couples living together, 12.1% had a female householder with no husband present, and 25.4% were non-families. 22.9% of all households were made up of individuals, and 10.3% had someone living alone who was 65 years of age or older. The average household size was 2.52 and the average family size was 2.95.

In the town, the population was spread out, with 26.6% under the age of 18, 8.3% from 18 to 24, 27.1% from 25 to 44, 22.4% from 45 to 64, and 15.7% who were 65 years of age or older. The median age was 37 years. For every 100 females, there were 91.8 males. For every 100 females age 18 and over, there were 91.6 males.

The median income for a household in the town was $32,950, and the median income for a family was $40,109. Males had a median income of $31,750 versus $19,559 for females. The per capita income for the town was $15,482. About 12.2% of families and 14.8% of the population were below the poverty line, including 19.9% of those under age 18 and 11.7% of those age 65 or over. The major employer for Chouteau and the surrounding area is the MidAmerica Industrial Park, located approximately three miles northeast of town.

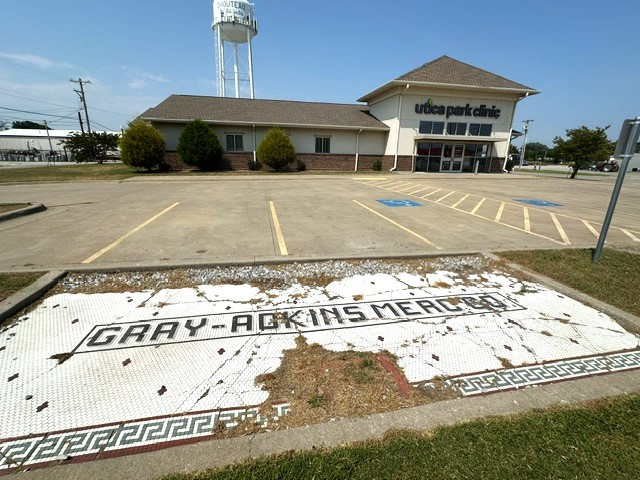
The three 1903 buildings constituting the District were demolished; the tile work in front of the Gray-Adkins Merchantile has been preserved in front of the current location occupant, Utica Park Clinic.

== Historic sites ==
- Territorial Commercial District, consisting of three commercial buildings on Main St. all constructed in 1903 and sharing common walls.
- The Farmers and Merchants Bank at 201 W. Main Street.

== Parks and recreation ==
Chouteau has a number of facilities in its general area, including:

- Guy Williams Park, located in town
- Pryor Creek Golf Course which is 11 miles away
- Lake Hudson which is 17 miles away

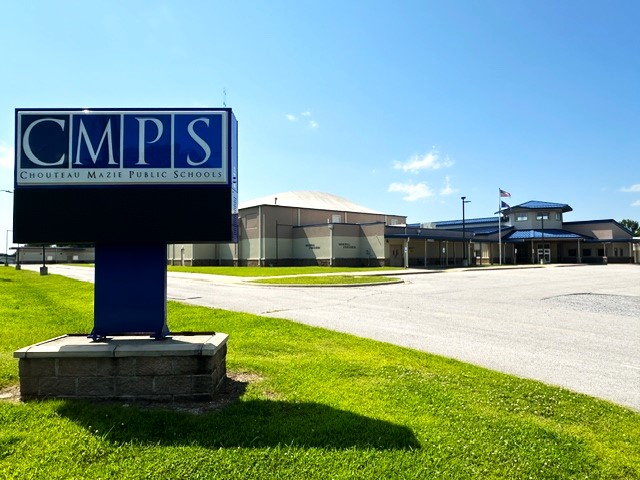
Chouteau Mazie Public Schools campus in Chouteau, 7-2026

- Lake W. R. Holway, formerly Chimney Rock Lake, which is 20 miles away
- Chouteau Bend Recreational Area which is 6 miles away
- Mazie Landing Public Use Area which is 7 miles away
- Fort Gibson Lake, Blue Bill Point which is 14 miles away

== Education ==
It is in the Chouteau-Mazie Public Schools school district.

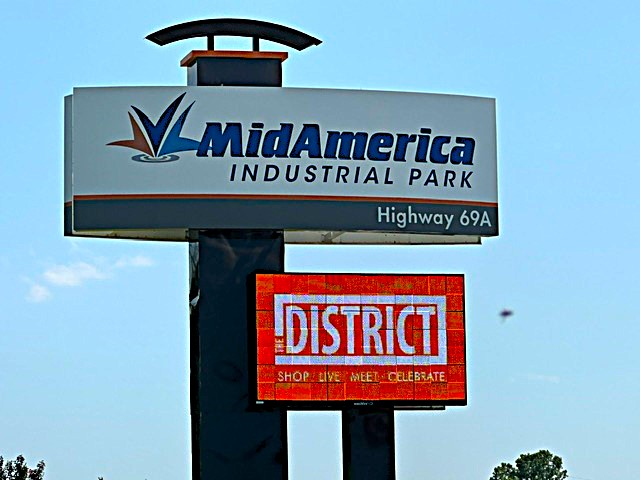
MidAmerica Industrial Park sign, with additional signage for The District retail space, 7-2026

== MidAmerica Industrial Park ==
Located four miles from Chouteau, the MidAmerica Industrial Park houses more than 80 companies, including Fortune 500 leaders such as Google, DuPont and Nordam. The facility includes its own airfield, the MidAmerica Industrial Park Airport, featuring a 5,000 foot runway refurbished in 2016.

== Notable people ==
- Johnny Ray (born 1957) – Major League Baseball player for the Pittsburgh Pirates and California Angels.
