= Langley, Oklahoma =

- Town
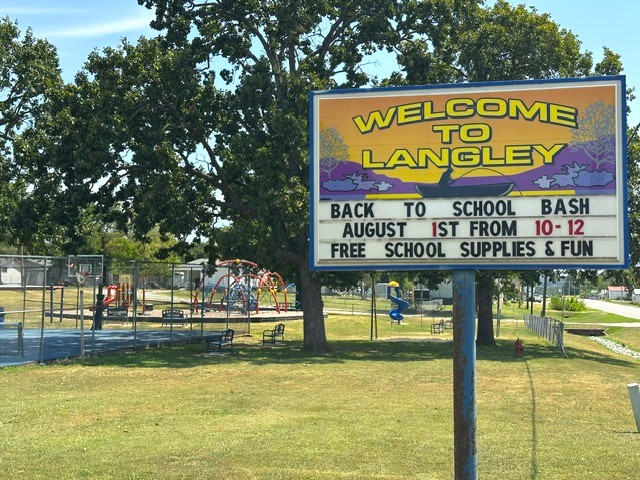
- Welcome Sign in front of Langley Community Park in August of 2026

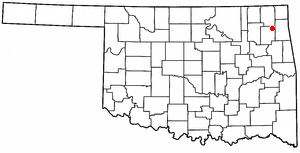
- Location in Oklahoma
- Coordinates: 36°28′8″N 95°02′59″W
- Country: United States
- State: Oklahoma
- Counties: Mayes, Craig

Area
  - Total: 1.51 sq mi (3.9 km^{2})
  - Land: 1.51 sq mi (3.9 km^{2})
  - Water: 0.00 sq mi (0 km^{2})
- Elevation: 768 ft (234 m)

Population (2020)
  - Total: 606
  - Density: 401.6/sq mi (155.1/km^{2})
- Time zone: UTC-6 (Central (CST))
  - Summer (DST): UTC-5 (CDT)
- ZIP Code: 74350
- Area codes: 539/918
- FIPS code: 40-41500
- GNIS feature ID: 2412876
- Website: www.langleyok.gov

Langley is a town in Mayes and Craig counties, Oklahoma, United States. It sits in the foothills of the Ozark Mountains on the coast of Grand Lake o' the Cherokees. The population was 606 at the 2020 census, down from 819 in 2010.

== History ==
Langley, still located at its original site, is on State Highway 82 at the west end of the Pensacola Dam, which is on the National Register of Historic Places and holds back the Grand Lake. Dam construction started in 1935. Cliff Bogle, the original owner in the area, divided his land into lots, and in 1937 the town was established with a public dedication and drawing for free lots. The town was named for Oklahoma State Senator J. Howard Langley. Langley incorporated on November 20, 1939, and a post office was established on January 20, 1939. The dam was completed in 1941, and the town began to promote itself to the recreation industry.

== Geography ==
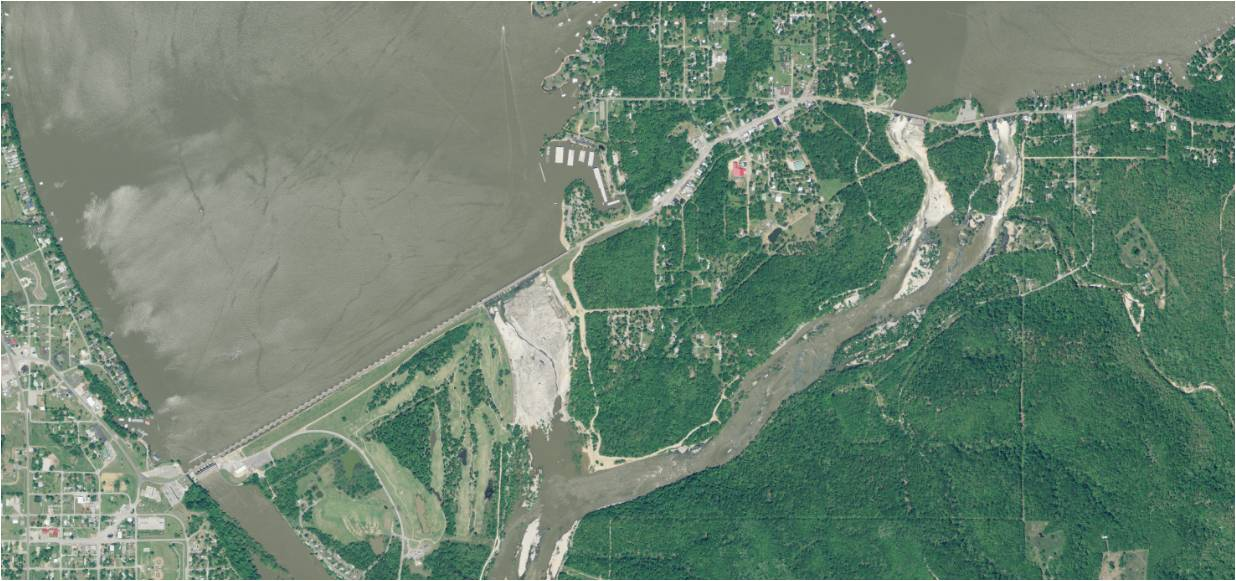
Aerial View of Pensacola Dam with Langley on the left

Langley is near the northeastern corner of Mayes County, with a small portion extending north into Craig County. State Highway 82 passes through the town as Third Street, leading north 17 miles (27 km) to Vinita and south 19 miles (31 km) to Salina. State Highway 28 passes through the north side of Langley, leading east across Pensacola Dam into Disney and leading 19 miles (31 km) to Jay, and leading west from Langley 13 miles (21 km) to Adair.

According to the U.S. Census Bureau, the town of Langley has a total area of 1.5 square miles (3.9 km^{2}), all land. The town is bordered to the east by the Grand Lake o' the Cherokees, a reservoir on the Neosho River.

== Demographics ==
Historical population
| Census | Pop. | Note | %± |
|---|---|---|---|
| 1940 | 838 | | — |
| 1950 | 204 | | −75.7% |
| 1960 | 205 | | 0.5% |
| 1970 | 481 | | 134.6% |
| 1980 | 582 | | 21.0% |
| 1990 | 526 | | −9.6% |
| 2000 | 669 | | 27.2% |
| 2010 | 819 | | 22.4% |
| 2020 | 606 | | −26.0% |
U.S. Decennial Census

=== 2020 census ===
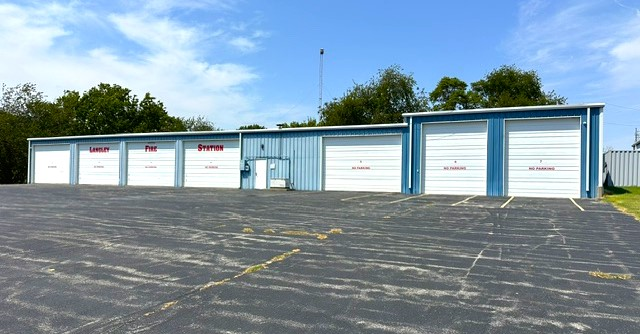
Langley Fire Station in August of 2026

As of the 2020 census, Langley had a population of 606. The median age was 46.7 years. 19.8% of residents were under the age of 18 and 27.1% of residents were 65 years of age or older. For every 100 females there were 106.1 males, and for every 100 females age 18 and over there were 104.2 males age 18 and over.

0.0% of residents lived in urban areas, while 100.0% lived in rural areas.

There were 275 households in Langley, of which 30.9% had children under the age of 18 living in them. Of all households, 41.8% were married-couple households, 24.0% were households with a male householder and no spouse or partner present, and 25.8% were households with a female householder and no spouse or partner present. About 28.7% of all households were made up of individuals and 12.4% had someone living alone who was 65 years of age or older.

There were 360 housing units, of which 23.6% were vacant. The homeowner vacancy rate was 1.4% and the rental vacancy rate was 1.6%.

Racial composition as of the 2020 census
| Race | Number | Percent |
|---|---|---|
| White | 375 | 61.9% |
| Black or African American | 0 | 0.0% |
| American Indian and Alaska Native | 125 | 20.6% |
| Asian | 2 | 0.3% |
| Native Hawaiian and Other Pacific Islander | 1 | 0.2% |
| Some other race | 15 | 2.5% |
| Two or more races | 88 | 14.5% |
| Hispanic or Latino (of any race) | 31 | 5.1% |

=== 2000 census ===
As of the census of 2000, there were 669 people, 274 households, and 187 families residing in the town. The population density was 542.5 inhabitants per square mile (209.5/km^{2}). There were 360 housing units at an average density of 291.9 per square mile (112.7/km^{2}). The racial makeup of the town was 67.41% White, 0.45% African American, 20.03% Native American, 0.30% Asian, 2.24% from other races, and 9.57% from two or more races. Hispanic or Latino of any race were 4.04% of the population.

There were 274 households, out of which 27.0% had children under the age of 18 living with them, 55.5% were married couples living together, 9.1% had a female householder with no husband present, and 31.4% were non-families. 27.0% of all households were made up of individuals, and 14.2% had someone living alone who was 65 years of age or older. The average household size was 2.38 and the average family size was 2.88.

In the town, the population was spread out, with 22.7% under the age of 18, 7.9% from 18 to 24, 24.2% from 25 to 44, 26.0% from 45 to 64, and 19.1% who were 65 years of age or older. The median age was 41 years. For every 100 females, there were 100.3 males. For every 100 females age 18 and over, there were 102.7 males.

The median income for a household in the town was $22,500, and the median income for a family was $26,250. Males had a median income of $26,250 versus $16,731 for females. The per capita income for the town was $11,542. About 22.7% of families and 29.3% of the population were below the poverty line, including 49.0% of those under age 18 and 20.5% of those age 65 or over.

== Education ==
It is in the Ketchum Public Schools school district.
