= Beavers Bend Resort Park =

State park in Oklahoma, United States

Beavers Bend State Park
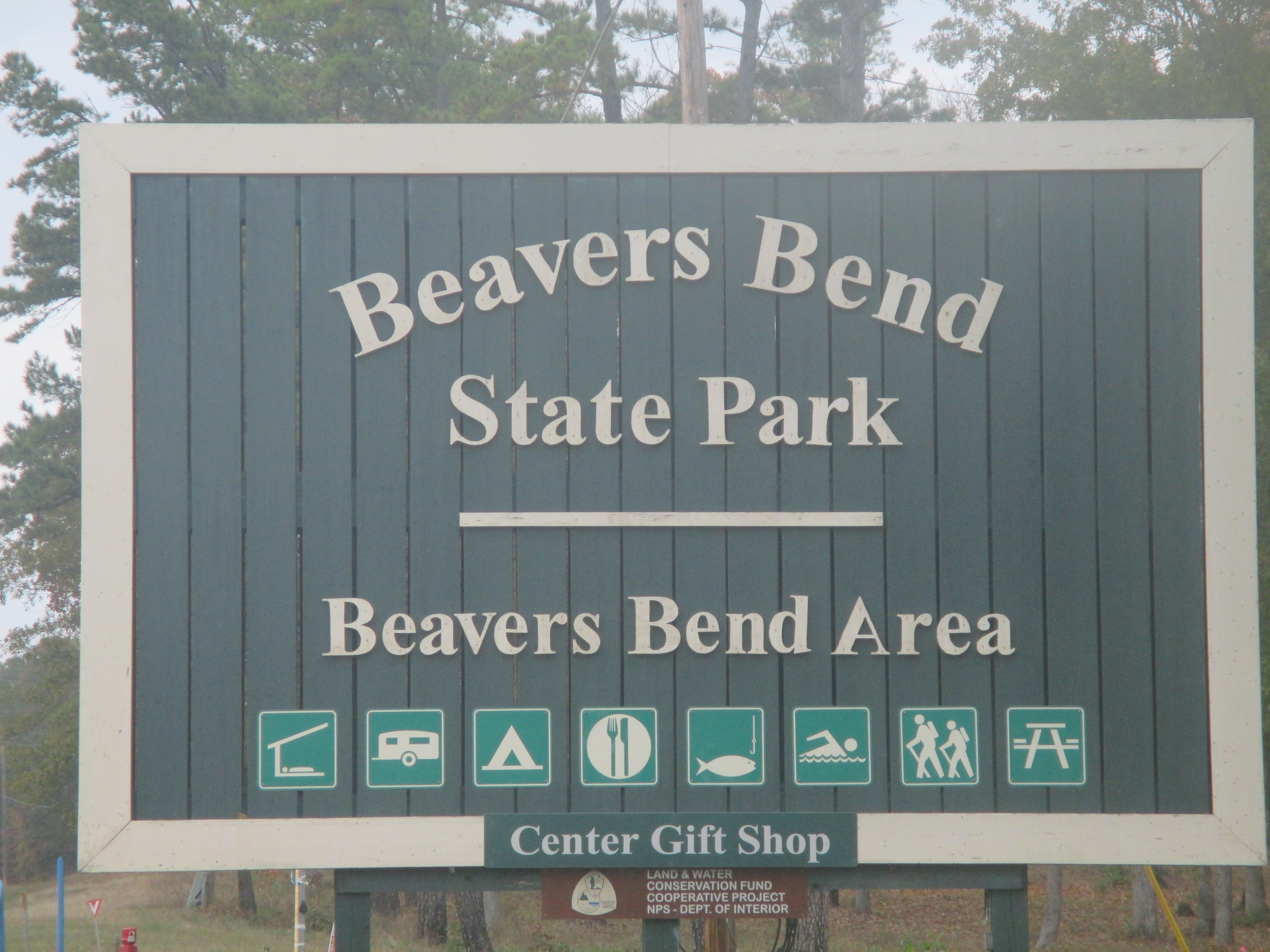

- Location within Oklahoma
- Location: McCurtain County, Oklahoma, United States
- Nearest city: Broken Bow, OK
- Coordinates: 34°07′52″N 94°41′24″W
- Area: 3,482 acres (1,409 ha)
- Created: 1937
- Visitors: 2,283,559 (in 2021)
- Governing body: Oklahoma Department of Tourism and Recreation
- Website: www.travelok.com/state-parks/beavers-bend-state-park

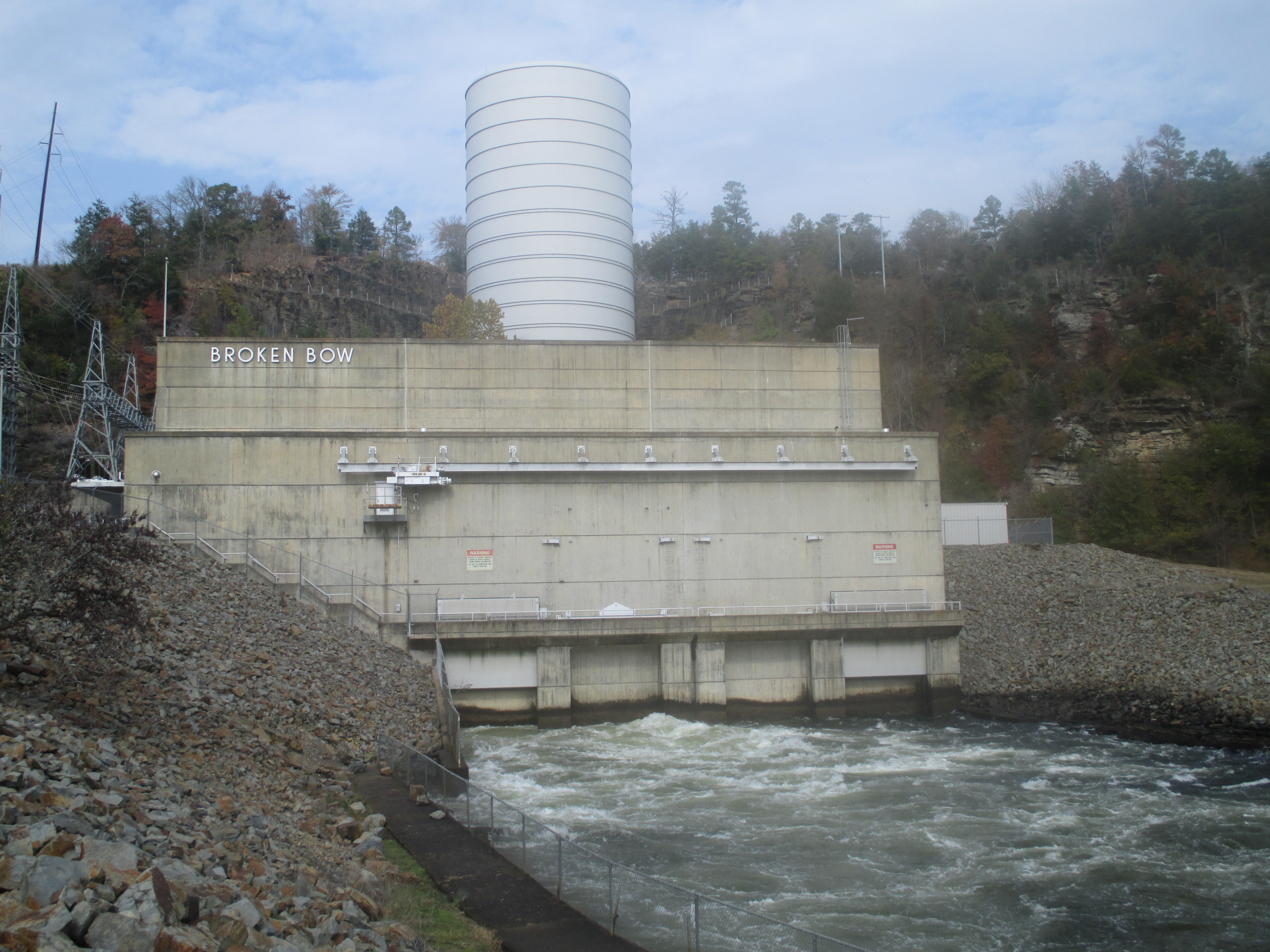
Broken Bow Reservoir is located within the state park.

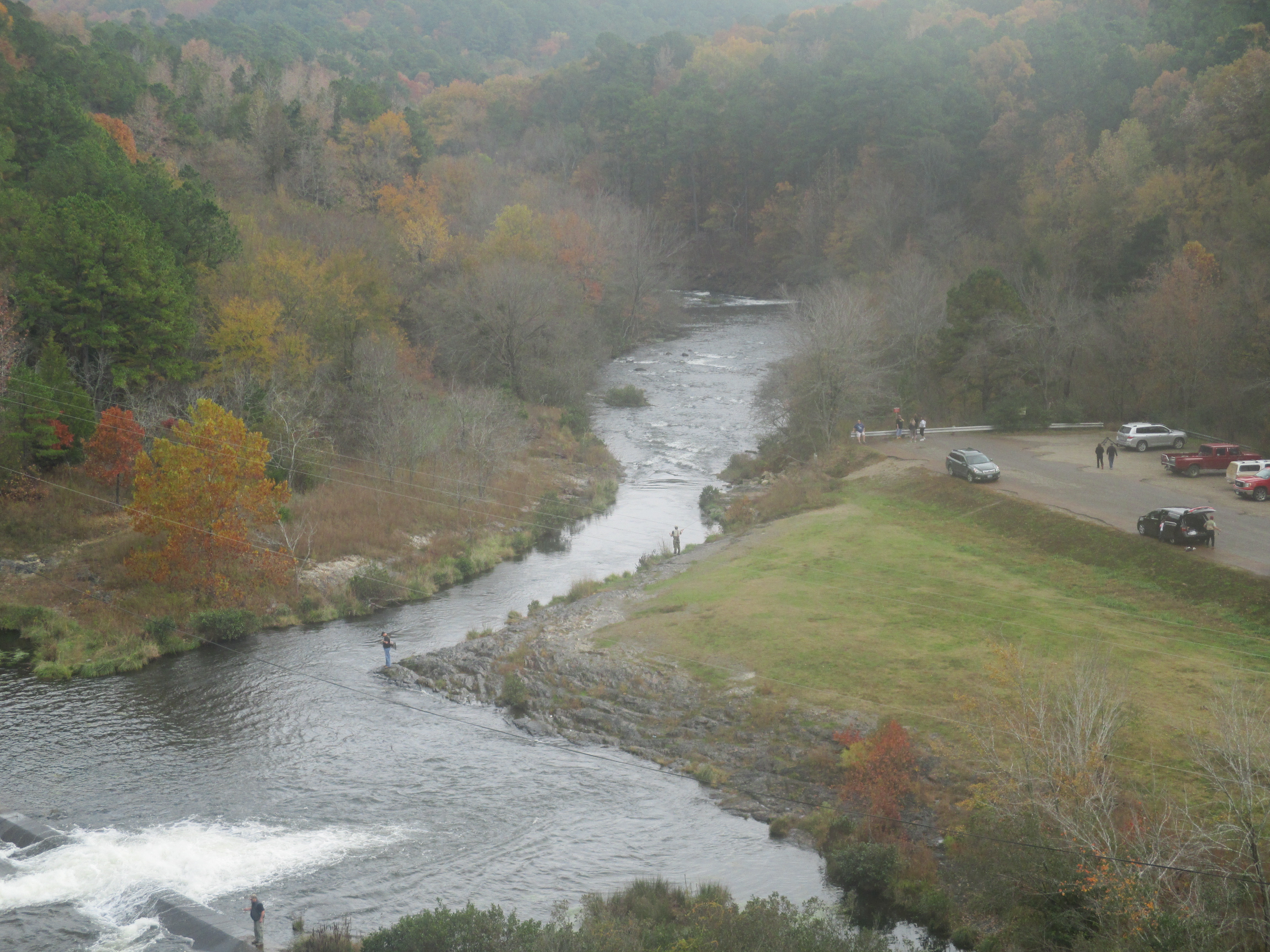
Broken Bow spillway overlook

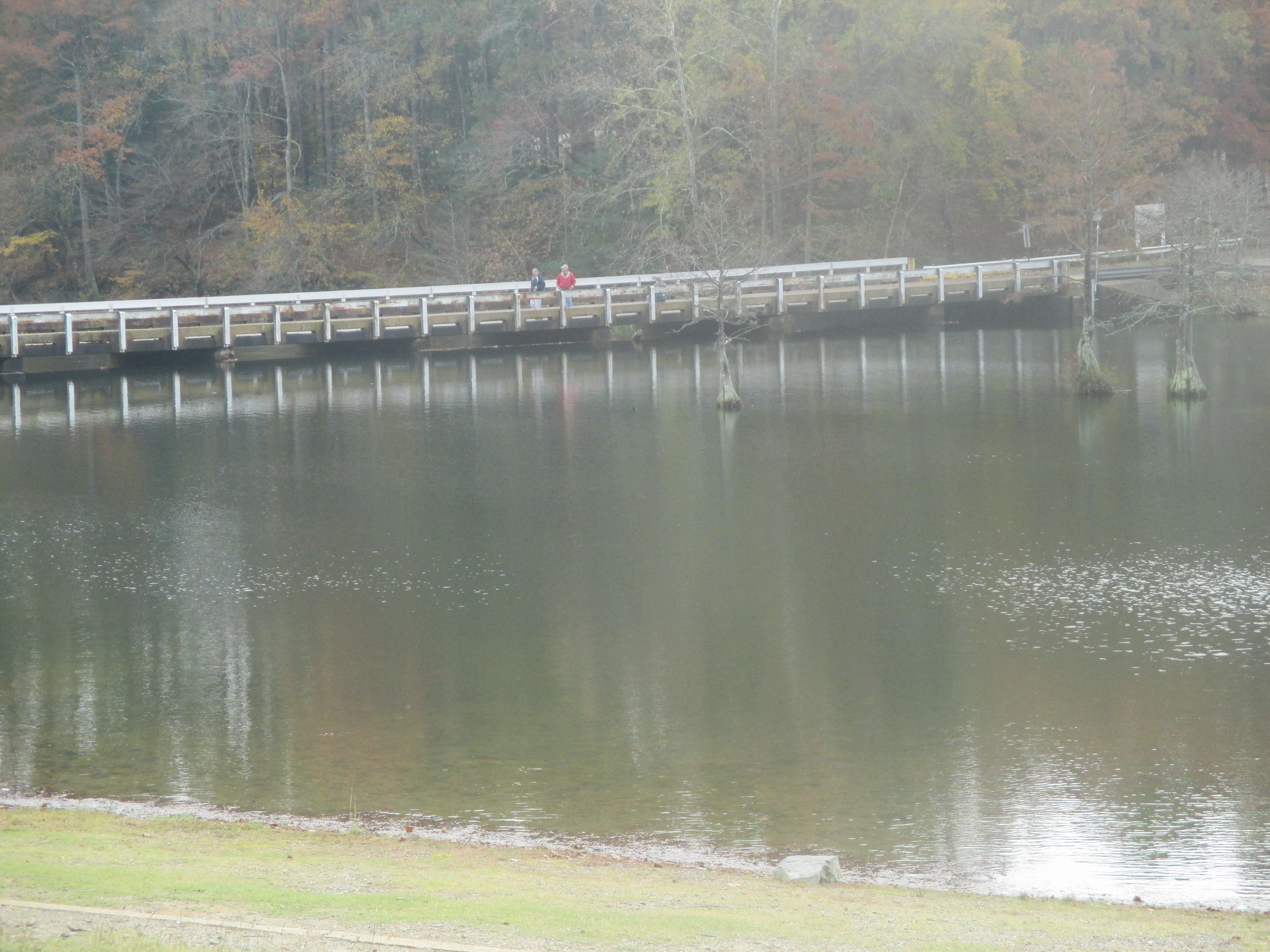
Bridge across Mountain Fork River

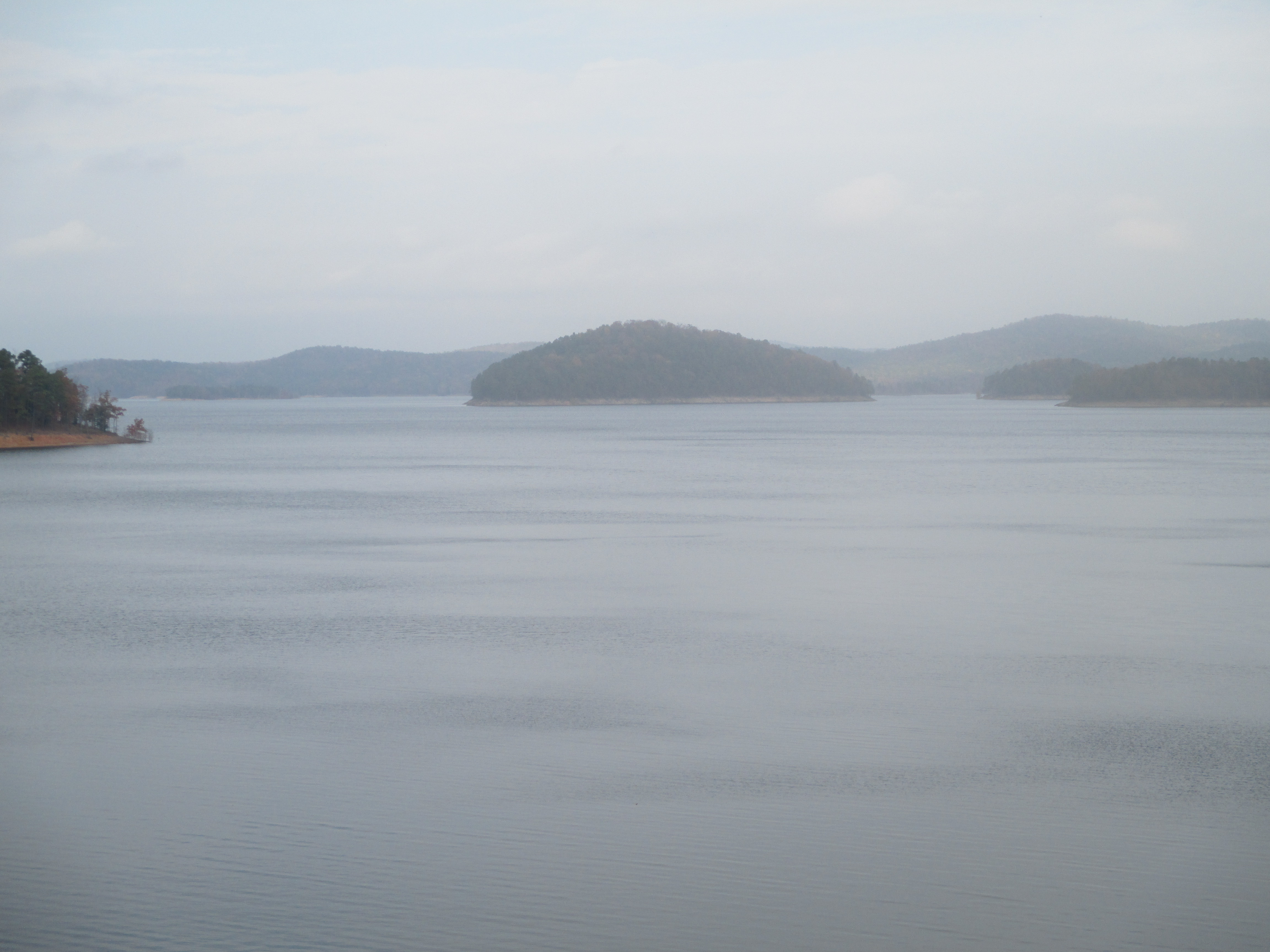
A vista of Broken Bow Lake

Beavers Bend State Park is a 3,482 acres (14.09 km^{2}) Oklahoma state park located in McCurtain County. It is approximately 10.5 miles (16.9 km) north of Broken Bow on SH-259A. It was established in 1937 and contains Broken Bow Lake.

National Public Radio reported that the park generated $1,787,731 in 2011, excluding $414,255 in revenue from Lakeview Lodge. Thus, gross earnings were around $2.3 million. The report did not list the number of visitors, but stated that this had the second highest attendance of any Oklahoma state park during the year.

== History ==
Construction on the park began in 1935, and it was named after John T. Beavers, a Choctaw settler who originally owned some of the land. Other portions of the park were purchased from the Choctaw Lumber Company. The Civilian Conservation Corps contributed significantly to the park's construction, and it received over 2,000 visitors in its first year of operation despite not being fully developed.

This park absorbed the former Hochatown State Park in 2017.

This park was 1 of 7 state parks in Oklahoma that was in the path of totality for the April 8th, 2024 total solar eclipse, with 4 minutes and 15.2 seconds of totality.

== Attractions ==
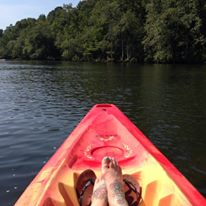
Kayaking at Broken Bow

Beavers Bend State Park offers a variety of individual and group activities. Eagle watches are available from November through February. Trout fishing, fly fishing clinics, guided horseback rides, and hayrides throughout the park are other activities offered at Beavers Bend.

A year-round naturalist and a well-stocked nature center make possible a program lineup that includes campfire programs on the banks of the Mountain Fork River, nature hikes, arts and crafts classes, water sports, bingo, sunset hikes, nature films, and astronomy outings. 14,000 acre (57 km^{2}) Broken Bow Lake is also a favorite of scuba divers. Other park diversions include golfing, miniature golf, archery, tennis, jet skiing, bumper boat rides, boating, and canoeing.

The David L. Boren Trail offers 16 miles (26 km) of hiking trails with 4 miles (6 km) of multi-purpose trails that wander along ridge tops, over creek bottoms, through tall stands of timber, and into areas so remote one can almost experience what early-day explorers must have felt upon seeing the Ouachita National Forest for the first time. The same trail can also be divided into a variety of short and long hikes for those not wishing to make the entire trek.

=== Forest Heritage Center ===
Visitors to the Forest Heritage Center's museum will find historical documents, antique forestry tools, wood art, homestead memorabilia, and a research library filled with books, periodicals, and other materials pertaining to forestry, the primary industry of the area.

The center is also home to 14 dioramas (painted by Harry Rossoll of Atlanta, Georgia, the artist who created Smokey Bear) that cover prehistoric forests, Caddo Indians, Papermaking in the South, 1940s lumbering, and forest appreciation. Each diorama is accompanied by a taped narration. In June 2003 an 8-foot (2.4 m) tall bronze sculpture was unveiled, honoring the memory of Jim Burnett and all people who risk their lives fighting wildland fires each year. Burnett was the first forest firefighter from Oklahoma to lose his life in the line of duty and one of the many firefighters dispatched by the state of Oklahoma to battle an outbreak of wildfires in Wyoming during the summer of 2000. Burnett lost his life on August 11, 2000, fighting the Kate's Basin Fire near Thermopolis, Wyoming.

Each year some 60 million cubic feet (1,700,000 m^{3}) of lumber is harvested in McCurtain County. The forest industry is the area's largest business concern, and great care is taken to ensure the prolonged health of local pine and hardwood forests.

== Geology ==
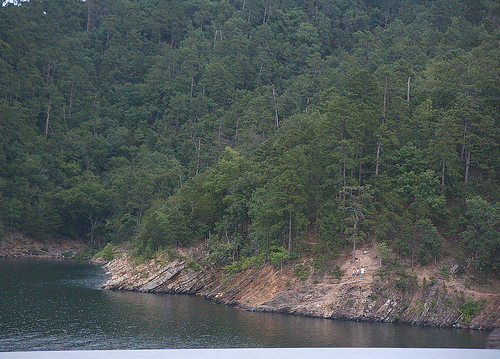
An example of the area's geology

Built on the site of an old Choctaw settlement, Beavers Bend State Park was named after John T. Beavers, a Choctaw intermarried citizen. The "bend" in the park's name refers to an area of the park where a portion of Mountain Fork River meanders sharply, making an almost 180-degree turn. This area is commonly known as the River Bend, and is a popular area for trout fishing, canoe rentals, and swimming. Also in the River Bend area is the Broken Bow Hydroelectric Plant, which generates energy from the waters of Broken Bow Lake.

The local rock formations are some of the most distinctive in the state of Oklahoma. Just north of Broken Bow, sedimentary rock has been thrust upward due to an ancient collision of the North American and South American Plates, forming what is now the Ouachita Mountains. Evidence of what is called the Ouachita orogeny can be seen all over the park, where some layers of rock can be seen tilted up at angles of about sixty-degrees. These geologic features can be easily viewed around Broken Bow Lake and Mountain Fork River, where erosion has left much of the rock exposed. The unique geology of the area inspires frequent field trips by geology students from numerous colleges and universities.

== Fees ==
To help fund a backlog of deferred maintenance and park improvements, the state implemented an entrance fee for this park and 21 others effective June 15, 2020. The fees, charged per vehicle, start at $10 per day for a single-day or $8 for residents with an Oklahoma license plate or Oklahoma tribal plate. Fees are waived for honorably discharged veterans and Oklahoma residents age 62 & older and their spouses. Passes good for three days or a week are also available; annual passes good at all 22 state parks charging fees are offered at a cost of $75 for out-of-state visitors or $60 for Oklahoma residents. The 22 parks are:

- Arrowhead Area at Lake Eufaula State Park
- Beavers Bend State Park
- Boiling Springs State Park
- Cherokee Landing State Park
- Fort Cobb State Park
- Foss State Park
- Honey Creek Area at Grand Lake State Park
- Great Plains State Park
- Great Salt Plains State Park
- Greenleaf State Park
- Keystone State Park
- Lake Eufaula State Park
- Lake Murray State Park
- Lake Texoma State Park
- Lake Thunderbird State Park
- Lake Wister State Park
- Natural Falls State Park
- Osage Hills State Park
- Robbers Cave State Park
- Sequoyah State Park
- Tenkiller State Park
- Twin Bridges Area at Grand Lake State Park
