= List of nature centers in Oklahoma =

Oklahoma Nature Centers (Hover mouse over pog to popup clickable link)

This is a list of nature centers and environmental education centers in the state of Oklahoma.

To use the sortable tables: click on the icons at the top of each column to sort that column in alphabetical order; click again for reverse alphabetical order.

Name	Location	County	Region	Summary
Beavers Bend Resort Park	Broken Bow	McCurtain	Southeast	3,482 acres, includes nature center and Forest Heritage Center, a forestry museum
Bernice State Park	Grove	Delaware	Green Country	88 acres, includes a nature center, wildlife feeding area and two wildlife watch towers
Byron State Fish Hatchery & Watchable Wildlife Area	Hulbert	Alfalfa	Northwestern Oklahoma	website, 40 acres, education programs, nature center open on a limited basis
Chickasaw National Recreation Area	Sulphur	Murray	South Central	9,899 acres, Travertine Nature Center serves as the parks main educational center with natural history dioramas, live reptiles, amphibians and birds of prey, and an interactive learning area
Greenleaf State Park	Braggs	Muskogee	Green Country	565 acres
Hackberry Flat Center		Tillman	Southwestern Oklahoma	website, education center for the 7,120-acre Hackberry Flat Wildlife Management Area, Friends of Hackberry Flat
Kerr Arboretum and Botanical Area	Talihina	Le Flore	Southeast	8,026 acres, located in Ouachita National Forest
Lake Eufaula State Park	Checotah	McIntosh	Green Country	2,853 acres, Deep Fork Nature Center
Lake Murray State Park	Ardmore	Carter	South Central	12,500 acres, Tucker Tower Nature Center
Lake Texoma State Park	Kingston	Marshall	South Central	1,882 acres, Two Rivers Nature Center
Lake Thunderbird State Park	Norman	Cleveland	Oklahoma City Metro	1,874 acres, Discovery Cove Nature Center in Clear Bay area
Lake Wister State Park	Wister	Le Flore	Southeast	3,428 acres
Martin Park Nature Center	Oklahoma City	Oklahoma	Oklahoma City Metro	website, 144 acres, operated by the City
Oxley Nature Center	Tulsa	Tulsa	Green Country	website, operated by the City in the 745-acre Mohawk Park
Quartz Mountain Nature Park	Lone Wolf	Kiowa	Southwestern Oklahoma	4,284 acres
Robbers Cave State Park	Wilburton	Latimer	Southeast	8,246 acres
Salt Plains National Wildlife Refuge	Hulbert	Alfalfa	Northwestern Oklahoma	32,080 acres, education programs, visitor center exhibits
Sequoyah State Park	Hulbert	Cherokee	Green Country	349 acres, Three Forks Nature Center
Tenkiller State Park	Vian	Sequoyah	Green Country	1,190 acres, Driftwood Nature Center
Wichita Mountains Wildlife Refuge	Indiahoma	Comanche	Southwestern Oklahoma	59,020 acres, environmental education center at Quanah Parker Lake
