= List of Oklahoma placenames of Native American origin =

This is a list of Native American place names in the U.S. state of Oklahoma. Oklahoma has a long history of Native American settlement and reservations. From 1834 to 1907, prior to Oklahoma's statehood, the territory was set aside by the US government and designated as Indian Territory, and today 6% of the population identifies as Native American. Many of the Indians who were forced to migrate during the Trail of Tears were forcibly relocated to Oklahoma.

== Lists ==
=== State ===
- Oklahoma – invented by Chief Allen Wright as a rough translation of "Indian Territory"; in Choctaw, okla means "people", "tribe", or "nation", and homa- means "red", thus: "Red people".
  - Oklahoma County
  - Oklahoma City
  - Oklahoma Lake
  - Oklahoma River

=== Counties ===
- Atoka County
  - Atoka, Oklahoma
  - Atoka Lake
  - Lake Atoka Reservoir
- Caddo County
  - Caddo, Oklahoma
- Canadian County
- Cherokee County – named after the Cherokee people.
  - Cherokee, Oklahoma
  - Cherokee State Park
  - Cherokee Landing State Park
  - Grand Lake o' the Cherokees
- Choctaw County
  - Choctaw, Oklahoma
- Comanche County
  - Comanche, Oklahoma
- Kiowa County
  - Kiowa, Oklahoma
- Muskogee County
  - Muskogee, Oklahoma
- Nowata County – Lenape – Derived from nuwita "Welcome"
  - City of Nowata
- Okfuskee County
- Okmulgee County – Creek language – "Boiling waters"
  - City of Okmulgee
  - Okmulgee Lake
  - Okmulgee State Park
- Osage County
  - Osage, Oklahoma
  - Osage Hills State Park
- Ottawa County
- Pawnee County
- Pontotoc County
- Pottawatomie County
- Pushmataha County
- Seminole County
  - Seminole, Oklahoma
- Sequoyah County
  - Sequoyah National Wildlife Refuge
  - Sequoyah State Park
  - Sequoyah Bay State Park
- Texas County
- Tulsa County – Creek language – Derived from tallasi "Old town"
  - City of Tulsa
  - New Tulsa, Oklahoma
- Washita County

=== Settlements ===
- Agawam, Oklahoma
- Ahpeatone, Oklahoma
- Anadarko – Caddo language – Derived from Nadá-kuh, means "bumblebee place."
- Apache, Oklahoma
- Arapaho, Oklahoma
- Bokchito – Choctaw language – "Big creek"
- Bokoshe – Choctaw language – "little creek"
- Camargo – Cheyenne language – "little dog"
- Catoosa – Cherokee language – phonetically pronounced "Ga-du-si" or "Ga-tu-si". Various interpretations of this word exist, including: "between two hills", "on the hill", "into the hills", and possibly signifying a prominent hill or place thereon.
- Cayuga, Oklahoma
- Chattanooga, Oklahoma
- Checotah, Oklahoma
- Cheyenne, Oklahoma
- Chickasha – Choctaw language – Chickasaw Indian tribe
- Chilocco, Oklahoma
- Coweta, Oklahoma
- Etowah, Oklahoma
- Eucha – Cherokee language – named for Principal Chief Oochalata
  - Lake Eucha
  - Lake Eucha Park
- Eufaula – Creek language – from the Eufaula tribe, part of the Muscogee Creek Confederacy
  - Eufaula Lake
- Geronimo, Oklahoma - Apache language - named for an Apache warrior
- Gotebo – Kiowa language – named for Kiowa Gotebo (Qodebohon)
- Harjo, Oklahoma
- Hitchita, Oklahoma
- Hochatown, Oklahoma
  - Hochatown State Park
- Honobia, Oklahoma
- Inola – Cherokee language – "black fox"
- Kaw City, Oklahoma
  - Kaw Lake
- Keokuk Falls, Oklahoma
- Keota – Choctaw language – "the fire gone out"
- Kinta – Choctaw language – "beaver"
- Konawa, Oklahoma – Seminole language – "string of beads"
  - Konawa Reservoir
- Kosoma, Oklahoma
- Lenapah, Oklahoma
- Manitou, Oklahoma
- Maramec, Oklahoma
- Miami, Oklahoma
  - North Miami, Oklahoma
- Minco, Oklahoma
- Nashoba, Oklahoma
- Neodesha – Osage language – Derived from ni-o-sho-de "The water is smoky with mud"
- Nescatunga, Oklahoma
- New Alluwe, Oklahoma
- Ninnekah, Oklahoma
- Nuyaka, Oklahoma – Creek language – Derived from "New York"
- Oochelata – Cherokee language – named for Principal Chief Oochalata
- Okemah – Kickapoo language – "Things up high"
- Okesa, Oklahoma
- Oktaha, Oklahoma
- Olustee – Creek language – "black water"
- Oologah – Cherokee language – "Dark Cloud"
  - Oologah Lake
- Owasso – Osage language – "End of the trail" or "turnaround"
- Pawhuska – Osage language – "White hair"
- Pawnee, Oklahoma
- Pensacola, Oklahoma
- Peoria, Oklahoma
- Pocasset, Oklahoma
- Pocola – Choctaw language – "ten"
- Ponca City, Oklahoma
- Pontotoc, Oklahoma
  - Pushmataha Wildlife Management Area
- Quapaw, Oklahoma
- Sapulpa, Oklahoma
- Sasakwa – Seminole language – "wild goose"
- Shawnee, Oklahoma
- Skedee, Oklahoma
- Skiatook, Oklahoma
  - Skiatook Lake
- Skullyville – Choctaw language – derivation from iskuli – "money"
- Tahlequah – Cherokee language – "Open place where the grass grows"
- Talala, Oklahoma
- Talihina – Choctaw language – "iron road" (railroad)
- Tamaha – Choctaw language – "town"
- Taloga – Creek language – "beautiful valley" or "rocking water"
- Tamaha, Oklahoma
- Tecumseh, Oklahoma
- Tishomingo, Oklahoma
  - Tishomingo National Wildlife Refuge
- Tonkawa, Oklahoma
- Tullahassee, Oklahoma
- Tupelo, Oklahoma
- Tushka – Choctaw language – "warrior"
- Tuskahoma – Choctaw language – "red warrior"
- Wakita, Oklahoma
- Wapanucka – Lenape language – "Eastern land people"
- Washita, Oklahoma
  - Washita National Wildlife Refuge
- Washunga, Oklahoma
- Watonga – Arapaho language – "black coyote"
- Watova, Oklahoma
- Waurika, Oklahoma
  - Waurika Lake
- Waynoka, Oklahoma
- Weleetka – Creek language – "Running water"
- Wetumka – Creek language – "Tumbling water"
- Wewoka – Seminole language – "Barking water"
- Wichita Mountains
  - Wichita Mountains Wildlife Refuge
- Wyandotte, Oklahoma
- Yahola, Oklahoma
  - Lake Yahola (Oklahoma)

=== Other ===
- Apukshunnubbee District—Named after a Choctaw warrior and statesman
- Chickasaw National Recreation Area
- Hulah Lake (Oklahoma)
- Nanih Waiya Lake
- Neosho River
- Ouachita Mountains
  - Ouachita National Forest
- Talimena State Park
  - Talimena Scenic Drive
- Wah-Sha-She State Park

== See also ==
- List of place names in the United States of Native American origin
