= List of Oklahoma state parks =

This is a list of current and former state parks in Oklahoma.

Oklahoma State Parks (Hover mouse over pog to popup clickable link)

== Current parks ==
| Park Name | County or Counties | Area in acres | Area in ha | Year Established | Water Body(s) | Remarks |
|---|---|---|---|---|---|---|
| Alabaster Caverns State Park | Woodward | 200 | 81 | 1956 | | Largest public gypsum cave in the United States |
| Arrowhead State Park | Pittsburg | 2,200 | 890 | 1963 | Lake Eufaula | On a peninsula in Lake Eufaula. Lodge and cabins are closed. Now known as Arrowhead Area at Lake Eufaula State Park. |
| Beavers Bend State Park | McCurtain | 3,482 | 1,409 | 1935 | Mountain Fork River, Broken Bow Lake | |
| Bernice State Park | Delaware | 88 | 36 | 1970 | Grand Lake o' the Cherokees | Now known as the Bernice Area at Grand Lake State Park. |
| Black Mesa State Park | Cimarron | 349 | 141 | 1959 | Lake Carl Etling | Black Mesa Nature Preserve established in 1991 by the Oklahoma Nature Conservancies |
| Boiling Springs State Park | Woodward | 820 | 330 | 1935 | | |
| Cherokee Landing State Park | Cherokee | 146 | 59 | 1954 | Lake Tenkiller | |
| Cherokee State Park | Mayes | 43 | 17 | 1954 | Grand Lake o' the Cherokees | |
| Clayton Lake State Park | Pushmataha | 510 | 210 | 1947 | Clayton Lake | |
| Disney/Little Blue State Park | Mayes | 32 | 13 | 1966 | Grand Lake | |
| Fort Cobb State Park | Caddo | 1,872 | 758 | 1960 | Fort Cobb | |
| Foss State Park | Washita | 1,749 | 708 | 1961 | Foss Lake | |
| Gloss Mountain State Park | Major | 640 | 260 | 1977 | | |
| Great Plains State Park | Kiowa | 187 | 76 | 1977 | Tom Steed Reservoir | |
| Great Salt Plains State Park | Alfalfa | 840 | 340 | 1952 | Great Salt Plains Lake | |
| Greenleaf State Park | Muskogee | 565 | 229 | 1954 | Greenleaf Lake | |
| Honey Creek State Park | Delaware | 30 | 12 | 1954 | Grand Lake | Now known as the Honey Creek Area at Grand Lake State Park. |
| Keystone State Park | Tulsa | 714 | 289 | 1966 | Keystone Lake | |
| Lake Eufaula State Park | McIntosh | 2,853 | 1,155 | 1963 | Lake Eufaula | |
| Lake Murray State Park | Carter, Love | 12,496 | 5,057 | 1938 | Lake Murray | Added to National Register of Historic Places in 2001. |
| Lake Texoma State Park | Marshall | 1,882 | 762 | 1951 | Lake Texoma | |
| Lake Thunderbird State Park | Cleveland | 1,874 | 758 | 1965 | Lake Thunderbird | |
| Lake Wister State Park | Le Flore | 3,428 | 1,387 | 1953 | Lake Wister | |
| Little Sahara State Park | Woods | 1,600 | 650 | 1959 | | |
| McGee Creek State Park | Atoka | 2,600 | 1,100 | | McGee Creek Reservoir | |
| Natural Falls State Park | Delaware | 120 | 49 | 1990 | | |
| Osage Hills State Park | Osage | 1,100 | 450 | 1935 | | |
| Quartz Mountain State Park | Greer | 4,284 | 1,734 | 1935 | Lake Altus | |
| Raymond Gary State Park | Choctaw | 263 | 106 | 1955 | Raymond Gary Lake | |
| Robbers Cave State Park | Latimer | 8,246 | 3,337 | 1935 | Fourche Maline, Lake Carlton, Lake Wayne Wallace | |
| Roman Nose State Park | Blaine | | | 1937 | Lake Watonga, Lake Boecher | |
| Sequoyah Bay State Park | Wagoner | 303 | 123 | 1954 | Fort Gibson Lake | |
| Sequoyah State Park | Cherokee | 2,200 | 890 | 1953 | Fort Gibson Lake | Park formerly known as Western Hills State Park |
| Spavinaw State Park | Mayes | 35 | 14 | 1959 | Spavinaw Lake | Now known as the Spavinaw Area at Grand Lake State Park. |
| Talimena State Park | Le Flore | 20 | 8.1 | 1970 | | |
| Tenkiller State Park | Sequoyah | 1,190 | 480 | 1953 | Lake Tenkiller | |
| Twin Bridges State Park | Ottawa | 63 | 25 | 1954 | Neosho River, Spring River | Now known as the Twin Bridges Area at Grand Lake State Park. |

== Former state parks ==
| Park Name | County or Counties | Area in acres | Date founded | Stream(s) and / or Lake(s) | Notes |
|---|---|---|---|---|---|
| Adair Park (Stilwell, Oklahoma) | Adair | 25 | | | Small park within the city limits of Stilwell. Now owned by the City of Stilwell. |
| Beaver Dunes Park | Beaver | 520 | | | Owned by City of Beaver. |
| Boggy Depot Park | Atoka | 630 | | | Owned and managed by the Chickasaw Nation since 2011. |
| Brushy Lake Park | Sequoyah | 90 | 1971 | Brushy Lake | Since 2011, owned and managed by the City of Sallisaw, Oklahoma |
| Crowder Lake University Park | Washita | 22 | | Crowder Lake | Owned and operated since 2003 by Southwestern Oklahoma State University. Lake surface is 158 acres. |
| Dripping Springs Park | Okmulgee | 1,075 | | Dripping Springs Lake | The former Dripping Springs State Park; operated by the City of Okmulgee since 2015. |
| Heavener Runestone Park | Le Flore | 50 | 1970 | | Owned and managed by city of Heavener since 2011. |
| Hochatown State Park | McCurtain | 1,713 | 1966 | Broken Bow Lake | Combined into Beavers Bend, no longer a separate park |
| Hugo Lake State Park | Choctaw | 289 | 1974 | Hugo Lake | Originally built in 1974 as Kiamichi Park, renamed Hugo Lake State Park in 2002. |
| Lake Eucha Park | Delaware | 55 | 1967 | Lake Eucha | The former Lake Eucha State Park; owned and managed by the city of Tulsa since 2011; Park is not actually on Lake Eucha |
| Okmulgee Park | Okmulgee | 1,075 | 1963 | Okmulgee Lake | The former Okmulgee State Park; owned and managed by the City of Okmulgee since 2015 |
| Red Rock Canyon Park | Caddo | 310 | 1956 | | Leased to the City of Hinton, Oklahoma in 2018. |
| Snowdale State Park | Mayes | 15 | 1959 | Lake Hudson (Oklahoma) | Snowdale became the Snowdale Area at Grand Lake State Park. The Oklahoma Department of Tourism and Recreation chose not to renew its lease from the Grand River Dam Authority in 2019, shutting down the park. |
| Walnut Creek State Park | Osage | 1,429 | 1966 | Keystone Lake | Park was permanently closed October 1, 2014 |
| Wah-Sha-She Park | Osage | 266 | 1973 | Lake Hulah | Formerly Wah-Sha-She State Park. Leased to the Osage Nation since 2011 by the US Corps of Engineers; subleased since 2015 to the non-profit Hulah Lake Osage Association which maintains the park through volunteer efforts and campground fees. |
