= Greenleaf State Park =

State park in Oklahoma, United States

- Location within Oklahoma
- Location: Muskogee County, Oklahoma, United States
- Nearest city: Braggs, OK
- Coordinates: 35°37′27″N 95°10′13″W
- Area: 565 acres (229 ha)
- Established: 1939
- Visitors: 181,592 (in 2021)
- Governing body: Oklahoma Tourism and Recreation Department
- Website: www.travelok.com/listings/view.profile/id.3236

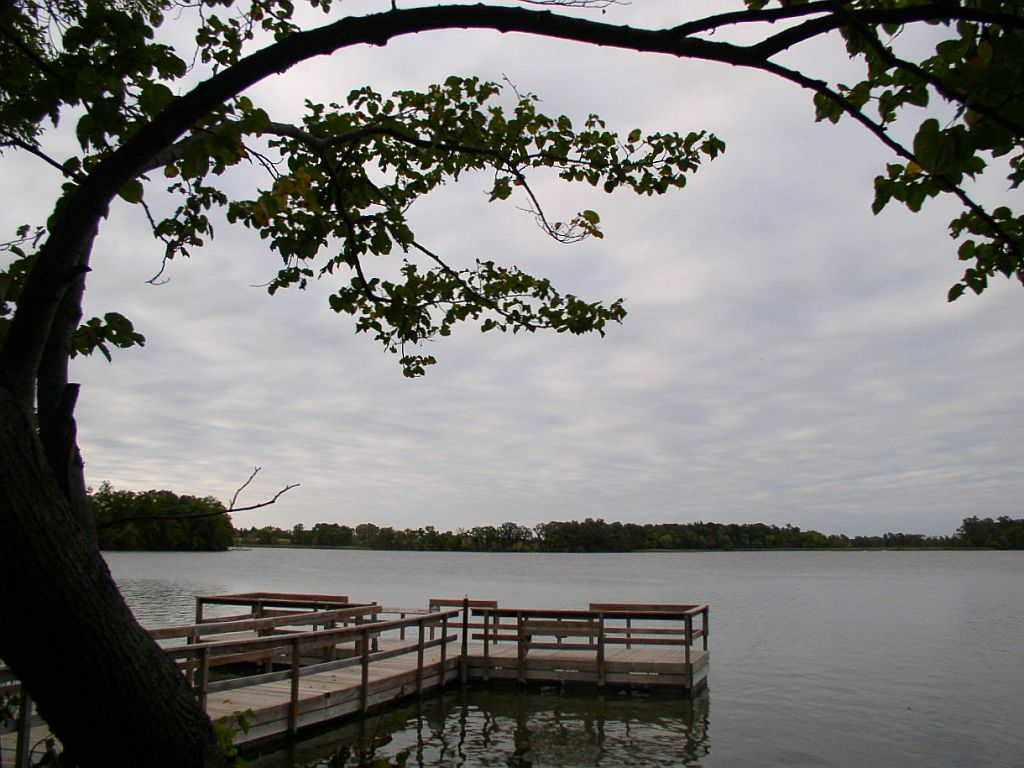

Greenleaf State Park is located near Braggs, Oklahoma, and is situated around the 930-acre (3.8 km^{2}) Greenleaf Lake. Greenleaf Lake was built in 1939. There is an 18-mile (29 km) hiking trail that begins inside the park and makes its way around Greenleaf lake and into the adjacent government land of Camp Gruber.

Greenleaf State Park is one of Oklahoma's original seven parks and one of its most scenic and family-oriented. The park includes Lake Greenleaf as well as cabins, campgrounds, family recreation facilities and nature hiking trails.

== Greenleaf Lake ==
According to Caneday et al., the normal elevation of Greenleaf Lake is 510 feet (160 m) above sealevel, and the surface area is 920 acres (3.7 km^{2}). The capacity is rated at 14,720 acre-feet (18,160,000 m^{3}). The shoreline is 14 miles (23 km).

== Park Accommodations ==
=== Cabins ===
The lake cabins and other facilities at Greenleaf State Park were built in the 1930s by the CCC, WPA and German prisoners-of-war (POWs). The original buildings were built with native stone. Originally, the park had 14 one-bedroom cabins approximately 350 sq ft (33 m^{2}) in size that included bathrooms, kitchens, heating and air-conditioning, dishes, linens, and satellite TV. Some cabins included a fireplace.

Added in 1994, Cabin 15, or "Cabin on the Lake" was designed to meet the challenges of campers with physical disabilities. Donated by Telephone Pioneers of America, a national organization of active and retired Southwestern Bell employees, the $90,000 campsite was, at that time, one of three handicap accessible cabins in the nation.

=== Campground ===
The park features recreational vehicle (RV) campgrounds, with a total of 158 campsites, classified as "Full Modern (21), Semi-modern (79) and Primitive tent sites. The principal differences are that 8 Modern sites have 50-amp electric service hookups and 13 Modern sites have 20-amp hookups. Semi-modern sites include 17 50-amp hookups and 62 30-amp hookups. The Primitive tent campsites have no electric or water hookups. All of these sites share use of a community building, pavilion, enclosed shelter, outdoor shelter, seasonal fast food grill, 18-hole miniature golf course and laundry center. Guests will also enjoy the splash pad, mini golf course, swim beach, heated fishing dock, amphitheater, nature center, playgrounds, hiking trails, horseshoes, volleyball courts and basketball courts.

=== Activities ===
The park naturalist offers astronomy programs, campfire programs, party barge tours of Greenleaf Lake and hay wagon rides, as well as arts and crafts, storytelling, nature hikes and more. No jet skis or wave runners are allowed on Greenleaf Lake. The kids' pond allows children 16 and under to fish at no charge with no permit required. The park also offers activities such as wildlife viewing, holiday events and boating on Greenleaf Lake.

== Fees ==
To help fund a backlog of deferred maintenance and park improvements, the state implemented an entrance fee for this park and 21 others effective June 15, 2020. The fees, charged per vehicle, start at $10 per day for a single-day or $8 for residents with an Oklahoma license plate or Oklahoma tribal plate. Fees are waived for honorably discharged veterans and Oklahoma residents age 62 & older and their spouses. Passes good for three days or a week are also available; annual passes good at all 22 state parks charging fees are offered at a cost of $75 for out-of-state visitors or $60 for Oklahoma residents. The 22 parks are:

- Arrowhead Area at Lake Eufaula State Park
- Beavers Bend State Park
- Boiling Springs State Park
- Cherokee Landing State Park
- Fort Cobb State Park
- Foss State Park
- Honey Creek Area at Grand Lake State Park
- Great Plains State Park
- Great Salt Plains State Park
- Greenleaf State Park
- Keystone State Park
- Lake Eufaula State Park
- Lake Murray State Park
- Lake Texoma State Park
- Lake Thunderbird State Park
- Lake Wister State Park
- Natural Falls State Park
- Osage Hills State Park
- Robbers Cave State Park
- Sequoyah State Park
- Tenkiller State Park
- Twin Bridges Area at Grand Lake State Park

== See also ==
- Greenleaf State Park Resource Management Plan. Caneday, Lowell; Liu, Hung Ling (Stella); Wu, I-Chun (Nicky); Tapps, Tyler. Oklahoma State University. June 30, 2014. Accessed November 23, 2019.
