= Clayton Lake =

Reservoir in Oklahoma, United States

- Location within Oklahoma Location within the United States
- Location: Pushmataha County, Oklahoma
- Coordinates: 34°32′35″N 95°18′34″W
- Type: Reservoir
- Primary inflows: Peal Creek
- Basin countries: United States
- First flooded: 1935
- Surface area: 66 acres (0.27 km^{2})
- Water volume: 953 acre-feet (1,176,000 m^{3})
- Shore length^{1}: 2 miles (3.2 km)
- Surface elevation: 665 feet (203 m)
- Settlements: Clayton, Oklahoma
- ^{1} Shore length is not a well-defined measure.

Clayton Lake is a small recreational lake in Pushmataha County, Oklahoma. It is located 5 miles (8.0 km) south of Clayton, Oklahoma.

The lake, which was built in 1935, impounds the waters of Peal Creek. It is operated as Clayton Lake State Park by the State of Oklahoma. The state park offers rental cabins, tent and RV campsites, picnic tables and shelters, comfort stations with showers, boat ramps, ADA accessible fishing dock, playground, hiking trails and swim beach. It is a popular fishing and camping spot due to its scenic location nestled among the Kiamichi Mountains, surrounded by pine tree forests.

Clayton Lake comprises 66 acres (270,000 m^{2}) of area and 2 miles (3.2 km) of shoreline. Normal pool elevation is 665 feet (203 m) above sea level. Its normal holding capacity is 953 acre-feet (1,176,000 m^{3}).

== See also ==
- List of lakes of Oklahoma
