= Brushy Lake Park =

- Location within Oklahoma
- Location: Sequoyah County, Oklahoma, United States
- Nearest city: Sallisaw, OK
- Coordinates: 35.542222°N 94.817778°W
- Area: 90 acres (36 ha)
- Governing body: City of Sallisaw
- Website: www.travelok.com/listings/view.profile/id.879

Brushy Lake Park is a protected area in Sequoyah County, Oklahoma, run by and 8 miles (13 km) north of the city of Sallisaw. Formerly an Oklahoma state park, the 90-acre site (36 ha) is located in the wooded Cookson Hills of eastern Oklahoma beside the 300 acres (120 ha) Brushy Lake. The quiet, secluded recreation destination has camping, picnic areas, fishing and boating. Facilities include day-use picnic areas with tables and grills, group shelters with electricity, 23 concrete camping sites including RV sites, playgrounds and a lighted boat ramp, as well as boat and fishing docks. Electric service, water service and comfort stations with showers are all available.

After being proposed for closure in 2011, management and ownership of the park were transferred to the city of Sallisaw.

An interview with park manager Mike Hancock in 2014 indicates that the park's situation has improved since the responsibility was handed to the city. He noted that the RV and camping spaces were staying full because the city was better able to fund maintenance that had previously been deferred by the state.
