= Bernice, Oklahoma =

- Town
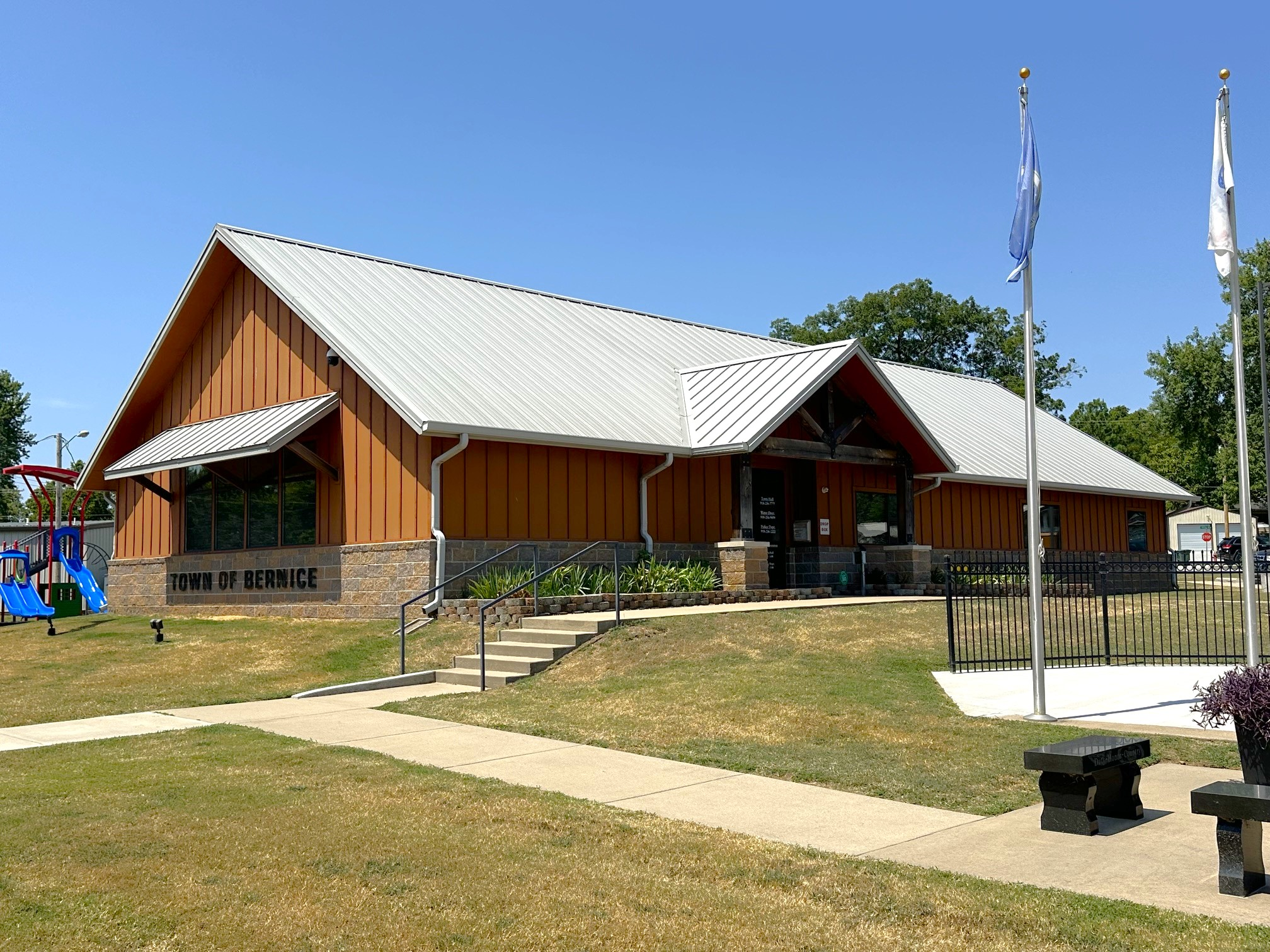
- Bernice Town Hall in August, 2026
- Motto: "Crappie fishing capital of the world"
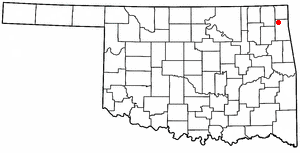
- Location of Bernice, Oklahoma
- Coordinates: 36°37′34″N 94°54′39″W
- Country: United States
- State: Oklahoma
- County: Delaware

Area
  - Total: 1.41 sq mi (3.64 km^{2})
  - Land: 0.81 sq mi (2.11 km^{2})
  - Water: 0.59 sq mi (1.53 km^{2})
- Elevation: 748 ft (228 m)

Population (2020)
  - Total: 422
  - Density: 517.4/sq mi (199.77/km^{2})
- Time zone: UTC-6 (Central (CST))
  - Summer (DST): UTC-5 (CDT)
- FIPS code: 40-05550
- GNIS feature ID: 2411679

Bernice is a town in Delaware County, Oklahoma, United States. As of the 2020 census, Bernice had a population of 422. Located on Grand Lake o' the Cherokees, the town is now primarily a vacation and retirement area. It claims to be the "Crappie Fishing Capital of the World."

== History ==
Bernice was founded in 1912, after Rose Mode and his partner, Charles Lee, bought 60 acres (24 ha) of land in the Horse Creek Basin of northwestern Delaware County. The town was named for Mode's daughter, Bernice. A post office was established on February 12, 1913, and the town soon became a local agricultural center. By 1918, Bernice had an estimated population of nearly 400 people. Businesses included a bank, a milliner, a grain elevator, a sawmill, a hotel, a flour mill, and three general stores. The population declined after World War I and the Great Depression from 198 in 1920 to 162 in 1930, and 91 in 1940. After World War II, population growth rebounded to 318 in 1980.

Construction of the Pensacola Dam put the original town in a flood plain, so the residents moved to high ground outside the proposed lake.

At present, the town serves as a vacation spot for many residents of surrounding communities. Indian Hills Resort, the oldest recreational business in the town, was established in 1940. Bernice State Park, approximately one-half mile east of town, across the Neosho River, also attracts vacationers.

== Geography ==
Bernice is located along the west bank of Horse Creek.

According to the United States Census Bureau, the town has a total area of 1.5 square miles (3.9 km^{2}), of which 0.9 square miles (2.3 km^{2}) is land and 0.6 square miles (1.6 km^{2}) (38.62%) is water.

== Demographics ==
Historical population
Census	Pop.	Note	%±
1920	198		—
1930	162		−18.2%
1940	205		26.5%
1950	91		−55.6%
1960	100		9.9%
1970	189		89.0%
1980	318		68.3%
1990	330		3.8%
2000	504		52.7%
2010	562		11.5%
2020	422		−24.9%
U.S. Decennial Census

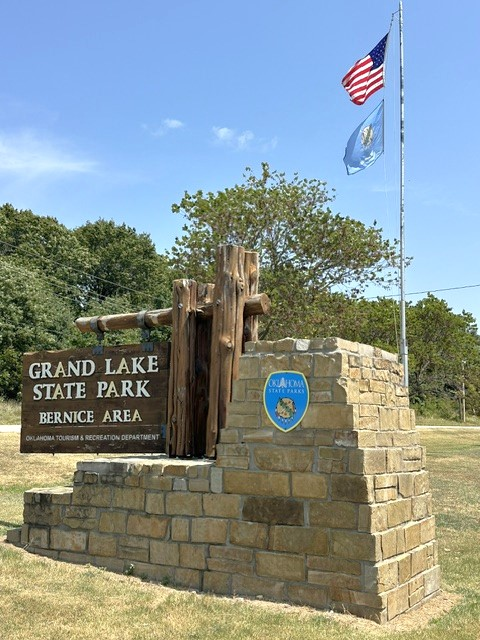
Signage at Bernice Area of Grand Lake State Park in August of 2026

=== 2020 census ===
As of the 2020 census, Bernice had a population of 422. The median age was 57.7 years. 14.7% of residents were under the age of 18 and 33.9% of residents were 65 years of age or older. For every 100 females there were 101.0 males, and for every 100 females age 18 and over there were 102.2 males age 18 and over.

0.0% of residents lived in urban areas, while 100.0% lived in rural areas.

There were 211 households in Bernice, of which 19.9% had children under the age of 18 living in them. Of all households, 39.3% were married-couple households, 25.1% were households with a male householder and no spouse or partner present, and 25.6% were households with a female householder and no spouse or partner present. About 33.7% of all households were made up of individuals and 15.7% had someone living alone who was 65 years of age or older.

There were 353 housing units, of which 40.2% were vacant. The homeowner vacancy rate was 3.2% and the rental vacancy rate was 5.0%.

Racial composition as of the 2020 census
Race	Number	Percent
White	315	74.6%
Black or African American	1	0.2%
American Indian and Alaska Native	55	13.0%
Asian	0	0.0%
Native Hawaiian and Other Pacific Islander	1	0.2%
Some other race	4	0.9%
Two or more races	46	10.9%
Hispanic or Latino (of any race)	12	2.8%

=== 2000 census ===
As of the census of 2000, there were 504 people, 245 households, and 152 families residing in the town. The population density was 565.0 inhabitants per square mile (218.1/km^{2}). There were 385 housing units at an average density of 431.6 per square mile (166.6/km^{2}). The racial makeup of the town was 81.35% White, 12.90% Native American, and 5.75% from two or more races. Hispanic or Latino of any race were 1.19% of the population.

There were 245 households, out of which 20.0% had children under the age of 18 living with them, 55.5% were married couples living together, 3.3% had a female householder with no husband present, and 37.6% were non-families. 35.5% of all households were made up of individuals, and 15.5% had someone living alone who was 65 years of age or older. The average household size was 2.06 and the average family size was 2.59.

In the town, the population was spread out, with 16.7% under the age of 18, 6.3% from 18 to 24, 20.8% from 25 to 44, 31.3% from 45 to 64, and 24.8% who were 65 years of age or older. The median age was 51 years. For every 100 females, there were 104.9 males. For every 100 females age 18 and over, there were 102.9 males.

The median income for a household in the town was $24,844, and the median income for a family was $30,288. Males had a median income of $24,444 versus $15,833 for females. The per capita income for the town was $15,005. About 9.5% of families and 14.1% of the population were below the poverty line, including 24.4% of those under age 18 and 13.2% of those age 65 or over.

== Education ==
Most of Bernice is zoned to Cleora Public School while a section to the north is in Afton Public Schools.
