= Lake Thunderbird =

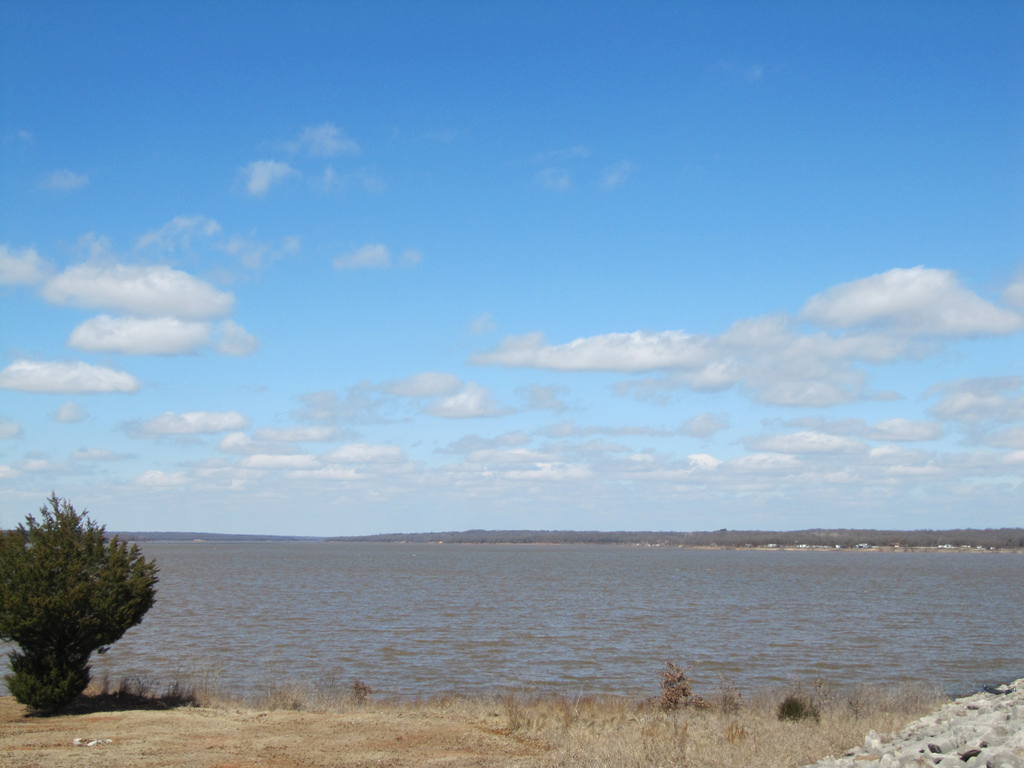
- Lake Thunderbird

- Location within Oklahoma Location within the United States
- Location: Norman, Oklahoma
- Coordinates: 35.220833°N 97.218056°W
- Type: reservoir
- Primary inflows: Little River
- Primary outflows: Little River
- Catchment area: 163,840 acres (663.0 km^{2})
- Basin countries: United States
- Surface area: 5,349 acres (8.358 mi^{2}; 21.65 km^{2})
- Water volume: 105,838 acre-feet (130,549,000 m^{3})
- Surface elevation: 1,039 ft (317 m)

Lake Thunderbird is a reservoir located in Norman, Oklahoma. The lake was constructed between 1962 and 1965 for the purpose of providing municipal water to the nearby communities of Del City, Midwest City and Norman. It is formed by an earthfill embankment (dam) 7,300 feet (2,200 m) long and up to 144 feet (44 m) high on the Little River.

In addition to being a source for drinking water, Lake Thunderbird's secondary uses include numerous recreational activities, which fall under the jurisdiction of Lake Thunderbird State Park.

The lake is named for the Native American legend of the Thunderbird, a supernatural bird of power and strength. Many locals commonly refer to the lake as "Lake Dirtybird" due to the very murky lake water.

According to local legend, the reservoir is home to a giant cephalopod cryptid called the Oklahoma Octopus.

== Reservoir ==
=== Norman Dam ===
The Little River valley was the subject of several Army United States Army Corps of Engineers studies in 1936 and 1947 for flood control. In 1953 the issue of water supply was raised among a council of local governments consisting of Norman, Midwest City, Del City, Moore and Tinker Air Force Base, and it was forecast that by the 1970s and 1980s the cities would be requiring all available water to meet municipal demand. A feasibility study in 1954 led to a plan report in May 1961, and construction began on Norman Dam in 1962.

Oklahoma State Highway 9 was re-routed in 1963 from present-day Alameda Street to its current location, south of the lake. The dam and lake were completed in 1965 by the United States Bureau of Reclamation. The earthen dam has a height of 144 feet and impounds 171,400 acre-feet of water. The Bureau owns the dam, which is operated by the local Central Oklahoma Master Conservancy District.

=== Reservoir details ===
The water temperature of the lake ranges from about 86 °F (30 °C) during the summer months to under 40 °F (4 °C) during the winter months. In the summer, at a depth of 30 feet (9.1 m), the water temperature is about 10 °F (5.6 °C) cooler than at the surface. Surface water temperature is usually about 60 °F (16 °C) during spring and fall months.

As of 2001, the lakes' standard surface level was at 1,039 ft (317 m) above sea level, the maximum depth of the lake was 58 ft (18 m), with an average depth of 15.4 ft (4.7 m). The top of the Lake Thunderbird Dam was (and is) 1,071 ft (326 m) above sea level, 32 ft (9.8 m) above the standard level of the lake. The lakes' surface area was 5,349 acres (21.65 km^{2}). The volume of the reservoir (at this standard depth) was 105,838 acre-feet (130,549,000 m^{3}). The total watershed area feeding the lake is 163,840 acres (663.0 km^{2}). The rate at which sediment was accumulating in the lake is 393 acre-feet (485,000 m^{3}) a year. The reservoir had lost a total of 13,762 acre-feet (16,975,000 m^{3}) of capacity since its completion in 1965. The shoreline length was 60 miles (97 km). The capacity of the reservoir, the maximum depth, and the average depth had all decreased since 1965. The following table gives original statistics for the reservoir from 1965.

Full reservoir capacity	Standard capacity	Minimum capacity
196,260 acre-feet (242,080,000 m^{3})	119,600 acre-feet (147,500,000 m^{3})	13,640 acre-feet (16,820,000 m^{3})
Maximum depth 68 feet (21 m)	Maximum depth 58 feet (18 m)	Maximum depth 29 feet (8.8 m)
Surface elevation 1,049 feet (320 m) above sea level	Surface elevation 1,039 feet (317 m) above sea level	Surface elevation 1,010 feet (310 m) above sea level

== Lake Thunderbird State Park ==
The 6,000 acre (24 km^{2}) lake is the centerpiece of Lake Thunderbird State Park. In addition to boating, fishing, and swimming, the park offers a variety of land-based activities. These include camping, hunting, horse rental and boarding, equestrian trails, hiking, mountain biking, bird watching, nature trails, a nature center, and an archery range.
