= Hulah Lake (Oklahoma) =

Man-made reservoir in Oklahoma, United States

- Location within Oklahoma Location within the United States
- Location: Osage County, Oklahoma
- Coordinates: 36°56′06″N 96°05′30″W
- Type: reservoir
- Primary inflows: Caney River
- Surface area: 3,570 acres (1,440 ha)
- Water volume: 289,000 acre-feet (356,000,000 m^{3})
- Surface elevation: 733 feet (223 m)

Map of Hulah Lake and Wildlife Management Area

Hulah Lake is a man-made reservoir that was created by the United States Army Corps of Engineers damming the Caney River in northeastern Osage County, Oklahoma, within the Osage Indian Reservation. Hulah is an Osage word meaning "eagle”, and was the name of the farming community that was located in the valley before the construction of the dam. The primary purpose of the lake is flood control. It has become a popular recreation area. According to the U. S. Army Corps of Engineers, the Hulah Lake project includes a public hunting area, bringing the total project area to 21,510 acres (8,700 ha).

The dam is gravity type with an earthen core on a rock foundation. It is 94 feet (29 m) high and 5,200 feet (1,600 m) long. Its maximum discharge capacity is 266,000 cubic feet (7,500 m^{3}). Construction was completed in 1961. The dam was completed in February 1951.

Hulah Lake drains an area of 732 square miles (1,900 km^{2}). The lake has a storage capacity of 289,000 acre-feet (356,000,000 m^{3}), a normal surface area of 3,570 acres (1,440 ha) and a shoreline of 62 miles (100 km). The normal elevation is 733 feet (223 m) at the top of the conservation pool and 765 feet (233 m) at the top of the flood control pool. The normal storage is 3116 acre-ft.

== See also ==
- Wah-Sha-She State Park
