= Arrowhead State Park =

State park in Oklahoma, United States

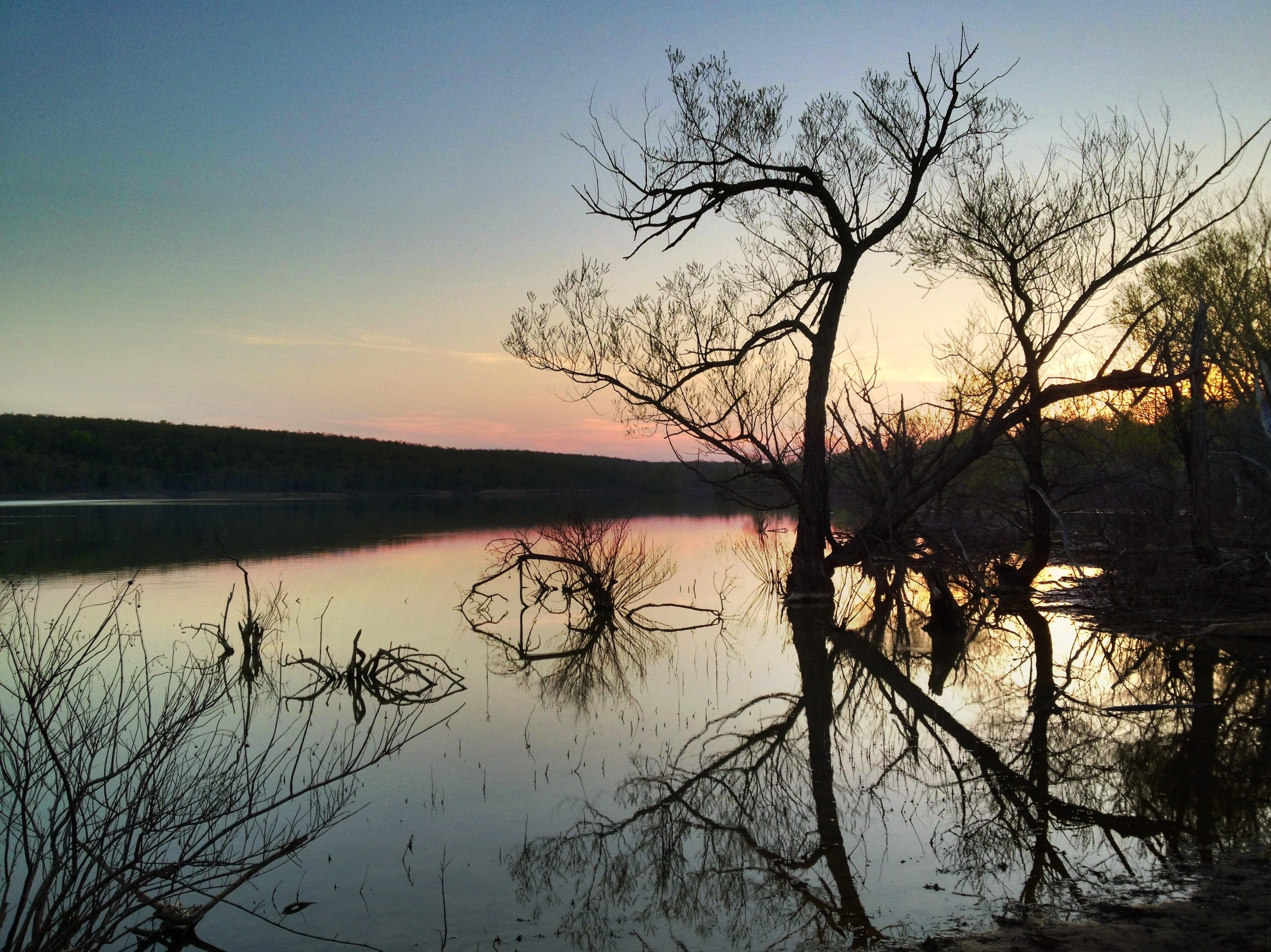
- Sunset at Arrowhead State Park, April 2014

- Location within Oklahoma
- Location: Pittsburg County, Oklahoma, United States
- Nearest city: Canadian, OK
- Coordinates: 35.1639867°N 95.6263756°W
- Area: 2,200 acres (890 ha)
- Visitors: 192,813 (in 2021)
- Governing body: Oklahoma Department of Tourism and Recreation
- Website: www.travelok.com/listings/view.profile/id.293

The former Arrowhead State Park, now known as the Arrowhead Area at Lake Eufaula State Park is a 2,200-acre (8.9 km^{2}) Oklahoma state park area located in northern Pittsburg County, Oklahoma on a peninsula of Eufaula Lake. It is located near the city of Canadian, Oklahoma. Eufaula is one of the largest man-made lakes in the southwest. Arrowhead State Park features 100 tent sites and 91 total RV sites. The park also offers picnic shelters, a marina, playgrounds, trails, miniature golf course, swimming area, mountain biking, equestrian campground, stables, and 25 miles (40 km) of equestrian trails. Group camps with a kitchen and bunkhouses are available and can sleep up to 144 people. Area 51 Marina, which also offers a restaurant, is also located at the park in the Echo Ridge area.

Arrowhead State Park Golf Course is an 18-hole, par 72 course adjacent to Eufaula Lake. Originally part of the Arrowhead Lodge resort, the course was retained by the state when it sold the now-defunct lodge to the Federal government in 1983. It has well-maintained bent grass greens, Bermuda grass tees and fairways, sand bunkers and few water hazards. Related facilities are a putting green, pro shop and a driving range. The pro shop has carts and clubs available for rent, and also offers snacks and drinks. The course is open every day except Christmas, 7 A.M. to 7 P. M.

The park is 18 miles (29 km) north of McAlester, Oklahoma on U.S. Highway 69, then 4 miles (6.4 km) east on State Park Road.

== Fees ==
To help fund a backlog of deferred maintenance and park improvements, the state implemented an entrance fee for this park and 21 others effective June 15, 2020. The fees, charged per vehicle, start at $10 per day for a single-day or $8 for residents with an Oklahoma license plate or Oklahoma tribal plate. Fees are waived for honorably discharged veterans and Oklahoma residents age 62 & older and their spouses. Passes good for three days or a week are also available; annual passes good at all 22 state parks charging fees are offered at a cost of $75 for out-of-state visitors or $60 for Oklahoma residents. The 22 parks are:

- Arrowhead Area at Lake Eufaula State Park
- Beavers Bend State Park
- Boiling Springs State Park
- Cherokee Landing State Park
- Fort Cobb State Park
- Foss State Park
- Honey Creek Area at Grand Lake State Park
- Great Plains State Park
- Great Salt Plains State Park
- Greenleaf State Park
- Keystone State Park
- Lake Eufaula State Park
- Lake Murray State Park
- Lake Texoma State Park
- Lake Thunderbird State Park
- Lake Wister State Park
- Natural Falls State Park
- Osage Hills State Park
- Robbers Cave State Park
- Sequoyah State Park
- Tenkiller State Park
- Twin Bridges Area at Grand Lake State Park

== Narconon (Arrowhead Lodge) ==
At its opening, the park was home to a resort hotel, Arrowhead Lodge. The lodge was one of two lodges built in 1965 by the state on Eufaula Lake, the other being Fountainhead Lodge in present-day Lake Eufaula State Park. Initially operated by the state, financial losses led to the transfer of Arrowhead Lodge to the federal government in 1983 along with Fountainhead Lodge. The lodge was next sold to the Choctaw Nation in 1985, who operated a gaming hotel in the premises. In 2000, Arrowhead Lodge was sold to the Association for Better Living and Education (ABLE) for use by Narconon as the new site for the Narconon inpatient drug treatment center then located near Newkirk, Oklahoma. The sale aroused controversy among local residents due to concerns about security and about the affiliation of ABLE and Narconon with the Church of Scientology. The privately operated Narconon facility, now known as Narconon Arrowhead, is surrounded by the state park.
