= Kate's Basin Fire =

2000 wildfire in Wyoming

Coordinates: 43°27′N 108°21′W

The Kate's Basin Fire was a wildfire complex which began burning southwest of Thermopolis and north of Riverton in Hot Springs County, Wyoming. The fire complex started as the Kate's Basin and Blondie #2 fires on August 7, 2000 and by August 18, it had burned over 137,600 acres (556.8 km^{2}). The fire started as a result of lightning.

During the fighting of the fire a burn over incident resulted in the death of James (Jim) Burnett of Hatfield, Arkansas, the Engine Boss of Oklahoma Engine #2.
