= Talimena State Park =

State park in Oklahoma, United States

- Location within Oklahoma
- Location: Le Flore County, Oklahoma, United States
- Nearest city: Talihina, OK
- Coordinates: 34°47′03″N 94°57′13″W
- Area: 20 acres (8.1 ha)
- Visitors: 22,546 (in 2021)
- Governing body: Oklahoma Tourism and Recreation Department
- Website: www.travelok.com/listings/view.profile/id.7645

Talimena State Park is an Oklahoma state park located in LeFlore County in eastern Oklahoma. The 20 acres (8.1 ha) park is at the Oklahoma entrance to Talimena Scenic Drive, about 7 miles (11 km) north of Talihina, Oklahoma. and 20 miles (32 km) south of Wister. It offers opportunities for camping, hiking, biking, and wildlife watching.

The park is the western end of the Ouachita National Recreation Trail, which travels 223 miles (359 km) through the Ouachita Mountains from Talimena State Park to Pinnacle Mountain State Park, just west of Little Rock, Arkansas.

In 2010, this park entertained about 7,600 visitors and earned $28,400 from activity fees. The operating cost was $11,800. It was called one of the five least expensive Oklahoma state parks. Despite threat of closure for budgetary reasons in 2018, Talimena State Park remains open in 2022.

The park is 1 of 7 Oklahoma State Parks that are in the path of totality for the 2024 solar eclipse, with 1 minute and 37 seconds of totality.
