= Brushy Lake (Sallisaw, Oklahoma) =

Reservoir in Sallisaw, Oklahoma, United States

Brushy Creek Reservoir
- Brushy Creek Reservoir
- Location within Oklahoma Location within the United States
- Coordinates: 35°32′35″N 94°49′18″W
- Primary inflows: Brushy Creek
- Primary outflows: Brushy Creek
- Basin countries: United States
- Managing agency: USDA Soil Conservation Service
- Built: 1963
- Surface area: 358 acres (145 ha)
- Water volume: 3,258 acre⋅ft (4,019,000 m^{3})
- Surface elevation: 906 ft (276 m)
- Settlements: Sallisaw, Oklahoma

Brushy Creek Reservoir, commonly known as Brushy Lake, is a reservoir located eight miles northeast of Sallisaw, Oklahoma, on a tributary of Sallisaw Creek. Brushy Lake Park is located around the reservoir. Formerly within Brushy Lake State Park, the area is now operated by the city of Sallisaw.

== General description ==
The lake was constructed in 1963 by the USDA Soil Conservation Service for flood control and a municipal water supply for Sallisaw. The total drainage area above the lake is 13,256 acres (5,365 ha). Water is pumped to the Sallisaw water treatment facilities via a 16-inch transmission line approximately six miles (9.7 km) in length.

The lake covers 358 acres (145 ha) with a volume of 3,258 acre-feet (4,019,000 m^{3}). The shoreline is 4 miles (6.4 km) long. The lake elevation is 906 feet (276 m).

The City of Sallisaw completed a new water treatment plant in 2007, and retired two older, smaller plants. The new system is rated for a capacity of 6×10^{6} US gallons (2.3×10^{4} m^{3}) per day. The project also including a new intake structure and pumping station.

== Park amenities ==
The park has camping sites with electrical hookups, restrooms for campers using tents, a boat ramp and dock.
