= Honey Creek State Park =

State park in Oklahoma, United States

- Location within Oklahoma Location within the United States
- Location: Delaware County, Oklahoma
- Nearest city: Grove, Oklahoma
- Coordinates: 36°34′32″N 94°47′02″W
- Area: 30 acres (12 ha)
- Visitors: 120,354 (in 2021)
- Governing body: Oklahoma Department of Tourism and Recreation
- Website: Official website

The Honey Creek Area at Grand Lake State Park, previously Honey Creek State Park, is a 30-acre (120,000 m^{2}) Oklahoma state park located on Grand Lake, near the city of Grove, Oklahoma in Delaware County, Oklahoma.

Honey Creek provides access to Grand Lake for fishing and boating. Facilities include 49 RV sites, 100 tent sites, paved interior roads and RV sites, lighted boat ramp, picnic areas and two covered group shelters, outdoor grills, 4 comfort stations with showers, dump station, a playground, swimming pool, a courtesy boat dock for loading and unloading, courtesy fishing dock, and fish cleaning station.

== Fees ==
To help fund a backlog of deferred maintenance and park improvements, the state implemented an entrance fee for this park and 21 others effective June 15, 2020. The fees, charged per vehicle, start at $10 per day for a single-day or $8 for residents with an Oklahoma license plate or Oklahoma tribal plate. Fees are waived for honorably discharged veterans and Oklahoma residents age 62 & older and their spouses. Passes good for three days or a week are also available; annual passes good at all 22 state parks charging fees are offered at a cost of $75 for out-of-state visitors or $60 for Oklahoma residents.
