= Clayton Lake State Park (Oklahoma) =

State park in Oklahoma, United States

- Location within Oklahoma
- Location: Pushmataha County, Oklahoma, United States
- Nearest city: Clayton, OK
- Coordinates: 34.539722°N 95.309722°W
- Area: 510 acres (210 ha)
- Governing body: Oklahoma Tourism and Recreation Department
- Website: www.travelok.com/listings/view.profile/id.1601

Clayton Lake State Park is a 510-acre (2.1 km^{2}) Oklahoma state park located in Pushmataha County, Oklahoma, 5 miles (8.0 km) south of Clayton, Oklahoma. It has RV sites and tent camping areas, along with primitive cabins, one family-style two bedroom cabin, picnic tables, group picnic shelters, comfort stations with showers, and boat ramps. The park also has an ADA accessible fishing dock, playground, hiking trails, and swimming beach. The park is 1 of 7 Oklahoma State Parks that are in the path of totality for the 2024 solar eclipse, with 1 minute and 20 seconds of totality.
