= Little River (Oklahoma) =

Little River may refer to the following rivers in the U.S. state of Oklahoma:

- Little River (Canadian River)
- Little River (Red River), also in Arkansas
