= Bernice State Park =

State park in Oklahoma, United States

Coordinates: 36°37′36″N 94°54′07″W

- Bernice Area at Grand Lake State Park
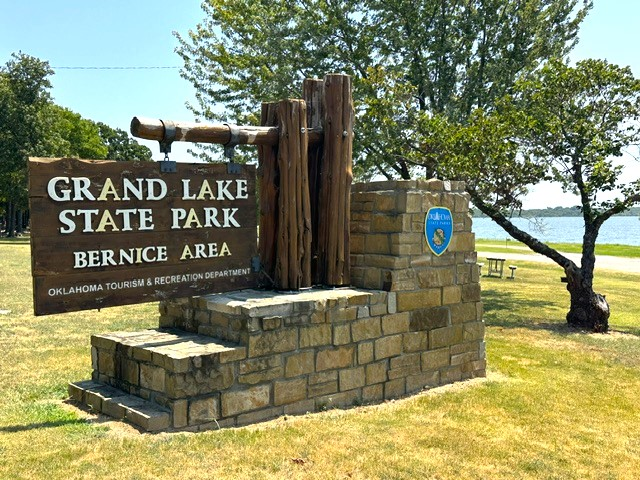
- Bernice Area at Grand Lake State Park, 8-2026

- Location within Oklahoma Location within the United States
- Location: Delaware County
- Nearest city: Bernice, OK
- Area: 88 acres (36 ha)
- Visitors: 70,451 (in 2021)

Bernice State Park, also called the Bernice Area at Grand Lake State Park, is an 88-acre (360,000 m^{2}) Oklahoma state park located in Delaware County, Oklahoma. It is located near the city of Bernice, Oklahoma at the northwestern corner of Grand Lake o' the Cherokees. The park is actually across the mouth of the Neosho River from the town of Bernice.

Known as the "Crappie Capital of the World," the park also offers fishing for largemouth bass, white bass, channel catfish and bluegill. Visitors will find semi-modern RV sites and tent campsites, comfort stations with showers, boat ramp, courtesy boat dock for loading and unloading, picnic areas, playground, one mile (1.6 km) paved walking and jogging path that is handicap accessible, two wildlife watch towers, swimming and a nature center.

== Nature center ==
The nature center has exhibits featuring indigenous wildlife. These include for example, beehives, taxidermied animals and a 1,000 US gallons (3.8 m^{3}) aquarium. The center has a full-time naturalist onsite, and offers classroom facilities and tours.

== Gallery ==
At the Bernice Area
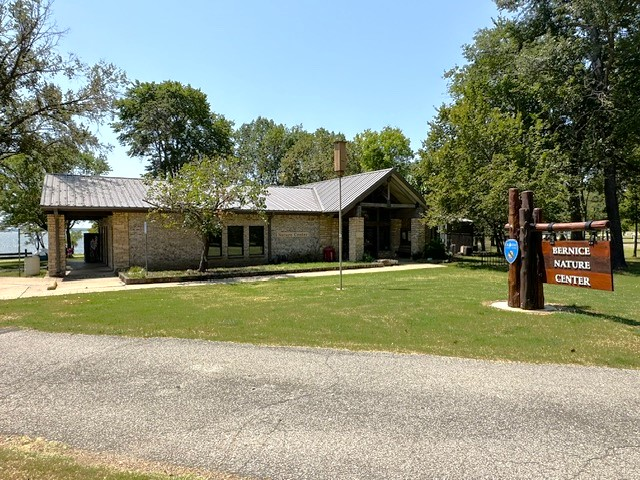
The Bernice Nature Center within the Park in August of 2026

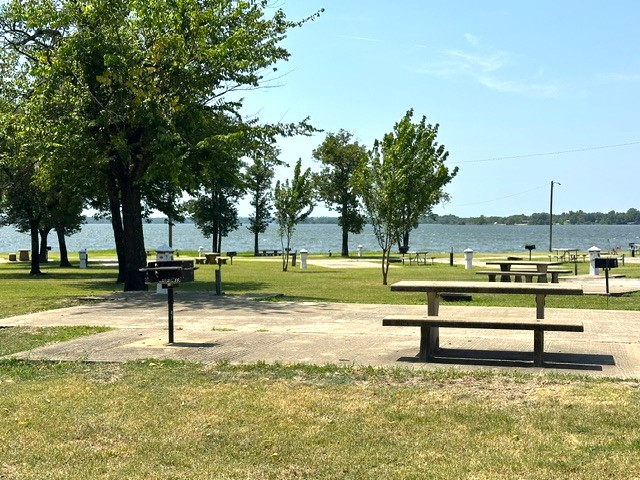
Part of the park's extensive picnic area, August 2026
