= Lake Eucha Park =

Park in Oklahoma, United States

- Location within Oklahoma
- Location: Delaware County, Oklahoma, United States
- Nearest city: Jay, OK
- Coordinates: 36°21′30″N 94°48′19″W
- Area: 31 acres (13 ha)
- Governing body: City of Tulsa
- Website: www.travelok.com/listings/view.profile/id.4329

Lake Eucha Park is a 31-acre (13 ha) former Oklahoma state park located in Delaware County, Oklahoma. It is now owned and managed by the city of Tulsa, and the closest town is Jay, Oklahoma. The park was previously known as Lake Eucha State Park and Upper Spavinaw State Park. There have been parks, state and otherwise, around the lake since at least 1938; the oldest lease clearly applying to this park was started in 1967.

Oddly enough, while the park includes the name "Lake" in its name, it is in fact not on the shore of Lake Eucha, and is in fact fenced off from the lake.

Lake Eucha Park is a 31-acre (130,000 m^{2}) day-use picnic area with a swimming pool. It is unique in that groups or families may reserve the entire park and pool. The park may be rented for 24 hours. The park also offers a large swimming pool with shelter, a barbecue area and poolside tables and chairs. The park area has an additional shelter with 55 picnic tables, as well as hiking trails and comfort stations. Overnight use (e.g., camping) is prohibited.

During March 2011, the Oklahoma Tourism and Recreation Department announced that it would close seven parks, including Lake Eucha State Park because of reductions in the departmental budget. But the park was not closed and its management was taken over by the City of Tulsa.

Lake Eucha Park was third on the list of least expensive state parks in 2011, with an annual operating cost of $15,300 and annual revenue of $7,500. It attracted less than 4,700 people in that year.
