= Fort Cobb State Park =

State park in Oklahoma, United States

- Location within Oklahoma
- Location: Caddo County, Oklahoma, United States
- Nearest city: Fort Cobb, OK
- Coordinates: 35.1836694°N 98.4661699°W
- Area: 1,872 acres (758 ha)
- Visitors: 415,531 (in 2021)
- Governing body: Oklahoma Tourism and Recreation Department
- Website: www.travelok.com/listings/view.profile/id.2822

Fort Cobb State Park is a 1,872-acre (7.58 km^{2}) Oklahoma state park located in Caddo County, Oklahoma, USA. It is located near the city of Fort Cobb. The park offers recreational activities and facilities including camping, fishing, boating, water sports, swimming, hiking and golf. A visitors' center is located on site, as well as a gift shop, bait and tackle shop, RV sites with water and electric hook-ups, primitive camping areas, scenic views of the lake, comfort stations, laundry facilities, picnic sites, three playgrounds, two swimming areas and marina. Equipment rentals are available. The park also has an 18-hole golf course with practice range, putting green and pro shop. The park has 282 RV sites, 35 of which have sewer, and 102 tent campsites.

== Fees ==
To help fund a backlog of deferred maintenance and park improvements, the state implemented an entrance fee for this park and 21 others effective June 15, 2020. The fees, charged per vehicle, start at $10 per day for a single-day or $8 for residents with an Oklahoma license plate or Oklahoma tribal plate. Fees are waived for honorably discharged veterans and Oklahoma residents age 62 & older and their spouses. Passes good for three days or a week are also available; annual passes good at all 22 state parks charging fees are offered at a cost of $75 for out-of-state visitors or $60 for Oklahoma residents. The 22 parks are:

- Arrowhead Area at Lake Eufaula State Park
- Beavers Bend State Park
- Boiling Springs State Park
- Cherokee Landing State Park
- Fort Cobb State Park
- Foss State Park
- Honey Creek Area at Grand Lake State Park
- Great Plains State Park
- Great Salt Plains State Park
- Greenleaf State Park
- Keystone State Park
- Lake Eufaula State Park
- Lake Murray State Park
- Lake Texoma State Park
- Lake Thunderbird State Park
- Lake Wister State Park
- Natural Falls State Park
- Osage Hills State Park
- Robbers Cave State Park
- Sequoyah State Park
- Tenkiller State Park
- Twin Bridges Area at Grand Lake State Park
