= Wah-Sha-She Park =

Park near Hulah lake in Oklahoma

- Location within Oklahoma
- Location: Osage County, Oklahoma, United States
- Nearest city: Copan, OK
- Coordinates: 36.925°N 96.0975°W
- Area: 266 acres (108 ha)
- Established: 1973
- Visitors: 15,000 (in 2012)
- Governing body: Osage Nation
- Website: www.travelok.com/listings/view.profile/id.8373

Wah-Sha-She Park, formerly named Wah-Sha-She State Park, is on the shore of Hulah Lake in Osage County, Oklahoma. The 266-acre (108 ha) park offers recreational activities including boating, fishing, swimming and camping. Hunting is allowed in the adjacent 8,900-acre (3,600 ha) Wildlife Management Area. There is also a 2,000-acre (810 ha) Waterfowl Refuge where birdwatching is allowed.

Regarding the name, one version has it coming from the Osage language, meaning "the water people." Another version claims the tribe called itself Wah-Zha-Zhe when French explorer Jacques Marquette encountered them in the 17th century. The map he produced in 1673 translated the name into the French as Ouchage. In effect, the park is named for the Osage people.

== History ==
This park was established in 1973. It is 15 miles (24 km) northwest of Pawhuska, Oklahoma, on Oklahoma State Highway 99, then 10 miles (16 km) east on State Highway 10. It is west of Copan, Oklahoma, on Oklahoma State Highway 10.

== Closure threatened ==
In 2011, the state announced its intention to close Wah-Sha-She State Park as part of its budget-cutting program. That Labor Day, the Osage Nation took over management of the park, which is owned by the United States Army Corps of Engineers.

Chief John Red Eagle said,

"The Osage people have made it clear that one of their priorities is to expand and improve water recreation on the reservation, including swimming, boating, camping and fishing. This one step enables the Osage Nation to begin realizing that goal."

Chief John Red Eagle of the Osage Nation signed a management agreement with the Corps of Engineers in May 2012, although the Osage legislative branch had previously voted down funding the take-over. The agreement extends through 2016, at which time the Osage Nation will reevaluate whether to extend it.

A news report in 2013 indicated that the tribe had upgraded the park. It attracted 15,000 visitors in 2012 and the number in mid 2013 had surpassed that of the previous year.

Unfortunately, revenues declined in 2014 to $24,000 from $50,000 in 2013. Operating expenses rose from $140,000 in 2014 to about $150,000 in 2015. Principal Chief Geoffrey Standing Bear notified the Corps of Engineers that the Osage Nation would terminate its lease for the park.

== Compromise ==
In October, 2014, a group of local residents organized the non-profit Hulah Lake Osage Association (HLOA) to save the park from permanent closure. The Corps of Engineers said that the Osage Nation could not lease the park to a private entity, but that if the Nation continued to hold title, the Corps could approve a sublease to a private entity. So, the Osage Nation subleased to HLOA, while HLOA agreed to "...operate and maintain the park, collect camping fees, (and) keep track of the revenue..." while also pledging to "maintain the park, keep it clean, keep it mowed, all on a volunteer basis." As of 2020 HLOA still had the park open, supported by campground fees.

== Activities ==
The campground offers large RV sites with views of the lake, and electric and water hookups are available.

The lake is known for its catfish, and by 2026, HLOA was in its 9th year of running an annual Noodling Tournament at the park.
