= Sequoyah Bay State Park =

State park in Oklahoma, United States

- Location within Oklahoma
- Location: Wagoner County, Oklahoma, United States
- Nearest city: Wagoner, OK
- Coordinates: 35°53′13″N 95°16′22″W
- Area: 303 acres (123 ha)
- Visitors: 96,100 (in 2021)
- Governing body: Oklahoma Tourism and Recreation Department
- Website: www.travelok.com/listings/view.profile/id.6729

Sequoyah Bay State Park is on the western shore of Fort Gibson Lake in Wagoner County, Oklahoma. It is 4.3 miles (6.9 km) south of Wagoner, Oklahoma on State Highway 16. It offers several campgrounds, each named for a notable chief of the Five Civilized Tribes. These include: Chief Attacullaculla, Cherokee; Chief Pushmataha, Choctaw; Chief Osceola, Seminole; Chief Opothleyahola, Creek; and Chief Payamataha, Chickasaw.

The park contains 303 acres (123 ha) and 367 sites for recreational vehicles or tents.
