= Lake Thunderbird State Park =

State park in Oklahoma, United States

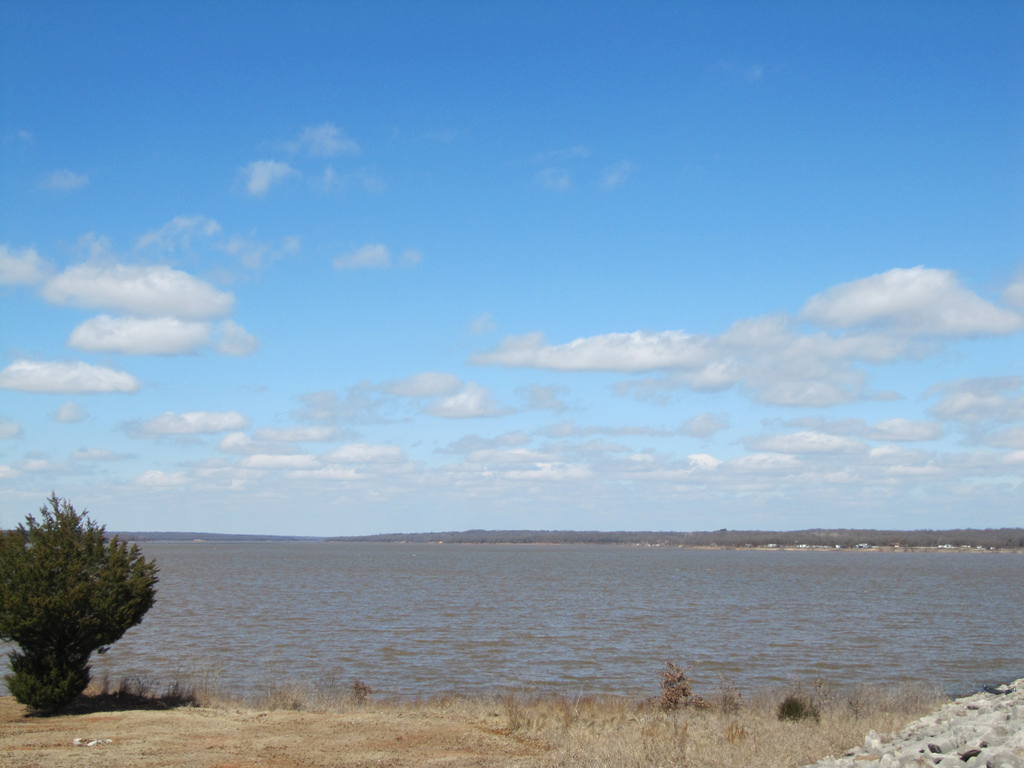
- Lake Thunderbird

- Location within Oklahoma
- Location: Cleveland County, Oklahoma, United States
- Nearest city: Norman, OK
- Coordinates: 35°12′40″N 97°14′30″W
- Area: 1,874 acres (758 ha)
- Established: 1965
- Visitors: 1,101,403 (in 2021)
- Governing body: Oklahoma Tourism and Recreation Department
- Website: www.travelok.com/listings/view.profile/id.4386

Lake Thunderbird State Park is a 1,874-acre (7.58 km^{2}) Oklahoma state park located in Cleveland County, Oklahoma. It is 12 miles (19 km) east of Norman, Oklahoma on State Highway 9.

The park provides recreational access to Lake Thunderbird. In addition to boating, fishing, and swimming, the park offers a variety of land-based activities.

There are two marinas (Calypso Cove Marina and Little River Marina), nine boat ramps and a swim area at the lake. The park has over 200 sites for parking recreational vehicles (RVs), including 30 full hookups. There are also restrooms, primitive campsites and a seasonal restaurant.

The park had over 637,000 visitors in 2011, earned $461,506 from activity fees, and cost $1.2 million to operate.

== Recreation ==
In addition to water-based recreation, the park offers a variety of land-based activities. These include camping, hunting, horse rental and boarding, equestrian trails, hiking, mountain biking, bird watching, nature trails, a nature center, and an archery range.

=== Boating ===
The lake has two marinas and a boathouse that are operated and maintained by the Lake Thunderbird Boathouse volunteer organization. The Boathouse Organization in cooperation with the Lake Thunderbird Education Foundation make possible several events throughout the year, including sailing lessons, sailing camps for children, an annual fishing derby for developmentally disabled children, sanctioned sailboat races, and fun regattas.

=== Swimming ===
There are a number of specified swimming beaches at Lake Thunderbird, including Zoom Beach and Little Sandy. Little Sandy is protected by a buoy-line about 50 yards from the shore that prevents boat access, Zoom Beach has a designated swimming area with buoys indicating 'no boats' allowed. Regular weekly organized open water swimming events are organized by the Triathlon Club of Oklahoma City in partnership with the Lake Thunderbird Boathouse from the end of April through to the end of September each year.

=== Fishing ===
Fish species stocked at the lake include large-mouth bass, crappie, sunfish, channel catfish, white bass, and saugeye.

=== Bird watching ===
Lake Thunderbird falls within the bald eagle winter migration corridor. Bald eagles are present at the lake roughly from December through February. Guided eagle tours are provided by the Crow's Secret Nature Center.

== In media ==
In recent years claims of a lake monster have arisen, imagined by some to be a freshwater octopus. The octopus claims have been dispelled by there being no freshwater species of the animal, and the lake being a recently manmade (in geologic time) impoundment of upstream river flow lacking any such creatures.

== Pop culture references ==
Oklahoma native and country music artist Toby Keith wrote a 2010 song "Kissin' in the Rain" about Lake Thunderbird off his Bullets in the Gun album. His final album Peso in My Pocket, released in 2021, also featured a song about the lake.
