= Lake Eufaula State Park =

State park in Oklahoma, United States

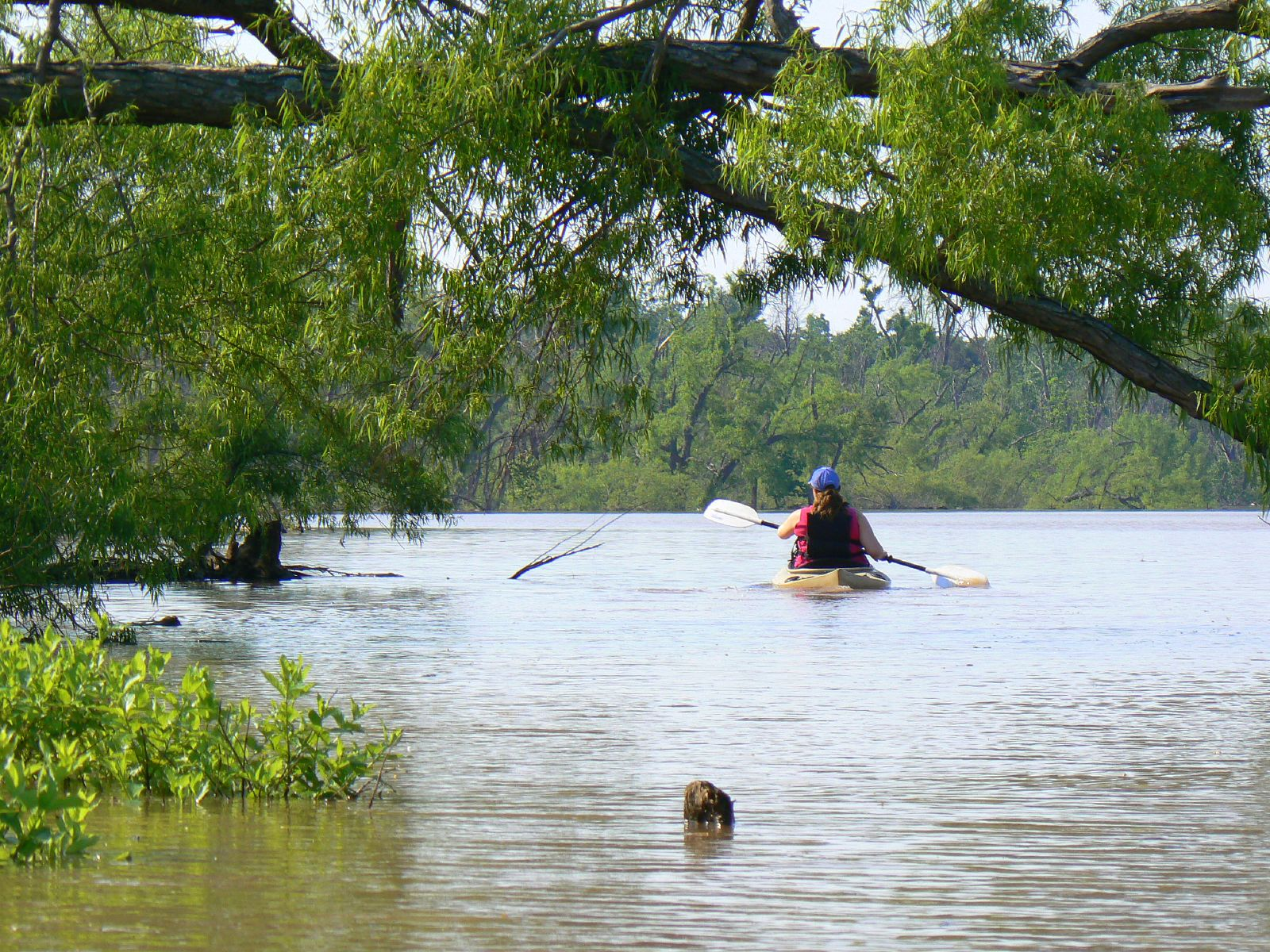
- Lake Eufaula State Park, May 2007

- Location within Oklahoma
- Location: McIntosh County, Oklahoma, United States
- Nearest city: Checotah, OK
- Coordinates: 35°24′17″N 95°36′24″W
- Area: 2,853 acres (1,155 ha)
- Visitors: 229,398 (in 2021)
- Governing body: Oklahoma Department of Tourism and Recreation
- Website: www.travelok.com/listings/view.profile/id.4336

Lake Eufaula State Park is a 2,853-acre (11.55 km^{2}) Oklahoma state park located in McIntosh County, Oklahoma on Lake Eufaula. It is 14 miles (23 km) southwest of Checotah. The park was formerly known as Fountainhead State Park. Fountainhead, together with the neighboring Arrowhead State Park, were created in 1965. Fountainhead's name was changed to Lake Eufaula State Park effective November 1, 2002. Arrowhead is now known as the Arrowhead Area at Lake Eufaula State Park.

The park has a swimming area with a beach, and multiple boat ramps. Fishing is possible year-round, and a marina and a tackle shop are located within the park. The Deep Fork Nature Center is located within the park; and there are hiking, mountain bike, and equestrian trails. On Hummingbird Beach, there is an 18-hole disc golf course. The park also has campsites for RV and tents, as well as three yurts.

== Fees ==
To help fund a backlog of deferred maintenance and park improvements, the state implemented an entrance fee for this park and 21 others effective June 15, 2020. The fees, charged per vehicle, start at $10 per day for a single-day or $8 for residents with an Oklahoma license plate or Oklahoma tribal plate. Fees are waived for honorably discharged veterans and Oklahoma residents age 62 & older and their spouses. Passes good for three days or a week are also available; annual passes good at all 22 state parks charging fees are offered at a cost of $75 for out-of-state visitors or $60 for Oklahoma residents. The 22 parks are:

- Arrowhead Area at Lake Eufaula State Park
- Beavers Bend State Park
- Boiling Springs State Park
- Cherokee Landing State Park
- Fort Cobb State Park
- Foss State Park
- Honey Creek Area at Grand Lake State Park
- Great Plains State Park
- Great Salt Plains State Park
- Greenleaf State Park
- Keystone State Park
- Lake Eufaula State Park
- Lake Murray State Park
- Lake Texoma State Park
- Lake Thunderbird State Park
- Lake Wister State Park
- Natural Falls State Park
- Osage Hills State Park
- Robbers Cave State Park
- Sequoyah State Park
- Tenkiller State Park
- Twin Bridges Area at Grand Lake State Park

== Fountainhead Lodge ==
The park was formerly home to Fountainhead Lodge, a 202-room state-run resort hotel financed by state bonds and federal economic development loans. Fountainhead was one of two lodges built on Eufaula Lake in 1965, the other being Arrowhead Lodge at Arrowhead State Park. The lodge was never very profitable, and the state was threatened with foreclosure on both Arrowhead and Fountainhead by the federal government in 1983. The lodge closed in December, 1984, and was deeded to the U.S. Economic Development Administration. In 1985, the lodge was sold to a group led by Melvyn Bell of Little Rock, Arkansas. By 1990, Bell Equities had invested millions of dollars in upgrades. In 2005, the lodge was sold at sheriff's auction to the Muscogee (Creek) Nation, who subsequently demolished the hotel in 2008. At the time of demolition, the Muscogee Nation had plans to build a new resort at the same location.
