= Lake Wister State Park =

State park in Oklahoma, United States

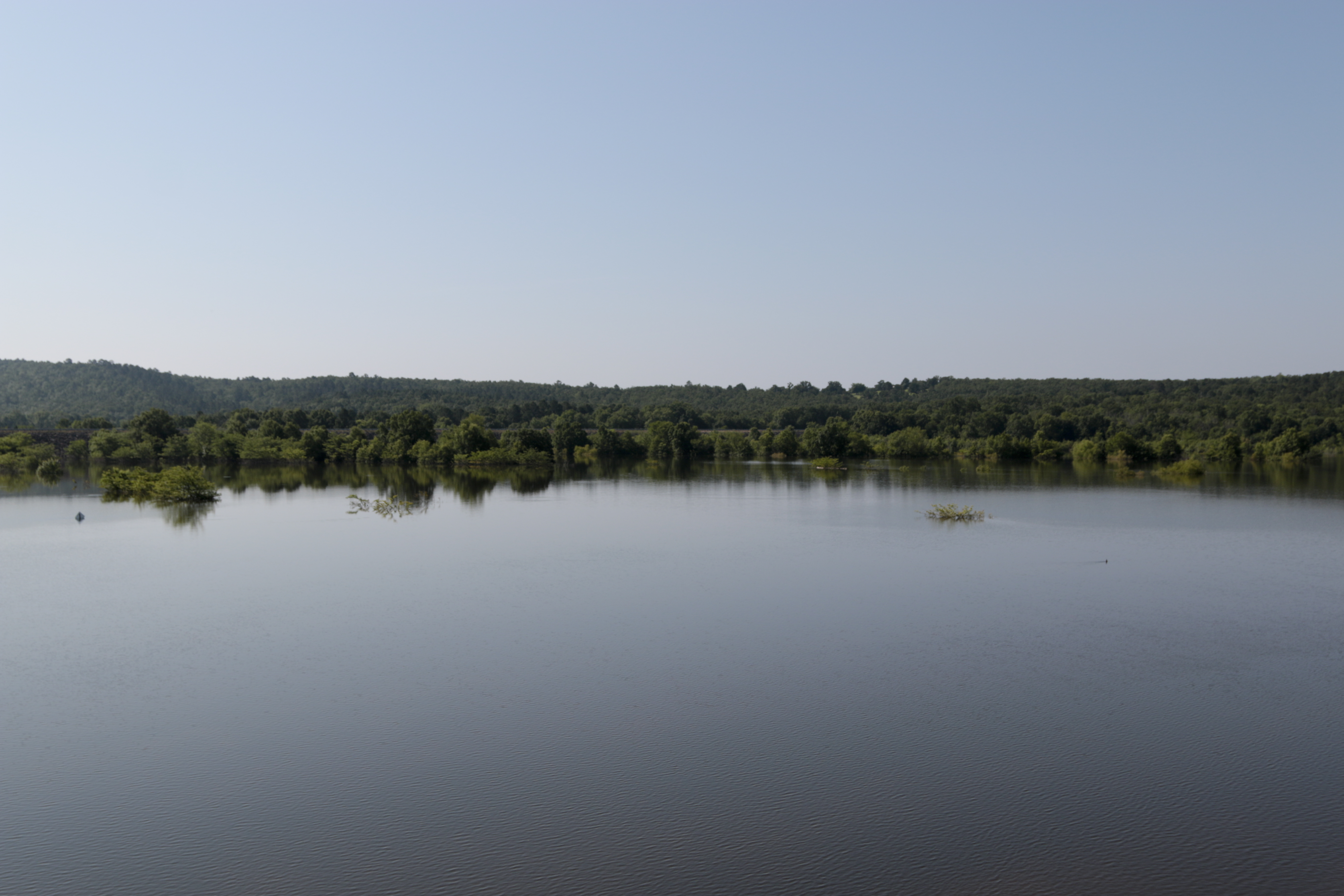

- Location within Oklahoma
- Location: Le Flore County, Oklahoma, United States
- Nearest city: Wister, OK
- Coordinates: 34°55′08″N 94°46′16″W
- Area: 3,428 acres (1,387 ha)
- Visitors: 855,890 (in 2021)
- Governing body: Oklahoma Tourism and Recreation Department
- Website: www.travelok.com/listings/view.profile/id.4390

Lake Wister State Park is a 3,428-acre (13.87 km^{2}) Oklahoma state park located in Le Flore County, Oklahoma. It is located near the city of Wister, Oklahoma.

Lake Wister State Park, in southeast Oklahoma, is a gateway to the beautiful Ouachita National Forest. The park includes 7,300-acre (30 km^{2}) Lake Wister with five camping areas. The park offers many recreational activities including hiking, camping, bicycling, picnics, fishing, hunting, boating and water skiing. Enjoy the water spray park for children and adults. A waterfowl refuge is nearby, and hunting is allowed at Wister Wildlife Management Area. Camping facilities include cabins, tent sites and RV sites with both modern and semi-modern. Other facilities include comfort stations with showers, picnic tables, group picnic shelters, lighted boat ramps, unlighted gravel ramp, playgrounds, nature center, miniature golf course and swimming beach. Hiking trails include a self-guided nature trail, handicapped trail and a 4-mile (6.4 km) round trip trail. Lake Wister State Park has a fully equipped group camp that accommodates 100 visitors and includes a full kitchen and dining hall.

The park is 1 of 7 Oklahoma State Parks that are in the path of totality for the 2024 solar eclipse, with 1 minute and 44 seconds of totality.
