= Tenkiller State Park =

Oklahoma state park at Lake Tenkiller

- Location within Oklahoma
- Location: Sequoyah County, Oklahoma, United States
- Nearest city: Gore, OK
- Coordinates: 35°36′00″N 95°01′58″W
- Area: 1,190 acres (480 ha)
- Established: 1953
- Visitors: 413,396 (in 2021)
- Governing body: Oklahoma Tourism and Recreation Department
- Website: www.travelok.com/listings/view.profile/id.7706

Tenkiller State Park is a 1,190-acre (4.8 km^{2}) Oklahoma state park located in northwestern Sequoyah County, Oklahoma, near the towns of Vian, Oklahoma and Gore, Oklahoma. Larger towns nearby include Sallisaw, Gore, and Webbers Falls, Oklahoma. (Note: Many local residents refer to this park as,"...heaven in the hills.")

The park adjoins Lake Tenkiller, which is the sixth-largest reservoir in Oklahoma, based on normal water capacity. An area of 2,590-acre (10.5 km^{2}), abutting the park on the west, comprises the Tenkiller Wildlife Management Area, and is licensed to the Oklahoma Department of Wildlife Conservation for a state game management and hunting area. Hunters in this area will find abundant deer, quail, dove, duck, geese, rabbit and squirrel.

The park is 1 of 7 Oklahoma State Parks that are in the path of totality for the 2024 solar eclipse, with 3 minute and 54 seconds of totality.

== History ==
Tenkiller Ferry Lake, also known as Lake Tenkiller, was named after the Tenkillers, a prominent Cherokee family who owned the land in the area. The park was added to the Oklahoma State Park System in 1953, when the Oklahoma Tourism and Recreation Department (ORTD) leased land adjacent to the Tenkiller Ferry Project from the U. S. Army Corps of Engineers (USACE).

== Ecology ==
The state park contains oak, timber, willow, sycamore, hackberry, elm, ash and birch. Wildlife includes deer, turkey, bobwhite quail, cottontail rabbits, squirrels, gray fox, coyote, bobcat, raccoon, skunk, mink and opossum. Bald eagles winter along Lake Tenkiller.

== Attractions ==
Lake Tenkiller facilities include a scuba diving park, volleyball court, basketball court, shuffleboard court, horseshoe pit, amphitheater, playgrounds, community building, a swimming pool, nature center, group picnic shelters, swim beaches, kids' fishing pond, paved hiking trail and lighted boat ramps.

Guests may choose from 39 cabins, ranging from one to three bedroom styles. All the cabins, except for the three bedroom model, are duplexes. Cabins are equipped with dishes, linens, full kitchens, heat, air conditioning and satellite television. Tenkiller State Park also offers courtyard cottages. Each room features heat and air, a refrigerator and linens. The park also features RV and tent campsites, as well as restrooms and showers.

Children 16 and under may catch their limit of three fish per day with no charge or permit required in the kids' fishing pond. The park's Pine Cove Marina offers fuel, gifts, sportswear, snacks, repairs and boat slip rentals, as well as the floating Clearwater Cafe. The underwater scuba diving park features underwater attractions ranging from a completely submerged school bus, various sunken boats, an aircraft fuselage and more.

== Fees ==
To help fund a backlog of deferred maintenance and park improvements, the state implemented an entrance fee for this park and 21 others effective June 15, 2020. The fees, charged per vehicle, start at $10 per day for a single-day or $8 for residents with an Oklahoma license plate or Oklahoma tribal plate. Fees are waived for honorably discharged veterans and Oklahoma residents age 62 & older and their spouses. Passes good for three days or a week are also available; annual passes good at all 22 state parks charging fees are offered at a cost of $75 for out-of-state visitors or $60 for Oklahoma residents. The 22 parks are:

- Arrowhead Area at Lake Eufaula State Park
- Beavers Bend State Park
- Boiling Springs State Park
- Cherokee Landing State Park
- Fort Cobb State Park
- Foss State Park
- Honey Creek Area at Grand Lake State Park
- Great Plains State Park
- Great Salt Plains State Park
- Greenleaf State Park
- Keystone State Park
- Lake Eufaula State Park
- Lake Murray State Park
- Lake Texoma State Park
- Lake Thunderbird State Park
- Lake Wister State Park
- Natural Falls State Park
- Osage Hills State Park
- Robbers Cave State Park
- Sequoyah State Park
- Tenkiller State Park
- Twin Bridges Area at Grand Lake State Park

== See also ==
- Lake Tenkiller
