= Osage Hills State Park =

State park in Osage County, Oklahoma

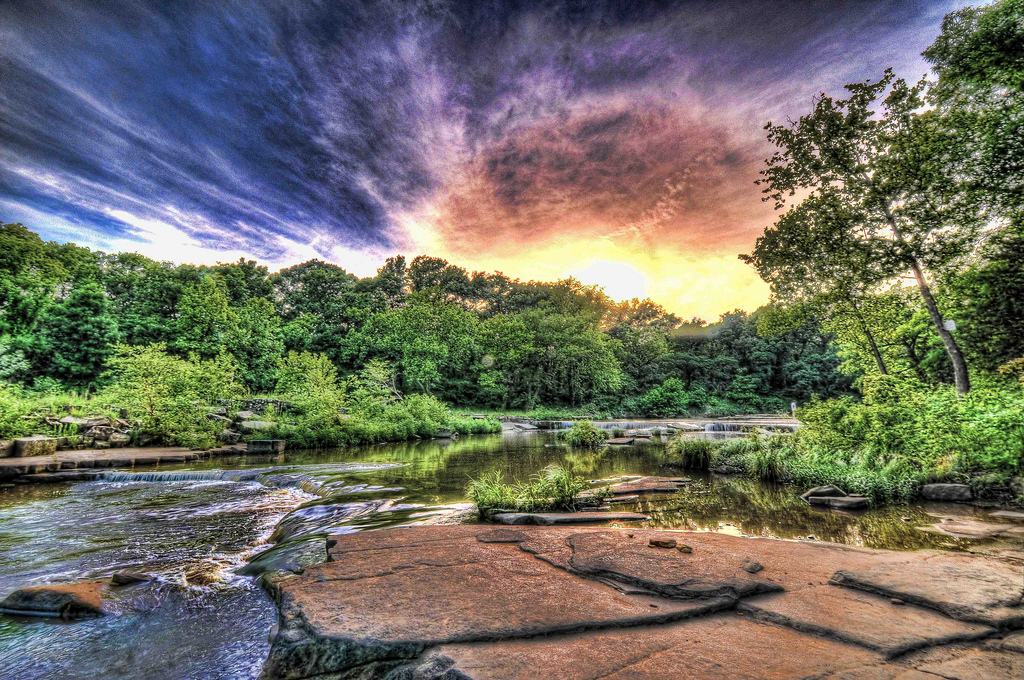
- Sand Creek in Osage Hills State Park

- Location within Oklahoma
- Location: Osage County, Oklahoma, United States
- Nearest city: Bartlesville, OK
- Coordinates: 36°44′30″N 96°10′47″W
- Area: 1,100 acres (450 ha)
- Established: 1935
- Visitors: 130,772 (in 2021)
- Governing body: Oklahoma Tourism and Recreation Department
- Website: www.travelok.com/listings/view.profile/id.5595

Osage Hills State Park is a 1,100-acre (4.5 km^{2}) Oklahoma state park It is located in eastern Osage County, Oklahoma. The nearest cities are Pawhuska and Bartlesville. The park offers outdoor recreation opportunities including camping, hiking, fishing and wildlife watching. Park facilities include picnic tables and shelters, 20 semi-modern RV campsites, 16 tent sites and 8 cabins. Several of the park's structures are historic parkitecture built by the Civilian Conservation Corps during the 1930s and 1940s.

== History ==
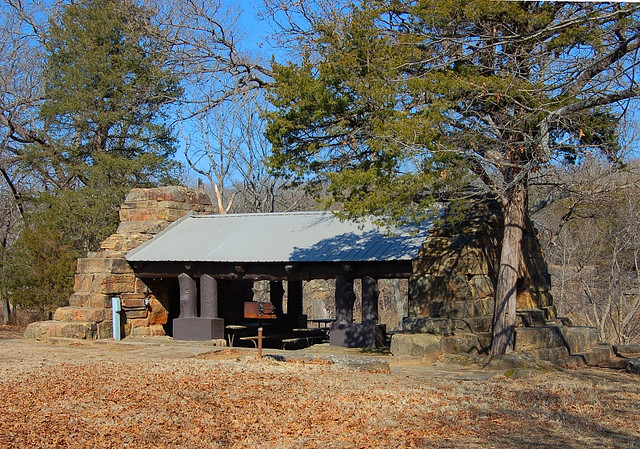
Picnic shelter built by the Civilian Conservation Corps in Osage Hills State Park.

Osage Hills State Park is one of the seven original parks constructed for the State of Oklahoma by members of the Civilian Conservation Corps (CCC). Construction began in 1935. The CCC workers were housed at the north end of the park. The remnants of the housing area still visible include concrete and rock foundations, an amphitheater and a lone chimney. The workers built structures using stone and timber that were obtained locally. Their design was based on “naturalistic architecture,” similar to that used in other parks built by the U. S. Government during the 1930s and 40s. Eight guest cabins are still used today. Although their appearance is the same as when they were built, they have all been modernized with energy-saving appliances and air conditioning.

The park also has a large picnic shelter that is suitable for use by large groups. It has a kitchen, a large dining area, and two stone fireplaces on opposite sides of the building.

== Recreation ==
Abundant fishing for bass, crappie, catfish, and perch can be found in Lookout Lake, or in Sand Creek at the south end of the park. Miles of hiking trails cross the park offering opportunities for beginning hikers or more challenging paths. Wildlife is abundant in the park and includes whitetail deer, wild turkey, bobcat, raccoon, and more.

Other facilities include hiking trails and a swimming pool. There are also tent campgrounds and recreational vehicle (RV) parking areas.

== Fees ==
To help fund a backlog of deferred maintenance and park improvements, the state implemented an entrance fee for this park and 21 others effective June 15, 2020. The fees, charged per vehicle, start at $10 per day for a single-day or $8 for residents with an Oklahoma license plate or Oklahoma tribal plate. Fees are waived for honorably discharged veterans and Oklahoma residents age 62 & older and their spouses. Passes good for three days or a week are also available; annual passes good at all 22 state parks charging fees are offered at a cost of $75 for out-of-state visitors or $60 for Oklahoma residents. The 22 parks are:

- Arrowhead Area at Lake Eufaula State Park
- Beavers Bend State Park
- Boiling Springs State Park
- Cherokee Landing State Park
- Fort Cobb State Park
- Foss State Park
- Honey Creek Area at Grand Lake State Park
- Great Plains State Park
- Great Salt Plains State Park
- Greenleaf State Park
- Keystone State Park
- Lake Eufaula State Park
- Lake Murray State Park
- Lake Texoma State Park
- Lake Thunderbird State Park
- Lake Wister State Park
- Natural Falls State Park
- Osage Hills State Park
- Robbers Cave State Park
- Sequoyah State Park
- Tenkiller State Park
- Twin Bridges Area at Grand Lake State Park
