= Cherokee Landing State Park =

State park in Oklahoma, United States

- Location within Oklahoma
- Location: Cherokee County, Oklahoma, United States
- Nearest city: Park Hill, OK
- Coordinates: 35.7589808°N 94.9088409°W
- Area: 146 acres (59 ha)
- Visitors: 124,579 (in 2021)
- Governing body: Oklahoma Tourism and Recreation Department
- Website: www.travelok.com/listings/view.profile/id.1290

Cherokee Landing State Park is a 146-acre (0.59 km^{2}) Oklahoma state park located in Cherokee County, Oklahoma. It is located near Park Hill, Oklahoma on a peninsula jutting into Lake Tenkiller in the Cookson Hills, south of Tahlequah. The park features 93 RV campsites with electric power and water hookups, dump station, 45 primitive campsites, covered picnic shelters, restrooms with hot showers, boating, lighted boat ramp, water skiing, swimming beach, fishing, handicapped fishing dock, playgrounds and a softball field.

The park is open seven days per week from 7:30 A.M. to 4:00 P.M., though the office is staffed by a volunteer only Wednesday through Saturday 9:00 A.M. through 2:00 P.M.

Hunting is not allowed in the park, but there is a 2,950 acres (11.9 km^{2}) area west of the park boundary that is a state game management and hunting area. This area is under the jurisdiction of the Oklahoma Department of Wildlife Conservation. Hunting is allowed there. Popular game species for hunting are :deer, quail, dove, duck, geese, rabbit and squirrel.

The main road into the parks and the boat ramps is open year-round. Wildcat Point is closed November 1 to April 1. All other restrooms and campgrounds are closed from December 1 until March 1.

== Fees ==
To help fund a backlog of deferred maintenance and park improvements, the state implemented an entrance fee for this park and 21 others effective June 15, 2020. The fees, charged per vehicle, start at $10 per day for a single-day or $8 for residents with an Oklahoma license plate or Oklahoma tribal plate. Fees are waived for honorably discharged veterans and Oklahoma residents age 62 & older and their spouses. Passes good for three days or a week are also available; annual passes good at all 22 state parks charging fees are offered at a cost of $75 for out-of-state visitors or $60 for Oklahoma residents. The 22 parks are:

- Arrowhead Area at Lake Eufaula State Park
- Beavers Bend State Park
- Boiling Springs State Park
- Cherokee Landing State Park
- Fort Cobb State Park
- Foss State Park
- Honey Creek Area at Grand Lake State Park
- Great Plains State Park
- Great Salt Plains State Park
- Greenleaf State Park
- Keystone State Park
- Lake Eufaula State Park
- Lake Murray State Park
- Lake Texoma State Park
- Lake Thunderbird State Park
- Lake Wister State Park
- Natural Falls State Park
- Osage Hills State Park
- Robbers Cave State Park
- Sequoyah State Park
- Tenkiller State Park
- Twin Bridges Area at Grand Lake State Park

== See also ==
Lake Tenkiller
