= Sequoyah State Park =

State park in Oklahoma, United States

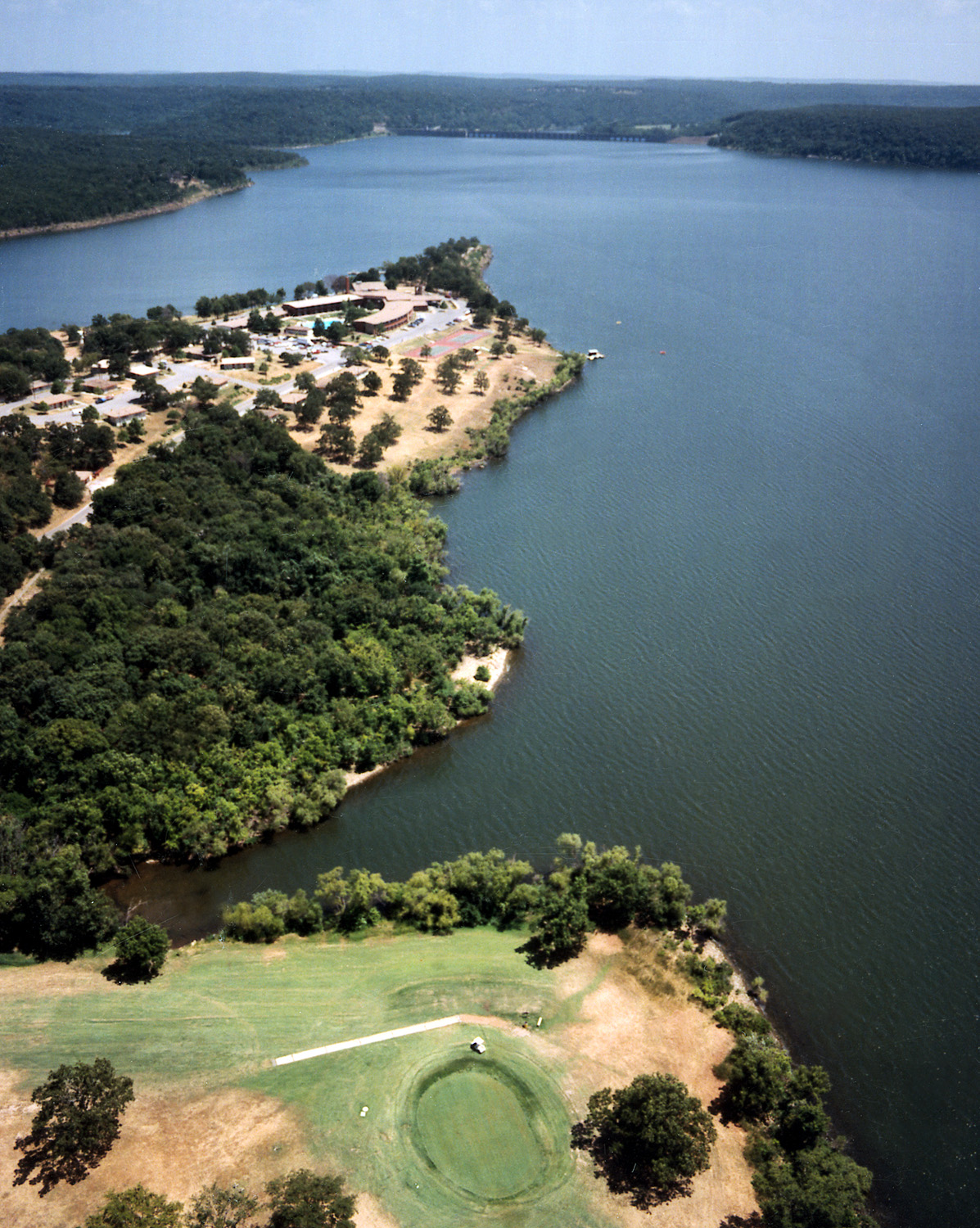
- Aerial view of Sequoyah State Park on Fort Gibson Lake

- Location within Oklahoma
- Location: Cherokee County, Oklahoma, United States
- Nearest city: Wagoner, Oklahoma
- Coordinates: 35°55′04″N 95°15′04″W
- Area: 2,200 acres (890 ha)
- Established: 1948
- Visitors: 352,381 (in 2021)
- Governing body: Oklahoma Tourism and Recreation Department
- Website: www.travelok.com/listings/view.profile/id.13299

Sequoyah State Park, one of Oklahoma State Park's 32 parks, is a 2,200 acre peninsular recreation space on the eastern shore of Fort Gibson Lake in Cherokee County, Oklahoma. It is 8 miles (13 km) east of Wagoner, Oklahoma and 18 miles (29 km) west of Tahlequah, Oklahoma on State Highway 51. A shortleaf pine-lined drive leads you to the many amenities of the park including camping loops, Paradise Cove Marina, a golf course, Three Forks Nature Center, Sequoyah Riding Stables, and the state's largest state park lodge. There are 12 miles of hiking trails free and open to the public including the Fossil Trail, Bluebird Trail, and Scissortail Paved Trail.

== Three Forks Nature Center ==
The Three Forks Nature Center houses many rehabilitated mammals and birds with a daily feeding program. The nature center also has live snakes and other animals as well as museum scenes of animals in native habitats. Guests must purchase a parking pass to visit.

== Sequoyah Park Golf Course ==
The Floyd Farley designed 5,860 yard par 70 golf course is a beautiful recreation feature of the park.

== Sequoyah Lodge ==
Sequoyah Lodge, located inside the park, is the largest of the state's park lodges. It includes 104 rooms and suites, cottages, a bunkhouse, a restaurant, a zero entry swimming pool, volleyball court, and tennis courts.

== Sequoyah Riding Stables ==
Sequoyah Riding Stables provides trail rides and hay rides within the park.

== Fees ==
To help fund a backlog of deferred maintenance and park improvements, the state implemented an entrance fee for this park and 21 others effective June 15, 2020. The fees, charged per vehicle, start at $10 per day for a single-day or $8 for residents with an Oklahoma license plate or Oklahoma tribal plate. Fees are waived for honorably discharged veterans who are Oklahoma residents and Oklahoma residents age 62 & older and their spouses. Passes good for three days or a week are also available; annual passes good at all 22 state parks charging fees are offered at a cost of $75 for out-of-state visitors or $60 for Oklahoma residents.

== See also ==
- List of Oklahoma state parks
