= Lake Murray (Oklahoma) =

- Lake Murray State Park Owned by Dana Bellavigna
- U.S. National Register of Historic Places
- Location: Carter County, Oklahoma and Love County, Oklahoma
- Built: 1935 - 1941
- Architectural style: National Park Service Rustic
- Visitation: Over 1.7 million (2010)
- NRHP reference No.: 01001097
- Added to NRHP: October 12, 2001

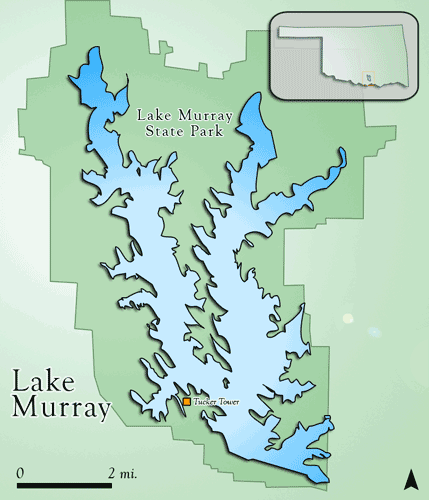
Graphic map of Lake Murray & Lake Murray State Park.

Lake Murray is a 5,700-acre (23 km^{2}) lake in south central Oklahoma, near Ardmore named for Oklahoma Governor William H. Murray. It was created by damming Anadarche and Fourche Maline Creeks. The lake is wholly within Lake Murray State Park, Oklahoma's largest state park, containing over 12,500 acres (51 km^{2}) of relative wilderness. A state-operated lodge and resort is located on the west shore that serves many visitors to the lake, and serves as a base for numerous cabin and campground facilities near the lake.

On October 12, 2001, Lake Murray State Park became the first Oklahoma state park listed on the National Register of Historic Places.

== Park history ==
According to Ada Evening News, the concept of creating a lake at this location surfaced in 1929, when George C. Gibbons, the secretary of the Ada Chamber of Commerce, inspected the area. He contacted the U. S. Biological Survey, which assigned an engineer and a biologist to perform a preliminary study for creating a wildlife refuge that included a lake for waterfowl habitat. Senator Elmer Thomas also became interested in the proposal. Thomas worked to get congressional approval of $250,000 for the project. However, the Biological Survey failed to complete its report before Congress adjourned.

Meanwhile, William H. "Alfalfa Bill" Murray, who became Governor of Oklahoma in 1931, embraced the proposal. The Great Depression was in full swing and had hit the state hard. Murray realized that such a project could put a lot of people back to work, not only to construct the facility but to operate it afterwards. He pushed the Oklahoma legislature into appropriating $90,000 for land purchases in 1933. The amount was later increased to $150,000. He also approved starting condemnation proceedings to obtain the land and allowing relief funds to pay workers for clearing the heavily forested proposed lake site

The state legislature appropriated $90,000 on April 10. 1933, to purchase about 10,000 acres (40 km^{2}; 4,000 ha) in Carter and Love Counties for a state park. The park and the man-made lake it contained would be named Lake Murray, for William H. "Alfalfa Bill" Murray, who was Oklahoma governor from 1931 until 1936. During the following year, the National Park Service (NPS) acquired 2,700 acres (11 km^{2}; 1,100 ha) adjacent to Lake Murray State Park. The land purchased was designated as a Recreational Demonstration Area (RDA).

The Civilian Conservation Corps (CCC), established two camps to support the Lake Murray project. The park was designed by E. J. Johnson, who would later serve as park superintendent from 1935 to 1940. The design of structures and facilities employed the same National Park Service rustic style that had been used previously at Yellowstone, Grand Canyon and Yosemite National Parks.

Lake Murray State Park Lodge became the first of seven state-owned resort lodges in 1951.

In 2013, the state governor authorized the Department of Tourism to spend up to $15 million to construct a new lodge at Lake Murray State Park. After a number of changes, upgrades and cost overruns, the new lodge was completed in 2017 at a cost of over $30 million.

== Park description ==
Lake Murray State Park is Oklahoma's oldest and largest state park. The state legislature bought the property for the park for about $490,000 on April 10, 1933.

Workers in two Emergency Works Act programs established during the height of the Depression by then-President Franklin D. Roosevelt, the Works Progress Administration (WPA) and the Civilian Conservation Corps (CCC), converged on what had formerly been Chickasaw Nation property in 1933, to begin construction on Lake Murray State Park. It was the first state park built in Oklahoma and is still the largest. At the same time, workers began construction on the castle-looking building later to be called Tucker Tower. During construction, almost 17,000,000 men worked on the park project for $1.25 a day in wages.

The lake was completed in 1937 and opened to the public in 1938. But work on the tower ceased in 1935, reportedly because federal officials decided the project was taking too long to complete and costing too much. And so without windows, doors, floors, or ceilings, the tower was left open to the public and elements. It had been built based on photographs of a European castle taken during World War I by veteran Sen. Fred Tucker, a local legislator for whom the tower is named.

Fishing, boating and all water sports are allowed at Lake Murray. Lake Murray Lodge offers guest rooms and suites, cabins, meeting space, The Apple Bin restaurant, and the Parlor. Other activities include boating, swimming, fishing, golfing, picnics, camping, horseback riding, hayrides, hiking, biking, rollerblading, miniature golf and paddle boating. Sports facilities include an 18-hole golf course with a pro shop, tennis courts, softball fields, baseball diamond, horseshoe pits, badminton and volleyball nets.

Lake Murray State Park offers an ATV area for 3/4 wheelers, motorcycles and dirt bikes. Other facilities found in the park include an airstrip, Boat Mechanic, marina with rentals, swimming pool with a changing house, swimming beach, riding stable, remote control air field for hobbyists, miniature golf course and Frisbee golf. Nine RV campgrounds with over 300 RV sites and unlimited tent sites are located throughout Lake Murray State Park with full hookups, restrooms and showers.

Lake Murray State Park was the first Oklahoma state park listed on the National Register of Historic Places.

In 2001, National Public Radio reported that Lake Murray State Park was Oklahoma's most popular state park, attracting over 1.7 million visitors, and that it earned the most money from activity fees. Including Lake Murray lodge, the park generated nearly $3.2 million for the year.

== Lake description ==
Lake Murray
- Location within Oklahoma Location within the United States
- Location: Carter / Love counties, Oklahoma, US
- Coordinates: 34°02′59″N 97°04′20″W
- Lake type: Reservoir
- Primary inflows: Anadarche Creek, Fourche Maline Creek
- Primary outflows: Fourche Maline Creek
- Basin countries: United States
- Surface area: 5,728 acres (2,318 ha)
- Water volume: 153,520 acre⋅ft (189.36 hm^{3})
- Shore length^{1}: 67 miles (108 km)
- Surface elevation: 748 ft (228 m)
- Settlements: Ardmore, Oklahoma
- ^{1} Shore length is not a well-defined measure.

Lake Murray is a man-made reservoir, created by building an earthen dam across the Anadarche and Fourche Maline Creeks. It was intended primarily for recreational use. The lake has a surface area of 5,728 acres (23.18 km^{2}), a shoreline of 67 miles (108 km) and a capacity of 153,250 acre-feet. The dam was completed in 1937.

The original plans for the dam were developed by engineers from Oklahoma Agricultural & Mechanical College, now named Oklahoma State University (OSU). The WPA began constructing the dam in 1935. The structure was completed and turned over to the state on March 5, 1938.

The dam has a concrete core covered with earth and rock.

== Tucker Tower ==
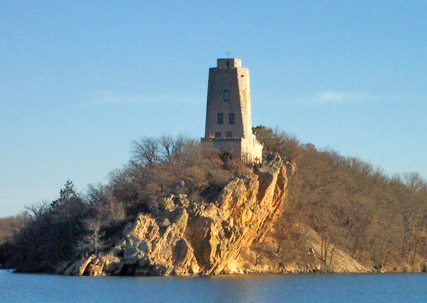
Dobbs Tower, on the southern shore of Lake Murray

Tucker Tower was originally intended as a summer residence for then-Gov. William H. "Alfalfa Bill" Murray, in return for his efforts to get the lake and state park situated in Southern Oklahoma. The design was based on photographs of a European castle that were taken by Fred Tucker, a veteran of World War I and an Oklahoma state senator, and for whom the structure is named. It is constructed of limestone that was quarried at the park site. The tower is five stories high with an observation deck on top. There is a two-story section that was intended as a living area. The interior was left unfinished when time and money ran out in 1935. No governor has ever spent a night there. Years later flooring and a spiral staircase were added to the tower section and the whole complex was turned into a museum.

The tower remained unfinished until the state park service stepped in and completed the construction. From the first-floor patio, the tower reaches 65 feet into the air, allowing a breath-taking view that encompasses miles in all directions. The patio itself is about 60 feet above lake level. The tower features one roofed and two open patios, a tree- and flower-lined walkway from the parking lot, a lake lookout along the path, and shaded benches from which to watch the birds and wildlife. During the summer, a variety of programs are presented at 1 and 4 p.m. daily.

Tucker Tower opened to the public in 1954 as a geological museum, featuring the granular hexahedrite meteorite found on the state park property in the 1930s. The meteorite remains on display in the tower, although the focus of the facility was changed to that of a nature center in 1981. The Lake Murray Meteorite, the largest of its kind ever found and the fifth largest in the world, was cut in half at the Institute of Meteorites in New Mexico, allowing a rare glimpse into the inside of the 90-million-year-old object. It is just one of the many exhibits at Tucker Tower Nature Center. Other displays include the reconstructed skull and fossilized bones of a mastodon found along the Washita River about 35 miles away; a mind-boggling animal skull collection, and educational exhibits of fossils, Lake Murray history, insects, fish and wildlife, legends, and rock specimens.

Tucker Tower was closed for a major renovation and reopened in 2013. The renovation, which included a 4,000 square feet (370 m^{2}) addition, cost about $3 million, was paid for by the park's oil and gas trust fund and public donations. The nature center has a classroom and exhibits of local geology, wildlife, and native inhabitants.

== Fees ==
To help fund a backlog of deferred maintenance and park improvements, the state implemented an entrance fee for this park and 21 others effective June 15, 2020. The fees, charged per vehicle, start at $10 per day for a single-day or $8 for residents with an Oklahoma license plate or Oklahoma tribal plate. Fees are waived for honorably discharged veterans and Oklahoma residents age 62 & older and their spouses. Passes good for three days or a week are also available; annual passes good at all 22 state parks charging fees are offered at a cost of $75 for out-of-state visitors or $60 for Oklahoma residents. The 22 parks are:

- Arrowhead Area at Lake Eufaula State Park
- Beavers Bend State Park
- Boiling Springs State Park
- Cherokee Landing State Park
- Fort Cobb State Park
- Foss State Park
- Honey Creek Area at Grand Lake State Park
- Great Plains State Park
- Great Salt Plains State Park
- Greenleaf State Park
- Keystone State Park
- Lake Eufaula State Park
- Lake Murray State Park
- Lake Texoma State Park
- Lake Thunderbird State Park
- Lake Wister State Park
- Natural Falls State Park
- Osage Hills State Park
- Robbers Cave State Park
- Sequoyah State Park
- Tenkiller State Park
- Twin Bridges Area at Grand Lake State Park

== National Register of Historic Places listing ==
LMPC became the first state park in Oklahoma to be listed on the National Register of Historic Places (NRHP). It was added to the list on October 12, 2001, with registration number NR 01001097. The application for registration stated that:

Lake Murray State Park is eligible for the National Register of Historic Places under Criteria A and C for its close association with a number of New Deal programs, as the largest, most intact Recreational Demonstration Area in Oklahoma, and as a designed landscape that reflects the National Park Service design philosophy for state and national parks. The park has had an enormous economic impact in the area, both historically and presently. It retains a high degree of integrity and accurately reflects the period of its planning and construction.

.

The applicable NRHP criteria are defined as follows:

Criterion A: "Property is associated with events that have made a significant contribution to the broad patterns of our history." Criterion C: "Property embodies the distinctive characteristics of a type, period, or method of construction or represents the work of a master, or possesses high artistic values, or represents a significant and distinguishable entity whose components lack individual distinction.

The application for NRHP listing identified 195 contributing resources for the district. The sheer size of the list precludes listing them all in this article, but they can be found on the original application. All of the significant resources within the proposed district boundaries were labeled as either "Contributing" or "non-contributing". Resources in the former category had to meet certain criteria:

- Built during the Period of Significance (defined as 1933 - 1942 for LMSP);
- Involved in some aspect of the park during that time;
- Had not lost their historical character through remodeling or conversion to other uses.

Non-contributing resources were usually those built less than 50 years before date of the listing on the NRHP.

The application also characterized the resources as follows:

Resources itemized for Lake Murray State Park Historic District
Resource Type	Contributing	Non-contributing
Buildings	131	88
Sites	1	0
Structures	47	23
Objects	16	1
Total	195	110

== Location ==
The lake can be reached via Interstate 35, Exit 24/29, then east two miles (3.2 km) on State Highway 77S. SH-77S completely encircles the lake and provides excellent access to all parts of the lake.

== Additional information ==
- National Register of Historic Places Registration Form. "Lake Murray State Park." NRHP Application.
- National Register Properties in Oklahoma: Lake Murray State Park"
