= Pump Back, Oklahoma =

- Census-designated place
- Location within Oklahoma Location within the United States
- Coordinates: 36°16′14″N 95°07′04″W
- Country: United States
- State: Oklahoma
- County: Mayes

Area
  - Total: 2.72 sq mi (7.04 km^{2})
  - Land: 2.07 sq mi (5.36 km^{2})
  - Water: 0.65 sq mi (1.68 km^{2})
- Elevation: 620 ft (190 m)

Population (2020)
  - Total: 160
  - Density: 77.3/sq mi (29.85/km^{2})
- Time zone: UTC-6 (Central (CST))
  - Summer (DST): UTC-5 (CDT)
- ZIP Code: 74365 (Salina)
- FIPS code: 40-61020
- GNIS feature ID: 2409110

Pump Back is a census-designated place (CDP) in Mayes County, Oklahoma, United States. The population was 160 at the 2020 census.

== Geography ==
Pump Back is in eastern Mayes County, 4 miles (6 km) southeast of Salina, which serves as the post office for the community. It is accessible from State Highway 82 and sits on both sides of Saline Creek between Lake Hudson and Lake W. R. Holway (a.k a. Chimney Rock Lake). It is bordered to the north by the Wickliffe CDP and to the northeast by the Kenwood CDP.

According to the U.S. Census Bureau, the Pump Back CDP has a total area of 2.72 square miles (7.04 km^{2}), of which 2.07 square miles (5.36 km^{2}) are land and 0.65 square miles (1.68 km^{2}), or 23.84%, are water.

== Demographics ==
Historical population
Census	Pop.	Note	%±
2000	155		—
2010	175		12.9%
2020	160		−8.6%
U.S. Decennial Census

=== 2020 census ===
As of the 2020 census, Pump Back had a population of 160. The median age was 36.1 years. 27.5% of residents were under the age of 18 and 8.8% of residents were 65 years of age or older. For every 100 females there were 105.1 males, and for every 100 females age 18 and over there were 141.7 males age 18 and over.

0.0% of residents lived in urban areas, while 100.0% lived in rural areas.

There were 57 households in Pump Back, of which 56.1% had children under the age of 18 living in them. Of all households, 59.6% were married-couple households, 10.5% were households with a male householder and no spouse or partner present, and 14.0% were households with a female householder and no spouse or partner present. About 10.5% of all households were made up of individuals and 1.8% had someone living alone who was 65 years of age or older.

There were 82 housing units, of which 30.5% were vacant. The homeowner vacancy rate was 4.3% and the rental vacancy rate was 0.0%.

Racial composition as of the 2020 census
Race	Number	Percent
White	93	58.1%
Black or African American	0	0.0%
American Indian and Alaska Native	37	23.1%
Asian	2	1.2%
Native Hawaiian and Other Pacific Islander	0	0.0%
Some other race	0	0.0%
Two or more races	28	17.5%
Hispanic or Latino (of any race)	5	3.1%

=== 2000 census ===
As of the census of 2000, there were 155 people, 64 households, and 49 families residing in the CDP. The population density was 73.9 inhabitants per square mile (28.5/km^{2}). There were 93 housing units at an average density of 44.4 per square mile (17.1/km^{2}). The racial makeup of the CDP was 69.03 percent White, 23.87 percent Native American, and 7.10 percent from two or more races. Hispanic or Latino of any race were 1.94 percent of the population.

There were 64 households, out of which 18.8 percent had children under the age of 18 living with them, 64.1 percent were married couples living together, 6.3 percent had a female householder with no husband present, and 23.4 percent were non-families. 20.3 percent of all households were made up of individuals, and 6.3 percent had someone living alone who was 65 years of age or older. The average household size was 2.42 and the average family size was 2.78.

In the CDP, the population was spread out, with 20.0 percent under the age of 18, 9.7 percent from 18 to 24, 11.6 percent from 25 to 44, 34.2 percent from 45 to 64, and 24.5 percent who were 65 years of age or older. The median age was 51 years. For every 100 females, there were 106.7 males. For every 100 females age 18 and over, there were 103.3 males.

The median income for a household in the CDP was $19,886, and the median income for a family was $27,679. Males had a median income of $36,429 versus $19,625 for females. The per capita income for the CDP was $14,448. About 34.9 percent of families and 40.3 percent of the population were below the poverty line, including 64.6 percent of those under the age of 18 and 10.3 percent of those 65 or over.

== Education ==
It is in the Salina Public Schools school district.
