= Salina Pumped Storage Project =

Dam near Salina, Oklahoma, U.S.

- Country: United States
- Location: Pump Back, Mayes County, near Salina, Oklahoma
- Coordinates: 36°15′55″N 95°06′15″W
- Status: Operational
- Owner(s): Grand River Dam Authority

Upper reservoir
- Creates: Lake W. R. Holway

Lower reservoir
- Creates: Lake Hudson

Power Station
- Turbines: 6
- Installed capacity: 260 MW (350,000 hp)

The Salina Pumped Storage Project is a 260-megawatt (350,000 hp) pumped-storage power station near Salina, Oklahoma. It is owned and operated by the Grand River Dam Authority (GRDA). Its construction was in response to growing power demands and a lack of dam sites on the Grand River. The first phase was completed in 1968 and the second in 1971. The upper reservoir for the power station is Lake W. R. Holway which was built on Saline Creek and the lower reservoir is Lake Hudson on the Grand River. During periods of lower power demand, water is pumped from Lake Hudson to Lake Holway and released back down through the pump-generators during periods of high energy demand.

== Design philosophy ==
The process essentially consists of pumping water from a lower elevation into a containment at a higher elevation. In this step, the mechanical device used to move the water acts like a conventional pump to lift the water. External power, in this case an electric motor, supplies the needed energy. Later, the external power is switched off and water flows backward through the device, enabling it to function as a hydraulic turbine generating energy to drive an electric power generator. Ideally, the power generated would offset the power consumed in elevating the water. In practice, there are inefficiencies in the system that cause the power consumed raising the water to significantly exceed the energy generated during the reversal of water flow. GRDA has stated that pumping water from Lake Hudson (the source) into Lake W. R. Holway (the receiver) consumes nearly twice the power that can be recovered from the hydraulic generator. The real benefit from the process is that the owner can use power for pumping when overall power demand from customers is lower, and supply electric power when customer demand is higher. It is an effective way to provide peaking power because the system can be brought on line (or taken off line) very quickly.

== Construction ==
The project was constructed in two stages:

Stage 1 consisted of building an earth and rock filled dam in Chimney Rock Hollow 185 feet (56 m) high, creating Chimney Rock Reservoir. A canal 1,850 feet (560 m) long led from the dam to a forebay structure that had openings for steel penstocks, each 14 feet (4.3 m) in diameter. Three penstocks led from the forebay to a powerhouse that housed three 64,000 horsepower (48,000 kW) horsepower pump-generators, with a total rated capacity of 130 megawatts (170,000 hp). This stage was completed in 1968.

Stage 2 comprised building three more penstocks, extending the powerhouse and adding three more pump-generators, all identical to those installed in Stage 1. This doubled the facility's capacity to 260 mw. It was completed in 1971.

The SPSP is controlled remotely from the GRDA Energy Control Center at the Robert S. Kerr Dam, which created Lake Hudson.

In 1981, Chimney Rock Reservoir was renamed Lake W. R. Holway, in honor of a noted consulting engineer who had been responsible for engineering several important projects in Oklahoma, including the SPSP.

== Effects of drought on operation ==
Severe drought in 2005 greatly reduced runoff in the entire Grand River watershed. This caused levels of the reservoirs along the river to fall. In particular, the water level of Lake Hudson dropped to 615 feet (187 m) by January 2006. The SPSP agreement with the Federal Energy Regulatory Commission (FERC) requires that Lake Hudson elevation be a minimum of 619 feet (189 m) in order to pump water into Lake W. R. Holway. This required GRDA to lower Grand Lake by 48,200 acre-feet (59,500,000 m^{3}).
