= Disney/Little Blue State Park =

State park in Oklahoma, United States

- Location within Oklahoma
- Location: Mayes County, Oklahoma, Oklahoma, United States
- Nearest city: Disney, Oklahoma
- Coordinates: 36°29′31″N 95°00′11″W
- Area: 32-acre (130,000 m^{2})
- Established: 1939
- Operator: Oklahoma Department of Tourism and Recreation
- Open: Year-round
- Website: https://www.travelok.com/state-parks/little-blue-area-at-grand-lake-state-park

Disney/Little Blue State Park is a 32-acre (130,000 m^{2}) Oklahoma state park located near the town of Disney, Oklahoma, in Mayes County, Oklahoma. The park lies adjacent to the east spillway of Pensacola Dam on Grand Lake o' the Cherokees and is part of the Grand Lake State Park system. It is known for fishing, swimming, camping, and water recreation, and provides access to Little Blue Creek and Grand Lake.

== History ==
The park was established following the construction of Pensacola Dam, which was completed in 1940 by the Grand River Dam Authority to create Grand Lake o' the Cherokees. The town of Disney developed during dam construction in 1939 as a settlement for workers and visitors. The state park was later designated to offer recreational opportunities near the spillway and lake.

== Geography ==
Disney/Little Blue State Park is located in northeastern Oklahoma within Mayes County, Oklahoma, approximately 105 kilometers (65 miles) from Tulsa. It lies along Oklahoma State Highway 28, two blocks east of Disney, near the east spillway of Pensacola Dam. The park features wooded areas, rolling hills, and a shallow, spring-fed creek with clear water suitable for wading and swimming.

== Amenities ==
The park offers primitive camping sites shaded by mature trees, picnic tables, grills, and group shelters. Comfort stations with restrooms and showers are available, along with a lighted boat ramp for lake access. A playground is provided for children. The park is open year-round, and pets are permitted on leashes.

== Recreation ==
Visitors engage in fishing for species such as largemouth bass, catfish, crappie, bluegill, and seasonal sand bass runs. Boating and water sports are popular due to the park’s proximity to Grand Lake, with facilities for skiing, wakeboarding, and kayaking. The shallow creek area is favored for swimming, particularly by families with young children. Primitive camping under tree cover offers a rustic experience. Nearby attractions include Hogan's Off-Road Park, Pensacola Dam tours, and other areas of Grand Lake State Park such as Bernice State Park and Cherokee Area.

== Wildlife and Environment ==
The park supports wildlife including White-tailed deer, raccoons, and numerous bird species. Its creek and lake habitats provide spawning grounds for fish and seasonal waterfowl. Conservation practices are encouraged to maintain water quality and protect natural resources.

== Management ==
Disney/Little Blue State Park is managed by the Oklahoma Department of Tourism and Recreation as part of the Grand Lake State Park system. Park rangers are present on weekends, and reservations for group shelters can be made through the state’s tourism office.

== See also ==
Grand Lake o' the Cherokees Pensacola Dam List of Oklahoma state parks
