= W. R. Holway =

American civil engineer

- Born: April 29, 1893; Sandwich, Massachusetts
- Died: April 23, 1981 (aged 87); Tulsa, Oklahoma
- Occupation: Civil engineer
- Spouse: Frances Hope Kerr
- Children: William Nye "Bill" Holway; Donald K. Holway

William Rea Holway (April 29, 1893 – April 23, 1981), commonly known as W. R. Holway, was an American civil engineer who became prominent in Oklahoma. He is best known for his work on major water supply projects for the city of Tulsa, and on the Pensacola Dam at Grand Lake o' the Cherokees.

Holway came to Tulsa in 1918, where he became the city waterworks engineer. In 1920, he was hired as a consulting engineer to plan a pipeline to carry water from Lake Spavinaw to Tulsa. He founded the firm W. R. Holway and Associates in 1922. Holway was chief engineer for the Pensacola Dam, which created the Grand Lake o' the Cherokees on the Grand River (the lower Neosho River), in northeastern Oklahoma. Construction began in 1938 and was completed in 1940. At the time, this was the longest multiple-arch dam in the world. In 1952, W. R. Holway and Associates was the engineering firm that built Lake Eucha, which functions as additional storage and as a buffer for Lake Spavinaw.

He and his family also contributed to other aspects of Tulsa's development. In 1922, he was a co-founder of All Souls Unitarian Church, with Richard Lloyd Jones, owner of the Tulsa Tribune, In 1922, his wife founded the Tulsa Little Theater, which was later renamed Theatre Tulsa. Years later, after All Souls had become the largest Unitarian church in the United States, Hope Holway was honored when the Hope Unitarian Universalist Church was named for her. Both of their sons became engineers and joined their father's consulting firm.

== Early life ==
Holway was born in Sandwich, Massachusetts, to Jerome Holway and Ella Francis Ellis on April 29, 1893. He graduated from the Massachusetts Institute of Technology (MIT) in 1916 with a Bachelor of Science degree in civil engineering and married Frances Hope Kerr on July 28, 1916.

== Engineering career ==
Holway's first jobs were as assistant engineer in Providence, Rhode Island, and then as engineer for a waterworks plant in Alliance, Ohio. These were apparently uneventful, and the Holways moved to Tulsa in 1918.

In 1918, W. R. became a city waterworks engineer for Tulsa, in charge of a water treatment plant that filtered silt from the Arkansas River water that was then distributed for residential use. The filtration plant never performed as designed. He recommended that the city spend no more money trying to make the Arkansas water potable because it also had a higher salt content than sea water. He then went into business for himself on a paving project in nearby Sand Springs. He founded the firm W. R. Holway and Associates in 1922.

=== Spavinaw project ===
Civic leaders had long realized that the Arkansas River was an unreliable source for Tulsa's water supply. Starting in 1908, they studied many different approaches to solving the water supply problem. One study concluded that Spavinaw Creek could provide ample water that could flow by gravity at least as far as Catoosa, Oklahoma. They had decided to build a reservoir on Spavinaw Creek, a tributary of the Neosho River, over fifty miles northeast of Tulsa. Holway was selected as chief engineer for this project in 1920. He is credited with designing a 55-mile-long (89 km) pipeline that could carry water to Lake Yahola in Tulsa using a gravity flow system alone. The line became operational in 1924, and was the longest such line in the U. S. at that time. The construction was not simple. Holway had to build railroad and telephone lines from Tulsa, where the 60-inch-diameter (1.5 m) and 84-inch-diameter (2.1 m) pipes were made, to the dam site.

Engineering issues were not the only problems Holway faced. The Ku Klux Klan had become a powerful political force in Oklahoma by the 1920s. While Holway was assembling a 40-man team to oversee the Spavinaw project, three representatives of the Klan confronted him to demand that he fire three Roman Catholics. He refused to do so, even though he recognized one Klansman as his own banker. Knowing the Klan's reputation for violence, he thereafter kept a loaded weapon handy, even strapping it to the steering wheel of his car.

The Spavinaw system exceeded the original design requirements, which called for meeting Tulsa's water needs for 25 years. It actually could deliver 60 million gallons per day by gravity flow. Pumps and a second pipeline were added much later, to meet peak summertime consumption. By 2009, Tulsa still received over half of its water from the system Holway designed.

=== Pensacola Dam project ===
The Grand River Dam Authority selected Holway as the chief engineer for the Pensacola Dam (also known as Grand River Dam) project. This dam would create the Grand Lake o' the Cherokees in northeastern Oklahoma on the lower Neosho River. Construction began in 1938 and was completed in 1941. At the time, this was the longest multiple-arch dam in the world.

=== Lake Eucha ===
In 1952, Lake Eucha was created by completion of the Eucha dam upstream from Lake Spavinaw. It functions as additional storage and as a buffer for Lake Spavinaw. W. R. Holway and Associates was in charge of engineering work for this project.

== Personal life ==
As a boy, Holway was baptized in the West Barnstable Congregational Church. He earned money by delivering milk, herding cows and working in his father's livery stable. He graduated from Sandwich Academy, attended Dartmouth College and Massachusetts Institute of Technology. While in high school, W. R. fell in love with Hope Kerr, who was seven years older than he. She had graduated from Radcliffe College in 1910, then came to Sandwich to teach school. They married July 28, 1916, right after he had graduated from MIT.

Both of Holway's sons also graduated from MIT with a degree in civil engineering and joined their father in W. R. Holway and Associates. William Nye "Bill" Holway (1920–2007) succeeded his father as president of the consulting firm, which later was acquired by The Benham Group of Oklahoma City. Donal Kerr Holway (1917–2009) also spent his career in the family firm. The family firm continued to play a role in variety of water and power projects in the area.

Frances Hope Kerr Holway (1886 - 1968) worked in her husband's engineering firm, becoming a full partner who was responsible for personnel and office management. A native of New York, she earned an AB degree from Radcliffe College in 1910. She was also a published author, whose works included: Early Teachers of the South and West, 1820-1865, (2 volumes), The Story of Water, The Holway-Kerr Family Book, Radicals of Yesterday, and History of All Souls Unitarian Church of Tulsa: 1921-1971. After moving to Tulsa with her husband, she founded the Tulsa Little Theater in 1922, and served as its president for several years. She died in Tulsa on August 27, 1968. Her papers are in the Arthur and Elizabeth Schlesinger Library on the History of Women in America at Harvard University.

Holway died in Tulsa on April 23, 1981.

== Legacy ==
In 1921, W. R. Holway was a co-founder of All Souls Unitarian Church in Tulsa. The church later grew to become the largest congregation in the Unitarian Universalist Association, and Holway's son Bill was instrumental in the founding of a spinoff UU church in south Tulsa, that is named Hope Unitarian Universalist Church. W. R. Holway's grandson, Bill Hamilton-Holway, is co-minister of the Unitarian Universalist Church of Berkeley with his wife, Barbara.

Lake W. R. Holway, also known as W. R. Holway Reservoir and formerly known as Chimney Rock Reservoir, was named for this man. It is northwest of the town of Locust Grove, Oklahoma.
