= Wickliffe, Oklahoma =

- Census-designated place
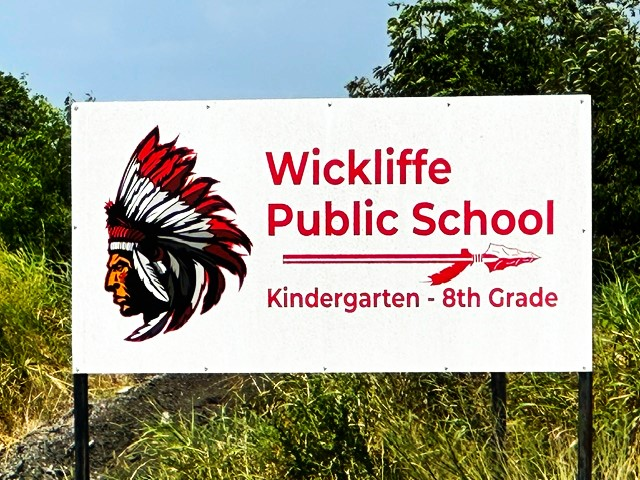
- Highway sign pointing toward Wickliffe and the School, August of 2026

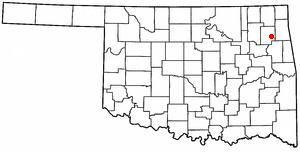
- Location in Oklahoma
- Coordinates: 36°18′24″N 95°08′07″W
- Country: United States
- State: Oklahoma
- County: Mayes

Area
  - Total: 9.33 sq mi (24.2 km^{2})
  - Land: 9.33 sq mi (24.2 km^{2})
  - Water: 0.00 sq mi (0 km^{2})
- Elevation: 889 ft (271 m)

Population (2020)
  - Total: 1,026
  - Density: 109.3/sq mi (42.22/km^{2})
- Time zone: UTC-6 (Central (CST))
  - Summer (DST): UTC-5 (CDT)
- ZIP Code: 74365 (Salina)
- FIPS code: 40-80975
- GNIS feature ID: 2409591

Wickliffe is a census-designated place (CDP) in Mayes County, Oklahoma, United States. The population was 1,026 at the 2020 census.

== Geography ==
Wickliffe is in eastern Mayes County, bordered to the southwest by the town of Salina, to the south by Pump Back, and to the southeast by Kenwood. The community's boundaries expanded greatly between the 2010 and 2020 censuses, from an area of 1.2 square miles (3.1 km^{2}) in 2010 to 9.33 square miles (24.16 km^{2}), all land, in 2020.

State Highways 20 and 82 run concurrently through Wickliffe, leading southwest into Salina and northeast 10 miles (16 km) to Spavinaw.

== Demographics ==
Historical population
Census	Pop.	Note	%±
2000	99		—
2010	75		−24.2%
2020	1,026		1,268.0%
U.S. Decennial Census

=== 2020 census ===
As of the 2020 census, Wickliffe had a population of 1,026. The median age was 44.3 years. 25.0% of residents were under the age of 18 and 20.0% of residents were 65 years of age or older. For every 100 females there were 105.6 males, and for every 100 females age 18 and over there were 108.7 males age 18 and over.

0.0% of residents lived in urban areas, while 100.0% lived in rural areas.

There were 385 households in Wickliffe, of which 26.2% had children under the age of 18 living in them. Of all households, 57.9% were married-couple households, 18.4% were households with a male householder and no spouse or partner present, and 19.0% were households with a female householder and no spouse or partner present. About 21.1% of all households were made up of individuals and 8.4% had someone living alone who was 65 years of age or older.

There were 422 housing units, of which 8.8% were vacant. The homeowner vacancy rate was 0.0% and the rental vacancy rate was 0.0%.

Racial composition as of the 2020 census
Race	Number	Percent
White	456	44.4%
Black or African American	4	0.4%
American Indian and Alaska Native	382	37.2%
Asian	0	0.0%
Native Hawaiian and Other Pacific Islander	0	0.0%
Some other race	1	0.1%
Two or more races	183	17.8%
Hispanic or Latino (of any race)	21	2.0%

=== 2000 census ===
As of the census of 2000, there were 99 people, 34 households, and 29 families residing in the CDP. The population density was 85.4 inhabitants per square mile (33.0/km^{2}). There were 37 housing units at an average density of 31.9 per square mile (12.3/km^{2}). The racial makeup of the CDP was 49.49% White, 41.41% Native American, 1.01% Asian, and 8.08% from two or more races.

There were 34 households, out of which 55.9% had children under the age of 18 living with them, 67.6% were married couples living together, 2.9% had a female householder with no husband present, and 14.7% were non-families. 14.7% of all households were made up of individuals, and 8.8% had someone living alone who was 65 years of age or older. The average household size was 2.91 and the average family size was 3.24.

In the CDP, the population was spread out, with 35.4% under the age of 18, 9.1% from 18 to 24, 25.3% from 25 to 44, 18.2% from 45 to 64, and 12.1% who were 65 years of age or older. The median age was 30 years. For every 100 females, there were 106.3 males. For every 100 females age 18 and over, there were 120.7 males.

The median income for a household in the CDP was $26,964, and the median income for a family was $40,625. Males had a median income of $35,833 versus $16,250 for females. The per capita income for the CDP was $11,097. There were 19.5% of families and 12.8% of the population living below the poverty line, including 17.0% of under eighteens and none of those over 64.

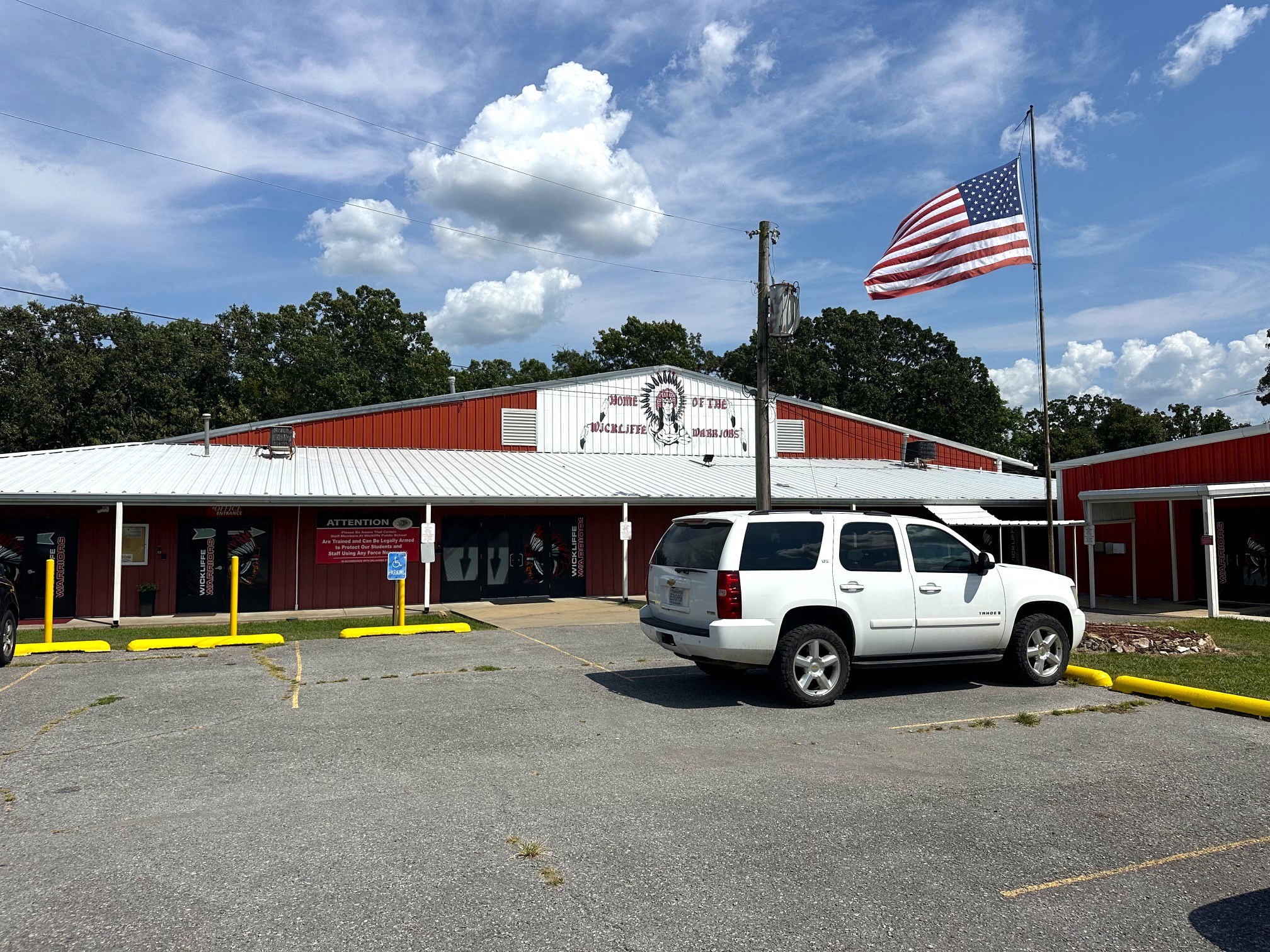
Wickliffe Public School in August of 2026

== Education ==
The CDP is divided between the Wickliffe Public School elementary school district and the Salina Public Schools school district.
