= Lake W. R. Holway =

Lake W. R. Holway Dam
- Location of Lake W. R. Holway
- Country: United States
- Location: Mayes County, Oklahoma
- Coordinates: 36°15′10″N 95°05′55″W
- Construction began: 1968
- Opening date: 1968

Dam and spillways
- Type of dam: earth and rock
- Elevation at crest: 200 ft (61 m)

Reservoir
- Creates: Lake W. R. Holway (Chimney Rock Lake)
- Total capacity: 50,372 acre⋅ft (62,133,000 m^{3})
- Surface area: 762 acres (308 ha)
- Maximum water depth: 182 ft (55 m)
- Normal elevation: 865 ft (264 m)

Lake W. R. Holway, or Chimney Rock Lake is a reservoir in Mayes County, Oklahoma on the Saline Creek arm of Lake Hudson (Oklahoma). It was created in 1968 by the Grand River Dam Authority (GRDA) as an integral part of the Salina Pumped Storage Project. It is northeast of Locust Grove and southeast of Salina, Oklahoma. Originally named Chimney Rock Lake, it was renamed in 1981 to honor W. R. Holway, the consulting engineer who was responsible for constructing the Spavinaw Water Project, Pensacola Dam, and other important projects. Its primary purpose is peak power generation.

The lake covers 712 acres (288 ha)?(link now dead and conflicts with below!) and has a shoreline of 21 miles (34 km).

A hydrographic survey of the lake in 2009 resulted in the following dimensions for the normal lake at an elevation of 865 feet (264 m):

- Area 762 acres (308 ha)
- Volume 50,372 acre-feet (62,133,000 m^{3})
- Mean depth 66.1 feet (20.1 m)
- Maximum depth 182 feet (55 m).

== Public usage ==
This lake is also a popular location for fishing, especially for bass, crappie and catfish. GRDA prohibits swimming and the use of internal combustion engines on the reservoir.
