= Gideon, Oklahoma =

Unincorporated community in Oklahoma, US

- Census-designated place
- Location within Oklahoma
- Coordinates: 36°0′04″N 94°59′48″W
- Country: United States
- State: Oklahoma
- County: Cherokee

Area
  - Total: 6.31 sq mi (16.34 km^{2})
  - Land: 6.31 sq mi (16.34 km^{2})
  - Water: 0 sq mi (0.00 km^{2})
- Elevation: 814 ft (248 m)

Population (2020)
  - Total: 229
  - Density: 36.3/sq mi (14.01/km^{2})
- Time zone: UTC-6 (Central (CST))
  - Summer (DST): UTC-5 (CST)
- FIPS code: 40-29300
- GNIS feature ID: 2584380

Gideon is an unincorporated community and census-designated place (CDP) in Cherokee County, Oklahoma, United States. As of the 2020 census, Gideon had a population of 229.

== Geography ==
Gideon is located northwest of the center of Cherokee County along Oklahoma State Highway 82. Tahlequah, the Cherokee County seat, is 9 miles (14 km) to the southeast, and Locust Grove is 16 miles (26 km) to the northwest.

According to the United States Census Bureau, the Gideon CDP has a total area of 1.2 square miles (3.1 km^{2}), all land.

== Demographics ==
Historical population
Census	Pop.	Note	%±
2010	49		—
2020	229		367.3%
U.S. Decennial Census

=== 2020 census ===
As of the 2020 census, Gideon had a population of 229. The median age was 39.9 years. 19.2% of residents were under the age of 18 and 10.0% of residents were 65 years of age or older. For every 100 females there were 100.9 males, and for every 100 females age 18 and over there were 117.6 males age 18 and over.

0.0% of residents lived in urban areas, while 100.0% lived in rural areas.

There were 86 households in Gideon, of which 39.5% had children under the age of 18 living in them. Of all households, 55.8% were married-couple households, 20.9% were households with a male householder and no spouse or partner present, and 15.1% were households with a female householder and no spouse or partner present. About 21.0% of all households were made up of individuals and 10.5% had someone living alone who was 65 years of age or older.

There were 96 housing units, of which 10.4% were vacant. The homeowner vacancy rate was 0.0% and the rental vacancy rate was 0.0%.

Racial composition as of the 2020 census
Race	Number	Percent
White	92	40.2%
Black or African American	4	1.7%
American Indian and Alaska Native	99	43.2%
Asian	0	0.0%
Native Hawaiian and Other Pacific Islander	0	0.0%
Some other race	5	2.2%
Two or more races	29	12.7%
Hispanic or Latino (of any race)	8	3.5%

=== 2010 census ===
As of the 2010 census, Gideon had a population of 49.
