= Cherokee State Park (Oklahoma) =

State park in Oklahoma, United States

- Location within Oklahoma
- Location: Mayes County, Oklahoma, United States
- Nearest city: Disney, Oklahoma
- Coordinates: 36°28′49″N 95°03′03″W
- Area: 43 acres (170,000 m^{2})
- Website: Cherokee Area at Grand Lake State Park

Cherokee State Park is a 43-acre (170,000 m^{2}) Oklahoma state park located in Mayes County, Oklahoma. It is located near the city of Disney, Oklahoma. Cherokee State Park is located in northeastern Oklahoma on the west shore of Grand Lake o' the Cherokees, one of Oklahoma's largest lakes with over 59,000 acres (240 km^{2}) and 1,300 miles (2,100 km) of shoreline. The park consists of several smaller parks that are located near the Pensacola Dam and around the lake. The area is known for great fishing and a variety of water sports. Amenities include picnic sites, a group shelter, campsites, playgrounds, comfort stations, lighted boat ramp and a 9-hole golf course.

The lakeside area features a beach for swimming, 12 RV sites, 15 tent sites, a playground, group shelter and comfort station. The Grand View area features four RV sites with electric service only, 45 tent sites, a group shelter and comfort station. The Riverside area, located below the Pensacola Dam, features 18 RV sites, 50 tent sites, a group shelter, boat ramp with access to the river and a comfort station. The Grand Cherokee area, also located below the Pensacola Dam, features 15 RV sites with full hookups and pull-through services.
