= Locust Grove High School =

Locust Grove High School may refer to:

- Locust Grove High School (Georgia), a public high school in Locust Grove, Georgia, United States
- Locust Grove High School (Oklahoma), a public high school in Locust Grove, Oklahoma
