= Disney, Oklahoma =

- Town
- Nickname: "Disney Island"
- Location within Oklahoma Location within the United States
- Coordinates: 36°28′37″N 95°01′10″W
- Country: United States
- State: Oklahoma
- County: Mayes
- Founded: November 12, 1939; 87 years ago
- Named for: Wesley E. Disney

Area
  - Total: 1.42 sq mi (3.67 km^{2})
  - Land: 1.24 sq mi (3.21 km^{2})
  - Water: 0.18 sq mi (0.46 km^{2})
- Elevation: 742 ft (226 m)

Population (2020)
  - Total: 222
  - Density: 179.2/sq mi (69.19/km^{2})
- Time zone: UTC-6 (Central (CST))
  - Summer (DST): UTC-5 (CDT)
- ZIP Code: 74340
- Area codes: 539/918
- FIPS code: 40-20900
- GNIS feature ID: 2412434
- Website: www.disney-ok.com

Disney is a town in Mayes County, Oklahoma, United States. The population was 222 at the 2020 census, down from 311 in 2010. The town is named for former Oklahoma U.S. Congressman Wesley E. Disney and has no affiliation with The Walt Disney Company or Walt Disney.

== Geography ==
Disney is in the northeastern corner of Mayes County, on the south shore of the Grand Lake o' the Cherokees, a reservoir on the Neosho River. The town is sometimes referred to as "Disney Island" due to its situation between the east end of the Pensacola Dam, the main dam which forms the lake, and two smaller spillways on the lake to the east. The northern part of Disney is lake-front, while the southern part is roughly bounded by Summerfield Creek, fed by the spillways from the two eastern dams.

Oklahoma State Highway 28 passes through the town, leading west across the Pensacola Dam 2 miles (3 km) to Langley. The town of Jay is 17 miles (27 km) to the east via highways 28 and 20.

According to the U.S. Census Bureau, the town of Disney has a total area of 1.42 square miles (3.68 km^{2}), of which 1.24 square miles (3.21 km^{2}) are land and 0.18 square miles (0.47 km^{2}), or 12.62%, are water.

Disney has a herd of "island deer" that, while wild and not kept in an enclosure, act more like dogs, strolling across Main Street (Hwy 28) and nibbling on lawns, shrubs, and flowers.

Disney's growth is limited by the size of the island and the technical difficulties with bringing municipal services across the dams, so Disney has its own water plant, no public sewer system (all septic), and no natural gas service to houses.

There is a convenience store, a bait shop, a post office, a marina, and two drive-ins. There are also offices for construction firms, a gift shop, two churches, and a church camp facility.

Sections of the town are designated as Grand Lake State Park under three divisions: Cherokee to the West, Disney in the center, and Little Blue to the southeast. These areas are popular recreation spots in the town, supplying campsites, boat slips, and access to swimming, hiking, and off-roading.

The Picture in Scripture Amphitheater is 4 miles (6 km) east of town, and on Fridays and Saturdays for several weeks during the summer it presents the story of the apostle Paul.

== History ==
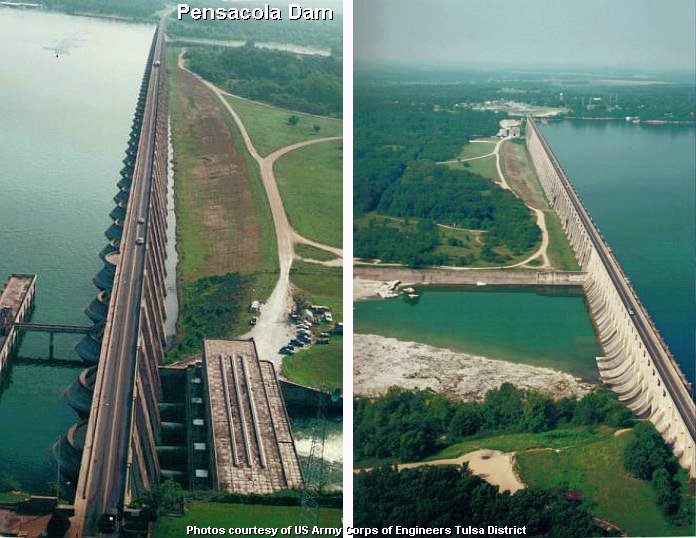
The Pensacola Dam

Disney was founded on November 12, 1939, by a land developer named C.D. Armstrong, who saw the area as a potential 'resort center of the Midwest.' A U.S. Post Office was established on May 21, 1938, and dedicated to the U.S. Congressman Wesley E. Disney.

After Cherokee Nation member Henry Holderman led a successful campaign advocating for local hydroelectric energy, the Oklahoma legislature formed the Grand River Dam Authority (GRDA) in 1935. In 1938, construction began on the Pensacola Dam, which would connect the towns of Langley and Disney. A by-product of the Second New Deal, the dam was a project of the Works Progress Administration (WPA), a New Deal agency focused on work relief during the Great Depression.

During the dam's construction, Disney became a boomtown. Hundreds of construction workers, businessmen, engineers, and truck drivers, along with all the services a large workforce would require, were based in the town.

The historic Dam Hotel was built in 1938 as a boutique hotel to serve workers and guests during this time. To quarter the project's superintendents, ten WPA-era stone cabins were constructed at the east edge of the town. These have since been converted into a functional motel and can be rented by tourists.

In the October 1938 issue of Scribner's magazine, famed artist Thomas Hart Benton wrote and illustrated an article about Disney, titled "Thirty-Six Hours in a Boom Town".

A dam construction worker, William J. Morrow, built the first church in Disney.

The town was incorporated on March 19, 1959. In 1960, the population was 224. In 1980, the population peaked at 464.

== Demographics ==
Historical population
Census	Pop.	Note	%±
1960	224		—
1970	303		35.3%
1980	464		53.1%
1990	257		−44.6%
2000	226		−12.1%
2010	311		37.6%
2020	222		−28.6%
U.S. Decennial Census

=== 2020 census ===
As of the 2020 census, Disney had a population of 222. The median age was 54.8 years. 18.5% of residents were under the age of 18 and 29.7% of residents were 65 years of age or older. For every 100 females there were 96.5 males, and for every 100 females age 18 and over there were 94.6 males age 18 and over.

0.0% of residents lived in urban areas, while 100.0% lived in rural areas.

There were 101 households in Disney, of which 20.8% had children under the age of 18 living in them. Of all households, 41.6% were married-couple households, 21.8% were households with a male householder and no spouse or partner present, and 26.7% were households with a female householder and no spouse or partner present. About 30.7% of all households were made up of individuals and 17.8% had someone living alone who was 65 years of age or older.

There were 176 housing units, of which 42.6% were vacant. The homeowner vacancy rate was 3.5% and the rental vacancy rate was 4.8%.

Racial composition as of the 2020 census
Race	Number	Percent
White	136	61.3%
Black or African American	0	0.0%
American Indian and Alaska Native	58	26.1%
Asian	1	0.5%
Native Hawaiian and Other Pacific Islander	0	0.0%
Some other race	2	0.9%
Two or more races	25	11.3%
Hispanic or Latino (of any race)	7	3.2%

=== 2010 census ===
As of the 2010 census Disney had a population of 311. The racial and ethnic composition of the population was 73.0% white, 17.0% Native American, 0.3% from some other race, 9.6% reporting two or more races and 0.6% Hispanic or Latino from any race.

=== 2000 census ===
As of the census of 2000, there were 226 people, 124 households, and 56 families residing in the town. The population density was 175.6 inhabitants per square mile (67.8/km^{2}). There were 252 housing units at an average density of 195.8 per square mile (75.6/km^{2}). The racial makeup of the town was 80.53% White, 0.44% African American, 9.29% Native American, and 9.73% from two or more races. Hispanic or Latino of any race were 0.44% of the population.

There were 124 households, out of which 10.5% had children under the age of 18 living with them, 38.7% were married couples living together, 4.8% had a female householder with no husband present, and 54.8% were non-families. 46.8% of all households were made up of individuals, and 28.2% had someone living alone who was 65 years of age or older. The average household size was 1.82 and the average family size was 2.59.

In the town, the population was spread out, with 14.6% under the age of 18, 5.3% from 18 to 24, 24.8% from 25 to 44, 27.0% from 45 to 64, and 28.3% who were 65 years of age or older. The median age was 49 years. For every 100 females, there were 89.9 males. For every 100 females age 18 and over, there were 85.6 males.

The median income for a household in the town was $25,417, and the median income for a family was $36,875. Males had a median income of $36,250 versus $25,750 for females. The per capita income for the town was $16,975. About 21.4% of families and 24.8% of the population were below the poverty line, including 20.6% of those under the age of 18 and 21.3% of those 65 or over.

== Education ==
It is in the Jay Public Schools school district.
