= Oklahoma State Highway 100 =

Highway in Oklahoma

State Highway 100

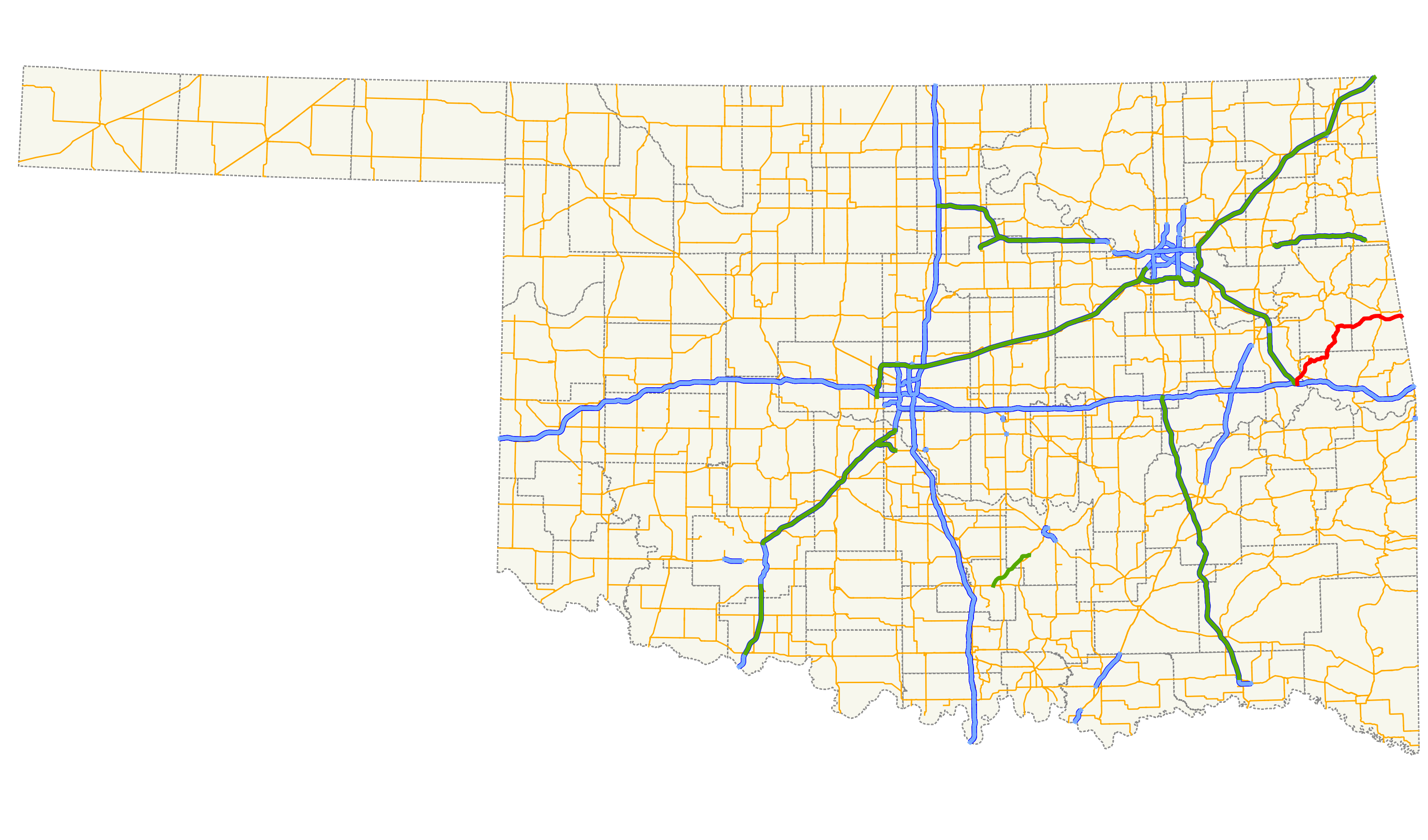

Route information
- Maintained by ODOT
- Length: 54.9 mi (88.4 km)
- Existed: June 7, 1954–present

Major junctions
- West end: I-40 south of Webbers Falls
- US 64 from Webbers Falls to Gore; US 59 in Stilwell
- East end: AR 156 at the Arkansas state line near Evansville, AR

Location
- Country: United States
- State: Oklahoma

Highway system
- Oklahoma State Highway System; Interstate; US; State; Turnpikes
← SH-99	→ SH-101

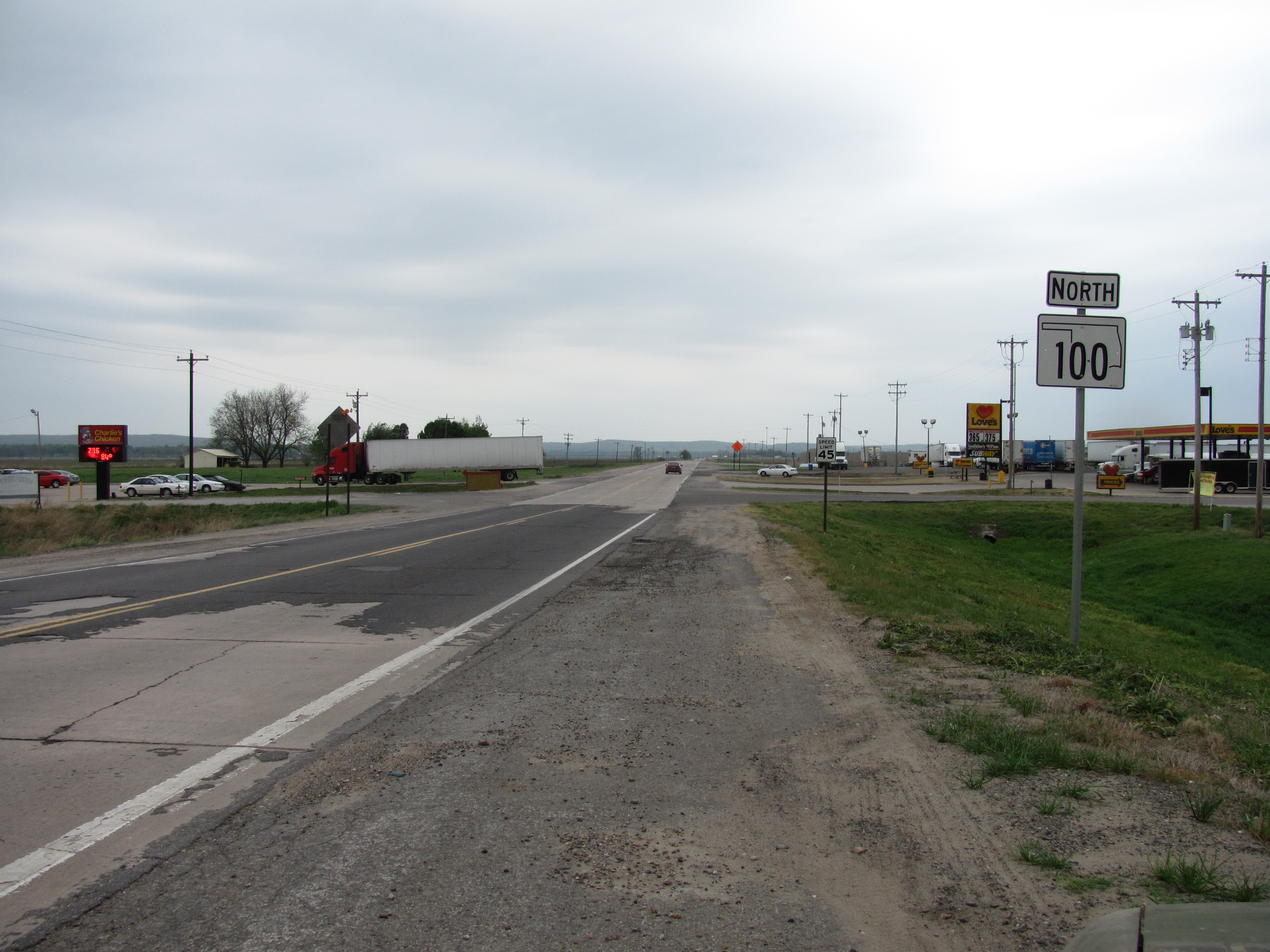
Northbound in Webbers Falls, Oklahoma

State Highway 100 (abbreviated SH-100 or OK-100) is a 54.9-mile (88.4 km) long (88.4 km) state highway in eastern Oklahoma. It connects Interstate 40 with the Arkansas state line near Stilwell. It has no lettered spur routes.

== Route description ==
SH-100 begins at I-40 Exit 287. It heads north to meet US-64 in Webbers Falls, and overlaps it until Gore. In the Gore area, it has a brief overlap with State Highway 10 as well. After Gore, it splits off on its own and heads roughly northeast. It meets State Highway 10A near Lake Tenkiller, where it turns due east. Near Box, it meets State Highway 82, where it turns north and overlaps.

After 13 miles (21 km) concurrent with SH-82, SH-100 splits off on its own and heads eastward, meeting US-59 1 mile (1.6 km) south of Stilwell. It then crosses the state line into Arkansas, becoming Arkansas Highway 156.

== History ==
SH-100 was first added to the highway system on June 7, 1954. Originally, the highway began south of the Standing Rock Bridge and headed north to end at the city limits of Stilwell. It was twice extended in 1956; on June 4 of that year, the route's eastern terminus was brought to the Arkansas state line. However, SH-100 and SH-51 shared a wrong-way concurrency through Stilwell, and SH-100 used the present-day routing of SH-51 east of that town. On November 19, 1956, the route's western terminus was moved to SH-10 near Gore.

By 1970, Interstate 40 had been built through Muskogee County, and on June 1, 1970, SH-100 was extended along US-64 to its present-day western terminus. The final major change in the highway's routing was on August 9, 1971, when it was switched with SH-51 east of Stilwell, establishing its current eastern terminus. Since then, only minor relocations have taken place.

The section of SH-100 west of Gore was pressed into service as a detour for I-40 traffic after the collapse of its bridge over the Arkansas River on May 26, 2002. The detour significantly impacted the town of Gore. Local firefighters directed traffic there 24 hours a day, with daytime temperatures approaching 100 °F (38 °C). Businesses in Gore reported loss of revenue due to the traffic; one gas station reported a 30% decline in revenue while traffic was detoured through town. Delays of thirty to fifty minutes on the 12-mile (19 km) detour were typical, although trains passing through Gore could lengthen wait times by 15 minutes.

== Junction list ==
County	Location	mi	km	Destinations	Notes
Muskogee		0.0	0.0	I-40	Western terminus
Muskogee	Webbers Falls	1.7	2.7	US 64 west	West end of US 64 concurrency
Sequoyah	Gore	4.1	6.6	US 64 east / SH-10 south	East end of US 64 concurrency West end of SH-10 concurrency
Sequoyah	Gore	4.4	7.1	SH-10 north	East end of SH-10 concurrency
Sequoyah		10.3	16.6	SH-10A	Eastern terminus of SH-10A
Sequoyah		16.1	25.9	SH-82 south	South end of SH-82 concurrency
Cherokee		29.7	47.8	SH-82 north	North end of SH-82 concurrency
Adair		46.8	75.3	US 59 north	North end of US 59 concurrency
Adair		47.3	76.1	US 59 south	South end of US 59 concurrency
Adair		54.9	88.4	AR 156	Arkansas state line; eastern terminus
1.000 mi = 1.609 km; 1.000 km = 0.621 mi: Concurrency terminus
