= Kenwood, Oklahoma =

- Census-designated place
- Location within Oklahoma Location within the United States
- Coordinates: 36°18′04″N 94°59′52″W
- Country: United States
- State: Oklahoma
- Counties: Delaware, Mayes

Area
  - Total: 45.06 sq mi (116.70 km^{2})
  - Land: 45.06 sq mi (116.70 km^{2})
  - Water: 0 sq mi (0.00 km^{2})
- Elevation: 814 ft (248 m)

Population (2020)
  - Total: 904
  - Density: 20.1/sq mi (7.75/km^{2})
- Time zone: UTC-6 (Central (CST))
  - Summer (DST): UTC-5 (CDT)
- ZIP Codes: 74365 (Salina); 74364 (Rose); 74342 (Eucha); 74366 (Spavinaw)
- Area codes: 539/918
- GNIS feature ID: 2584383
- FIPS code: 40-39450

Kenwood is an unincorporated community and census-designated place (CDP) in Delaware and Mayes counties, Oklahoma, United States. As of the 2020 census, it had a population of 904, down from 1,224 in 2010.

== History ==
Kenwood once had a post office, which opened on May 25, 1922. The community's name came from a combination of William Kennedy and the National Hardwood Company.

== Geography ==
The eastern half of Kenwood is in Delaware County, while the western half is in Mayes County. Kenwood is 20 miles (32 km) by road southwest of Jay, the Delaware County seat. It is 11 miles (18 km) east of Salina. According to the U.S. Census Bureau, the Kenwood CDP has an area of 45.1 square miles (116.8 km^{2}), all of it recorded as land. The community is drained by Saline Creek, which flows west through the center of the CDP and joins the Neosho River in Lake Hudson 3 miles (5 km) to the west of the CDP's border.

== Demographics ==
Historical population
Census	Pop.	Note	%±
2010	1,224		—
2020	904		−26.1%
U.S. Decennial Census

=== 2020 census ===
As of the 2020 census, Kenwood had a population of 904. The median age was 40.6 years. 23.5% of residents were under the age of 18 and 17.8% of residents were 65 years of age or older. For every 100 females there were 95.7 males, and for every 100 females age 18 and over there were 98.3 males age 18 and over.

0.0% of residents lived in urban areas, while 100.0% lived in rural areas.

There were 318 households in Kenwood, of which 35.5% had children under the age of 18 living in them. Of all households, 59.4% were married-couple households, 13.8% were households with a male householder and no spouse or partner present, and 19.8% were households with a female householder and no spouse or partner present. About 17.6% of all households were made up of individuals and 7.9% had someone living alone who was 65 years of age or older.

There were 411 housing units, of which 22.6% were vacant. The homeowner vacancy rate was 1.5% and the rental vacancy rate was 0.0%.

Racial composition as of the 2020 census
Race	Number	Percent
White	306	33.8%
Black or African American	1	0.1%
American Indian and Alaska Native	508	56.2%
Asian	11	1.2%
Native Hawaiian and Other Pacific Islander	0	0.0%
Some other race	5	0.6%
Two or more races	73	8.1%
Hispanic or Latino (of any race)	19	2.1%

=== 2010 census ===
As of the 2010 United States census, Kenwood had a population of 1,224.

== Education ==
It is divided between the Wickliffe Public School elementary school district and the Salina Public Schools school district.
