= Oklahoma State Highway 82 =

Highway in Oklahoma

State Highway 82
- SH 82 highlighted in red

Route information
- Maintained by ODOT

Section 1
- Length: 43.2 mi (69.5 km)
- South end: SH-1 / SH-63 west of Talihina
- Major intersections: US 270 in Red Oak
- North end: SH-9 in Stigler

Section 2
- Length: 99.2 mi (159.6 km)
- South end: I-40 in Vian
- Major intersections: US 64 in Vian; US 62 / SH-10 / SH-51 in Tahlequah; US 412 / Cherokee Turnpike in Locust Grove
- North end: US 60 / US 69 east of Vinita

Location
- Country: United States
- State: Oklahoma

Highway system
- Oklahoma State Highway System; Interstate; US; State; Turnpikes
| ← US 81 | → US 83 |

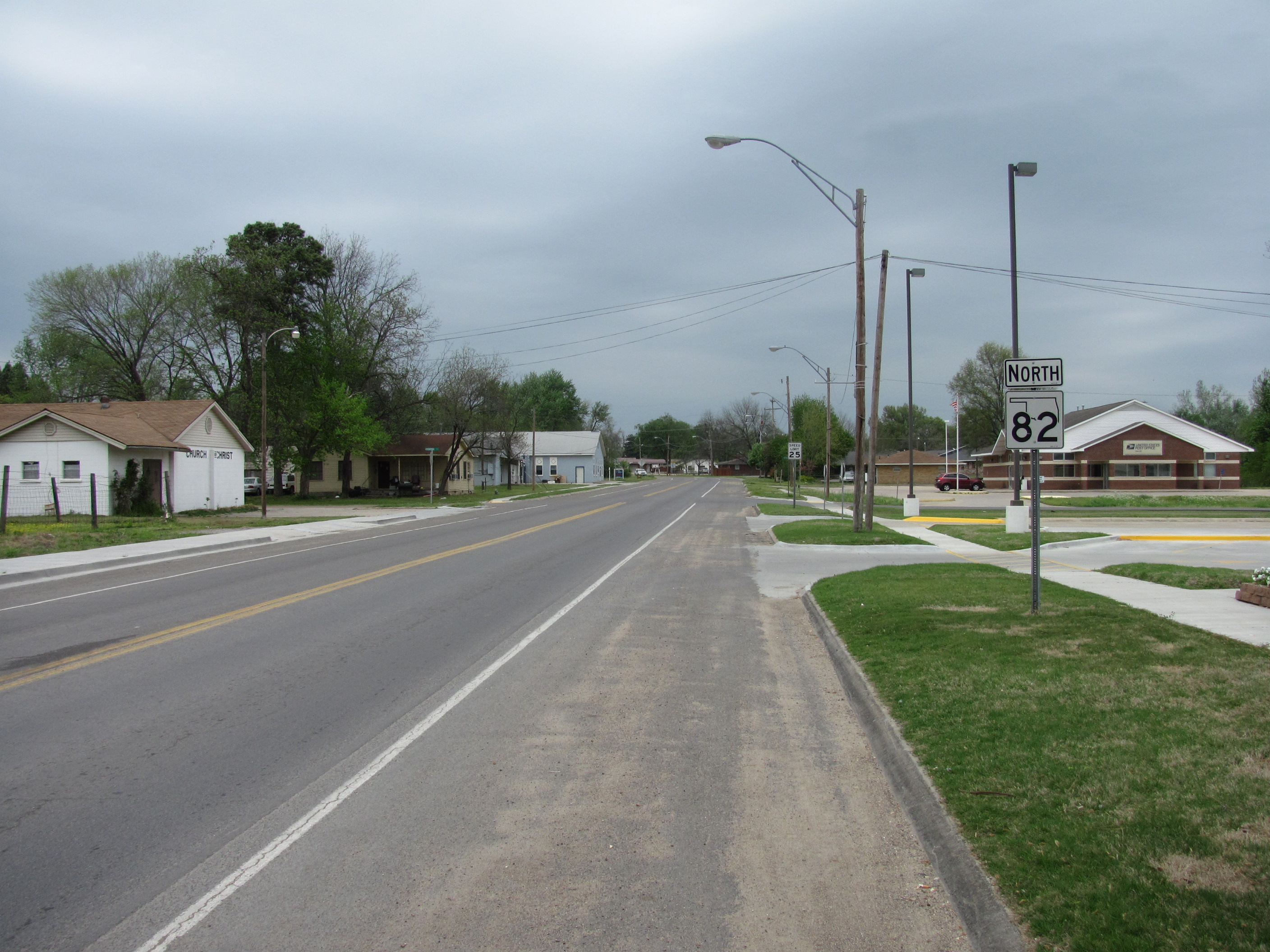
Northbound in Vian, Oklahoma

State Highway 82, abbreviated to SH-82 or OK-82, is a state highway in Oklahoma. It runs for 43.2 miles (69.5 km) north–south during its southern segment; and 99.2 miles (159.6 km) north–south during its northern segment.

== Route description ==
=== Southern section ===
The southern SH-82 begins at SH-1 and SH-63 in Le Flore County west of Talihina. It then heads north from there, entering Latimer County and running along the west side of Bengal. Near Red Oak, it shares a brief concurrency US-270. North of there, it runs east of the Sansbois Mountains, meeting SH-31 at Lequire. From there, SH-82 continues north until the southern section ends at a junction with SH-9 in Stigler.

=== Northern section ===
The northern SH-82 begins at Interstate 40 exit 297 just south of Vian. In Vian, SH-82 meets US-64. Six miles north of Vian, SH-82 runs through Box before meeting SH-100 and forming a concurrency with it on the east shore of Lake Tenkiller. After splitting from SH-100, SH-82 heads through Keys before forming another concurrency, this time with US-62 and SH-10. The highways then enter Tahlequah, where SH-82 splits off from the other two routes.

SH-82 runs through downtown Tahlequah before meeting SH-51 SPUR in the northwestern part of the city. SH-82 turns northwest, running through Gideon and Peggs. It has an interchange with the Cherokee Turnpike south of Locust Grove. In Locust Grove, it meets Alternate U.S. Highway 412. It then heads towards Salina, where it begins a concurrency with SH-20. The two routes split up after running through Spavinaw. SH-82 then has a brief concurrency with SH-28 west of Langley. It serves as the western terminus of SH-85 west of Ketchum. SH-82 itself ends seven miles (11 km) north of there at a junction with US-60/69 east of Vinita.

== SH-82A ==
State Highway 82A
- Location: Langley
- Length: 0.36 mi (580 m)
- Existed: ?–March 5, 2018

State Highway 82A was the sole suffixed highway spur branching from SH-82. It began at SH-82 (3rd Street) in Langley, following Cherokee Street to the east. It then angled northeastward to end at SH-28 near Pensacola Dam. It was 0.36 miles (0.58 km) long.

SH-82A was removed from the state highway system on March 5, 2018.

== Junction list ==
=== Southern section ===
| County | Location | mi | km | Destinations | Notes |
|---|---|---|---|---|---|
| Le Flore | | 0.0 | 0.0 | SH-1 / SH-63 | South section's southern terminus |
| Latimer | No major junctions | | | | |
| Le Flore | No major junctions | | | | |
| Latimer | Red Oak | 17.6 | 28.3 | US 270 | Western end of US-270 concurrency |
| Latimer | Red Oak | 18.3 | 29.5 | US 270 | Eastern end of US-270 concurrency |
| Haskell | Lequire | 31.3 | 50.4 | SH-31 | Western end of SH-31 concurrency |
| Haskell | Lequire | 32.3 | 52.0 | SH-31 | Eastern end of SH-31 concurrency |
| Haskell | Stigler | 43.2 | 69.5 | SH-9 | South section's northern terminus |
1.000 mi = 1.609 km; 1.000 km = 0.621 mi: Concurrency terminus

=== Northern section ===
| County | Location | mi | km | Destinations | Notes |
|---|---|---|---|---|---|
| Sequoyah | Vian | 0.0 | 0.0 | I-40 | North section's southern terminus |
| Sequoyah | Vian | 0.7 | 1.1 | US 64 | |
| Sequoyah | | 9.1 | 14.6 | SH-100 | Southern end of SH-100 concurrency |
| Cherokee | | 22.7 | 36.5 | SH-100 | Northern end of SH-100 concurrency |
| Cherokee | | 32.3 | 52.0 | US 62 / SH-10 | Southern end of US-62/SH-10 concurrency |
| Cherokee | Tahlequah | 34.5 | 55.5 | SH-51 west / US 62 Bus. north | Southern end of SH-51 concurrency; southern terminus of US Bus 62 |
| Cherokee | Tahlequah | 36.8 | 59.2 | US 62 / SH-10 / SH-51 / US 62 Bus. west | Northern end of US-62/SH-10/SH-51 concurrency; northern terminus of US Bus 62 |
| Cherokee | Tahlequah | 39.6 | 63.7 | SH-51 Spur | Eastern terminus of SH-51 Spur |
| Mayes | | 61.3 | 98.7 | US 412 / Cherokee Turnpike | Exit 6 on Cherokee Turnpike |
| Mayes | Locust Grove | 62.1 | 99.9 | US 412 Alt. | |
| Mayes | Salina | 69.0 | 111.0 | SH-20 | Southern end of SH-20 concurrency |
| Mayes | | 83.5 | 134.4 | SH-20 | Northern end of SH-20 concurrency |
| Mayes | Langley | 87.9 | 141.5 | SH-82A | Western terminus of SH-82A |
| Mayes | Langley | 88.3 | 142.1 | SH-28 | Southern end of SH-28 concurrency |
| Mayes | Langley | 89.1 | 143.4 | SH-28 | Northern end of SH-28 concurrency |
| Craig | | 92.1 | 148.2 | SH-85 | Western terminus of SH-85 |
| Craig | | 99.2 | 159.6 | US 60 / US 69 | Northern terminus |
1.000 mi = 1.609 km; 1.000 km = 0.621 mi: Concurrency terminus; Electronic toll collection
