= Box, Oklahoma =

- Unincorporated community
- Location within Oklahoma Location within the United States
- Coordinates: 35°34′42″N 94°58′19″W
- Country: United States
- State: Oklahoma
- County: Sequoyah

Area
  - Total: 3.31 sq mi (8.56 km^{2})
  - Land: 3.29 sq mi (8.52 km^{2})
  - Water: 0.015 sq mi (0.04 km^{2})
- Elevation: 935 ft (285 m)

Population (2020)
  - Total: 153
  - Density: 46.5/sq mi (17.96/km^{2})
- Time zone: UTC-6 (Central (CST))
  - Summer (DST): UTC-5 (CDT)
- Area codes: 918 & 539
- GNIS feature ID: 2584375

Box is an unincorporated community and census-designated place in Sequoyah County, Oklahoma, United States. As of the 2020 census, Box had a population of 153. Oklahoma State Highway 82 passes through the community.

Box was previously known as Roy; its post office changed its name to Box on July 7, 1911, after resident Henry Box. The post office closed on February 29, 1928.

== Geography ==
According to the U.S. Census Bureau, the community has an area of 3.304 square miles (8.56 km^{2}); 3.290 square miles (8.52 km^{2}) of its area is land, and 0.014 square miles (0.036 km^{2}) is water.

== Demographics ==
Historical population
Census	Pop.	Note	%±
2010	224		—
2020	153		−31.7%
U.S. Decennial Census

=== 2020 census ===
As of the 2020 census, Box had a population of 153. The median age was 55.8 years. 19.0% of residents were under the age of 18 and 35.9% of residents were 65 years of age or older. For every 100 females there were 93.7 males, and for every 100 females age 18 and over there were 100.0 males age 18 and over.

0.0% of residents lived in urban areas, while 100.0% lived in rural areas.

There were 76 households in Box, of which 40.8% had children under the age of 18 living in them. Of all households, 59.2% were married-couple households, 9.2% were households with a male householder and no spouse or partner present, and 19.7% were households with a female householder and no spouse or partner present. About 11.8% of all households were made up of individuals and 6.6% had someone living alone who was 65 years of age or older.

There were 78 housing units, of which 2.6% were vacant. The homeowner vacancy rate was 0.0% and the rental vacancy rate was 0.0%.

Racial composition as of the 2020 census
Race	Number	Percent
White	88	57.5%
Black or African American	1	0.7%
American Indian and Alaska Native	38	24.8%
Asian	0	0.0%
Native Hawaiian and Other Pacific Islander	0	0.0%
Some other race	0	0.0%
Two or more races	26	17.0%
Hispanic or Latino (of any race)	5	3.3%

=== 2010 census ===
As of the 2010 United States census, Box had a population of 224.
