= Grand River Dam Authority =

Agency of the state of Oklahoma

- Industry: Utility
- Founded: 1935
- Headquarters: Tulsa, Oklahoma, USA
- Area served: Oklahoma and 3 other states
- Key people: Dan Sullivan, President/CEO
- Products: Electric power and water
- Revenue: US$412 million (2012)
- Number of employees: 500 (approx.)
- Website: https://www.grda.com

The Grand River Dam Authority (GRDA) is an agency of the state of Oklahoma created to control, develop, and maintain the Grand River waterway. It was created by the Oklahoma state legislature in 1935, and is headquartered in Tulsa, Oklahoma. GRDA was designed to be self-funding from the sales of electricity and water. The state of Oklahoma was to provide no funding from taxes. The Authority was authorized to issue revenue bonds to fund large-scale capital investments.

According to GRDA's 2012 Annual Report, the agency had nearly US $412 million in operating revenue for 2012, compared to nearly US $395.5 million in 2011.

It operates three hydroelectric facilities and two reservoirs, Grand Lake, Lake Hudson, and the Salina Pumped Storage Project, which includes W. R. Holway Reservoir, It also owns and operates the GRDA Energy Center (formerly named the GRDA Coal-Fired Complex). The Energy Control Center, home of the GRDA's System Operations Center, is at the Robert S. Kerr Dam, just north of Locust Grove, Oklahoma. In July 2016, it absorbed the mission of the Oklahoma Scenic Rivers Commission to manage, preserve and protect the waters of the scenic Illinois River. Its joint ventures include the Canadian Hills wind farm. GRDA's jurisdiction covers 24 counties in northeastern Oklahoma.

== History ==
The Encyclopedia of Oklahoma History and Culture credits Henry Holderman, a member of the Cherokee tribe, as first envisioning Grand River as a source for hydroelectric power for the Cherokee Nation. Even prior to Oklahoma statehood in 1907, Holderman began building political support for such a project. A feasibility study by the Army Corps of Engineers attracted favorable attention in the Oklahoma legislature, leading to creation of the Grand River Dam Authority (GRDA), a state agency, in 1935. Construction began in 1938 on the Pensacola Dam on the Grand River (lower Neosho River) as a Works Progress Administration project. The dam was completed in March 1940, creating the lake behind it. Between 1941 and 1946, the U.S. government took control of Pensacola Dam to divert power to the war effort. Control was returned to the GRDA by the Congress and President Truman amid local celebration in August 1946.

The second hydroelectric facility built by GRDA was the Markham Ferry project. In 1961, the Markham Ferry dam (since renamed as the Robert S. Kerr Dam) was begun downstream of Pensacola Dam on the Grand River. The lake it impounded was named Lake Hudson. The project was completed in 1964. The powerhouse has four hydroelectric turbines, providing a total capacity of 114,000 kW. GRDA states that an average year can provide 211 million kWh.

The Salina Pumped Storage Project constructed for GRDA during 1968 - 1971, created Lake W. R. Holway. It was designed to produce 260 MW of power during peak consumption periods. During periods of lower power demand, water is pumped from Lake Hudson to Lake Holway and released back down through the pump-generators during periods of high energy demand.

In the late 1970s, the Authority decided to build the GRDA Coal-fired Power Generation Complex, located near Chouteau, Oklahoma. Now more than four decades old, the two units need extensive retrofits to meet new emission regulations and to improve energy efficiency with more modern technologies.

In 2008, GRDA, Oklahoma Gas & Electric (OG&E) and Oklahoma Municipal Power Authority (OMPA) jointly purchased the Redbud Generation facility near Luther, Oklahoma for 434.5 million. The facility uses natural-gas fueled turbines to generate electricity. Rated capacity was 1230 MW. GRDA owns 36 percent of the venture, while OG&E owns 51 percent and is designated as the operator. OMPA owns the balance.

In 2010, GRDA completed a new visitors' center adjacent to Pensacola Dam. The building was designed to be the home of GRDA Ecosystems Management offices, a state-of-the-art water research lab, offices for the Grand Lake Area Chamber of Commerce, a community auditorium and historical exhibits.

On June 13, 2012, GRDA approved becoming a member of the Large Public Power Council (LPPC). The LPPC consists of the largest publicly owned not-for-profit, electric utilities in the U.S. LPPC’s priorities include tax and finance issues, interaction with the Federal Energy Regulatory Commission, energy and environmental policies.

=== Proposed privatization ===
Governor Mary Fallin (R) issued an executive order in July 2013 to establish a 15-member task force that would research the possibility of dismantling GRDA and selling its assets. The members chosen by the governor have “experience or interest in energy issues.” It would include two members of her “Bold Ideas” task force.

Governor Fallin announced on August 13, 2013, that she was suspending the task force and its work indefinitely. She said that she still supported the mission of the task force, she realized that the timing was bad and that the review could undermine GRDA's efforts to sell revenue bonds.

=== Canadian Hills wind farm ===
GRDA has a financial interest in a wind turbine "farm" near El Reno, Oklahoma developed by Apex Wind Energy Holdings LLC and Atlantic Power Corp. Known as the Canadian Hills wind farm, it will sell power to GRDA, the Oklahoma Municipal Power Authority and Southwestern Electric Power Co., a Louisiana-based unit of American Electric Power. The facility initially had 135 turbines and a design output of 300 megawatts of electric power. Google, Inc. contracted with GRDA to buy up to 48 megawatts of this power for its data center in Pryor, Oklahoma.

=== Natural gas fired generation facility ===
On January 14, 2014, the GRDA Board of Directors approved purchase and installation of gas turbine generators to be installed at the GRDA Coal-Fired Complex in Chouteau. The new unit, which is known as Unit 3, is estimated to cost US$372 million, is designed to produce 495 megawatts (MW) of electric power. The turbine-generators alone will cost US$77.84 million. Mitsubishi Power Systems is supplying M501J gas turbines and SRT-50 steam turbines for the new unit.

Concurrently, the Authority renamed the Chouteau complex as the Grand River Energy Center.

The new combined cycle generation process is energy-efficient because natural gas fuels a gas turbine that directly generates power. Then the hot turbine exhaust gas is cooled by boiling water to generate more steam, which drives a steam-powered generator and generates more electric power. The new generation unit was expected to be put in service in 2017, and has since been brought on-line.

== Organization ==
=== Officers ===
As of January 2024

  - Executive Management
  - President/Chief Executive Officer - Dan Sullivan
    - Chief Operating Officer - Tim Brown
    - Chief Financial Officer - Erik Feighner
    - Executive Vice President/Chief of Law Enforcement - Brian Edwards
    - Executive Vice President of Corporate & Strategic Communications - John Wiscaver
    - Executive Vice President for External Relations - Nathan Reese
    - Executive Vice President of Human Resources - Laura Hunter
    - Executive Assistant to CEO / Corporate Secretary - Shelia Allen
    - Vice President of Grand River Energy Center Operations - Robert Ladd
    - General Counsel - Heath Lofton

== Budget and Personnel ==
Standard & Poor's (S&P) Rating Services upgraded GRDA's credit rating in 2007 from "BBB+" to "A−", and improved the outlook from "stable" to "positive". While GRDA has received three rating outlook improvement from rating agencies in recent years, S&P's announcement was historic, marking the first rating upgrade in GRDA's history. The Fitch Rating Service followed suit in 2008. The A− rating was still in effect at the end of 2012, meaning that GRDA has very favorable terms for borrowing money.

According to GRDA's 2012 Annual Report, the agency had nearly US $412 million in operating revenue for 2012, compared to nearly US $395.5 million in 2011.

GRDA, as of Fiscal Year 2009, had an annual operating budget of $314 million and employed 450 employees (390 classified and 60 unclassified).

== See also ==
- Grand Lake o' the Cherokees
- Lake Hudson
- Salina Pumped Storage Project
