= Salina, Oklahoma =

Salina, Oklahoma Cherokee: ᎠᎼᎯ
- Town
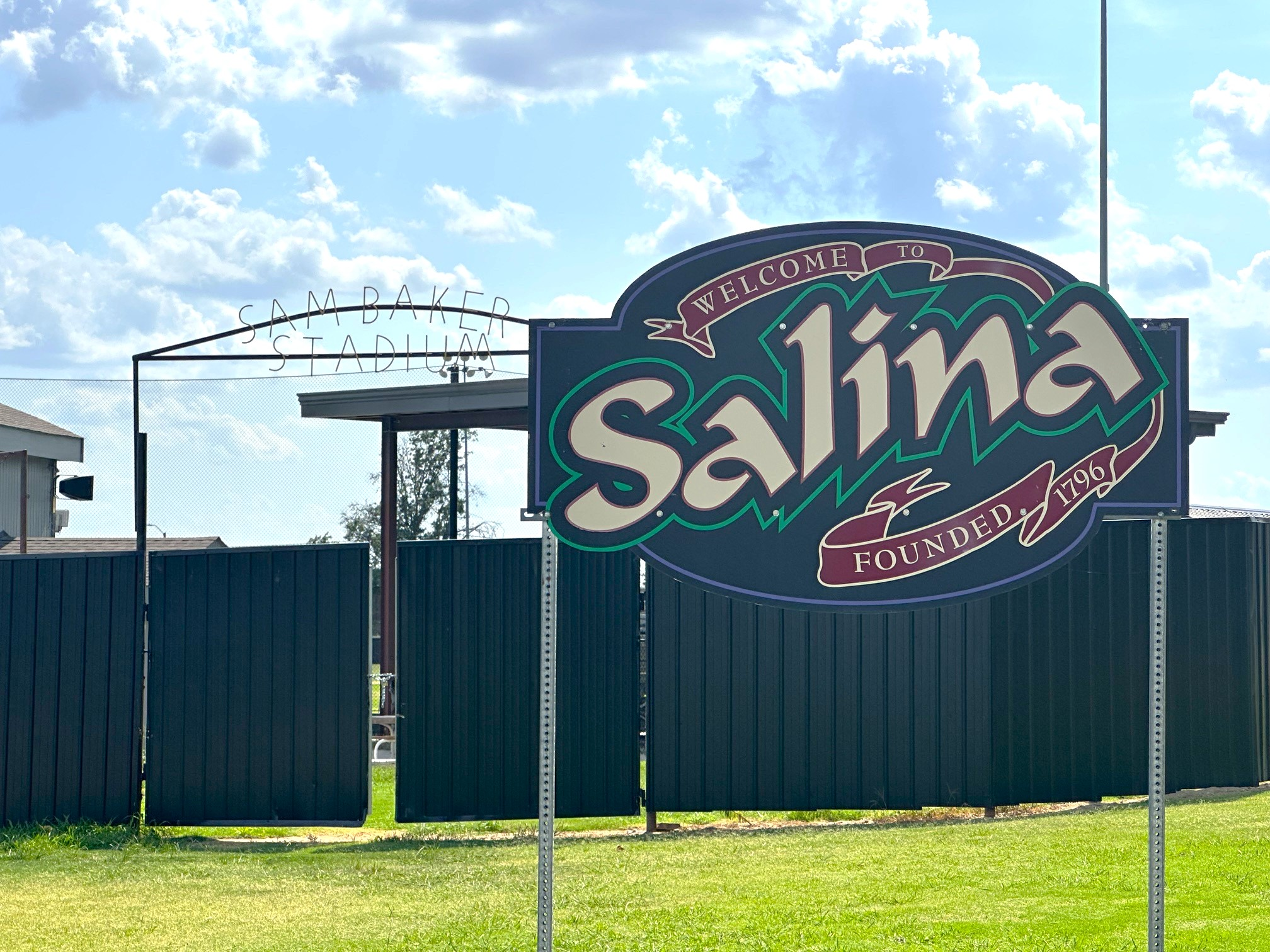
- Salina Welcome Sign in front of Sam Baker Stadium, August of 2026
- Motto: The Little Town Behind the Dikes
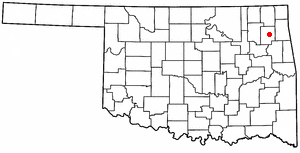
- Location in Oklahoma
- Coordinates: 36°17′27″N 95°09′10″W
- Country: United States
- State: Oklahoma
- County: Mayes

Government
  - Mayor: Randall Plumlee

Area
  - Total: 1.18 sq mi (3.06 km^{2})
  - Land: 1.07 sq mi (2.78 km^{2})
  - Water: 0.11 sq mi (0.28 km^{2})
- Elevation: 640 ft (200 m)

Population (2020)
  - Total: 1,085
  - Density: 1,011.1/sq mi (390.39/km^{2})
- Time zone: UTC-6 (Central (CST))
  - Summer (DST): UTC-5 (CDT)
- ZIP Code: 74365
- Area codes: 539/918
- FIPS code: 40-64950
- GNIS feature ID: 2413250
- Website: salina.municipalimpact.com

Salina (/səˈlaɪnə/ sə-LY-nə) is a town in Mayes County, Oklahoma, United States. The population was 1,085 at the 2020 census, down from 1,396 in 2010.

== History ==
For thousands of years indigenous peoples had lived along the rivers in this area, with varying cultures. By the time of European encounter, the Osage was a major tribe in the area. Their territory started at the Missouri River and extended west, including to parts of present-day Arkansas.

In 1541 the Spanish explorer Hernando de Soto and expedition passed through the area, as did the 1721 expedition of Bernard de la Harpe. They gave Spanish names to many of the local streams, which the Osage had already named.

In 1796 Jean-Pierre Chouteau, a French trader from St. Louis, established the first trading post in 1796, at the junction of the Grand/Neosho River and Saline Creek for business with the Osage. Remembered today as one of the first permanent "white" (European-American) settlements in present-day Oklahoma, at that time the area was part of Spanish Louisiana. The United States took possession of the land that included Salina with the Louisiana Purchase in 1803.

By 1817, keelboats were landing goods at Salina from Fort Smith, Arkansas, and the area was considered part of what was known as "Indian Territory" of the United States. That year, Chouteau's son Auguste Pierre and his partner Joseph Revoir received an exclusive license from Spanish authorities to trade with the Osage. In 1820, the Spanish government of the time took the monopoly away. Chouteau convinced the Osage tribe, under the leadership of Cashesgra ("Big Trek"), to migrate into Indian Territory near the trading post, and ensured the survival of the business.

In 1820, the United States Department of War authorized Epaphras Chapman to establish the Union Mission near the mouth of Chouteau Creek to educate and convert the Osage. The mission had the first printing press in present-day Oklahoma. Under its policy of Indian removal, the US government began to remove Native American tribes from the Southeast, giving them land in the Territory in exchange.

The Indians boiled salt from the water rising from limestone rock about a mile south of the trading post. Springs included one hot water geyser that shot boiling water 8 to 10 feet (2.4 to 3.0 m) into the air. Chouteau obtained the springs in a treaty in 1825 and sold them to Sam Houston in 1830. A Cherokee, Captain John Rogers, began making salt from the springs and named them "Grand Saline". He built his home nearby. Washington Irving visited on October 6, 1832, accompanied by Sam Houston. In 1838 the government began moving Cherokee to the area in implementation of the Indian Removal Act.

By 1839, Rogers was operating 115 salt kettles. He lost the salt works in 1844 to the Cherokee Nation under a new law defining their territory. The Cherokee leased the works to Lewis Ross (brother of Chief John Ross). Ross built a house there and operated the salt business using African American slave labor. Drilling for salt water, in 1859 Ross accidentally hit the first vein of oil in Indian Territory (Oklahoma). It flowed at the rate of 10 barrels a day for a year. He operated two stores in Salina.

In 1862 during the American Civil War, Union soldiers came down unopposed on the Grand River to Salina and set all slaves free. The soldiers ransacked the Ross home, had the slaves load everything on wagons, and hauled the goods across the border to the free state of Kansas. In 1872 the Cherokee Nation purchased the Ross home for $26,000 and used it for years as the Cherokee Orphan Asylum. It was destroyed by fire in 1899. Reconstructed, the structure is now used as a gym.

The Cherokee chief Samuel Houston Mayes established a ferry and mercantile business on the Grand River in 1906.

The establishment of the Old Chouteau Trading Post at Salina was commemorated on October 10–11, 1938, and has become an annual celebration. Among those speaking at the inaugural event were Governor-Elect Leon C. Phillips, Dr. M. L. Wardell of the University of Oklahoma, Mr. Thomas J. Harrison of Pryor, and Yvonne Chouteau, a descendant of Jean Pierre Chouteau.

== Geography ==
The town is in east-central Mayes County, situated on the eastern shore of Lake Hudson, formed by the impoundment of the Grand River (Neosho River). Oklahoma State Highway 20 passes through the town, crossing Lake Hudson to the west and leading 9 miles (14 km) to Pryor Creek, the county seat; and leading northeast 13 miles (21 km) to Spavinaw. State Highway 82 runs with Highway 20 northeast to Spavinaw but leads south 7 miles (11 km) to Locust Grove.

According to the U.S. Census Bureau, the town of Salina has a total area of 1.27 square miles (3.29 km^{2}), of which 1.16 square miles (3.00 km^{2}) are land and 0.11 square miles (0.28 km^{2}), 8.57%, are water.

== Demographics ==
Historical population
Census	Pop.	Note	%±
1920	411		—
1930	582		41.6%
1940	687		18.0%
1950	905		31.7%
1960	972		7.4%
1970	1,024		5.3%
1980	1,115		8.9%
1990	1,153		3.4%
2000	1,422		23.3%
2010	1,396		−1.8%
2020	1,085		−22.3%
U.S. Decennial Census

=== 2020 census ===
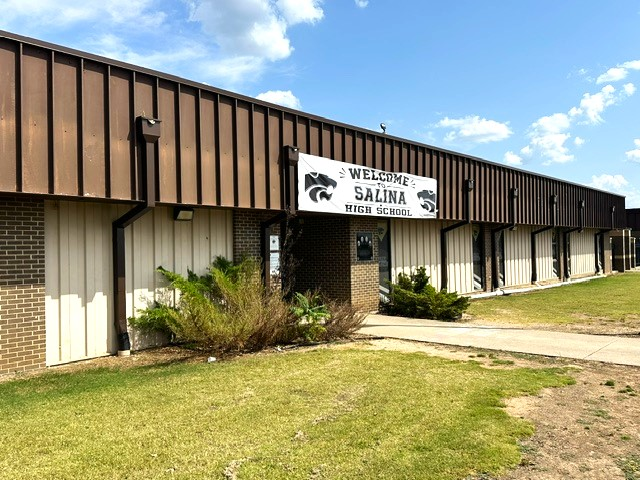
Salina High School in August of 2026

As of the 2020 census, Salina had a population of 1,085. The median age was 39.0 years. 23.9% of residents were under the age of 18 and 19.5% of residents were 65 years of age or older. For every 100 females there were 87.4 males, and for every 100 females age 18 and over there were 83.6 males age 18 and over.

0.0% of residents lived in urban areas, while 100.0% lived in rural areas.

There were 441 households in Salina, of which 30.4% had children under the age of 18 living in them. Of all households, 35.6% were married-couple households, 20.6% were households with a male householder and no spouse or partner present, and 34.7% were households with a female householder and no spouse or partner present. About 33.4% of all households were made up of individuals and 14.3% had someone living alone who was 65 years of age or older.

There were 557 housing units, of which 20.8% were vacant. The homeowner vacancy rate was 1.6% and the rental vacancy rate was 6.8%.

Racial composition as of the 2020 census
Race	Number	Percent
White	559	51.5%
Black or African American	2	0.2%
American Indian and Alaska Native	321	29.6%
Asian	8	0.7%
Native Hawaiian and Other Pacific Islander	0	0.0%
Some other race	8	0.7%
Two or more races	187	17.2%
Hispanic or Latino (of any race)	23	2.1%

=== 2010 census ===
As of 2010 Salina had a population of 1,396. The racial and ethnic composition of the population was 52.0% white, 0.1% African American, 37.5% Native American, 0.1% Asian, 0.1% from some other race and 10.2% reporting two or more races. 1.0% of the population was Hispanic or Latino.

=== 2000 census ===
As of the census of 2000, there were 1,422 people, 562 households, and 351 families residing in the town. The population density was 1,375.2 inhabitants per square mile (531.0/km^{2}). There were 668 housing units at an average density of 646.0 per square mile (249.4/km^{2}). The racial makeup of the town was 59.56% White, 0.14% African American, 34.74% Native American, 0.07% Asian, 0.28% from other races, and 5.20% from two or more races. Hispanic or Latino of any race were 2.04% of the population.

There were 562 households, out of which 29.4% had children under the age of 18 living with them, 45.2% were married couples living together, 12.6% had a female householder with no husband present, and 37.4% were non-families. 33.5% of all households were made up of individuals, and 15.7% had someone living alone who was 65 years of age or older. The average household size was 2.40 and the average family size was 3.10.

In the town, the population was spread out, with 25.6% under the age of 18, 9.4% from 18 to 24, 24.9% from 25 to 44, 23.1% from 45 to 64, and 16.9% who were 65 years of age or older. The median age was 36 years. For every 100 females, there were 93.2 males. For every 100 females age 18 and over, there were 87.6 males.

The median income for a household in the town was $23,519, and the median income for a family was $31,000. Males had a median income of $26,552 versus $17,292 for females. The per capita income for the town was $11,928. About 16.2% of families and 20.4% of the population were below the poverty line, including 24.7% of those under age 18 and 27.5% of those age 65 or over.

== Historic site ==
The Spring House, off State Highway 20, is listed on the National Register of Historic Places. It is one of the oldest existing properties in the state, important for its association with Lewis Ross, brother of Cherokee chief John Ross. Lewis Ross settled in the area around 1838, building both a home and, in 1844, an octagonally-shaped spring house. The home later became an orphanage and was destroyed by fire in 1903, but the spring house survived.

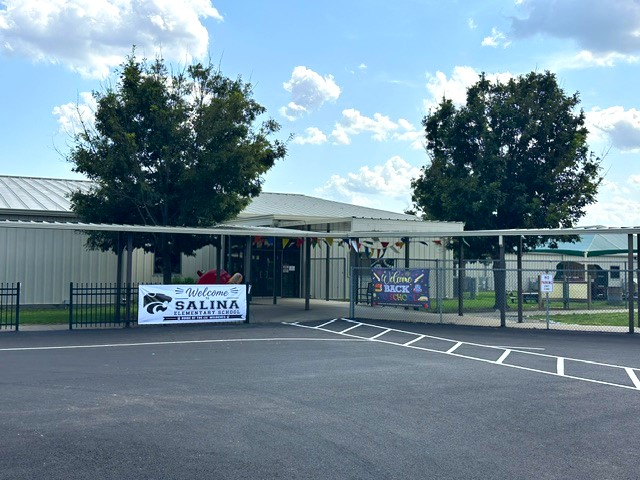
Salina Elementary School, August 2026

== Education ==
The majority of Salina is in the Salina Public Schools school district, while the piece on the other side of Lake Hudson is in the Pryor Public Schools school district.

== Notable people ==
- Carl Belew, country music singer-songwriter
- Gary Condit, former congressman
