= Grand Lake o' the Cherokees =

Lake in Oklahoma, United States

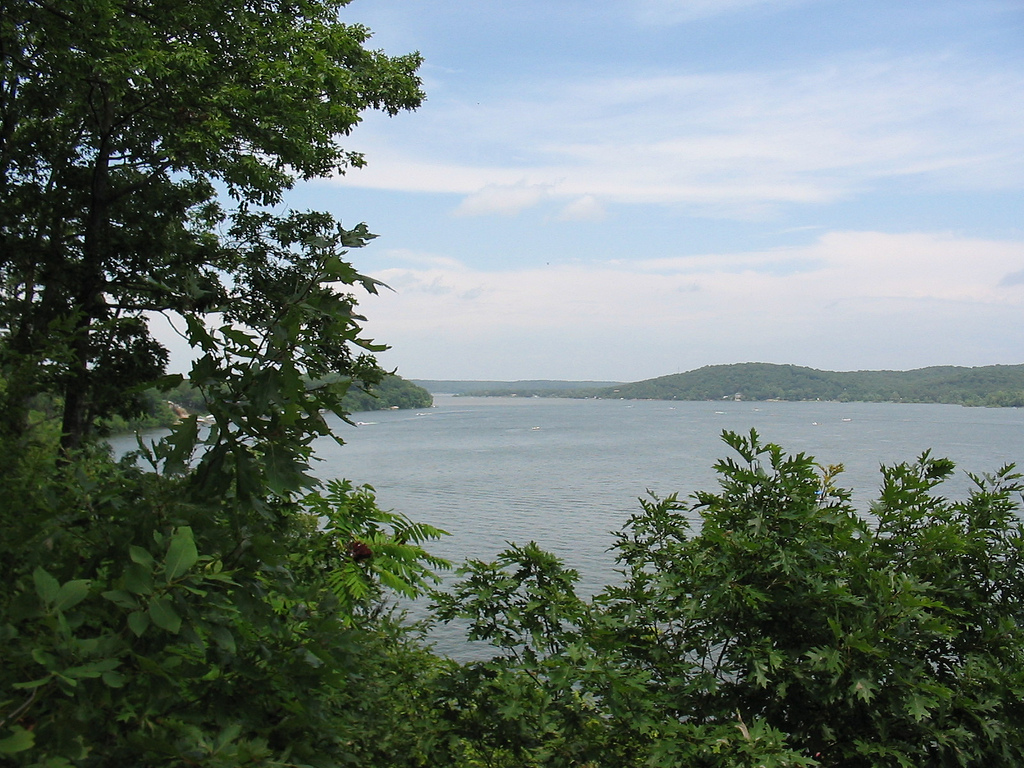
- View of a portion of Grand Lake near Grove, Oklahoma

- Location within Oklahoma Location within the United States
- Location: Delaware / Ottawa / Mayes / Craig counties, Oklahoma, US
- Coordinates: 36°36′43″N 94°50′29″W
- Basin countries: United States
- Surface area: 46,500 acres (18,800 ha)
- Surface elevation: 745 ft (227 m)
- Settlements: Grove, Oklahoma, Disney, Oklahoma, Langley, Oklahoma

Grand Lake o' the Cherokees, often simply called Grand Lake, is a lake situated in Northeast Oklahoma in the foothills of the Ozark Mountain Range. It is administered by the Grand River Dam Authority. It is one of Oklahoma's 'Big Three' lakes, along with Lake Eufaula and Lake Tenkiller.

The lake is surrounded by the towns of Grove to the northeast, Bernice to the north, Langley and Disney to the southeast, and Jay to the south. The center peninsula of the lake is referred to as Monkey Island.

== History ==
Henry Holderman, a Cherokee Nation member, was the first to envision Grand River as a source for hydroelectric power for the Cherokee Nation. Even prior to Oklahoma statehood in 1907, Holderman began building political support for such a project. A feasibility study by the Army Corps of Engineers attracted favorable attention in the Oklahoma legislature, leading to creation of the Grand River Dam Authority (GRDA), a state agency, in 1935. Construction began in 1938 on the Pensacola Dam on the Grand River (V Neosho River) as a Works Progress Administration project. The dam was completed in March 1940, creating the lake behind it. Between 1941 and 1946, the U.S. government took control of Pensacola Dam to divert power to the war effort. Control was returned to the GRDA by the Congress and President Truman amid local celebration in August 1946.

== Pensacola Dam ==
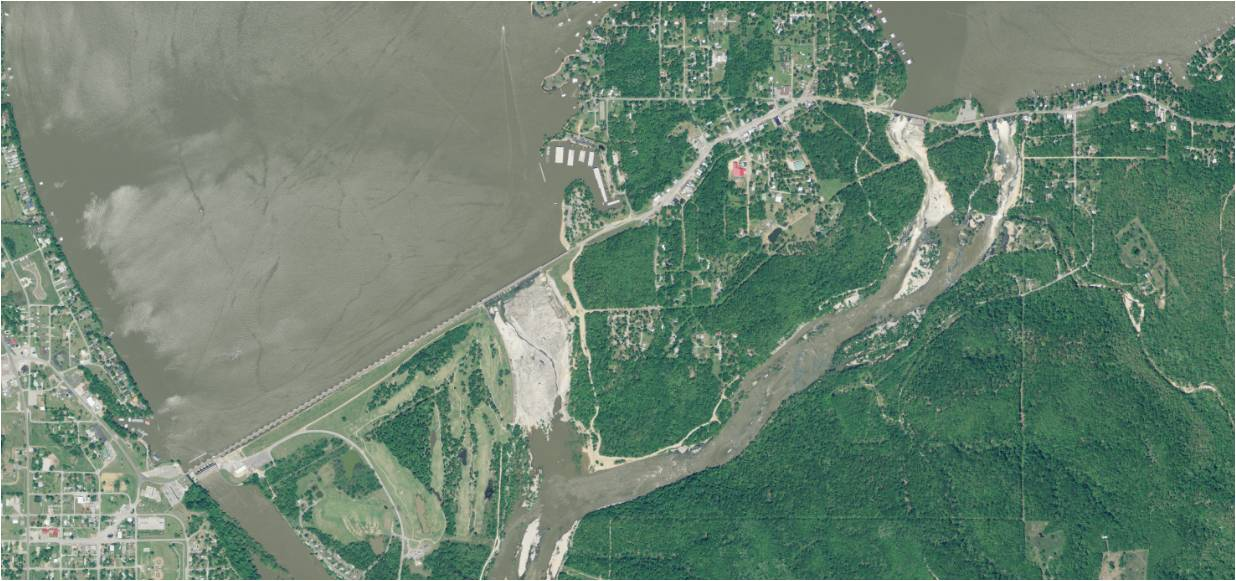
Aerial View of Pensacola Dam and Grand Lake

Pensacola Dam is claimed to be the longest multiple-arch dam in the world, its main span consisting of 51 arches totaling 5,145 feet (1,568 m) in length, and supporting a walkway and State Highway 28, a narrow, two-lane highway. A 120-megawatt, six-unit powerhouse sits at the west end, with 21 spillways on the east end. The project's chief engineer was W. R. Holway (who was also responsible for Tulsa's Spavinaw water project), while the architect of record for the PWA-style Art Deco design of the dam and powerhouse was Tulsan John Duncan Forsyth.

Another mile east, through the town of Disney, lie two small sister dams known as "the spillways" with an additional 21 gates, surrounded by public parks and launching ramp. About 510,000 cubic yards (390,000 m^{3}) of concrete were used in the construction of Pensacola Dam, poured 24 hours a day in just 20 months with Depression-era labor. The lake and the electric utilities, as well as other projects in the region along the Grand River, are administered by the GRDA, an agency created by the Oklahoma Legislature in 1935.

Grand Lake has a surface area of 41,779 acres (169.07 km^{2}) of water, a storage volume of 1,515,416 acre-feet, and 1,366 miles (2,198 km) of shoreline. Unlike other lakes in Oklahoma, Grand Lake is a deep and mostly rocky lake. The average depth for Grand Lake is 36.3 feet. Its mean elevation is 745 ft (227 m) above sea level. In recent years, low fall elevations of 741 were kept by the GRDA to allow millet seeding for migratory waterfowl, resulting in conflict between property owners, environmentalists, and federal agencies. While not expressly built for flood control, Grand Lake contributes to the flood-prone Arkansas River watershed. The Army Corps of Engineers controls releases into the McClellan-Kerr Arkansas River Navigation System when lake levels exceed 745 feet (227 m), although locking into Grand Lake is not possible. Grand Lake and its neighbor, Lake Hudson (also managed by the GRDA), are the only two major lakes in the state where one can build directly on the waterfront.

Residents of the town of Miami and Native American groups have objected to proposals to increase high water levels at Pensacola Dam to maintain the water level at Grand Lake. Miami residents are concerned that water backing up downstream from Miami on the Neosho River can contribute to Miami's flooding problems.

== Recreation ==
The lake is a popular destination for entertainment in the Green Country region. A number of shows are in the area, as well as resorts, and a 67-foot-long, twin-deck, paddle-wheel riverboat called the Cherokee Queen, which has been in operation since the 1940s. Consistently ranked among the top bass fishing lakes in the United States, Grand Lake also houses a wide variety of other sport and nonsport fishing. Due to its predictable winds, it attracts sailboaters from across the country, as well.

== In popular culture ==
- In the book The Bean Trees by Barbara Kingsolver, Taylor, Turtle, Estevan, and Esperanza visit the lake.
- The lake, as well as Leon Russell's Paradise Studios, is featured in the 1974 Les Blank documentary A Poem Is a Naked Person.

== See also ==
- Lakes in Oklahoma
