= Lake Hudson (Oklahoma) =

Lake Hudson Dam
- Location within Oklahoma
- Country: United States
- Location: Mayes County, Oklahoma
- Coordinates: 36.23343°N 95.18191°W
- Construction began: December 1961

Dam and spillways
- Height: 645 ft (197 m)

Reservoir
- Creates: Lake Hudson (Markham Ferry Reservoir)
- Total capacity: nominal: 200,300 acre⋅ft (247,100,000 m^{3}) maximum: 400,000 acre⋅ft (490,000,000 m^{3})
- Surface area: 12,000 acres (49 km^{2})
- Website hudson.uslakes.info/DamInfo.asp?DamID=102046

Lake Hudson, also known as Markham Ferry Reservoir, is a man-made reservoir in Mayes County, Oklahoma, United States, about 2 miles (3.2 km) northwest of Locust Grove, Oklahoma and 8 miles (13 km) southeast of Pryor, Oklahoma. It was created by the completion of the Robert S. Kerr Dam on the Grand River in 1964. It is managed by the Grand River Dam Authority (GRDA).

== History ==
GRDA began construction of the Markham Ferry Dam in December 1961. This was the second of GRDA's hydroelectric projects along the Grand River. The first was Pensacola Dam, which created Grand Lake o' the Cherokees. The Markham Ferry project was completed in April 1964.

=== Namesake Controversy ===
The lake was named for Washington E. Hudson, an early-day Tulsa attorney, Oklahoma state legislator, and member of the board of the GRDA from 1955 until he died in 1964. In 1923, he founded the Tulsa Law School.

Researchers reported in 2018 that Wash Hudson was an incorporator of the Tulsa Benevolent Society in 1922, which established the Ku Klux Klan in Tulsa in the following year.

A GRDA spokesman told the reporter that GRDA would investigate the feasibility of renaming the lake, in view of these reports. He had said that the utility had never before received any complaints about the lake name, nor about Mr. Hudson himself.

GRDA spokesman John Wiscaver says the agency investigated Hudson's background after being approached by the online publication The Frontier, which first reported the proposed name change. Wiscaver said it is "fairly clear" Hudson was involved with the Ku Klux Klan and the GRDA supports the bill.

The lake would become Lake Markham in honor of a Cherokee family that operated a ferry service on a portion of Grand River that is now part of the lake.

In 2019, the State of Oklahoma denied the request to have the name changed from Lake Hudson to Lake Markham.

== Robert S. Kerr Dam structure ==
The Robert S. Kerr Dam structure is a concrete gravity and earth filled embankment with a concrete ogee weir spillway. The length is 4,494 feet (1,370 m), including the powerhouse, and the height is about 90 feet (27 m) above the stream bed. The spillway has seventeen gates, each 40 by 37 feet (12 by 11 m), operated by two traveling gate hoists. Its capacity is 609,000 cubic feet (17,200 m^{3}) per second.

== Lake description ==
The lake has a surface area of 12,000 acres (49 km^{2}), a shoreline of 200 miles (320 km), and a "normal" level (being the top of its conservation pool) of 619 feet (189 m) above sea level. The normal storage capacity is 200,300 acre-feet (247,100,000 m^{3}). The top of the flood control pool is at 636 feet (194 m) above sea level. Kerr dam has a crest elevation of 645 feet (197 m) above sea level.

== Power generation ==
The powerhouse has four hydroelectric turbines, providing a total capacity of 114,000 kW. GRDA states that an average year can provide 211 million kWh.

Lake Hudson also is the water source for the nearby Salina Pumped Storage Project.

== Snowdale State Park ==
Snowdale State Park is located on Lake Hudson in Eastern Oklahoma. A variety of water sports are permitted. Other recreational activities are camping, hiking, swimming and volleyball. It is popular for bass, catfish, perch and crappie fishing. Facilities include a lighted boat ramp, swimming beach, playground, volleyball court, picnic tables, a group picnic shelter and a comfort station with showers. The park offers 17 RV sites with water and electric hookups and 20 tent sites. The campgrounds and restrooms are closed for the winter.

The park is about one mile (1.6 km) west of Salina on SH 20. It is 15 acres (6.1 ha) in area and was built in 1959.

Snowdale became the Snowdale Area at Grand Lake State Park. The Oklahoma Department of Tourism and Recreation chose not to renew its lease on the property from the Grand River Dam Authority in 2019, shutting down the park.
