= Pensacola Dam =

Dam in Mayes County, Oklahoma, U.S.

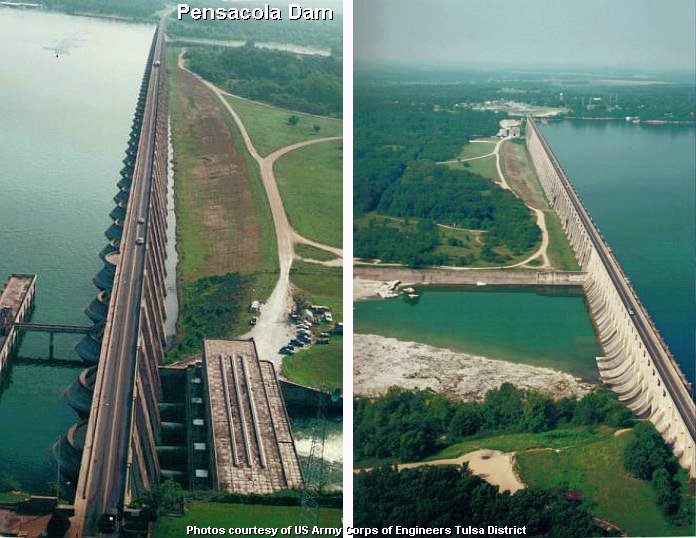
- East and west view of dam, courtesy USACE

- Location in Oklahoma Pensacola Dam (the United States)
- Country: United States
- Location: Mayes County, near Disney and Langley, Oklahoma
- Coordinates: 36°28′19″N 95°01′57″W
- Status: In use
- Construction began: February 1938
- Opening date: March 21, 1940
- Construction cost: $21 million USD

Dam and spillways
- Impounds: Grand River
- Height: 150 ft (46 m)
- Length: Total: 6,565 ft (2,001 m); Multiple-arch section: 4,284 ft (1,306 m); Arches and spillways: 5,145 ft (1,568 m)
- Spillways: 3
- Spillway type: Ogee-type, tainter gate-controlled
- Spillway capacity: 525,000 cu ft/s (14,900 m^{3}/s)

Reservoir
- Creates: Grand Lake o' the Cherokees
- Total capacity: 1,672,000 acre⋅ft (2.062×10^{9} m^{3})
- Surface area: 46,500 acres (18,800 ha)
- Maximum length: 66 mi (106 km)
- Normal elevation: 742 ft (226 m) (normal)

Power Station
- Operator: Grand River Dam Authority
- Commission date: 1941
- Turbines: 6 x 20 MW Francis-type
- Installed capacity: 120 MW
- Pensacola Dam
- U.S. National Register of Historic Places
- U.S. National Historic Landmark
- Architects: John Duncan Forsyth, W. R. Holway
- NRHP reference No.: 03000883
- Added to NRHP: September 9, 2003

The Pensacola Dam, also known as the Grand River Dam, is a multiple-arch buttress dam located between the towns of Disney and Langley on the Grand River in Mayes County, Oklahoma. The dam is operated by the Grand River Dam Authority and creates Grand Lake o' the Cherokees. After decades of vision and planning, it was constructed between 1938 and 1940 for the purposes of hydroelectric power generation, flood control and recreation. It is Oklahoma's first hydroelectric power plant and is referred to as the longest multiple-arch dam in the world.

== Background ==
The idea to construct a dam on the Grand River originated in the late 1800s with Henry C. Holderman, a Cherokee Nation citizen, who wanted to provide electric power to the Cherokee Nation. Holderman and a few colleagues soon conducted the first survey of the river in 1895 on their own handmade houseboat. Holderman later left the United States at the age of 16 and worked on dam projects in India and Africa before returning to Oklahoma. He sold his land holdings and borrowed money from friends in order to purchase rights to the dam sites he had prospected. Over several decades, Holderman and a group known as the "Rainbow Chasers" tried to secure funding to construct the dam; making several trips to Washington DC.

The dam was almost built in 1914 by British capitalists but plans were halted due to World War I. In 1920, Holderman refused an offer given by Chicago businessmen and in 1929, the Wall Street Crash ended the hopes of Canadian engineers and investors building the dam for Holderman. In DC, supporters of the dam, which later included state and federal officials, argued for the dam as a source of hydroelectric power and that it could stimulate the state's economy but local energy providers opposed the possibility of a state-run electric utility. The onset of the Great Depression would revive and accelerate plans to construct the dam. Just prior in 1928, Oklahoma Representative Everette B. Howard secured $5,000 in funding for the U.S. Army Corps of Engineers to survey the Grand River. The results of the study concluded that it would cost over $6.2 million to construct a dam at the "Pensacola site" for flood control. The name "Pensacola" was derived from the only available means of identifying the site at the time: an old store on a Cherokee plantation. Because of limited state funding and a limited water supply on the Grand River, the project was not proposed at first for federal funding under the scope of hydroelectric power but instead for flood control.

Oklahoma established the Grand River Dam Authority (GRDA) on January 10, 1935. Eventually, on September 18, 1937, with the help of Oklahoma Representative Wesley E. Disney, Senator Elmer Thomas and engineer W. R. Holway, President Franklin D. Roosevelt approved $20 million in funding through the New Deal's Public Works Administration for the dam. The higher cost for the dam was attributed to a project that was approved for additional purposes, including hydroelectric power generation and recreation. Additional costs for the dam were covered by the state government and by GRDA municipal bond auctions which appropriated or raised $11 million. Disney had pushed much of the legislation for the dam, comparing the higher electric utility rates in Oklahoma compared to other states. Senator Thomas helped appropriate additional state and public funding for the dam while also being instrumental in its legislation.

Once approved and funded, Holway, the main engineer on the project and previous engineer of the nearby Spavinaw Dam, began survey and engineering work on October 25, 1937. The multiple-arch buttress design was adopted because materials were expensive at the time of the Great Depression and the limestone and chert foundation was considered "ideal" for the design. John Duncan Forsyth served as the architect for the dam and applied an Art Deco-style to it and the power house. Massman Construction Company out of Kansas City, Missouri was selected to construct the major superstructures, including the dam and power plant. Thousands of workers moved to the area to work on the dam before construction began and 3,000 eventually did, earning about $16 a week.

== Construction ==
Initial construction began in February 1938 and included the excavation of over 1,600,000 yd^{3} (1,200,000 m^{3}) of earth and rock. Workers also constructed the first cofferdam on the east side of the river and left it in place until the arches were above the normal water level. Once this was achieved, workers removed the east cofferdam and constructed another on the west side of the river to divert water from the location of the future power plant. On December 30, 1938, Massman began the first concrete pour. Pouring was conducted 24-hours a day for 20 months, totaling 510,000 yd^{3} (390,000 m^{3}). A total of 23.9 million pounds of steel and iron were placed into the dam's structure to reinforce it. Major works on the dam were complete on March 21, 1940 and the lake was filled by the end of that year's summer. The dam's power plant, with four original hydroelectric generators, began commercial operation in 1941. The dam was finished in 26 months, ahead of schedule. Much of this was attributed to eastern Oklahoma having its 18 driest months on record during construction which alleviated obstacles from flooding. The federal government took control of the dam in November 1941 to aid in the World War II effort and returned it to the GRDA in 1946.

=== Effect on Native Americans ===
The construction of the Pensacola Dam resulted in the loss of 1,285 acres (520 ha) of Cherokee land and 802 acres (325 ha) of the Quapaw Indian Agency, most of which belonged to the Seneca-Cayuga Tribe. This land was condemned and later flooded by the reservoir in 1940. Half of the Seneca-Cayuga Elk River ceremonial area was flooded as well. Having lost significant portions of land, some tribe members were forced to find work on the dam project.

=== Power plant upgrades ===
In the 1950s, two additional generators were added to the power station, bringing the total to six. Between 1995 and 2003, the dam's six hydroelectric generators were upgraded, bringing the installed capacity of the power plant from 92 MW to 120 MW and increasing its generation 20%. Each autumn, a generator was taken out of service, upgraded and returned to service by spring of the next year. The sixth and final generator upgrade was completed in May 2003. Among the components principally upgraded were the turbine shafts and runners.

== Design ==
Pensacola Dam is a multiple-arch buttress type consisting of 51 arches, one main spillway, and two auxiliary spillways. It has a maximum height of 150 ft (46 m) above the river bed. The total length of the dam and its sections is 6,565 ft (2,001 m) while the multiple-arch section is 4,284 ft (1,306 m) long and its combination with the spillway sections measure 5,145 ft (1,568 m). Each arch in the dam has a clear span of 60 ft (18 m) and each buttress is 24 ft (7.3 m) wide. The thickness of the buttress sidewalls ranges from 5 ft (1.5 m) at the base to 2.2 ft (0.67 m) at the crest. Inside of each buttress are 18 in (460 mm) thick transverse walls that act as "stiffeners". The buttresses were the widest of their type prior to 1938 and are designed to withstand 500 lbf/in^{2} (3,400 kPa; 35 kgf/cm^{2}).

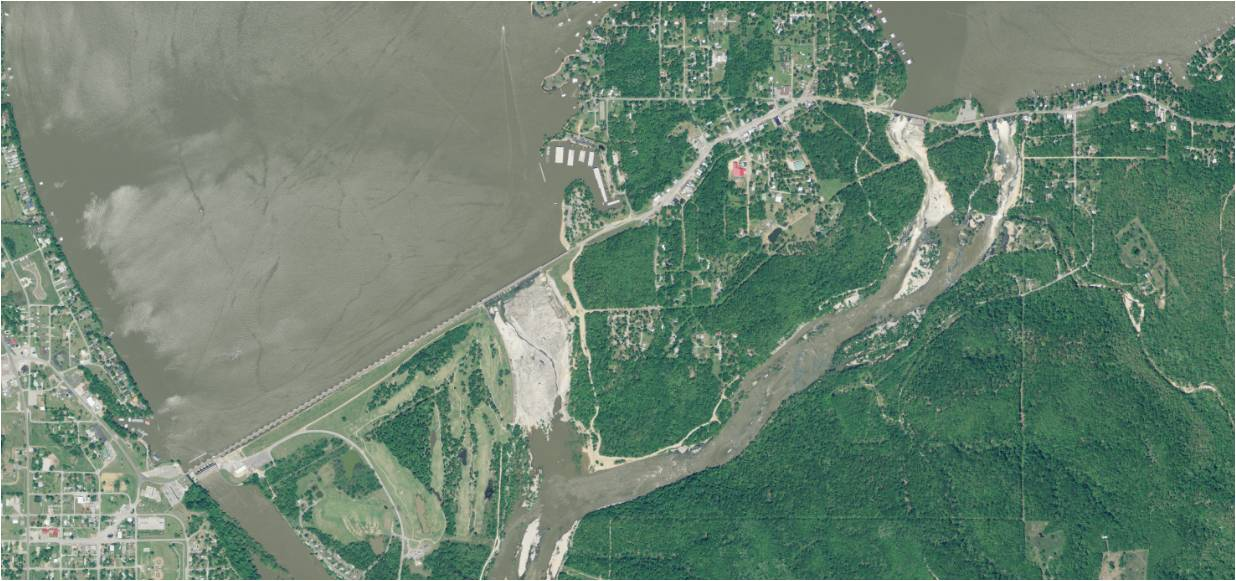
Overhead of dam complex including auxiliary spillways

The main spillway, part of the eastern end of the dam, is a 861 ft (262 m) long Ogee-type and utilizes twenty-one 25 ft (7.6 m) tall and 36 ft (11 m) wide tainter gates that are operated by two 60-ton hoists. The auxiliary spillways are located about 1 mi (1.6 km) northeast of the dam and are controlled by another twenty-one 37 ft (11 m) wide and 15 ft (4.6 m) high tainter gates stretched over their combined 860 ft (260 m) length. The lip of the spillways lie at an elevation of 730 ft (220 m) above sea level while the tops of the gates are 755 ft (230 m). All three spillways have a combined maximum discharge of 525,000 cu ft/s (14,900 m^{3}/s). The two-lane State Highway 28 crosses over the top of the dam and a bridge that stretches over the main spillway. It is accessible by cars and trucks within weight.

The dam's reservoir, Grand Lake o' the Cherokees (Grand Lake over the Cherokees), has a storage capacity of 1,672,000 acre⋅ft (2.062×10^{9} m^{3}) of which 540,000 acre⋅ft (670,000,000 m^{3}) is flood storage. The reservoir's surface area is 46,500 acres (188 km^{2}) and it extends 66 mi (106 km) upstream, creating 1,300 mi (2,100 km) of shoreline. Normal surface elevation is 742 ft (226 m) above sea level.

The dam's power station is located at the base of the dam's western end and its building is 279 ft (85 m) long, 72 ft (22 m) wide and 60 ft (18 m) tall. The building houses six 20 MW Francis turbine generators that generate 335 million kWh annually and are each fed with their own individual penstock. The power plant is designed to accommodate four additional generators. It operates at its highest generation levels during the summer and lowest during the winter. Just west of the power station is its substation and an observation house.

== Regulation ==
The power station is regulated by the Federal Energy Regulatory Commission (FERC), under the Federal Power Act, with the current license issued in 1992 and set to expire in 2025. The first license was granted by the FERC's predecessor, the Federal Power Commission in 1939. When the reservoir's elevation exceeds 745 ft (227 m), control of the dam's discharges are transferred to the U.S. Army Corps of Engineers (USACE) who manage flood control in the larger basin. By federal regulation, the GRDA and the Corps of Engineers often coordinate discharges and reservoir levels.

=== Impact ===
FERC and USACE regulated releases downstream from the dam have been the center of controversy in recent years. Since the dam is a multi-purpose project, there are conflicting interests between flood control, environmental conservation, recreation and hydroelectric power production. The USACE may request minimal releases to prevent flooding in areas downstream and in hot mid-summer periods, releases can be minimal. This reduces dissolved oxygen (DO) levels in the river downstream. Such reductions resulted in the death of at least 5,000 fish downstream in July 2007. Significant releases from the dam have drawn opposition from people such as Oklahoma State Representative Doug Cox. He argues that the large releases effect the state's economy as an off-road recreational rock park is flooded downstream. Inconsistent releases are blamed for the overall problem and a better regulation of releases has been proposed while the GRDA is contemplating the installation of aeration devices and conducting studies along with other measures. The 1992 FERC license had addressed problematic DO levels and required the GRDA to plan methods to monitor and improve DO levels to a consistency with state water quality standards.

In 2019-2020, residents of the town of Miami and neighboring Native American groups have objected to proposals to increase high water levels at Pensacola Dam and Grand Lake, on the grounds that when water backs up downstream, it can increase Miami's flooding problems.

== Tourism ==
Between Memorial Day and Labor Day, the GRDA offers free tours of the dam. In 2010, there were over 9,000 visitors; a number which has been steadily growing in recent years. Additionally in 2010, the Ecosystems and Education Center was completed and has become part of the tour. The center serves as a water and fish monitoring research lab while offering visitors information about hydropower and water/electrical safety.
