= Locust Grove, Oklahoma =

Town in the United States

- Town
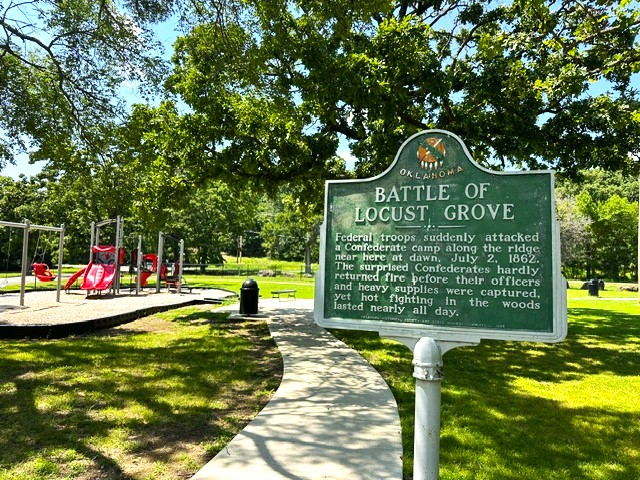
- Sign in local park regarding the Battle of Locust Grove, as seen in July of 2026
- Nickname: The Wonder City
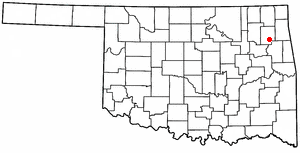
- Location in Oklahoma
- Coordinates: 36°11′53″N 95°10′08″W
- Country: United States
- State: Oklahoma
- County: Mayes

Government
  - Mayor: Jason Williams
  - Vice Mayor: Grant Mennecke
  - Police Chief: Windrunner Eagle

Area
  - Total: 1.82 sq mi (4.72 km^{2})
  - Land: 1.82 sq mi (4.72 km^{2})
  - Water: 0 sq mi (0.00 km^{2})
- Elevation: 669 ft (204 m)

Population (2020)
  - Total: 1,371
  - Density: 752.1/sq mi (290.39/km^{2})
- Time zone: UTC-6 (Central (CST))
  - Summer (DST): UTC-5 (CDT)
- ZIP Code: 74352
- Area codes: 539/918
- FIPS code: 40-43500
- GNIS feature ID: 2412908
- Website: locustgroveok.org

Locust Grove is a town in Mayes County, Oklahoma, United States. The population was 1,371 at the 2020 census, down from 1,423 in 2010.

== History ==
Locust Grove was the site of the Battle of Locust Grove, a small Civil War engagement on July 3, 1862, in which approximately 250 Union troops surprised and destroyed a similar-sized Confederate contingent, killing about 100 and capturing another 100 while sustaining only minimal losses. The escaping Confederates retreated toward Tahlequah, leading to a loss of morale and desertions among the Cherokee Confederate supporters.

A small community, named for the grove of locust trees where this battle took place, formed here, in the Cherokee Nation of Indian Territory. A post office was established here on March 26, 1873. Jim Bryan moved the post office to his store in 1908, after Oklahoma became a state and Mayes County was established. In 1910, Louie Ross bought the Bryan store and moved it to his father's ranch house. The community of Locust Grove soon relocated closer to the store, and soon had a cemetery, a gristmill, two blacksmith shops, and a separate building to house the post office.

The existing townsite was established in 1912 by O.W. Killam, a lawyer, merchant, realtor and promoter who bought the Cherokee allotment that had belonged to Elzina Ross in connection with the construction of the Kansas, Oklahoma and Gulf Railway. Killam platted the townsite and incorporated it on March 4, 1913.

The town has had its share of tragedy. In June 1952, the county attorney Jack Burris was assassinated at his home at Locust Grove in one of the most famous unsolved murders in Oklahoma history. In 1977 it was the location of the Oklahoma Girl Scout murders, in which three young girls were raped and murdered as they were camping at the nearby Camp Scott Girl Scout facility. Gene Leroy Hart was arrested and tried for the crime, but found not guilty in a jury trial. The case remains open. Also, a popular restaurant, "Country Cottage", was linked to a highly publicized August 2008 outbreak of E. coli O111, a rare strain of the bacterium. The outbreak resulted in more than 100 cases of gastrointestinal food poisoning and one death; subsequent studies were unclear about the source of the bacteria, leading Oklahoma Attorney General Drew Edmondson to accuse the state health department of having "botched" the investigation.

Native American Cherokee sculptor Willard Stone lived near Locust Grove; a museum dedicated to his work is now located on the site.

== Geography ==
Locust Grove is in southeastern Mayes County, 7 miles (11 km) south of Salina and 11 miles (18 km) east of Chouteau. U.S. Route 412, a four-lane freeway, passes along the southern border of the town, with access from Exit 6 (State Highway 82). U.S. 412 Alternate follows the former route of the highway through the center of Locust Grove. U.S. 412 leads east 22 miles (35 km) to the town of Kansas and west 47 miles (76 km) to Tulsa. State Highway 82 runs along the eastern border of Locust Grove, leading north to Salina and southeast 26 miles (42 km) to Tahlequah.

According to the U.S. Census Bureau, the town of Locust Grove has a total area of 1.8 square miles (4.7 km^{2}), all land. The town is drained to the west by Crutchfield Branch, a tributary of the Neosho River.

== Demographics ==
Historical population
Census	Pop.	Note	%±
1920	587		—
1930	510		−13.1%
1940	545		6.9%
1950	730		33.9%
1960	828		13.4%
1970	1,090		31.6%
1980	1,179		8.2%
1990	1,326		12.5%
2000	1,366		3.0%
2010	1,423		4.2%
2020	1,371		−3.7%
U.S. Decennial Census

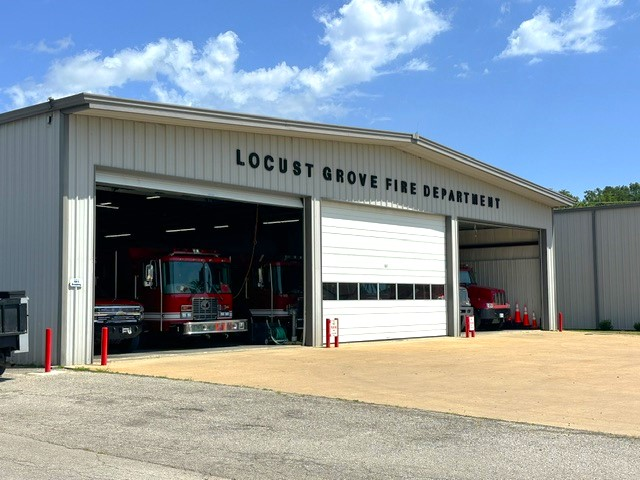
Locust Grove Fire Department in July, 2026

=== 2020 census ===
As of the 2020 census, Locust Grove had a population of 1,371. The median age was 35.6 years. 26.0% of residents were under the age of 18 and 14.7% of residents were 65 years of age or older. For every 100 females there were 88.8 males, and for every 100 females age 18 and over there were 87.1 males age 18 and over.

0.0% of residents lived in urban areas, while 100.0% lived in rural areas.

There were 544 households in Locust Grove, of which 34.6% had children under the age of 18 living in them. Of all households, 38.6% were married-couple households, 21.0% were households with a male householder and no spouse or partner present, and 33.5% were households with a female householder and no spouse or partner present. About 32.0% of all households were made up of individuals and 16.0% had someone living alone who was 65 years of age or older.

There were 627 housing units, of which 13.2% were vacant. The homeowner vacancy rate was 3.5% and the rental vacancy rate was 7.1%.

Racial composition as of the 2020 census
Race	Number	Percent
White	593	43.3%
Black or African American	5	0.4%
American Indian and Alaska Native	548	40.0%
Asian	5	0.4%
Native Hawaiian and Other Pacific Islander	0	0.0%
Some other race	3	0.2%
Two or more races	217	15.8%
Hispanic or Latino (of any race)	16	1.2%

=== 2010 census ===
As of the census of 2010, there were 5,200 people, 819 households, and 363 families residing in the town. The population density was 1,606.7 inhabitants per square mile (620.4/km^{2}). There were 567 housing units at an average density of 666.9 per square mile (257.5/km^{2}). The racial makeup of the town was 57.32% White, 32.50% Native American, 0.22% Asian, 0.81% from other races, and 9.15% from two or more races. Hispanic or Latino of any race were 2.42% of the population.

There were 519 households, out of which 38.9% had children under the age of 18 living with them, 47.4% were married couples living together, 17.7% had a female householder with no husband present, and 29.9% were non-families. 26.8% of all households were made up of individuals, and 16.0% had someone living alone who was 65 years of age or older. The average household size was 2.63 and the average family size was 3.14.

In the town, the population was spread out, with 32.1% under the age of 18, 12.2% from 18 to 24, 25.5% from 25 to 44, 16.7% from 45 to 64, and 13.6% who were 65 years of age or older. The median age was 29 years. For every 100 females, there were 90.8 males. For every 100 females age 18 and over, there were 80.9 males.

The median income for a household in the town was $20,655, and the median income for a family was $24,821. Males had a median income of $25,500 versus $16,389 for females. The per capita income for the town was $9,191. About 22.1% of families and 23.0% of the population were below the poverty line, including 28.8% of those under age 18 and 19.5% of those age 65 or over.

== Education ==
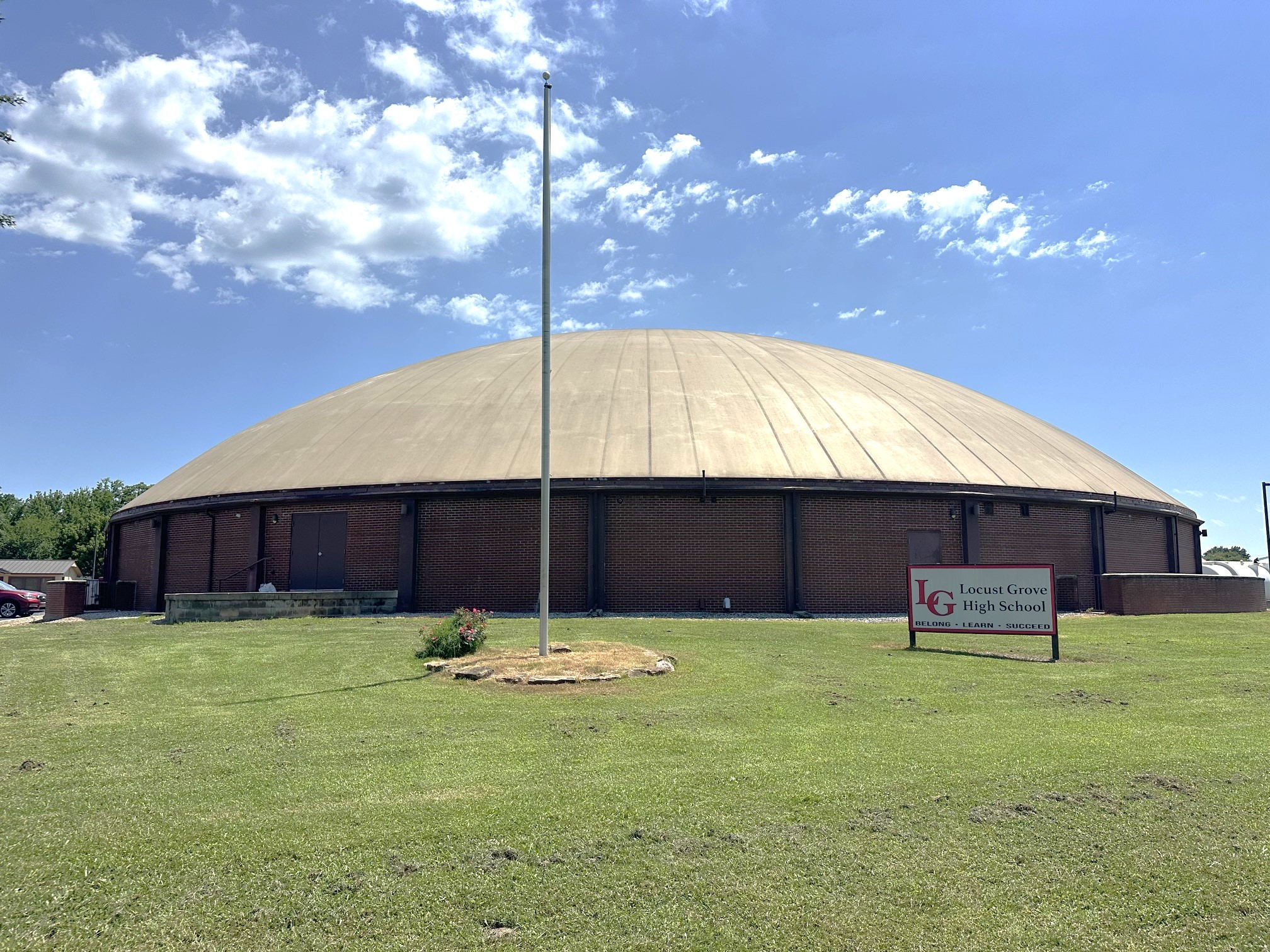
Locust Grove High School building in July, 2026

It is in the Locust Grove Public Schools school district, located in Locust Grove. It serves the students from Locust Grove and many other communities.

The school system consists of four different schools: The Early Learning Center (Pre-K through 1st Grade), the Upper Elementary (2nd through 5th grades), the Middle School (6th through 8th grades), and the High School (9th through 12th grades).

Locust Grove High School is steeped in tradition. Every year the first football game of the season is Locust Grove versus Salina in the Battle of 82 (highway).

== Points of interest ==
Locust Grove is 8 miles (13 km) west of the Saline Courthouse, the only remaining of nine rural Cherokee Nation courthouses built in the 1880s. The courthouse, near the Mayes/Delaware County line, was undergoing renovation in 2019.

The Willard Stone Museum is currently at his homeplace in Locust Grove. The museum's goal is to relocate to the historic building that housed the first bank in Locust Grove, located in downtown and built in 1912, to house the collection. In 2019, the museum's board of directors authorized build-out of the new facility, and in September 2020 launched a fundraising campaign to finance the needed renovations.

Locust Grove is home to the Rural Oklahoma Museum of Poetry (“ROMP”). After a temporary closure, ROMP re-opened in early February, 2026 in a new space at 114 E. Main St., with an exhibit on Rhyming and ROMPing on Route 66. The museum has regular hours, but can be available at any time for group tours.

Locust Grove is directly south of Lake Hudson, southwest of Lake W. R. Holway, formerly Chimney Rock Lake, and northeast of Fort Gibson Lake.

== Notable residents ==
- Ally Carter, author
- Bill Glass Jr., Cherokee Nation ceramic artist and sculptor
- Jeffrey Rowland, artist and CEO
- Willard Stone, Art Deco sculptor
