= Grand River (Oklahoma) =

River in Oklahoma, U.S.

Coordinates: 35°47′32″N 95°17′40″W

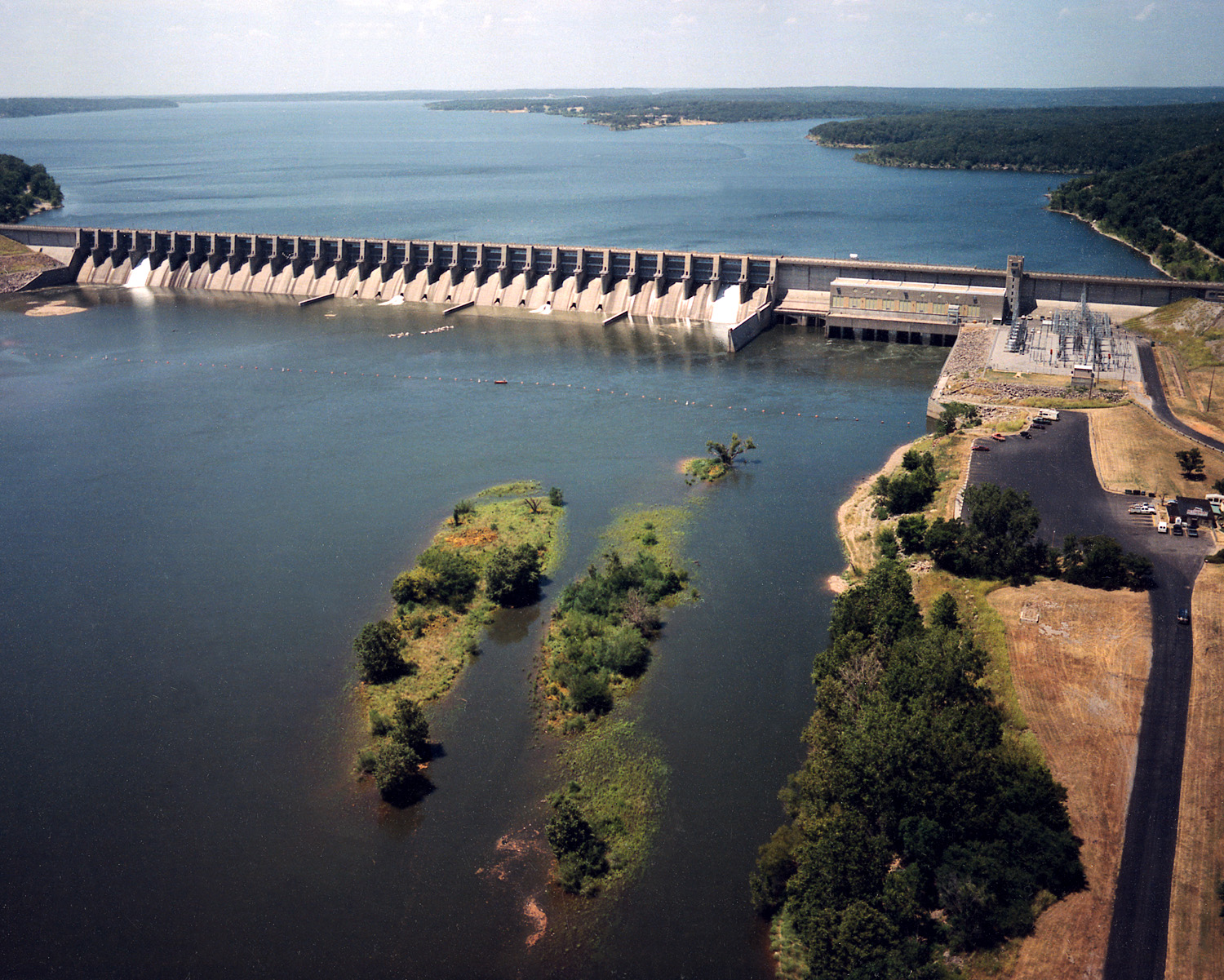
Aerial view of Fort Gibson Lake And Dam on the Grand River in Wagoner and Cherokee Counties, Oklahoma, USA

The Grand River is an alternate name for the lower section of the Neosho River, a tributary of the Arkansas River in Oklahoma. "Grand River" refers to the section of river below the confluence of the Neosho and Spring rivers in Ottawa County near Miami. It empties into the Arkansas northeast of Muskogee, just downstream from the confluence of the Verdigris River with the Arkansas. The area of convergence of the three rivers Arkansas, Verdigris and Neosho are called "Three Forks".

The river is impounded by Grand Lake, Lake Hudson, and Fort Gibson Reservoir. The Grand River Dam Authority administers the river.
