= Integris Health =

INTEGRIS Health Inc.
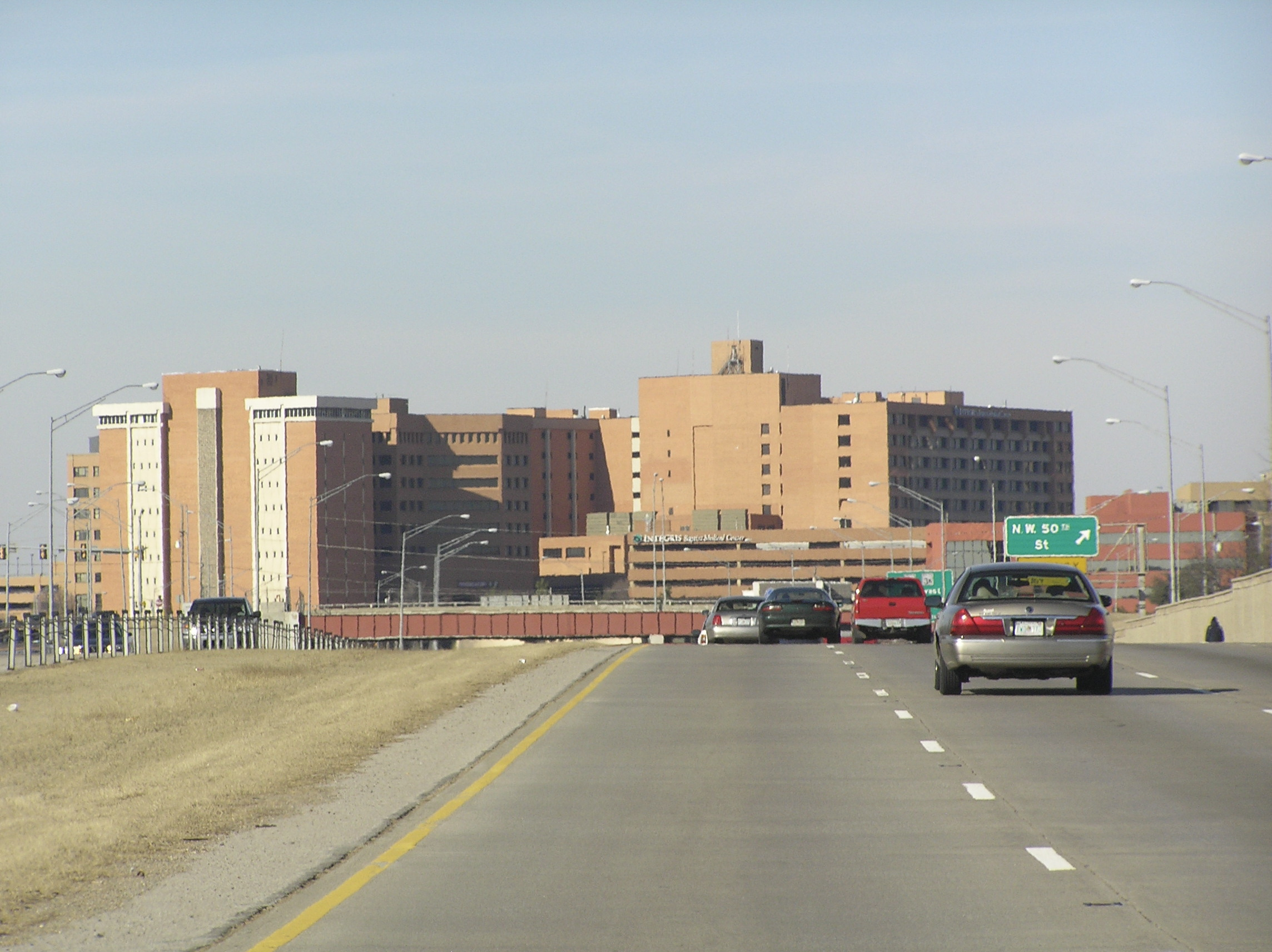
- Integris Baptist Medical Center

Geography
- Location: 3300 NW Expressway, Oklahoma City, OK 73112, Oklahoma City, Oklahoma, United States
- Coordinates: 35.5293°N 97.5763°W

History
- Founded: 1983

Links
- Website: integrishealth.org
- Lists: Hospitals in Oklahoma

Integris Health (stylized INTEGRIS Health) is an American 501(c)(3) not-for-profit organization which manages health care facilities in the state of Oklahoma. Through affiliates Integris Health Inc. operates 16 hospitals and has health providers in 49 Oklahoma towns and cities. The Integris facilities include hospitals, rehabilitation centers, physician clinics, pharmacies, mental health facilities, independent living centers, and home health agencies, located throughout Oklahoma.

== History ==
Integris Health was created in 1983 in order to serve as the parent corporation and to provide management and administrative support to Integris Baptist Medical Center Inc. However, the network of hospitals that now comprises Integris Health, was born out of a series of Oklahoma healthcare providers merging over the span of three years from 1992 to 1995, with additional hospitals brought on board later.

Integris's roots can be traced back to 1910, when a six-bedroom home in Enid, Oklahoma was transformed into Bass Baptist Health Center- a hospital that would eventually fall under the Integris name. Nine years later, Baptist Regional Health Center opened to serve the needs of lead and zinc miners.

Modern-day Integris began in 1946 when Dr. Andrew Potter and Dr. T. B. Lackey, both of the Baptist General Convention of Oklahoma, first proposed opening a Baptist hospital in Oklahoma City. On the Easter Sunday of 1959 this proposition came to fruition when Baptist Memorial Hospital opened its 200-bed facility in Oklahoma City. Sometimes called the "Hospital on the hill," Baptist Memorial Hospital sat atop an elevated area of land with little around it. Later in 1965, South Community Hospital was opened after hosting a fund drive to raise the money necessary the construction of the facility .

In 1972 Baptist Memorial Hospital was renamed Baptist Medical Center. Six years later in 1978, ownership of Baptist Medical Center was transferred from the Baptist General Convention of Oklahoma to the Oklahoma Healthcare Corporation. Then in 1992, South Community Hospital changed its name to Southwest Medical Center. Two years later the first of several mergers occurred with Oklahoma Healthcare Corporation joining with Baptist Healthcare of Oklahoma to form Oklahoma Health System. The next year in 1995, Southwest Medical Center merged with Oklahoma Health Systems and the new organization was renamed Integris Health.

Over the next few years Integris grew to encompass several regional hospitals. In 2001 Integris built their first hospital under the new name, adding Canadian Valley Hospital in Yukon, Oklahoma. In 2009 Integris created a partnership with ProCure Proton Therapy Center to create the Integris Cancer Institute of Oklahoma, a facility that is one of only 14 in the county to offer proton therapy. In 2011, Integris Health Edmond was opened and in 2013 Integris became the majority owner of Lakeside Women's Hospital, greatly increasing their women's services. Later in 2013, Integris became a preferred clinical affiliate of Access Medical Centers, offering patients an urgent care alternative to the emergency room.

In 2014, Integris launched an online video platform, integrishealth.tv to provide a place for patients and family members to learn about their services and educate the community about health issues.

Integris Health was formerly partnered with the National Basketball Association (NBA)'s Oklahoma City Thunder.

In August 2023 Integris Health signed a definitive agreement to acquire AllianceHealth Ponca City and the operational assets of AllianceHealth Woodward from Community Health Systems Inc. The acquisition was then completed in November of the same year.

== Locations ==
- INTEGRIS Baptist Medical Center
- INTEGRIS Baptist Medical Center Portland Avenue (formerly Deaconess Hospital)
- INTEGRIS Miami Hospital (formerly Baptist Regional Health Center)
- INTEGRIS Bass Baptist Health Center
- INTEGRIS Cancer Institute
- INTEGRIS Canadian Valley Hospital
- INTEGRIS Grove Hospital
- INTEGRIS Health Edmond
- INTEGRIS Southwest Medical Center
- Lakeside Women's Hospital
- Integris Health Woodward Hospital (formerly AllianceHealth Woodward)
- Integris Health Ponca City Hospital (formerly AllianceHealth Ponca City)

=== Cancer Institute ===
Integris Cancer Institute
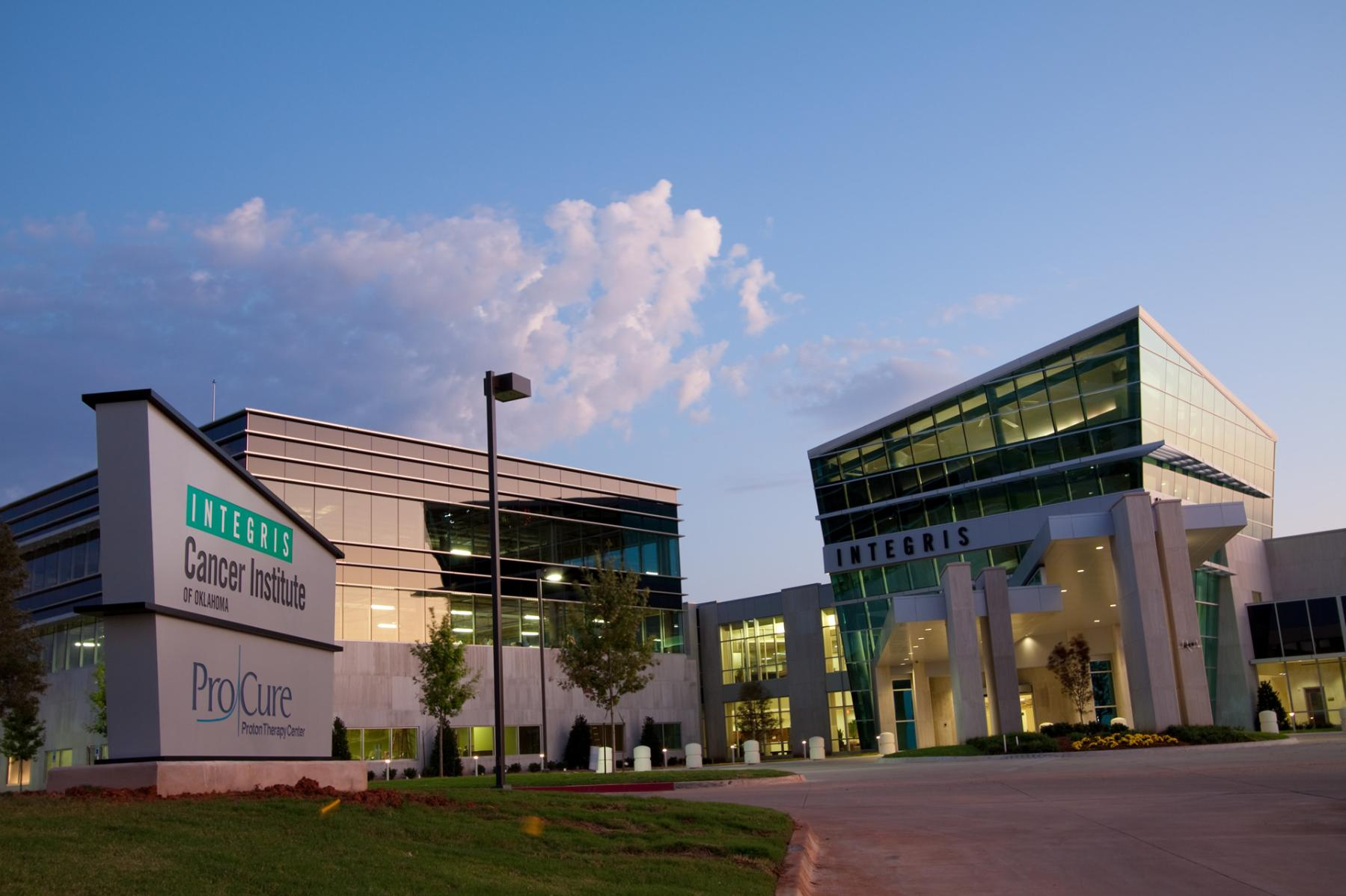

Geography
- Location: Oklahoma City, Oklahoma, United States
- Coordinates: 35°36′39″N 97°37′21″W

Links
- Website: Integrisok.com/icio
- Lists: Hospitals in Oklahoma

INTEGRIS Cancer Institute, is one of the 71 comprehensive cancer treatment centers in the United States, currently providing both conventional radiation therapy and proton therapy. ICI Proton Campus, including the ProCure Proton Therapy Center, at Oklahoma City, Oklahoma. ICIO offers the first Brainlab radiosurgery system to Oklahoma implementing with Varian Novalis Tx. ICIO serves more than 3.6 million people in the Southwest area, mainly Oklahoma, and residents from North Texas, Kansas, and Arkansas.

== Oklahoma firsts ==
- First to install cochlear implants in both adults and children and first double cochlear implant.
- First heart transplant.
- First in vitro fertilization baby.

== Community involvement ==
In January 1993 Integris opened a free, all volunteer healthcare clinic to provide healthcare to the un- and underinsured residents of Oklahoma. In 1995 Integris also created the Basic Education Empowerment Program (BEEP) to help at-risk youths turn their lives around. In July 2000 Integris took the unusual step of opening a charter elementary school, by transforming the struggling Western Village Academy into the Stanley Hupfeld Academy.
