= Southwest Medical Center =

Southwest Medical Center may refer to:

- INTEGRIS Southwest Medical Center in Oklahoma City, Oklahoma
- PeaceHealth Southwest Medical Center in Vancouver, Washington
- Memorial Hermann Southwest Hospital, also referred to as "Memorial Hermann Southwest Medical Center"
- Southwest Medical Center in Liberal, Kansas
