= Edmond Public Schools =

School district in Oklahoma

Coordinates: 35.667532°N 97.497471°W

Location
- 1001 West Danforth Road; Edmond, Oklahoma 73003 Oklahoma County United States of America

District information
- Type: Public, Primary, Secondary, Co-Educational
- Grades: Elementary Pre-K-5; Middle School 6–8; High School 9–12
- Superintendent: Dr. Josh Delich
- Schools: 27
- Budget: $151,383,000

Students and staff
- Students: 22,500
- Teachers: 1,130
- Student–teacher ratio: 18:1

Other information
- Website: www.edmondschools.net

Edmond Public Schools is a public school district located in the Oklahoma City suburb of Edmond, Oklahoma. As of October 2020, the school district has an enrollment of 23,496 students and employs over 3,000 people. Edmond Public Schools consists of 17 elementary schools, six middle schools, three high schools, an alternative school, a virtual school, and an early childhood center. Two new elementary schools, Redbud Elementary and Scissortail Elementary, opened in 2022.

In 2020, Bret Towne announced that he was retiring as superintendent at the end of the 2020–2021 school year.

== History ==
In 1889, Oklahoma's first public schoolhouse (not to be confused with Oklahoma's first school) was opened in Edmond. The project was funded by the Ladies School Aid Society, led by Jennie Forster. The first class of students attended school on September 16, 1889. Over the 1890s, the class size outgrew the original schoolhouse, which was sold in September 1899. Eventually, the status of the building was lost to time.

In 1997, the Edmond City Council approved an effort to investigate what happened to the schoolhouse. The Edmond Historic Preservation Trust led the investigation and eventual restoration of the schoolhouse was completed in April 2007.

== Boundary ==
Within Oklahoma County, the district includes most of Edmond, most of Arcadia, and portions of Oklahoma City. The district extends into Logan County.

Redbud Elementary School had a higher enrollment than its official capacity on the day it opened.

== Schools ==
Edmond Public Schools operates 17 elementary schools, six middle schools, and three high schools. Notable additions to the school district include Redbud Elementary and Scissortail Elementary, which opened in 2022.

=== High schools ===
- Edmond Memorial High School
- Edmond North High School
- Edmond Santa Fe High School

=== Middle schools ===
- Central Middle School
- Cheyenne Middle School
- Cimarron Middle School
- Heartland Middle School
- Sequoyah Middle School
- Summit Middle School

=== Elementary schools ===
- Angie Debo Elementary
- Charles Haskell Elementary
- Chisholm Elementary School
- Clegern Elementary School
- Cross Timbers Elementary
- Early Childhood Center
- Frontier Elementary
- Heritage Elementary School
- Ida Freeman Elementary School
- John Ross Elementary School
- Northern Hills Elementary School
- Orvis Risner Elementary
- Redbud Elementary
- Russell Dougherty Elementary
- Scissortail Elementary School
- Sunset Elementary School
- Washington Irving Elementary School
- West Field Elementary School
- Will Rogers Elementary School
