= Oklahoma Children's Hospital =

- OU Health
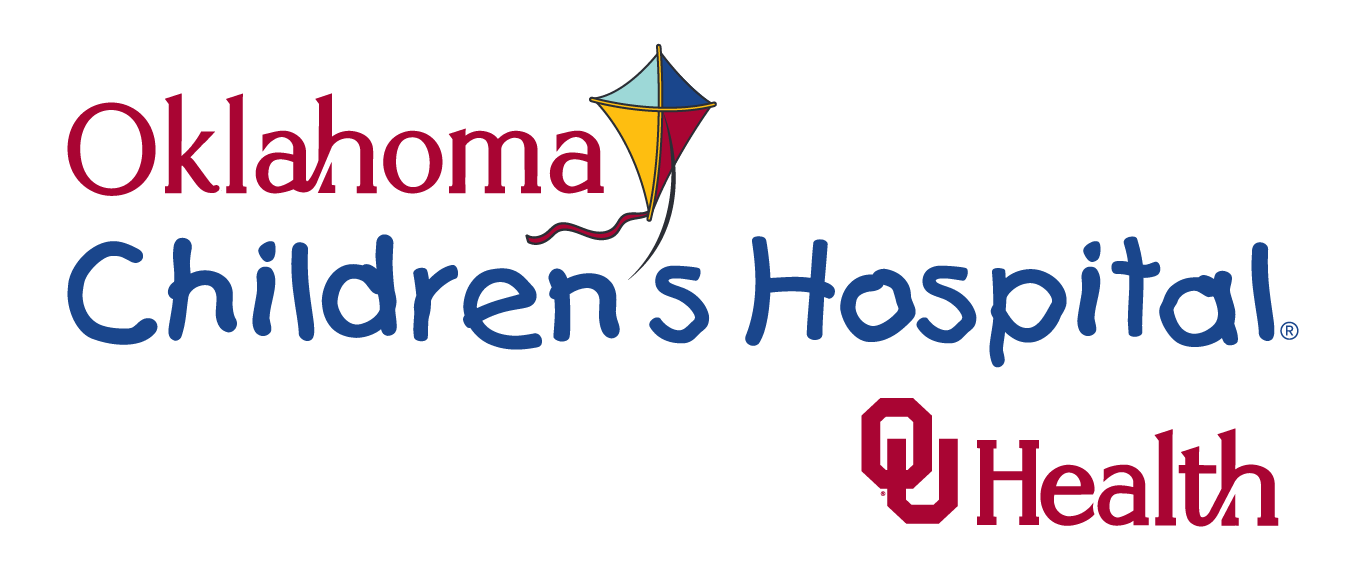

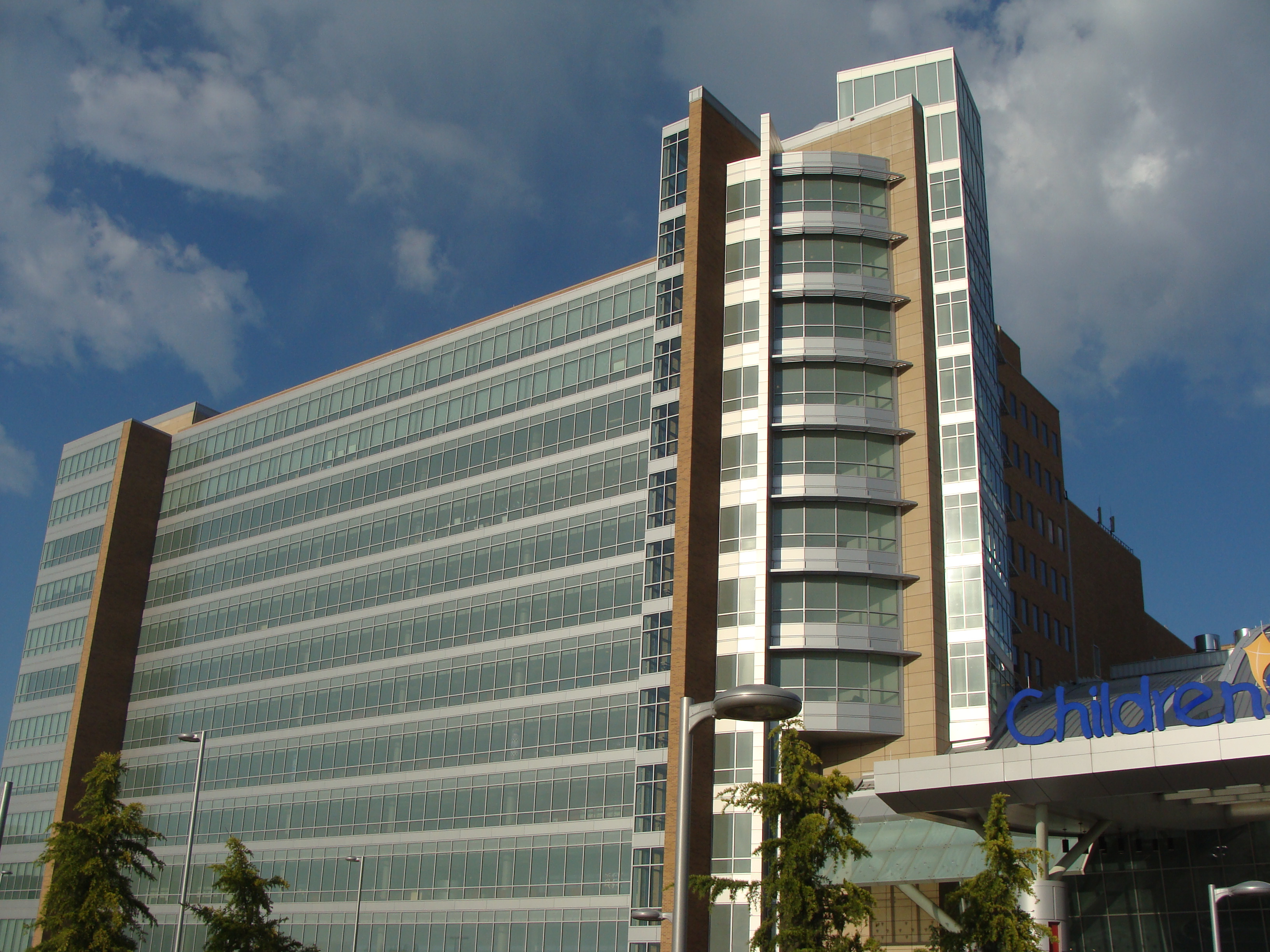
- A view of the Atrium at Oklahoma Children's Hospital OU Health.

Geography
- Location: 1200 Children's Ave, Oklahoma City, Oklahoma, United States
- Coordinates: 35.480796°N 97.497039°W

Organization
- Type: Children's hospital
- Affiliated university: University of Oklahoma College of Medicine

Services
- Emergency department: Level 1 Pediatric Trauma Center
- Beds: 246

Helipads
- Helipad: FAA LID: 9OK1

History
- Opened: April 2011

Links
- Website: www.ouhealth.com/oklahoma-childrens-hospital/
- Lists: Hospitals in Oklahoma

Oklahoma Children's Hospital OU Health (formerly known as The Children's Hospital of Oklahoma, Children’s Memorial Hospital, and The Children's Hospital at OU Medicine) is a nationally ranked, freestanding acute care children's hospital in Oklahoma City, Oklahoma. It is the state's only comprehensive pediatric hospital and is part of Oklahoma's flagship academic health system, OU Health. The hospital is affiliated with the University of Oklahoma College of Medicine. The hospital features all private rooms that consist of 246 pediatric beds. The hospital provides comprehensive pediatric specialties and subspecialties to infants, children, teens, and young adults aged 0–21 throughout the region. The hospital also sometimes treats adults that require pediatric care. The hospital has a rooftop helipad and is an ACS verified level 1 pediatric trauma center, the only one in Oklahoma. The hospital features a regional pediatric intensive-care unit and an American Academy of Pediatrics verified level IV neonatal intensive care unit.

== History ==
Oklahoma Children's Hospital OU Health traces its origins to 1928, when it was established as the Hospital for Crippled Children, part of the University of Oklahoma School of Medicine’s University Hospital in Oklahoma City. The hospital was created to serve children with orthopedic needs, particularly those from underserved populations.

During the polio epidemic of the mid-20th century, the need for a modern pediatric facility became evident. In 1956, the hospital became part of the newly designated University of Oklahoma Medical Center, and in 1957, it was renamed Oklahoma Children’s Memorial Hospital.

Key milestones in the hospital’s development include:

- 1959 – Oklahoma’s first open-heart surgery and the first use of a locally designed heart-lung machine.
- 1961 – Establishment of the Birth Defect Center, partially funded by the March of Dimes.
- 1977–1979 – Expansion with the Garrison and Nicholson Towers, adding inpatient beds, intensive care units, therapy departments, and educational services.
- 1981 – Opening of the Don H. O’Donoghue Rehabilitation Institute, including a rooftop playground and convalescent care for patients up to age 21.
- 1982 – Construction of a rooftop heliport and launch of Medi Flight air ambulance service.
- 1984 – Installation of one of Oklahoma’s first MRI machines.
- 1987 – First conjoined twin separation surgery performed at the hospital.
- 1994 – Opening of the Jimmy Everest Center for Cancer and Blood Disorders in Children.
- 2001 – Rebranded as The Children's Hospital at OU Medical Center.
- 2020 – Renamed Oklahoma Children's Hospital OU Health as part of a unified brand launch for OU Health, combining OU Medicine and the University of Oklahoma Health Sciences Center.
- 2023 – OU Health broke ground on a new pediatric behavioral health center, the first of its kind in Oklahoma. The $140 million, 172,755-square-foot facility will include 72 beds for short- and long-term mental health care, with completion expected in December 2026. The project is funded through a combination of state appropriations, federal pandemic relief funds, and private donations.
- 2024 – Performed the first pediatric heart transplant in Oklahoma in over 30 years, establishing the state’s only pediatric heart transplant program.

== Care Units ==
Oklahoma Children's Hospital OU Health has the only American Academy of Pediatrics verified level IV neonatal intensive care unit (NICU) in the state and the greater region of the midwest. Critically ill newborns from all over the region are transported to the NICU from smaller hospitals that are not equipped to treat these patients. The hospital has expanded its network of Level IV NICUs to include a location in Stillwater, Oklahoma.

Oklahoma Children's Hospital OU Health features the only 24/7 pediatric emergency room in Oklahoma City and the only American College of Surgeons verified level 1 pediatric trauma center in the state of Oklahoma. The verification was renewed in January, 2020. Oklahoma Children's Hospital OU Health is also part of the national Pediatric Pandemic Network.

In October 2024, Oklahoma Children's Hospital OU Health performed its first pediatric heart transplant in more than 30 years, becoming the only pediatric heart transplant center in Oklahoma. The procedure was the result of a decade-long effort to build a comprehensive pediatric cardiac program, including the establishment of a dedicated pediatric cardiac intensive care unit and recruitment of nationally recognized specialists.

== Awards and recognition ==
Oklahoma Children's Hospital OU Health is consistently recognized for its high-quality care. In the 2024-2025 rankings, U.S. News & World Report recognized the hospital as one of the top 50 children's hospitals in the United States for pediatric cardiology and heart surgery. This marked another year of national recognition in this specialty, as the hospital also earned a Top 50 ranking in 2023 for both Pediatric Cardiology & Heart Surgery and Pediatric Gastroenterology & GI Surgery.

In April 2025, the hospital's pediatric urology clinic was accredited by the Spina Bifida Association (SBA) as a Clinic Care Partner, recognizing its national leadership in spina bifida care. In 2020, the Oklahoma Perinatal Quality Improvement Collaborative awarded the hospital the Spotlight Hospital Award for its excellence in perinatal care. In 2012, the Mother & Baby Center at Oklahoma Children's Hospital received an "Excellence in Patient Care" award from the healthcare firm Studer Group.

== Gallery ==
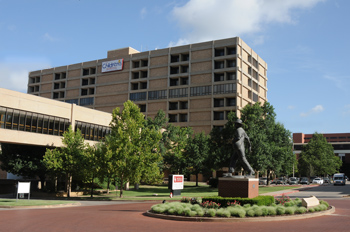
An exterior view of Oklahoma Children's Hospital.

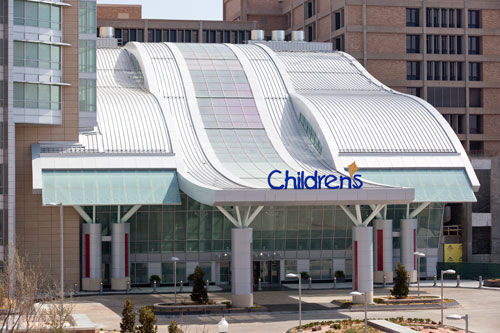
A view of the Atrium at Oklahoma Children's Hospital.

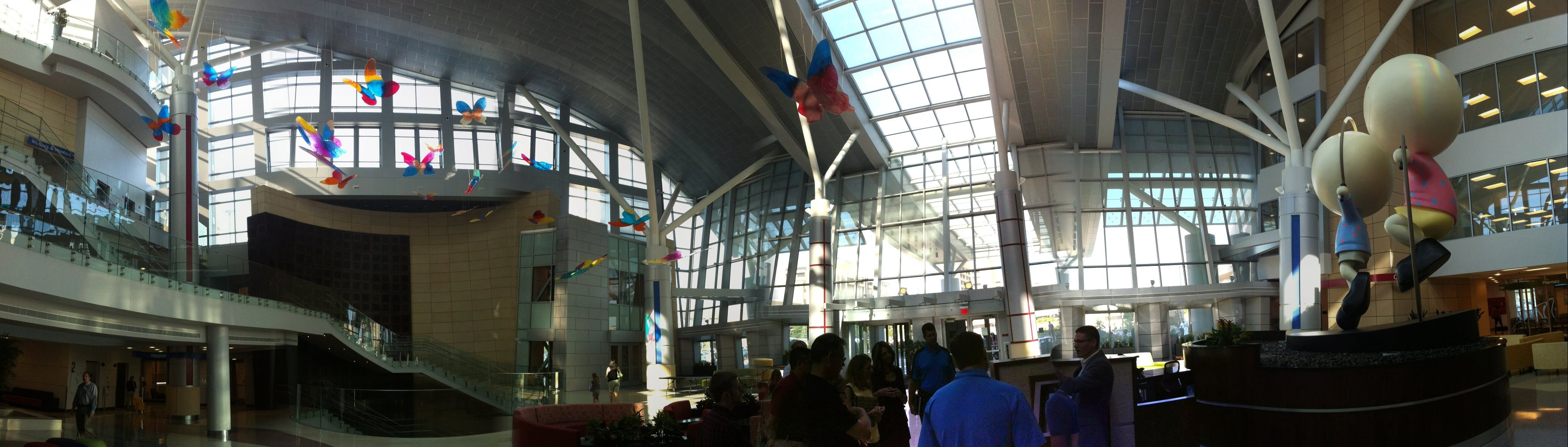
An interior view of the atrium of Oklahoma Children's Hospital.

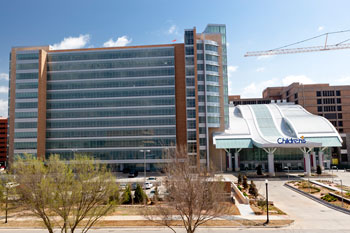

== See also ==
- University of Oklahoma College of Medicine
- List of children's hospitals in the United States
- University of Oklahoma
- OU Health
