= St. Mary's Regional Medical Center (Enid) =

Geography
- Location: Enid, Oklahoma, Northwest Oklahoma, Oklahoma, United States
- Coordinates: 36°23′37″N 97°52′16″W

Services
- Beds: 245

History
- Founded: 1915

Links
- Website: http://www.stmarysregional.com
- Lists: Hospitals in Oklahoma

St. Mary's Regional Medical Center is a hospital located in Enid, Oklahoma.

== History ==
It was founded in 1915 as Enid Government Springs Sanatorium by Dr. G.A. Boyle and Dr. T.B. Hinson. In 1921, Boyle retired, leaving Hinson in charge. Ownership and operations were transferred to the Sisters Adorers of the Precious Blood on June 1, 1937. Hinson died in 1938, and the hospital was renamed St. Mary's Springs Hospital. The hospital trained nurses at Enid High School from 1915 to 1951, and at Phillips University from 1971 to 1973. The hospital undertook renovations and expansions in 1939, 1949, 1953, 1963, 1966, 1968, 1972, and 1982. Flooding damaged the hospital in 1947 and 1957. On October 11, 1973, Boggy Creek flooded the hospital and parking lots, after 17 inches of rain fell within 8 hours.

== Current operations ==
The Adorers of Wichita sponsored the hospital from 1937 to 1995, which was the longest in their history. The Sisters of Mercy Health System based in Saint Louis gained ownership in 1995, calling the hospital St. Mary's Mercy Hospital. The hospital is currently owned by Universal Health Services, since 2000, having previously leased it from the Adorers in 1985.
