= Mazie, Oklahoma =

- Census-designated place
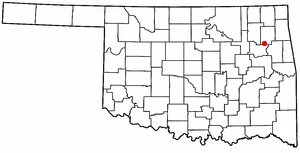
- Location in Oklahoma
- Coordinates: 36°08′33″N 95°19′49″W
- Country: United States
- State: Oklahoma
- County: Mayes

Area
  - Total: 2.29 sq mi (5.92 km^{2})
  - Land: 2.29 sq mi (5.92 km^{2})
  - Water: 0 sq mi (0.00 km^{2})
- Elevation: 614 ft (187 m)

Population (2020)
  - Total: 74
  - Density: 32/sq mi (12.5/km^{2})
- Time zone: UTC-6 (Central (CST))
  - Summer (DST): UTC-5 (CDT)
- ZIP Code: 74337
- Area codes: 539/918
- FIPS code: 40-47200
- GNIS feature ID: 2408193

Mazie is an unincorporated community and census-designated place (CDP) in Mayes County, Oklahoma, United States. The population of the CDP was 74 at the 2020 census, down from 91 in 2010.

== Geography ==
The unincorporated community of Mazie is along U.S. Route 69, 5 miles (8 km) south of Chouteau and 11 miles (18 km) north of Wagoner. The Mazie CDP is northeast of the community of Mazie, about 3 miles (5 km) south-southeast of Chouteau.

According to the U.S. Census Bureau, the CDP has a total area of 2.3 square miles (6.0 km^{2}), all land.

The Union Mission Site, about 5 miles (8 km) northeast of Mazie and about 3 miles (5 km) southeast of the Mazie CDP, is listed on the National Register of Historic Places.

== Demographics ==
Historical population
Census	Pop.	Note	%±
2000	88		—
2010	91		3.4%
2020	74		−18.7%
U.S. Decennial Census

=== 2020 census ===
As of the 2020 census, Mazie had a population of 74. The median age was 53.3 years. 9.5% of residents were under the age of 18 and 31.1% of residents were 65 years of age or older. For every 100 females there were 111.4 males, and for every 100 females age 18 and over there were 123.3 males age 18 and over.

0.0% of residents lived in urban areas, while 100.0% lived in rural areas.

There were 26 households in Mazie, of which 15.4% had children under the age of 18 living in them. Of all households, 42.3% were married-couple households, 0.0% were households with a male householder and no spouse or partner present, and 53.8% were households with a female householder and no spouse or partner present. About 46.2% of all households were made up of individuals and 42.3% had someone living alone who was 65 years of age or older.

There were 37 housing units, of which 29.7% were vacant. The homeowner vacancy rate was 0.0% and the rental vacancy rate was 0.0%.

Racial composition as of the 2020 census
Race	Number	Percent
White	39	52.7%
Black or African American	3	4.1%
American Indian and Alaska Native	10	13.5%
Asian	1	1.4%
Native Hawaiian and Other Pacific Islander	0	0.0%
Some other race	1	1.4%
Two or more races	20	27.0%
Hispanic or Latino (of any race)	1	1.4%

=== 2000 census ===
As of the census of 2000, there were 88 people, 39 households, and 26 families residing in the CDP. The population density was 38.0 inhabitants per square mile (14.7/km^{2}). There were 40 housing units at an average density of 17.3/sq mi (6.7/km^{2}). The racial makeup of the CDP was 82.95% White, 9.09% African American, 5.68% Native American, and 2.27% from two or more races.

There were 39 households, out of which 30.8% had children under the age of 18 living with them, 56.4% were married couples living together, 7.7% had a female householder with no husband present, and 33.3% were non-families. 33.3% of all households were made up of individuals, and 15.4% had someone living alone who was 65 years of age or older. The average household size was 2.26 and the average family size was 2.88.

In the CDP, the population was spread out, with 21.6% under the age of 18, 6.8% from 18 to 24, 22.7% from 25 to 44, 35.2% from 45 to 64, and 13.6% who were 65 years of age or older. The median age was 44 years. For every 100 females, there were 87.2 males. For every 100 females age 18 and over, there were 86.5 males.

The median income for a household in the CDP was $12,000, and the median income for a family was $50,556. Males had a median income of $9,375 versus $26,250 for females. The per capita income for the CDP was $15,506. There were 41.7% of families and 37.2% of the population living below the poverty line, including 53.3% of under eighteens and none of those over 64.

== Education ==
It is in the Chouteau-Mazie Public Schools school district.
