= Oklahoma Hospital Association =

Hospital association in Oklahoma, United States

The Oklahoma Hospital Association (OHA) is the state affiliate of the American Hospital Association. It was established on May 21, 1919, after meeting of representatives from 20 Oklahoma hospitals, electing Dr. Fred S. Clinton as the first president. He served as president for the first nine years of the organization's existence. Today, OHA represents more than 150 hospitals and health care entities, such as nursing homes, home health agencies, surgery centers, and medical supply businesses in the U.S. state of Oklahoma.

== Objective ==
OHA's stated objective is to "improve the general welfare of the public by leading and assisting its members to provide better health care services for all people."

== Services ==
Services include legislative tracking and representation, communications, educational programs, health care industry information and data, and quality and risk management resources. In conjunction with other organizations OHA has worked on workforce shortage initiatives.

== See also ==
- American Hospital Association
- List of hospitals in Oklahoma
