= List of hospitals in Oklahoma =

List of hospitals in Oklahoma (U.S. state), sorted by hospital name.

== A ==
- AllianceHealth Clinton – Clinton
- AllianceHealth Durant – Durant
- AllianceHealth Madill – Madill
- AllianceHealth Midwest – Midwest City
- AllianceHealth Ponca City – Ponca City
- AllianceHealth Seminole – Seminole
- AllianceHealth Woodward – Woodward
- AMG Specialty Hospital At Mercy – Edmond
- Arbuckle Memorial Hospital – Sulphur
- Ascension St. John Broken Arrow – Broken Arrow
- Ascension St. John Jane Phillips – Bartlesville
- Ascension St. John Medical Center – Tulsa
- Ascension St. John Nowata – Nowata
- Ascension St. John Owasso – Owasso
- Ascension St. John Sapulpa – Sapulpa
- Atoka County Medical Center – Atoka

== B ==
- Bailey Medical Center – Owasso, Oklahoma
- Beaver County Memorial Hospital – Beaver
- Bone and Joint Hospital – Oklahoma City
- Bristow Medical Center – Bristow
- Brookhaven Hospital – Tulsa

== C ==
- Cancer Treatment Centers of America – Tulsa
- Carl Albert Community Mental Health Center – McAlester
- Carnegie Tri-County Municipal Hospital – Carnegie, Oklahoma
- Cedar Ridge Hospital – Oklahoma City
- Chickasaw Nation Medical Center – Ada
- The Children's Center Rehabilitation Hospital – Bethany
- Choctaw Memorial Hospital – Hugo
- Choctaw Nation Health Care Center – Talihina
- Cimarron Memorial Hospital – Boise City
- Claremore Indian Hospital – Claremore
- Cleveland Area Hospital – Cleveland
- Comanche County Memorial Hospital – Lawton
- Community Hospital – Oklahoma City
- Community Hospital – North Campus – Oklahoma City
- Cordell Memorial Hospital – Cordell
- Cornerstone Specialty Hospitals Shawnee – Shawnee
- Cornerstone Specialty Hospitals Muskogee – Muskogee
- Creek Nation Community Hospital – Okemah
- Curahealth Hospital Oklahoma City – South Campus – Oklahoma City
- Curahealth Hospital Oklahoma City – Oklahoma City

== D ==
- Deaconess Hospital – Oklahoma City
- Drumright Regional Hospital – Drumright
- Duncan Regional Hospital – Duncan

== E ==
- Eastern Oklahoma Medical Center – Poteau
- Elkview General Hospital – Hobart

== F ==
- Fairfax Community Hospital – Fairfax
- Fairview Regional Medical Center – Fairview

== G ==
- Grady Memorial Hospital – Chickasha
- Great Plains Regional Medical Center – Elk City
- Griffin Memorial Hospital – Norman

== H ==
- Harmon Memorial Hospital – Hollis
- Harper County Community Hospital – Buffalo
- Haskell County Community Hospital – Stigler
- Hillcrest Hospital Claremore – Claremore
- Hillcrest Hospital Cushing – Cushing
- Hillcrest Hospital Henryetta – Henryetta
- Hillcrest Hospital Pryor – Pryor
- Hillcrest Hospital South (was SouthCrest Hospital) – Tulsa
- Hillcrest Medical Center – Tulsa
- Holdenville General Hospital – Holdenville

== I ==
- Inspire Specialty Hospital – Midwest City
- INTEGRIS Baptist Medical Center – Oklahoma City
- INTEGRIS Bass Baptist Health Center – Enid
- INTEGRIS Bass Pavilion – Enid
- INTEGRIS Canadian Valley Hospital – Yukon
- INTEGRIS Community Hospital At Council Crossing – Oklahoma City
- INTEGRIS Grove Hospital – Grove
- INTEGRIS Health Edmond – Edmond
- INTEGRIS Jim Thorpe Rehabilitation – Oklahoma City
- INTEGRIS Miami Hospital – Miami
- INTEGRIS Southwest Medical Center – Oklahoma City

== J ==
- Jackson C. Memorial VA Medical Center – Muskogee
- Jackson County Memorial Hospital – Altus
- JD McCarty Center for Children – Norman
- Jefferson County Hospital – Waurika
- Jim Taliaferro Community Mental Health Center – Lawton

== L ==
- Lakeside Women's Hospital – Oklahoma City
- Laureate Psychiatric Clinic and Hospital – Tulsa
- Lawton Indian Hospital – Lawton
- Lindsay Municipal Hospital – Lindsay

== M ==
- Mangum Regional Medical Center – Mangum
- Mary Hurley Hospital – Coalgate
- McAlester Regional Health Center – McAlester
- McBride Orthopedic Hospital – Oklahoma City
- McCurtain Memorial Hospital – Idabel
- Medical Center of Southeastern OK – Durant
- Memorial Hospital of Stilwell – Stilwell
- Memorial Hospital of Texas County – Guymon
- Mercy Health Love County – Marietta
- Mercy Hospital Ada – Ada
- Mercy Hospital Ardmore – Ardmore
- Mercy Hospital Healdton – Healdton
- Mercy Hospital Kingfisher – Kingfisher
- Mercy Hospital Logan County – Guthrie
- Mercy Hospital Oklahoma City – Oklahoma City
- Mercy Hospital Tishomingo – Tishomingo
- Mercy Hospital Watonga – Watonga
- Mercy Rehabilitation Hospital Oklahoma City – Oklahoma City
- Muscogee (Creek) Nation Medical Center – Okmulgee
- Muscogee (Creek) Nation Physical Rehabilitation – Okmulgee

== N ==
- Newman Memorial Hospital – Shattuck
- Norman Regional HealthPlex – Norman
- Norman Regional Hospital Porter Campus – Norman
- Norman Regional Hospital Moore – Moore
- Norman Specialty Hospital – Norman
- Northeastern Health System – Tahlequah
- Northeastern Health System Sequoyah – Sequoyah
- Northwest Center for Behavioral Health – Woodward
- Northwest Surgical Hospital – Oklahoma City

== O ==
- Oakwood Springs – Oklahoma City
- OK Center for Orthopaedic & Multi-Specialty Hospital – Oklahoma City
- Okeene Municipal Hospital – Okeene
- Oklahoma ER & Hospital – Edmond
- Oklahoma Forensic Center – Vinita
- Oklahoma City Veterans Administration Hospital – Oklahoma City
- Oklahoma Heart Hospital – Oklahoma City
- Oklahoma Hearth Hospital South – Oklahoma City
- Oklahoma Spine Hospital – Oklahoma City
- Oklahoma State University Medical Center – Tulsa
- Oklahoma Surgical Hospital – Tulsa
- OneCore Health – Oklahoma City
- OU Medical Center – Oklahoma City
- OU Medical Center – Edmond
- OU Medical Center, The Children's Hospital – Oklahoma City

== P ==
- Parkside Psychiatric Hospital Clinic – Tulsa
- Pawhuska Hospital – Pawhuska
- Physicians Hospital in Anadarko – Anadarko
- Post Acute Medical Rehabilitation Hospital of Tulsa – Tulsa
- Prague Community Hospital – Prague
- Purcell Municipal Hospital – Purcell
- Pushmataha Hospital – Antlers

== R ==
- Roger Mills Memorial Hospital – Cheyenne
- Rolling Hills Hospital – Ada

== S ==
- Saint Francis Hospital – Tulsa
- Saint Francis Hospital Muskogee – Muskogee
- Saint Francis Hospital South – Tulsa
- Saint Francis Hospital Vinita – Vinita
- Seiling Regional Medical Center – Seiling
- Select Specialty Hospital Oklahoma City – Oklahoma City
- Select Specialty Hospital in Tulsa – Tulsa
- Share Medical Center – Alva
- Southwestern Medical Center – Lawton
- Southwestern Regional Medical Center – Tulsa
- St. Anthony Hospital – Oklahoma City
- St. Anthony Hospital Shawnee – Shawnee
- St. John Rehabilitation Hospital/Encompass Health – Broken Arrow
- St. Mary's Regional Medical Center – Enid
- Stillwater Medical Blackwell – Blackwell
- Stillwater Medical Center – Stillwater
- Stillwater Medical Perry – Perry
- Stroud Regional Medical Center – Stroud
- Summit Medical Center – Edmond
- Surgical Hospital of Oklahoma – Oklahoma City

== T ==
- Tulsa Center for Behavioral Health – Tulsa
- Tulsa ER & Hospital – Tulsa
- Tulsa Spine & Specialty Hospital – Tulsa

== V ==
- Valir Rehabilitation Hospital – Oklahoma City
- Veterans Affairs Medical Center of Oklahoma City – Oklahoma City

== W ==
- Wagoner Community Hospital – Wagoner
- Weatherford Regional Hospital – Weatherford
- Willow Crest Hospital – Miami
- WW Hastings Indian Hospital – Tahlequah

== See also ==
- American Hospital Association
- List of hospitals in the United States
- Oklahoma Hospital Association
