= OU Health =

Geography
- Location: Oklahoma Health Center, Oklahoma City, Oklahoma, United States
- Coordinates: 35°28′49″N 97°29′47″W

Organization
- Type: Teaching
- Affiliated university: University of Oklahoma College of Medicine

Services
- Emergency department: Level I trauma center
- Speciality: Oncology, Children's hospital

History
- Opened: 1910 (as Presbyterian Hospital)

Links
- Website: www.ouhealth.com
- Lists: Hospitals in Oklahoma

OU Health is Oklahoma’s only comprehensive academic health system, formed in 2020 through the unification of OU Medicine and the University of Oklahoma Health Sciences Center. Headquartered in Oklahoma City, OU Health includes three hospitals—University of Oklahoma Medical Center, Oklahoma Children's Hospital OU Health, and OU Health Edmond Medical Center—as well as dozens of clinics and specialty centers across the state.

With more than 13,000 employees and over 1,300 physicians and advanced practice providers, OU Health delivers care in more than 75 adult and pediatric specialties and subspecialties. It is the clinical partner of the University of Oklahoma College of Medicine and is closely affiliated with the university’s seven health professional colleges, which educate more than 4,000 students and residents annually.

As an academic health system, OU Health integrates patient care, medical education, and research to improve health outcomes statewide. Its facilities include Oklahoma’s only Level I trauma center, the state’s only National Cancer Institute-Designated cancer center, and the state’s most comprehensive pediatric hospital.

OU Health is also the official healthcare partner of the Oklahoma City Thunder, supporting community health initiatives and fan engagement events across the state.

== History ==
OU Health traces its roots to the founding of the University of Oklahoma College of Medicine in 1900, which laid the foundation for academic medicine in the state. Over the following decades, the university expanded its health sciences programs and clinical partnerships, eventually forming a major academic medical center in Oklahoma City.

In 1998, the state of Oklahoma entered into a joint operating agreement with Columbia/HCA, a for-profit hospital management company, transferring management of the OU Medical Center to HCA Healthcare as part of a privatization effort. This arrangement was intended to bring private-sector efficiencies to the state-run hospitals.

A major shift occurred in 2018 when OU Medicine Inc., a newly formed nonprofit organization, acquired the hospitals from HCA for $750 million, returning them to local ownership and control. This transition allowed profits to be reinvested into the health system and enabled greater alignment with the University of Oklahoma’s academic and research missions.

In 2020, OU Medicine and the University of Oklahoma Health Sciences Center unified under a single brand: OU Health. This merger created Oklahoma’s first fully integrated academic health system, aligning hospitals, clinics, research, and education under one enterprise.

The integration brought together clinical care, research, and education under a single leadership and operational structure, enabling OU Health to deliver research-driven, patient-centered care while training the next generation of healthcare professionals.

In the same year, OU Health completed the largest hospital expansion project in Oklahoma history with the opening of the new North Tower at University of Oklahoma Medical Center. The 450,000-square-foot, eight-story facility added 144 beds, 32 operating rooms, and advanced technologies to support complex surgical care, trauma services, and cancer treatment.

== OU Health University of Oklahoma Medical Center ==
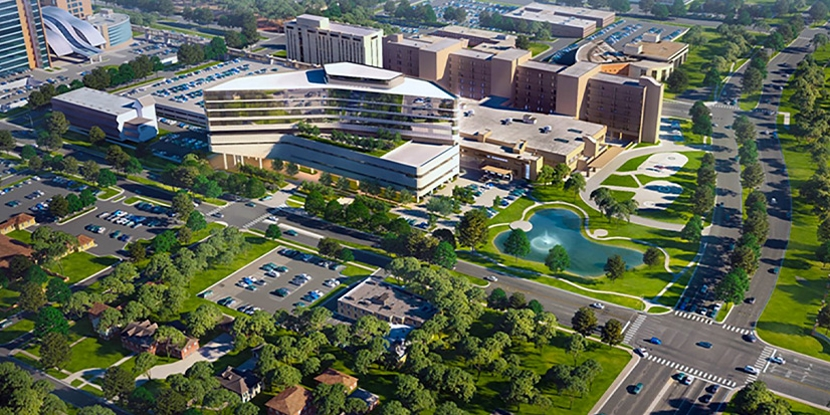
Aerial View of OU Health University of Oklahoma Medical Center in Oklahoma City.

The University of Oklahoma Medical Center is the flagship adult hospital of OU Health and the largest hospital in the state. Located on the Oklahoma Health Center campus in Oklahoma City, it serves as the primary teaching hospital for the University of Oklahoma College of Medicine. The facility includes the historic Presbyterian Tower and the North Tower, which opened in 2020 as part of a major expansion to support advanced surgical and trauma care. It is home to Oklahoma’s only Level I trauma center, verified by the American College of Surgeons.

== OU Health Edmond Medical Center ==
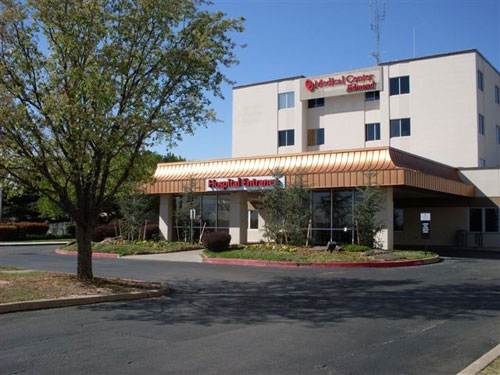
OU Health Edmond Medical Center campus.

OU Health Edmond Medical Center is located in central Edmond, Oklahoma just east of the University of Central Oklahoma campus. OU Health Edmond Medical Center has served the people of Edmond and surrounding areas for more than 75 years, originally opening as Edmond Hospital in 1947. The hospital offers a range of inpatient and outpatient services, including emergency care, surgical services, diagnostic imaging, and geriatric behavioral health. It continues to provide high-quality care with the support of Oklahoma’s academic health enterprise.

== Oklahoma Children's Hospital OU Health ==
Oklahoma Children's Hospital is the state’s only freestanding, comprehensive pediatric hospital and a nationally recognized leader in pediatric care. Located at the Oklahoma Health Center in Oklahoma City, the hospital provides specialized care in more than 50 pediatric specialties and subspecialties. It is home to Oklahoma’s only Level I pediatric trauma center, the highest level of neonatal intensive care in the state, and the state’s only comprehensive pediatric heart and heart surgery program. The hospital serves patients from birth through young adulthood and is affiliated with the University of Oklahoma College of Medicine for pediatric training and research. The hospital will celebrate its 100th anniversary in 2028.

== OU Health Stephenson Cancer Center ==
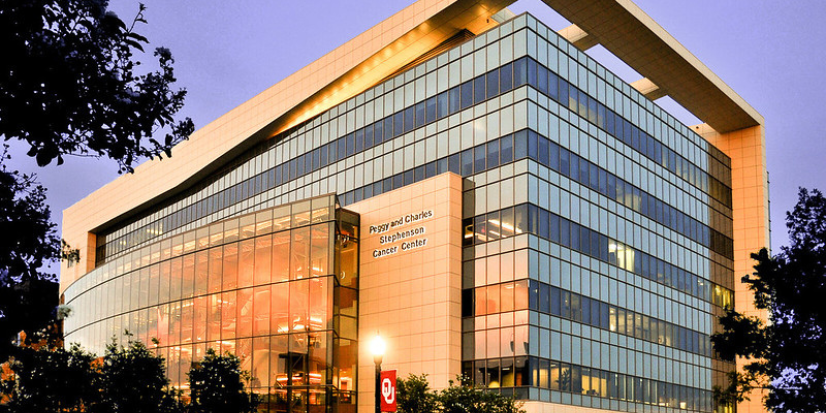
OU Health Stephenson Cancer Center in Oklahoma City as seen from the Oklahoma Health Center campus.

OU Health Stephenson Cancer Center, located at the Oklahoma Health Center in Oklahoma City, is Oklahoma’s only National Cancer Institute (NCI)-Designated Cancer Center. It opened in 2011 and achieved NCI designation in 2018, placing it among the top 2% of cancer centers in the United States. In 2023, the center successfully renewed its NCI designation following a rigorous five-year review process.

The center is named in honor of Peggy and Charles Stephenson, longtime supporters of the University of Oklahoma and champions of cancer research. In 2019, the Stephensons and the Stephenson Family Foundation made a transformative $20 million gift to the OU Foundation to expand the center’s research mission. Their generosity supports the recruitment of world-class scientists, the creation of five new endowed chairs in cancer research, and the renovation of laboratory space with state-of-the-art technology. The gift also advances the center’s pursuit of Comprehensive Cancer Center status from the NCI, a distinction that recognizes the highest level of research excellence and collaboration.

As part of the University of Oklahoma’s strategic plan, the center plays a leading role in expanding cancer research and improving access to advanced therapies across the state. It supports more than 300 active clinical trials, including the only Phase I clinical trials program in Oklahoma, and has significantly increased federal research funding, with more than $60 million annually supporting over 400 research projects.

== OU Health Physicians ==
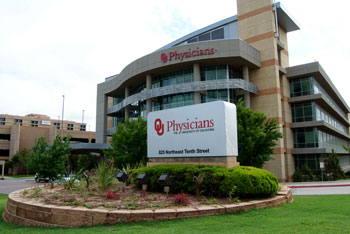
The OU Health Physicians Building in downtown Oklahoma City.

OU Health Physicians is the clinical practice of the University of Oklahoma College of Medicine and the state’s largest physician group. It includes more than 1,300 physicians and advanced practice providers offering care in nearly 150 adult and pediatric specialties and subspecialties. Governed by its own board of directors, OU Health Physicians delivers academic-driven care across Oklahoma and plays a central role in training future healthcare professionals through its integration with the university’s academic and research missions.

== See also ==
- University of Oklahoma College of Medicine
- University of Oklahoma Health Sciences Center
- University of Oklahoma
