= Edmond, Oklahoma =

- City
- Flag Seal Wordmark
- Motto: A Great Place to Grow
- Interactive map of Edmond, Oklahoma
- Location within Oklahoma
- Coordinates: 35.6738°N 97.4131°W
- Country: United States
- State: Oklahoma
- County: Oklahoma
- Founded: April 22, 1889
- Incorporated: May 2, 1890
- Named for: Edmond Schuyler Burdick

Government
  - Type: Council–Manager
  - Mayor: Mark A. Nash
  - Mayor Pro Tem: Barry K. Moore
  - City manager: A.J. Krieger
  - Councilmembers: Maggie Murdock Nichols; Preston Watterson; Phil Fraim

Area
  - City: 87.518 sq mi (226.671 km^{2})
  - Land: 84.413 sq mi (218.629 km^{2})
  - Water: 3.105 sq mi (8.043 km^{2}) 3.55%
- Elevation: 1,122 ft (342 m)

Population (2020)
  - City: 94,428
  - Estimate (2025): 100,479
  - Rank: US: 345th OK: 5th
  - Density: 1,118.6/sq mi (431.91/km^{2})
  - Urban: 982,276 (US: 46th)
  - Metro: 1,512,813 (US: 42nd)
  - Combined: 1,587,915 (US: 39th)
- Time zone: UTC–6 (Central (CST))
  - Summer (DST): UTC–5 (CDT)
- ZIP Codes: 73003, 73012, 73013, 73025, 73034, 73083
- Area codes: 405 and 572
- FIPS code: 40-23200
- GNIS feature ID: 2410402
- Highways: I-35, US 77
- Website: edmondok.gov

Edmond is a city in Oklahoma County, Oklahoma, United States. The population was 94,428 as of the 2020 census, and was estimated at 100,479 in 2025, making it the fifth-most populous city in Oklahoma. It is a part of the Oklahoma City metropolitan area, in Central Oklahoma.

The city borders the northern boundary of Oklahoma City. Public transportation is provided by Citylink Edmond bus service. University of Central Oklahoma and Oklahoma Christian University are located here.

== History ==
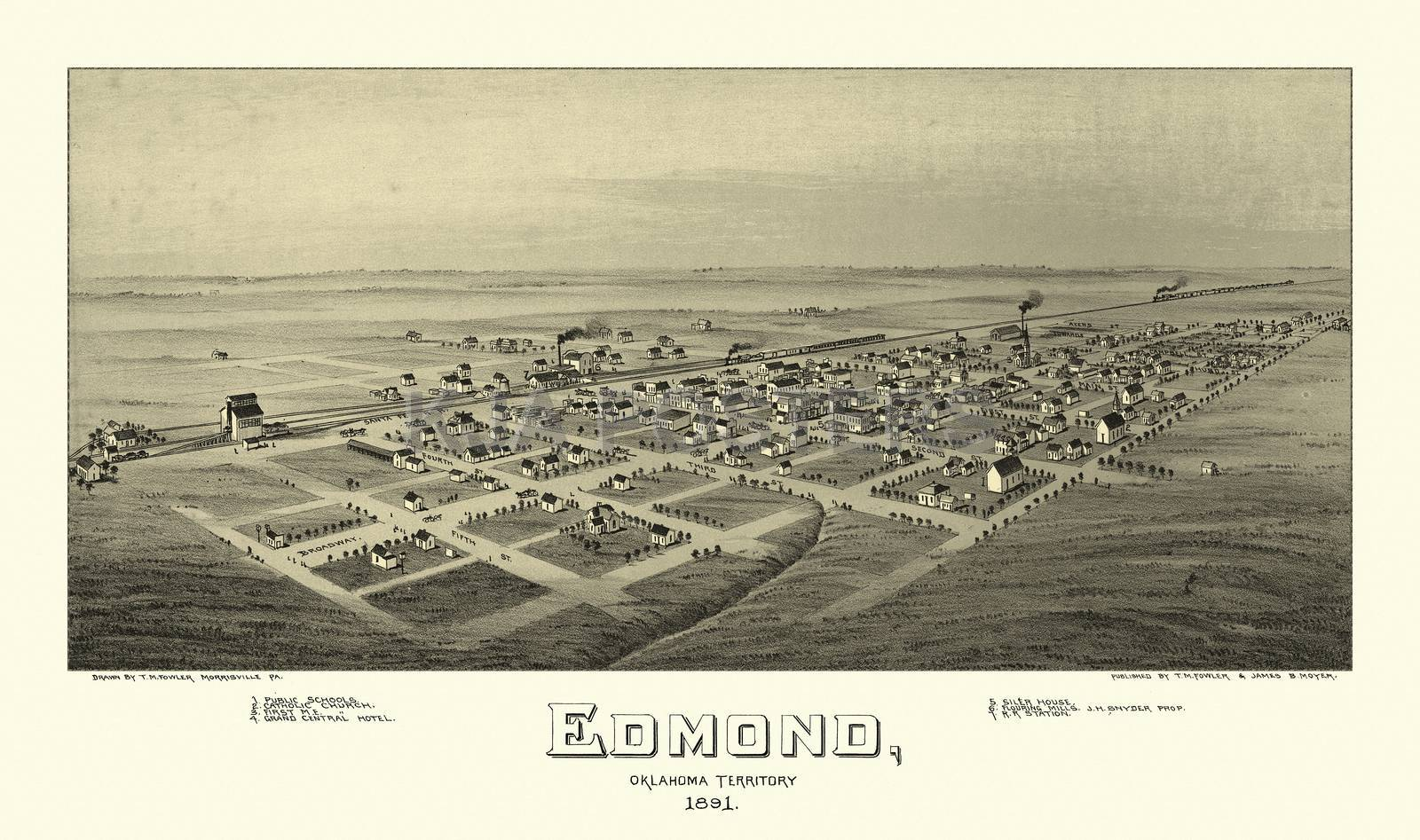
Edmond, Oklahoma Territory, 1891

=== 19th century ===
The Santa Fe rail line in Oklahoma Territory established a water and coaling station for steam engines at this location when the Santa Fe Railroad built into Indian Territory in 1887. The site for the station was chosen because it was the highest point on the line in Oklahoma County; trains could more easily accelerate going downhill while leaving the station in either direction. The railroad then named the station for Edmond Burdick, the Santa Fe's traveling freight agent. When the town was formed after the Oklahoma Land Run of 1889, early settlers decided to adopt the name. Though most of the remnants of the old railroad infrastructure are gone, the Santa Fe, now BNSF, freight line still runs through the same course.

The town of Edmond sprang up overnight during the great Oklahoma land run on April 22, 1889, when homesteads were staked around the Santa Fe station. The original plat for Edmond was prepared by the Seminole Town and Development Company, a newly formed syndicate with ties to the railroad. Many of the original streets were named for men associated with either the Santa Fe Railroad or the town syndicate. The first mayor and city officers were elected in May 1889, and Edmond's population was 294 in the 1890 census.

The first public schoolhouse in Oklahoma Territory, completed in August 1889, is in Edmond. It still stands as a historic monument on 2nd Street between Boulevard and Broadway, and is open to the public on the first two Saturdays of each month or by appointment.

St. John the Baptist Catholic Church, the first church opened after the land run, was located on the southwest corner of East First and South Boulevard. The congregation still exists, although not in its original building or location.

In 1889, the Gower Cemetery was established by John and Ophelia Gower, a formerly enslaved couple. Intended as a free burial ground for African American and indigent families, it is the only surviving evidence of an early Black homesteading community in Edmond and was listed on the National Register of Historic Places in 2000.

In December 1890, the territorial legislature established three universities, the state university in Norman, the agricultural and mechanical college in Stillwater, and a "normal" or teaching school in Edmond.

The first classes for the Territorial Normal School (University of Central Oklahoma) were held November 9, 1891, in the Methodist Church on the southwest corner of North Broadway and West Hurd. Old North, the Territorial Normal School's iconic first building, was opened for classes on January 2, 1893, and ahead of Oklahoma State University's Central Hall or Oklahoma University's Science Hall.

The Edmond Sun, established by Milton W. "Kicking Bird" Reynolds on July 18, 1889, was the state's oldest continuous newspaper dating from Oklahoma Territorial days.

=== 20th century ===
Old seal used from 1965 until 1996 with cross in right quadrant

In the early 20th century, Edmond was known as a sundown town. Racial covenants barred property sales to individuals of races other than White people or Native Americans in every neighborhood built between 1911 and 1949, except the Edmond Highway Addition in 1924. Racial housing covenants in the United States became unenforceable in 1948 after the Shelley v. Kraemer decision by the United States Supreme Court.

In 1925, a new city charter was written for the city, including a still-enforced requirement that all candidates for mayor or city council be freeholders, or landowners within the city.

Edmond was the site of a workplace shooting on August 20, 1986, in which 14 people were killed and six wounded by Patrick Sherrill, a postman who then committed suicide. This event was the deadliest killing in a string of U.S. postal employee murder–suicides that inspired the slang term "going postal". A memorial to the victims of the attack stands outside the U.S. Post Office in downtown Edmond.

The city was the subject of a Tenth Circuit Court of Appeals case challenging the depiction of a Christian cross on the city seal, raising issues concerning the Establishment Clause of the U.S. Constitution. In May 1996, the Supreme Court let stand a Federal Appeals Court ruling ordering the city to remove the cross from the seal. Rather than replace the cross, the city council voted to leave the spot blank so as to "remind people of what was there," as well as this being the least expensive way to comply.

=== 21st century ===
Edmond water tower, pictured in 2007

A memorial service for famed Oklahoman baseball player Bobby Murcer was held in Edmond on August 6, 2008, at the Memorial Road Church of Christ. Among the some 2,000 attending the memorial were Reggie Jackson, Derek Jeter, Andy Pettitte, and former Yankees manager Joe Girardi.

In 2011, Darrell Davis was elected as the first Black city councilor in Edmond's history, and in 2021, he was elected the first Black mayor of Edmond.

== Geography ==
Edmond is just north of Oklahoma City in Oklahoma County, Oklahoma. According to the United States Census Bureau, the city has an area of 87.518 square miles (226.67 km^{2}), of which 84.413 square miles (218.63 km^{2}) is land and 3.105 square miles (8.04 km^{2}) (3.55%) is water. Arcadia Lake, a fishing spot for the Oklahoma City metropolitan area on Edmond's east side, contains bluegill, channel catfish, blue catfish, and largemouth bass. Twin Bridges Lake is also in Edmond.

Edmond lies in Central Oklahoma's Sandstone Hills region, known for hills, blackjack oak, and post oak.

The city is in an ecological region known as the Cross Timbers.

=== Climate ===
Edmond has a humid subtropical climate with frequent variations in weather during part of the year and consistently hot summers. Prolonged and severe droughts often lead to wildfires, and heavy rainfall often leads to flash flooding and flooding. Consistent winds, usually from the south or south-southeast during the summer, help temper the hotter weather. Consistent northerly winds during the winter can intensify cold periods. Severe ice storms and snowstorms happen sporadically during the winter.

The city is subject to frequent and severe tornadoes and hailstorms and is in Tornado Alley. The Oklahoma City metropolitan area is one of the world's most tornado-prone areas.

== Demographics ==
Historical population
Census	Pop.	Note	%±
1890	294		—
1900	965		228.2%
1910	2,090		116.6%
1920	2,452		17.3%
1930	3,576		45.8%
1940	4,002		11.9%
1950	6,086		52.1%
1960	8,577		40.9%
1970	16,633		93.9%
1980	34,637		108.2%
1990	52,315		51.0%
2000	68,315		30.6%
2010	81,405		19.2%
2020	94,428		16.0%
2025 (est.)	100,479		6.4%
U.S. Decennial Census; 2020 Census

According to realtor website Zillow, the average price of a home as of September 30, 2026, in Edmond was $354,038.

As of the 2025 American Community Survey, there were 39,348 estimated households in Edmond with an average of 2.50 persons per household. The city has a median household income of $111,502. Approximately 6.2% of the city's population lives at or below the poverty line. Edmond has an estimated 64.4% employment rate, with 60.3% of the population holding a bachelor's degree or higher and 98.1% holding a high school diploma. There were 41,245 housing units at an average density of 188.65 per square mile (72.84/km^{2}).

The median age in the city was 36.9 years.

Edmond, Oklahoma – racial and ethnic composition Note: the US Census treats Hispanic/Latino as an ethnic category. This table excludes Latinos from the racial categories and assigns them to a separate category. Hispanics/Latinos may be of any race.
Race / ethnicity (NH = non-Hispanic)	Pop. 1990	Pop. 2000	Pop. 2010	Pop. 2020	% 1990	% 2000	% 2010	% 2020
White alone (NH)	47,449	58,104	65,076	67,978	90.70%	85.05%	79.94%	71.99%
Black or African American alone (NH)	1,594	2,721	4,412	6,033	3.05%	3.98%	5.42%	6.39%
Native American or Alaska Native alone (NH)	1,283	1,535	2,040	2,069	2.45%	2.25%	2.51%	2.19%
Asian alone (NH)	1,049	2,215	2,599	3,354	2.01%	3.24%	3.19%	3.55%
Pacific Islander alone (NH)	—	46	100	129	—	0.07%	0.12%	0.14%
Other race alone (NH)	19	44	101	297	0.04%	0.06%	0.12%	0.31%
Mixed race or multiracial (NH)	—	1,769	2,933	7,945	—	2.59%	3.60%	8.41%
Hispanic or Latino (any race)	921	1,881	4,144	6,623	1.76%	2.75%	5.09%	7.01%
Total	52,315	68,315	81,405	94,428	100.00%	100.00%	100.00%	100.00%

=== 2020 census ===
As of the 2020 census, there were 94,428 people, 36,398 households, and 25,395 families residing in the city. The population density was 431.91 inhabitants per square mile (166.76/km^{2}). There were 38,705 housing units at an average density of 177.04 per square mile (68.36/km^{2}). The racial makeup of the city was 73.96% White, 6.57% African American, 2.44% Native American, 3.57% Asian, 0.15% Pacific Islander, 2.25% from some other races and 11.06% from two or more races. Hispanic or Latino people of any race were 7.01% of the population.

=== 2010 census ===
As of the 2010 census, there were 81,405 people, 31,475 households, and 21,782 families residing in the city. The population density was 371.10 inhabitants per square mile (143.28/km^{2}). There were 33,178 housing units at an average density of 151.25 per square mile (58.40/km^{2}). The racial makeup of the city was 82.60% White, 5.53% African American, 2.62% Native American, 3.22% Asian, 0.13% Pacific Islander, 1.76% from some other races and 4.15% from two or more races. Hispanic or Latino people of any race were 5.09% of the population.

=== 2000 census ===
As of the 2000 census, there were 68,315 people, 25,256 households, and 18,588 families residing in the city. The population density was 309.81 inhabitants per square mile (119.62/km^{2}). There were 26,380 housing units at an average density of 119.64 per square mile (46.19/km^{2}). The racial makeup of the city was 86.58% White, 4.04% African American, 2.27% Native American, 3.26% Asian, 0.08% Pacific Islander, 0.90% from some other races and 2.87% from two or more races. Hispanic or Latino people of any race were 2.75% of the population.

There were 25,256 households, of which 39.3% had children under the age of 18 living with them, 61.9% were married couples living together, 9.1% had a female householder with no husband present, and 26.4% were non-families. 20.6% of all households were made up of individuals and 6.1% had someone living alone who was 65 years of age or older. The average household size was 2.63 and the average family size was 3.08.

In the city the population was spread out, with 27.5% under the age of 18, 11.3% from 18 to 24, 29.6% from 25 to 44, 22.8% from 45 to 64, and 8.8% who were 65 years of age or older. The median age was 34 years. For every 100 females, there were 93.7 males. For every 100 females age 18 and over, there were 89.5 males.

The median income for a household in the city was $54,556, and the median income for a family was $65,230. Males had a median income of $46,833 versus $28,231 for females. The per capita income for the city was $26,517. About 4.4% of families and 7.2% of the population were below the poverty line, including 6.2% of those under age 18 and 5.3% of those age 65 or over.

== Economy ==
The University of Central Oklahoma is a major employer. Some of Edmond's targeted industries include wholesale trade, light manufacturing, information technology, and professional, scientific, and technical services. Supermarket chain Crest Foods is based in Edmond.

=== Top employers ===
According to the city's 2025 Annual Comprehensive Financial Report, the largest employers in the city are:

#	Employer	Product/Business	# of Employees	Percentage of Total
1	Edmond Public Schools	Public Education	3,200	39.1%
2	University of Central Oklahoma	Higher Education	1,372	16.8%
3	City of Edmond	Local Municipality	814	9.9%
4	Integris Health Edmond	Hospital	580	7.1%
5	Mercy Edmond	Clinics and Wellness Center	578	7.1%
6	OU Health Edmond Medical Center	Hospital	436	5.3%
7	Petra Industries	Electronic Distribution	367	4.5%
8	Crest Foods	Grocery Store Chain	300	3.7%
9	Oklahoma Christian University	Private Christian University	289	3.5%
10	Summit Medical Center	Surgical Treatment Center	252	3.1%
Total			8,188	100.00%

== Arts and culture ==
The city of Edmond is making efforts to promote public art with murals, stained glass, and steel sculptures. On a portion of Main Street, statuary lines nearly every corner. On July 4, 2007, the city inaugurated a bronze statue of Nannita R.H. Daisey, believed to be the first woman laying claim on Oklahoma land in the first (1889) land run. In 2015 the Dave McGary sculpture of Chief Touch the Clouds was relocated to Edmond from Houston's Astrodome. The 18-foot-tall, 15-foot-wide sculpture is located on Second Street at the entrance of the University of Central Oklahoma.

Edmond residents have access to 57 Protestant and three Catholic congregations, six Latter-day Saint congregations, one Unitarian Universalist church, one Islamic mosque, and one Haziratu'l-Quds for followers of the Baháʼí Faith.

A 163-foot-tall cross sits at the Edmond Campus of Life.Church on the corner of State Highway 66 (also called Second Street) and the I-35 Service Road. The church, known at the time as MetroChurch, fought the city of Edmond to erect the cross, which the planning commission ostensibly did not want to allow because they considered it a billboard.

The movies Rudderless (2014), American Underdog (2021), and Reagan (2024) were partially shot in Edmond.

== Sports ==
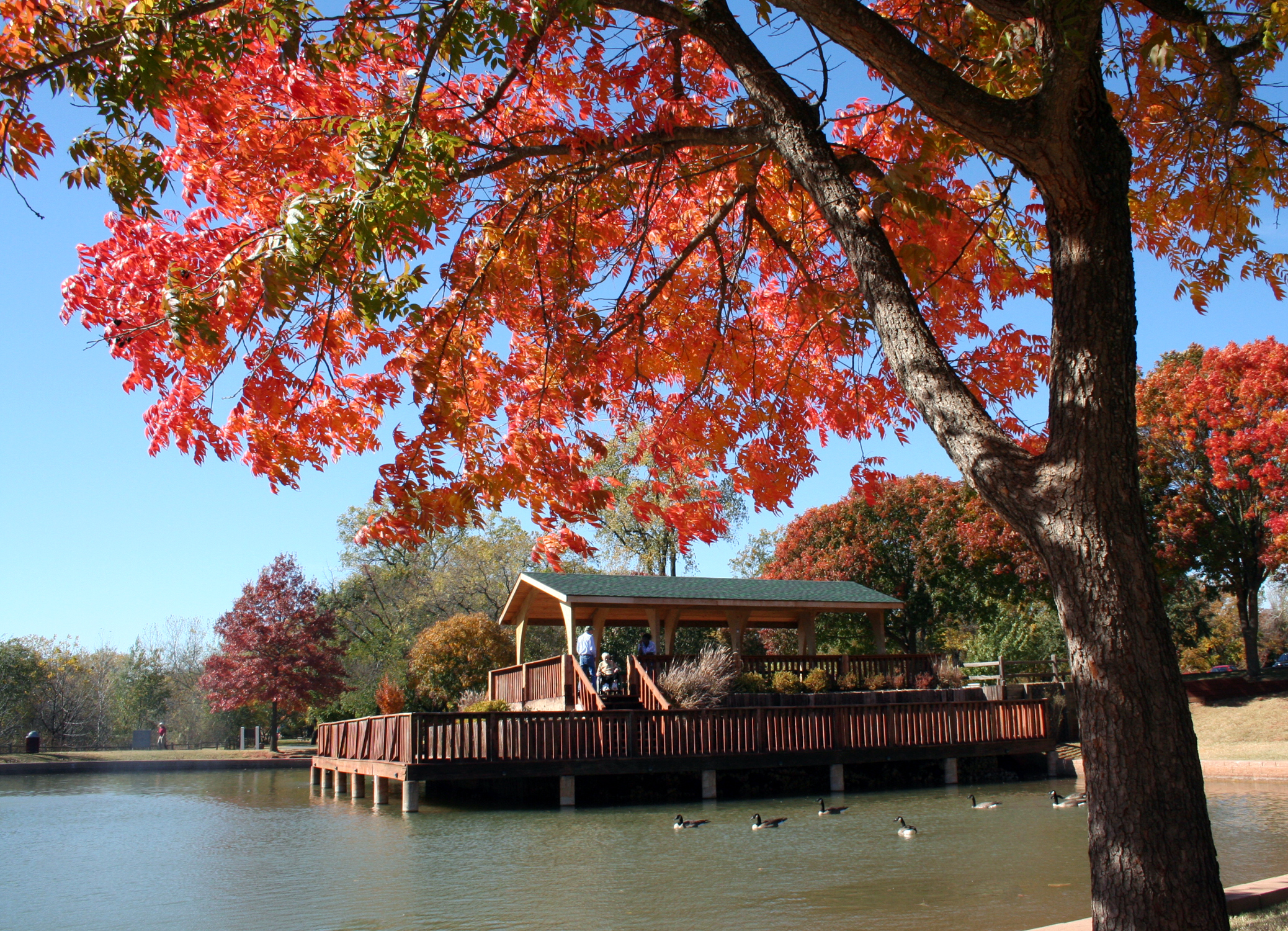
Hafer Park Pond

Rugby union is a developing sport in Edmond and the Oklahoma City metropolitan area. Edmond boasts two rugby clubs -the Edmond Rugby Club (The Storm) and the University of Central Oklahoma Rugby Football Club.

Oak Tree National golf club is located here.

== Education ==
Most of Edmond is in the Edmond Public Schools district. Portions are in other school districts: Deer Creek Public Schools, Jones Public Schools, and Luther Public Schools.

=== Elementary schools ===
- Angie Debo Elementary School (outside of Edmond)
- Centennial Elementary School
- Charles Haskell Elementary School (outside of Edmond)
- Chisholm Elementary School
- Clegern Elementary School
- Clyde Howell (the district's early-childhood education center)
- Cross Timbers Elementary School
- Frontier Elementary School
- Heritage Elementary School
- Ida Freeman Elementary School
- John Ross Elementary School
- Northern Hills Elementary School
- Orvis Risner Elementary School
- Post Oak Elementary School
- Russell Dougherty Elementary School
- Sunset Elementary School
- Washington Irving Elementary School
- West Field Elementary School
- Will Rogers Elementary School
- Redbud Elementary
- Scissortail Elementary (outside of Edmond)

=== Middle schools ===
- Central Middle School
- Cheyenne Middle School
- Cimarron Middle School
- Heartland Middle School
- Oakdale Middle School
- Sequoyah Middle School
- Summit Middle School (outside of Edmond)

=== High schools ===
- Edmond Memorial High School
- Edmond North High School
- Edmond Santa Fe High School
- Boulevard Academy

=== Colleges and universities ===
- Herbert W. Armstrong College
- University of Central Oklahoma

=== Private schools ===
- Holy Trinity Lutheran School
- Mercy School Institute
- Oklahoma Christian School
- Oklahoma Christian Academy
- The Academy of Classical Christian Studies
- St. Elizabeth Ann Seton Catholic School
- St. Mary's Episcopal School

== Notable people ==
- Avie Acosta, fashion model, lived in Edmond.
- Dusty Allen, Major League Baseball player (San Diego Padres and Detroit Tigers), graduated from Edmond Memorial High School.
- Brian Anderson, born in Edmond in 1993, was an MLB third baseman for the Milwaukee Brewers.
- Jim Beaver, actor (star of Deadwood and Supernatural), lived in Edmond 1971–1976.
- Paul Blair, National Football League (NFL) offensive tackle drafted by the Chicago Bears in 1986, graduated from Edmond Memorial High School.
- Allison Brown, Miss Oklahoma Teen USA 1986, Miss Teen USA 1986, grew up in Edmond.
- Joel Comm, a New York Times best-selling author, lived in Edmond from 1998 to 2007.
- Greyson Chance, an Internet celebrity and recording artist, lives in Edmond.
- Bright Dike, professional soccer player
- Courtney Dike, soccer player
- Daryl Dike, professional soccer player
- Kristian Doolittle (born 1997), a former basketball player for Hapoel Eilat of the Israeli Basketball Premier League, graduated from Edmond Memorial HS.
- Robert Galbreath, Jr. (1863–1953), lived a short time in Edmond, where he served as deputy U.S. marshal and as Edmond's postmaster.
- KC Green, a comic artist, graduated from the University of Central Oklahoma.
- Kelly Gregg, a retired Kansas City Chiefs and Super Bowl-winning Baltimore Ravens' nose guard, is from Edmond.
- Blake Griffin, a forward for the National Basketball Association, graduated from Edmond's Oklahoma Christian School.
- Charlie Haas, a professional wrestler, was born in Edmond in 1972. He is a former three-time WWE tag team champion.
- Johny Hendricks, a UFC welterweight champion, graduated from Edmond Memorial High School in 2002.
- Mat Hoffman, a BMX rider, graduated from Edmond Memorial HS in 1990.
- Hoda Katebi, an Iranian-American writer and activist, graduated from Edmond Santa Fe High School in 2012.
- Trey Kennedy, Internet comedian and musician, graduated from Edmond Memorial HS.
- Mike Kennerty of the pop rock groups the All-American Rejects and Mikaila lives in Edmond.
- Darci Lynne, a ventriloquist and the winner of season 12 of America's Got Talent, grew up in Edmond.
- Brady Manek, a former college basketball player and professional player in Turkey, was born in Edmond.
- Shannon Miller (b. 1977), an Olympic gold medalist in gymnastics (1996), attended Edmond North High School.
- Daniel Nayeri, author, lived in Edmond.
- Garrett Richards, MLB player for the Los Angeles Angels, grew up in Edmond and graduated from Edmond Memorial High School in 2006.
- Josh Richardson, a former Miami Heat basketball player, attended Santa Fe HS.
- Bob Ricks, a former Edmond chief of police and former FBI agent, was involved in the controversial 1993 Waco Siege.
- Mookie Salaam, a professional sprinter for Team USA, attended Edmond North HS.
- Bill Self, head men's basketball coach at the University of Kansas, was inducted into the Naismith Memorial Basketball Hall of Fame in 2017. He attended Edmond Memorial HS.
- Mark Snyder (1946–2020), a former Oklahoma state senator and businessman, was born and raised in the city.
- Laura Spencer, an actress, grew up in Edmond.
- William C. Wantland, bishop of the Episcopal Diocese of Eau Claire, was born in Edmond.
- Brandon Weeden graduated from Edmond Santa Fe, and played NFL football for several teams.
- Steve Zabel, an NFL linebacker and tight end drafted by the Philadelphia Eagles in 1970, resides in Edmond.

== See also ==
- List of sundown towns in the United States
