= Crest Foods =

Grocery store chain

Crest Discount Foods
- Type: Private
- Industry: Retail
- Founded: 1946; 80 years ago Midwest City, Oklahoma, U.S.
- Founder: Nick and Cherry Harroz
- Headquarters: Edmond, Oklahoma, U.S.
- Number of locations: 10
- Area served: United States
- Key people: Bruce Harroz
- Products: Grocery
- Website: www.crestfoodsok.com

Crest Foods is a family owned and operated business chain of grocery stores in Oklahoma, with the corporate office in Edmond. As of 2026, there are ten stores. It buys direct from 150 manufacturers and the largest supplier in the state.

== History ==
The company opened in 1946 as Nick's Brett Drive Grocery in Midwest City and grew throughout the 1950s and the 1960s. In 1964, the business moved to a new location in the Ridgecrest shopping center on Reno Avenue in Midwest City. They opened the first Crest Food stores in Midwest City.

In 1984, their second location opened in Midwest City. In 1997, their third location opened in Edmond, where the corporate offices are located. The name was shortened to Crest. In 1999, Nick and Cherry Harroz retired and passed on their company to their son Bruce Harroz.

In 2002, a fourth store was added in Moore. In 2004, a fifth store was added in Oklahoma City, and the following year, a sixth store opened in northern Oklahoma City. In 2010, a seventh store opened, the first to be named Crest Fresh Market, in southern Oklahoma City.

In 2013, an eighth location opened in Norman. In August 2014, the company acquired a 220,000 square foot distribution center.

On January 23, 2017, it was announced that a ninth location would be added to the chain. The 106,565 square foot store was originally targeted to open in early 2018. On April 20, 2018, the company announced that the Edmond store would be delayed by several years.

In October 2020 a location was opened in Yukon.

== Locations ==
It has stores in:

- Midwest City, Oklahoma (2)
- Edmond, Oklahoma (2)
- Moore, Oklahoma (1)
- Oklahoma City, Oklahoma (3)
- Norman, Oklahoma (1)
- Yukon, Oklahoma (1)
- Mustang, Oklahoma (TBD)
