= Integris Health Edmond =

Integris Health Edmond Hospital
- Integris Health

Geography
- Location: 4801 INTEGRIS Parkway, Edmond, Oklahoma, United States
- Coordinates: 35°38′39.66″N 97°25′6.1248″W

Organization
- Type: General
- Network: INTEGRIS Health

Services
- Standards: Joint Commission
- Emergency department: Level III Trauma, Level I Cardiac
- Beds: 104

Helipads
- Helipad: Yes

History
- Founded: 2011

Links
- Website: http://integrisok.com/integris-health-edmond-ok
- Lists: Hospitals in Oklahoma

Integris Health Edmond Hospital is a not-for-profit hospital located in Edmond, Oklahoma, and accredited through the Joint Commission. Opened on October 3, 2011, the hospital offers medical, surgical, and rehabilitation services to Oklahoma, Logan, and Lincoln counties.

== Medical services ==
Integris Health Edmond Hospital's campus consists of a full service hospital with 104 inpatient beds and two medical office buildings. Facilities include a Level III emergency department and an intensive care unit.

=== Outpatient rehabilitation ===
Jim Thorpe Rehabilitation offers a variety of services including physical therapy, occupational therapy, and speech and language pathology.

== Awards and recognition ==
- 2012
  - Certified Health Oklahoma, Excellent Business Award
- 2013
  - Quality Respiratory Care Recognition presented by American Association for Respiratory Care. This award identifies facilities that use qualified respiratory therapist while maintaining the guidelines set forth by the governing agency.
  - Voluntary Hospitals of America (VHA) Regional High Performance Award for Emergency Department in Length of Stay and Left Without Being Seen Rate
  - VHA Regional Patient Safety Award for Clinical Excellence in Prevention of Complications, catheter associated blood stream infections
  - Press Ganey Guardian of Excellence Award for Physician Partnership. Press Ganey is an organization whose mission is to allow patients to have a voice in how they are treated within a healthcare system.
  - Press Ganey Guardian of Excellence Award for Patient Satisfaction, Ambulatory Surgery
