= Hoda Katebi =

Iranian-American writer and activist

- Born: January 27, 1995 (age 31); Oklahoma City, Oklahoma, U.S.
- Education: University of Chicago
- Occupations: Writer; activist

Hoda Katebi (Persian: هدی کاتبی) is an American writer and activist whose work focuses on garment workers' rights, labor in fashion supply chains, Muslim identity, politics and clothing in Iran, and fighting surveillance programs and militarism. She is the founder of Blue Tin Production, the first apparel manufacturing worker co-operative in the United States entirely run by working-class women of color.

== Early life ==
Katebi was born and raised in Oklahoma by her Iranian immigrant parents. She has discussed the challenges she faced wearing a hijab to her Oklahoma school when classmates would assault her and try to take off her scarf.

In 2016, she graduated from the University of Chicago with a degree in Near Eastern Languages and Civilizations.

== Politics and writing ==
Katebi began her writing career in 2013 by publishing essays and fashion critiques on her own platform called JooJoo Azad, meaning "free bird" in Persian. Katebi's early writing discussed Muslim identity, politics and fashion, garment workers, fashion in Iran, and racial politics in the United States. Katebi maintained a "Boycott List" of fashion companies engaged in human rights violations.

Katebi is the author of a photography book entitled Tehran Streetstyle (2016). She has published essays in Vogue.com, Washington Post, Columbia Journalism Review and others. Katebi is a contributing author to I Refuse to Condemn: Resisting racism in times of national security, published in 2020 by Manchester University Press.

In October 2016, Katebi was arrested for protesting the annual Illinois Tactical Officers Association Conference and Weapons Expo. She has been a vocal activist against police militarization and surveillance programs such as Countering Violent Extremism (CVE) and has conducted trainings on the war on terror and anti-Muslim racism around the world. Katebi identifies as an abolitionist.

In February 2018, Katebi was interviewed on WGN about her book, Tehran Streetstyle, and fashion in Iran. When the discussion turned to the question of America's military presence in the Middle East and Iran's supposed nuclear weapons, the interviewer suggested that Katebi's criticism of American imperialism did not "sound like an American." Katebi defended herself by saying "that's because I've read."

== Global book club #BecauseWeveRead ==
Since its creation after the WGN interview, Katebi's radical book club #BecauseWeveRead has launched chapters around the world that host discussion sessions and mobilize communities in various social justice efforts. Katebi says the book club is working toward "doing what our institutions have systematically failed to do: educate us on reality." Topics covered through the readings include anti-Blackness, Orientalism, and capitalism, among other issues. #BecauseWeveRead also has launched 'Emergency Reads' on urgent, unfolding issues such as the Sudanese revolution in January 2019 or the Indian communications blackout and military escalation on Kashmir in October 2019. #Global book club #BecauseWeveRead chapters have organized community events, prison book drives, poetry slams, protests, and other events on topics related to readings. Katebi works with publishers to provide free ebooks of each reading, and ends each unit with a global conversation on YouTube Live with different guests. Past guests have included Naomi Klein and Arundhati Roy.

Katebi's #BecauseWeveRead has been featured in media outlets including Dazed Magazine and Refinery29.

== Clothing co-operative and garment labor activism ==
=== Blue Tin Production ===
Katebi supports ethical fashion and advocates for the abolition of fast fashion. She argues that fast fashion subjects garment workers to "systemic gender-based violence" including sexual and verbal abuse by their employers as well as dangerous working conditions in sweatshops.

In early 2019, Katebi launched a clothing co-operative, Blue Tin Production, which is run by refugee and immigrant women and promotes ethical garment production and is the first of its kind in the United States. In an interview with Vogue, Katebi stated "her overall goal is to offer designers in the U.S.—and abroad—a no-brainer alternative to sweatshops with "radical transparent production."

In December 2019 Blue Tin Production published its first annual report.

Katebi's activism and Blue Tin Production has garnered attention from international fashion and journalism outlets, including Vogue, The Chicago Tribune, The New York Times, The Guardian, and Medium.

=== 'Revolution-Washing' ===
In 2017 Katebi coined the term 'Revolution Washing' which has since been used to describe the ways in which fast-fashion brands attempt to brand themselves as progressive to appeal to conscious consumers while using sweatshop labor.

In August 2019 Katebi went on a delegation to Indonesia to meet with garment workers working in Nike, H&M, GAP, and other fast-fashion sweatshops.

=== Acknowledgements and awards ===
- The Pioneer Award given by the Chicago Foundation for Women
- 20 In Their 20s by Crain's magazine
- Leaders for a New Chicago given by the Field Foundation
- 40 under 40 honored by the National Iranian-American Council
