= Union Mission Site =

- U.S. National Register of Historic Places
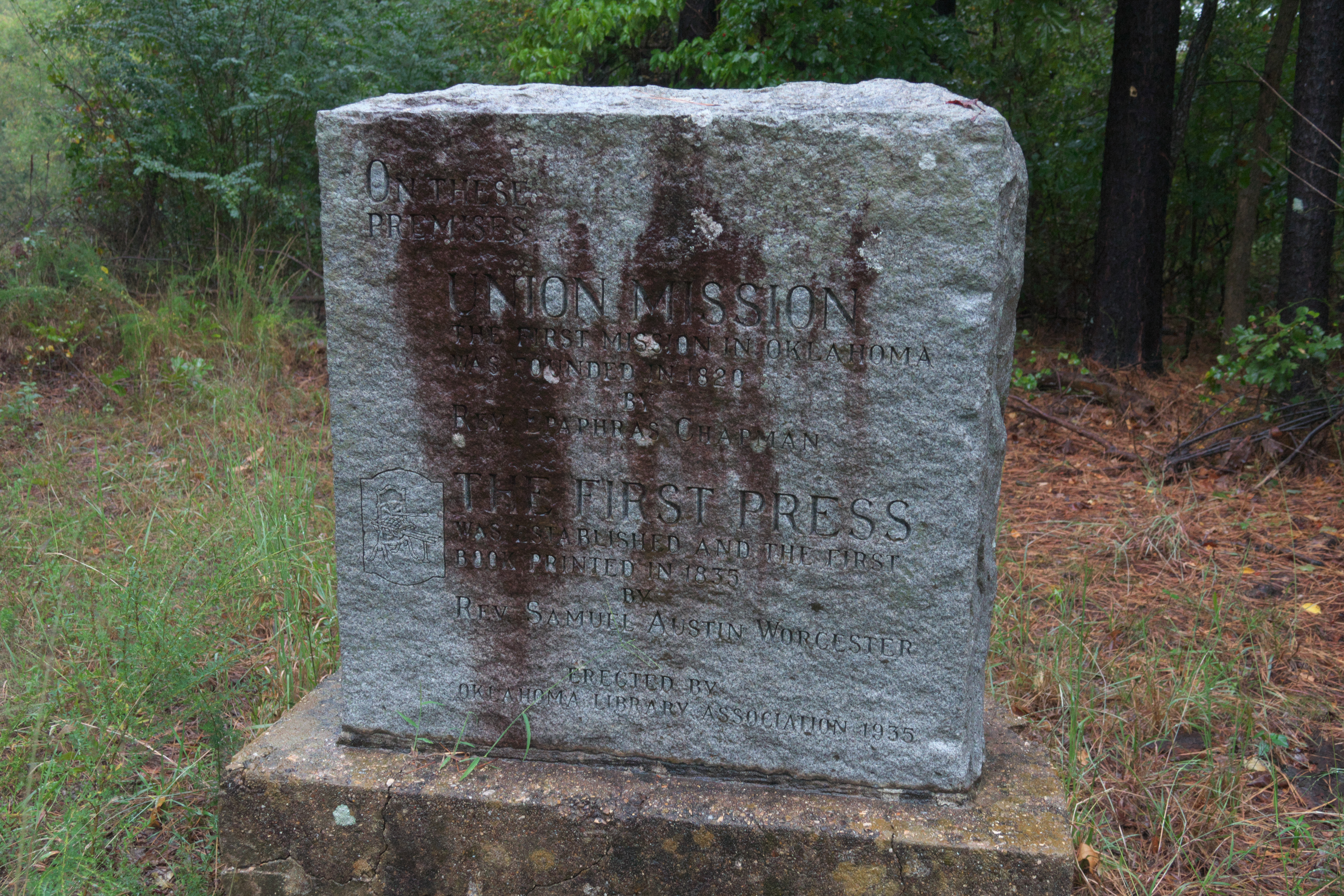
- Union Mission Monument

- Location within Oklahoma Location within the United States
- Nearest city: Mazie, Oklahoma
- Coordinates: 36°7′34″N 95°17′9″W
- Area: 0.5 acres (0.20 ha)
- NRHP reference No.: 71000668
- Added to NRHP: September 10, 1971

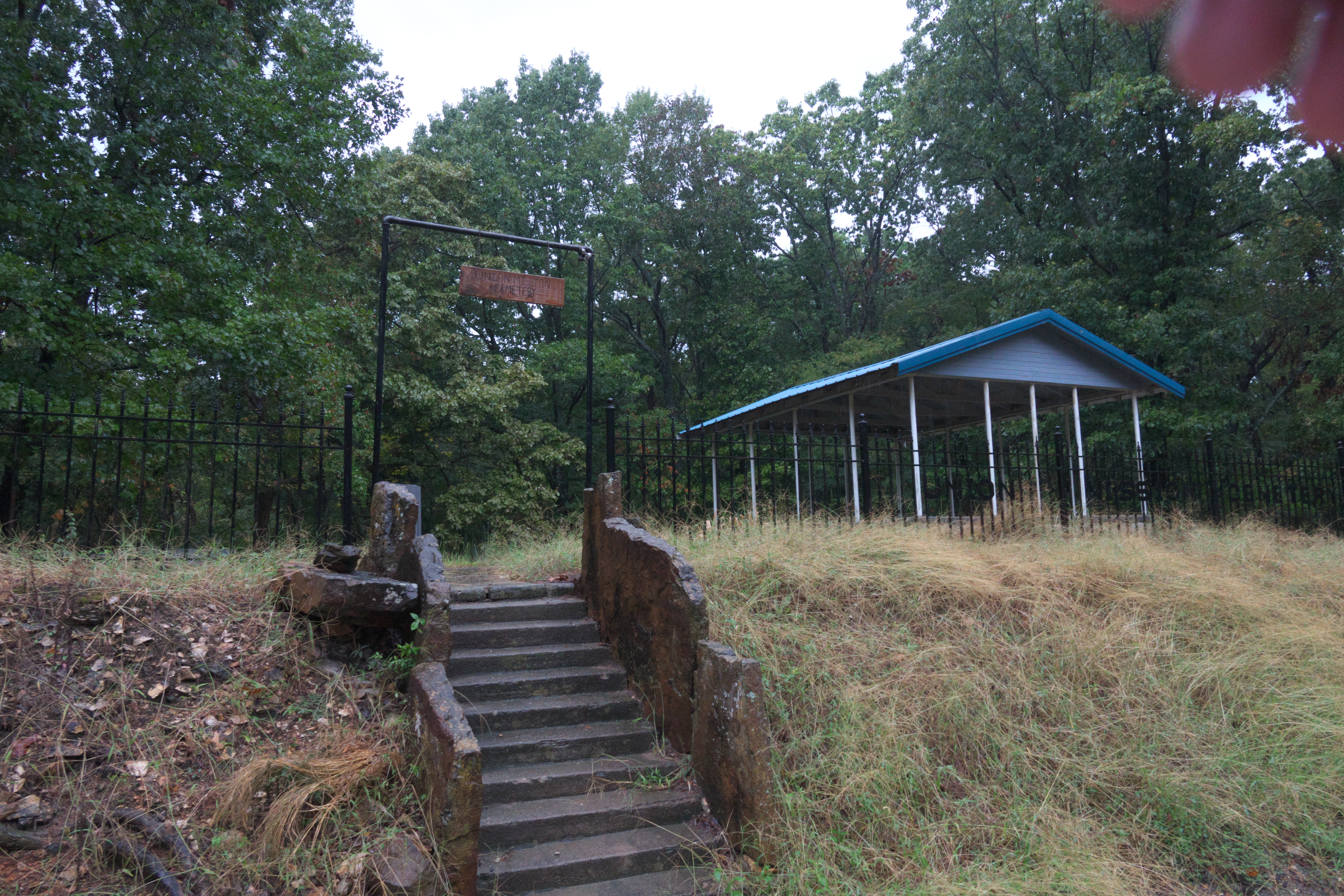
Union Mission Cemetery

Union Mission Site is a historic site of a church mission and school about 5 miles (8.0 km) northeast of Mazie, Oklahoma.

The Union mission was started in 1820, and its school operated from 1821 to 1825. The school instructed 144 Indian children: 71 Osages, 54 Creeks, and 29 Cherokees; a total of 91 boys and 63 girls.

Union Mission was the first Protestant mission established in Indian Territory (present-day Oklahoma). It was also the site of the first school in Indian Territory and the first printing press in Indian Territory, and the first book printed in future Oklahoma.

There are a few graves at the site, including the 1825 monument for Rev. Epaphras Chapman, which, per the NRHP nomination, is the oldest known monument in Oklahoma.

The site was added to the National Register of Historic Places in 1971.
