= Integris Bass Baptist Health Center =

INTEGRIS Health Enid Hospital

Geography
- Location: Enid, Oklahoma, Northwest Oklahoma, Oklahoma, United States
- Coordinates: 36°23′23″N 97°53′16″W

Services
- Beds: 207

History
- Opened: 1910

Links
- Lists: Hospitals in Oklahoma

INTEGRIS Health Enid Hospital is the oldest hospital in Enid, Oklahoma, and consists of three main facilities. Its main facility has been located at 600 S. Monroe Street since 1914. In 1996, the hospital acquired Enid Regional Hospital (401 S. Third Street), creating its Long Term Acute Care Hospital, and in 1997, acquired its Meadowlake facility (2216 S. Van Buren Street), INTEGRIS Bass Behavioral Health.

Founded on October 5, 1910 by Dr. Fredrick Auld Hudson, and incorporated in 1914 as Enid General Hospital and Training School for Nurses. The hospital became affiliated with the Baptist General Convention in 1953. Following a donation that allowed for major renovations and expansion, the hospital was renamed in 1968 for Harry W. Bass, Jr., president of H.W. Bass & Sons, Inc. and the Harry Bass Drilling Company. Bass' father, Harry W. Bass, Sr. was born in Enid in 1895. INTEGRIS Health Corporation purchased the hospital in 1994.
