= Integris Southwest Medical Center =

- Integris Health
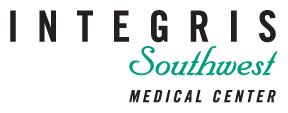

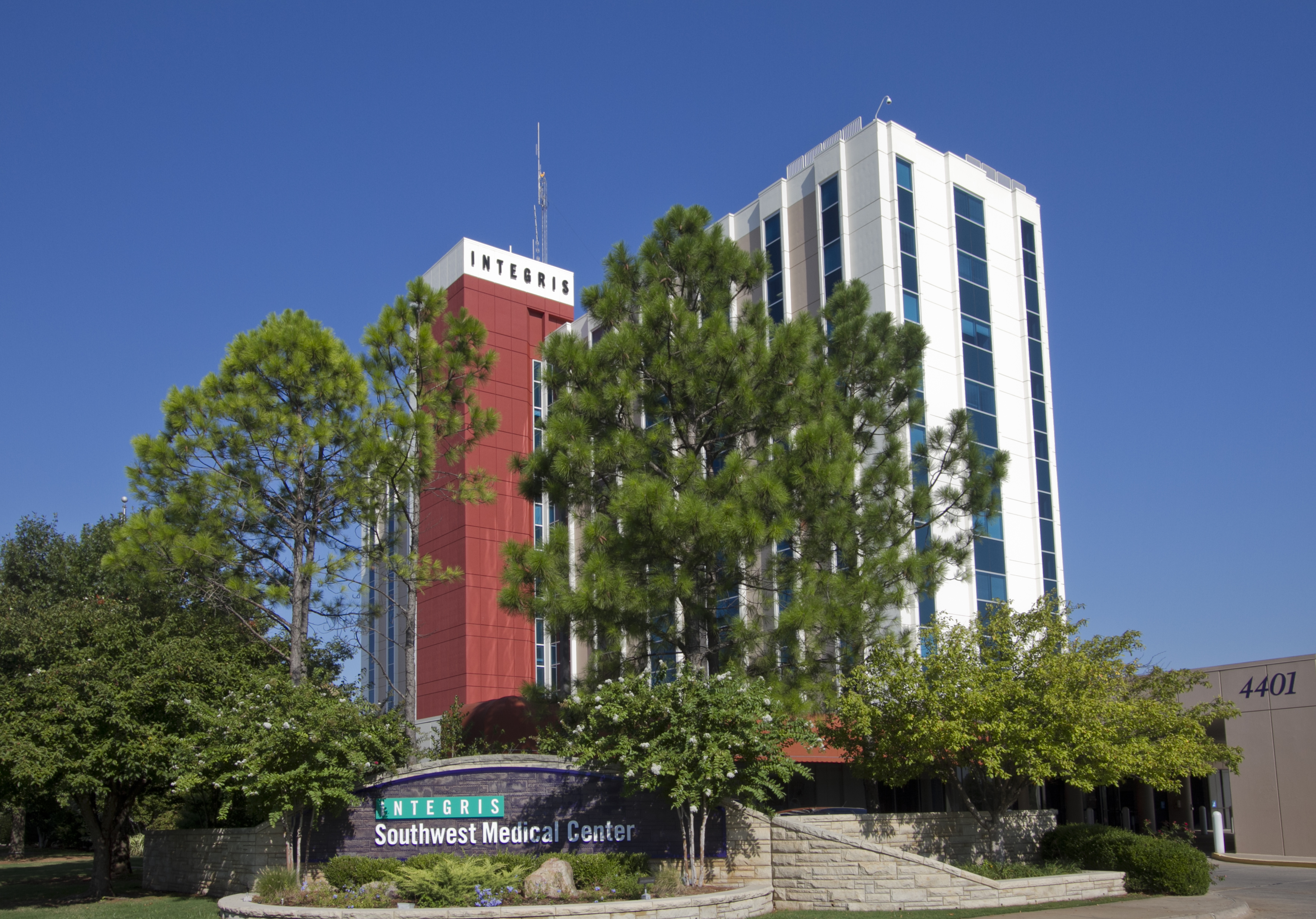
- Integris Southwest Medical Center

Geography
- Location: 4401 S. Western Ave., Oklahoma City, OK 73109, Oklahoma City, Oklahoma, Oklahoma, United States
- Coordinates: 35.422035°N 97.532181°W

Organization
- Type: General

Services
- Standards: Joint Commission
- Emergency department: Level II trauma center
- Beds: 406

Helipads
- Helipad: FAA LID: 50OK

History
- Former names: South Community Hospital (1965-1992), Southwest Medical Center of Oklahoma (1992-1995)
- Founded: 1965

Links
- Website: http://Integrisok.com
- Lists: Hospitals in Oklahoma

Integris Health Southwest Medical Center is a comprehensive hospital located in southwest Oklahoma City, Oklahoma.

This is a multi functional hospital. Units of the hospital include Integris Cancer Institute of Oklahoma, the Integris Southwest Breast Health and Imaging Center, Integris Jim Thorpe Rehabilitation, the Integris Neuromuscular Center, the Integris M.J. and S. Elizabeth Schwartz Sleep Disorders Center and the Integris James R. Daniel Stroke Center.

== Medical services ==
- Breast Health and Imaging Center
- Cancer Institute
- Cardiology Southwest
- Heart Care Center
- Hospitalist Program
- Integris Southwest Heart Care Center
- James R. Daniel Stroke Center of Oklahoma
- Jim Thorpe Rehabilitation
- Neuromuscular Center
- M.J. and S. Elizabeth Schwartz Sleep Disorders Center of Oklahoma
- Neuroscience Institute
- Pastoral Care
- Pharmacy
- Pulmonary Medicine
- Radiology Services
- Surgery Department
- Volunteer Services
- Women's and Children's Services

== History ==
Integris Southwest Medical Center opened in 1965 as South Community Hospital. The name was changed to Southwest Medical Center of Oklahoma in March 1992 and then became Integris Southwest Medical Center in February 1995.

Integris Southwest Medical Center has grown from a 73-bed community hospital to a medical center with more than 400 beds.

== Hospital rating data ==
The Health Grades website contains the clinical quality data for Integris Southwest Medical Center, as of 2018. Section clinical quality rating data, patient safety ratings and patient experience ratings are presented for this rating.

For inpatient conditions and procedures, there are three possible ratings: worse than expected, as expected, and better than expected. For this hospital the data for this category is:

- Worse than expected - 4
- As expected - 18
- Better than expected - 1

For patient safety ratings the same three possible ratings are used. For this hospital they are:

- Worse than expected - 3
- As expected - 9
- Better than expected - 1
