= Flint Creek Water Park =

Water park in Mississippi, United States

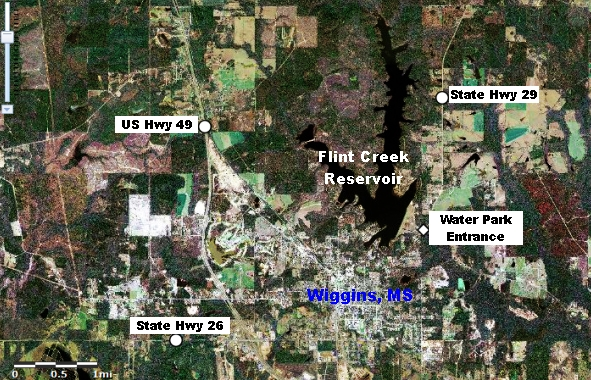
- Aerial view of Flint Creek Reservoir

- Location within Mississippi Location within the United States
- Location: Stone County, Mississippi
- Nearest city: Wiggins
- Coordinates: 30°52′17″N 89°07′17″W
- Area: 1,900 acres (770 ha)
- Established: 1969
- Visitors: 350,000—500,000 annually (in 2003)
- Governing body: Pat Harrison Waterway District
- Website: Flint Creek Water Park

Flint Creek Water Park, located in Wiggins, Mississippi, is part of the Pat Harrison Waterway District, which is a Mississippi State Agency providing outdoor recreation and management of the Pascagoula River Basin. The purpose of the nine water parks located in southeast and east-central Mississippi is to provide flood control, water management, and recreation.

This is not to be confused with the Flint Creek Waterpark in Colcord, Oklahoma on the Flint Creek that flows through Arkansas and Oklahoma.

== Description ==
The 1,900-acre (7.7 km^{2}) Flint Creek Water Park provides a wide assortment of outdoor recreational opportunities, most focusing on water sports. The 600-acre (2.4 km^{2}) Flint Creek Reservoir is created by an earthen dam impounding the headwaters of Flint Creek, which flows south into Red Creek, a tributary of the Pascagoula River.

The lake is stocked with popular southern sporting fish: largemouth bass, bluegill, crappie, and catfish. The swimming area, which is seasonally open, features several water slides suitable for either children or adults. A nature trail provides visitors with an opportunity to enjoy outdoor scenery, plants, and wildlife. There are several options for overnight visitors— 156 Class A RV campsites, 40 primitive campsites, 34 vacation cabins and 12 camphouses. A picnic area with tables and barbecue pits is also available for day use.

In May 2015, Splash of Fun opened within the Water Park and replaced Water Town recreation area. Splash of Fun recreation amenities include water slides, a swimming pool, lazy-river tubing, and a putt-putt golf course.

In 2024, the Water Park opened its 18-hole Cheona Trails Disc Golf Course designed by Bo Kirk.

Flint Creek Water Park is about 2 miles (3 kilometers) from the Wiggins business district (via Highway 29), which provides a full complement of basic services. The Water Park is about 35 miles (56 kilometers) from the Mississippi Gulf Coast, accessible via U.S. Route 49.

== In popular culture ==
Two annual events are very popular with both visitors and the local community. A fireworks display celebrates the Fourth of July, and a haunted forest is offered the Saturday before Halloween.

Flint Creek Water Park served as a film location for the movies Shark Lake in 2015 and Hunt Club in 2022.

== Gallery ==
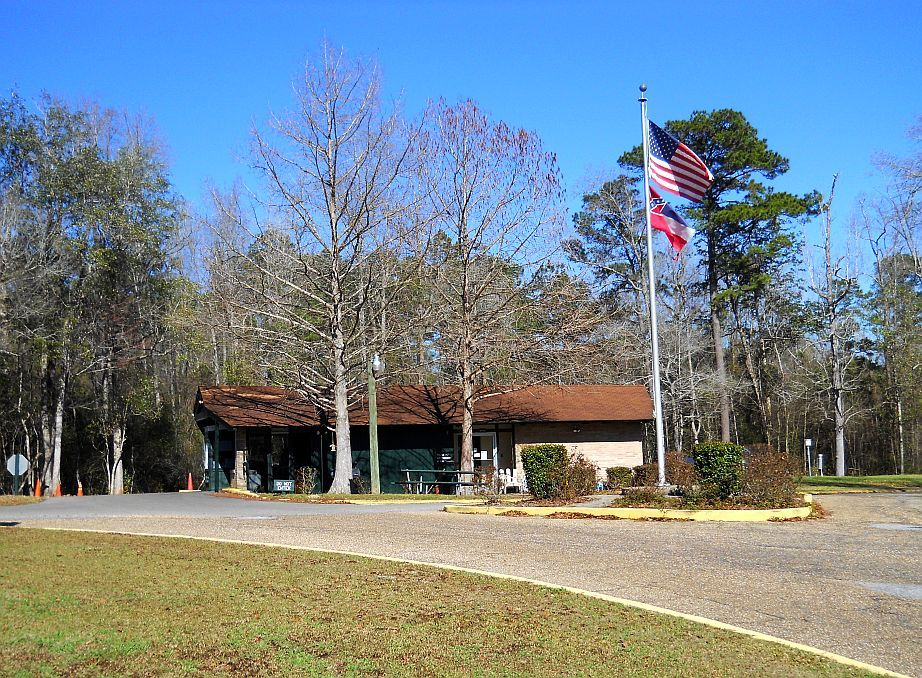
Entrance pavilion

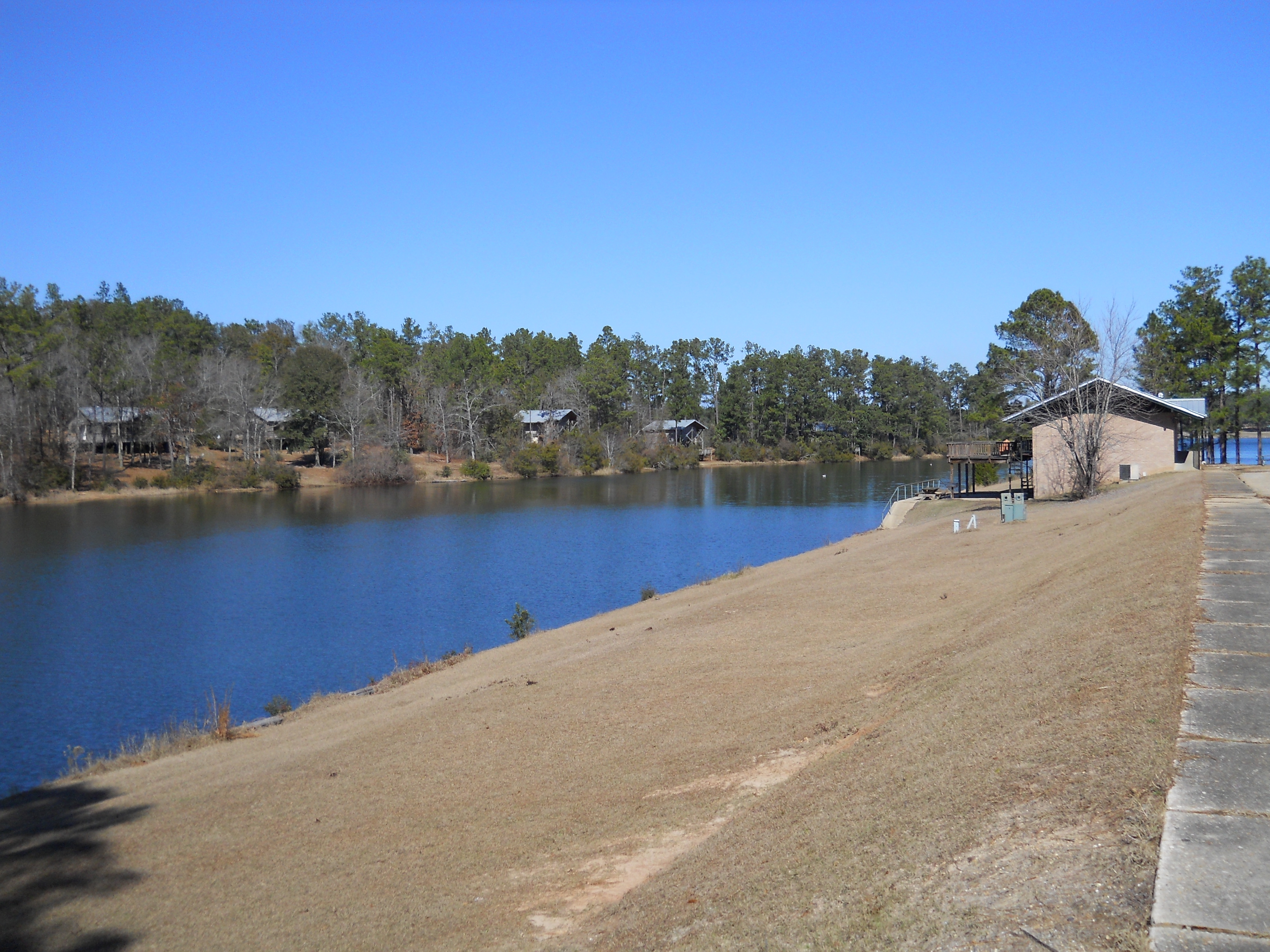
Rental cabins in background, along reservoir cove

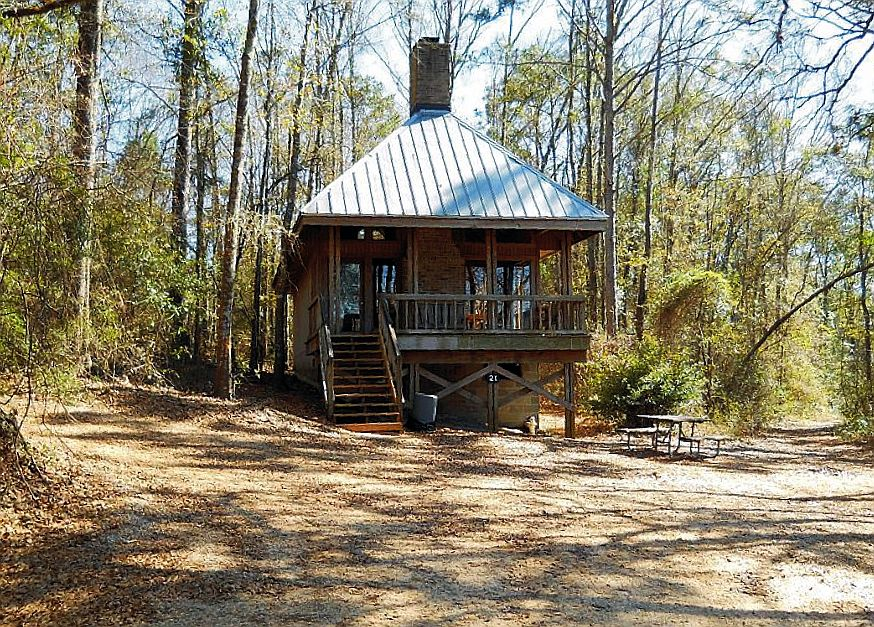
Rental cabin

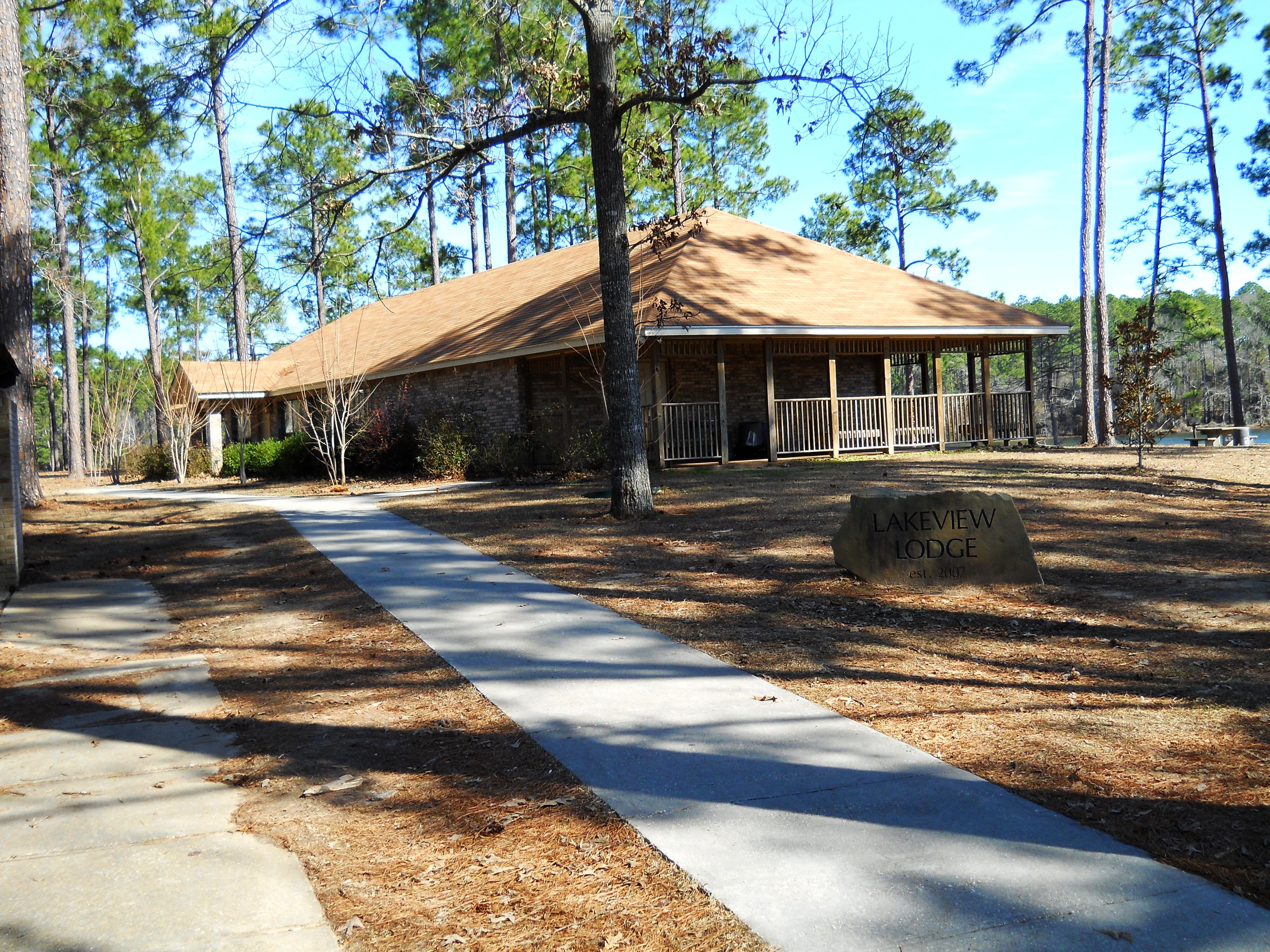
Lakeview lodge and conference center

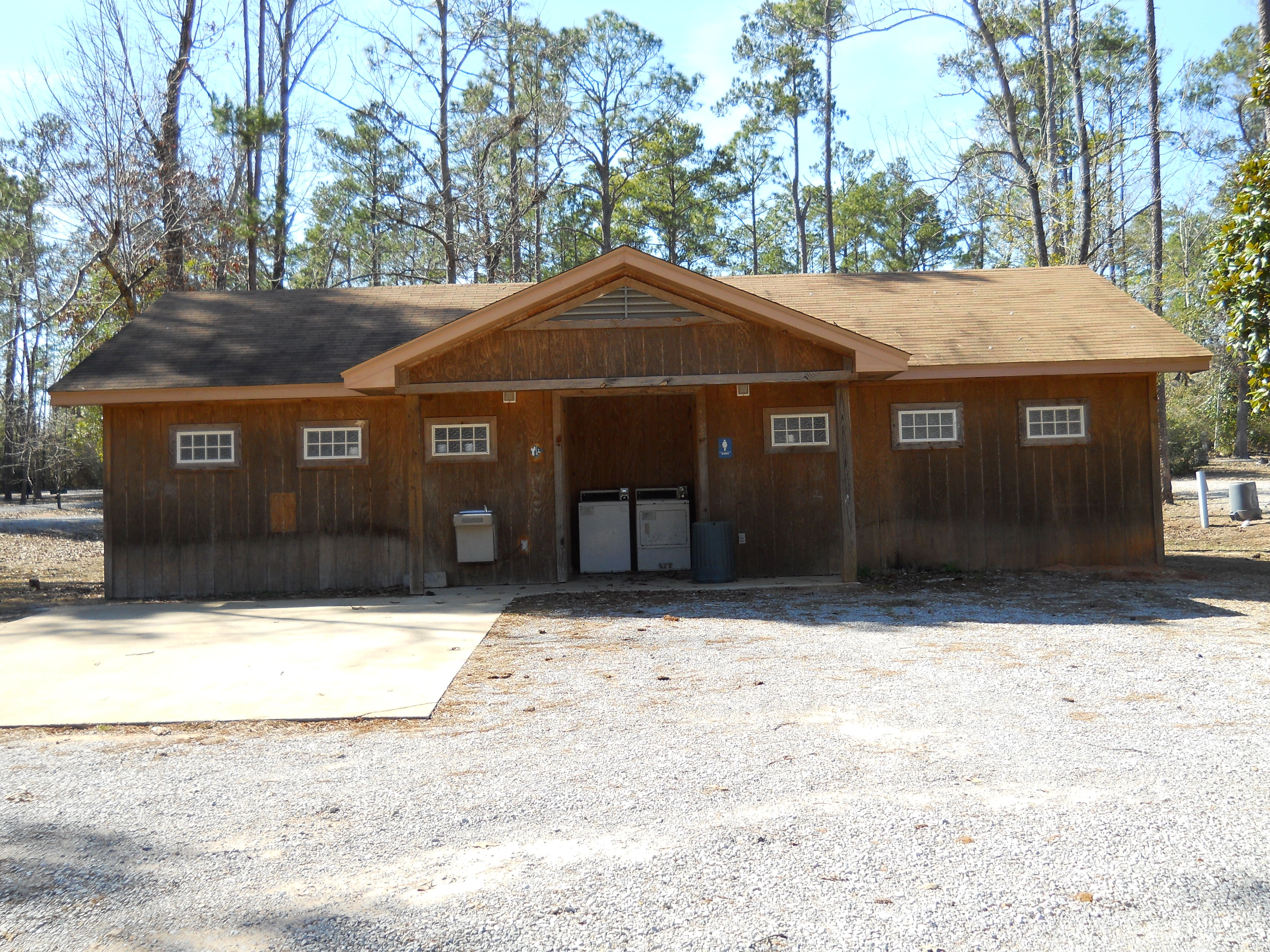
Restroom and laundry facility

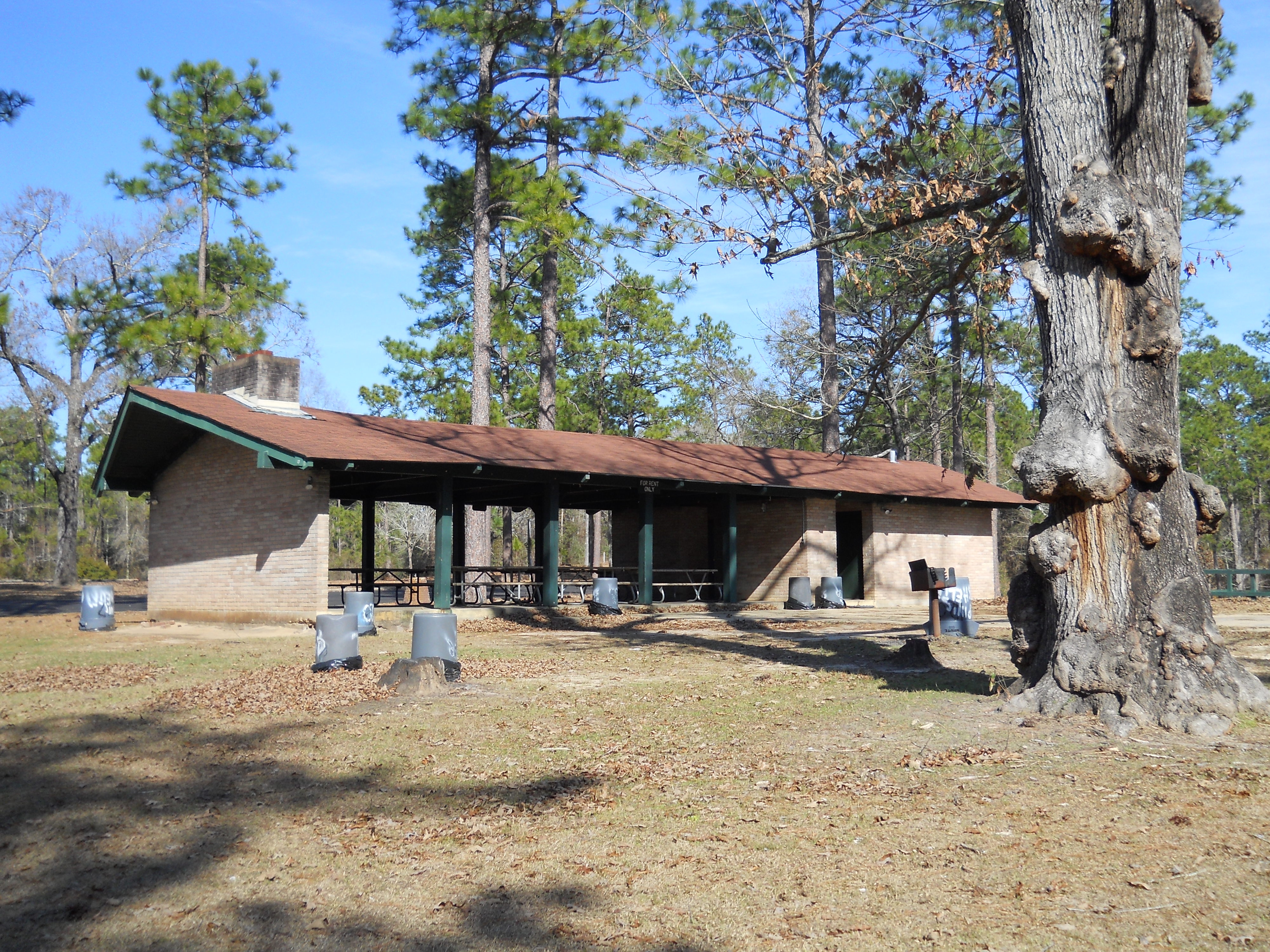
Picnic shelter

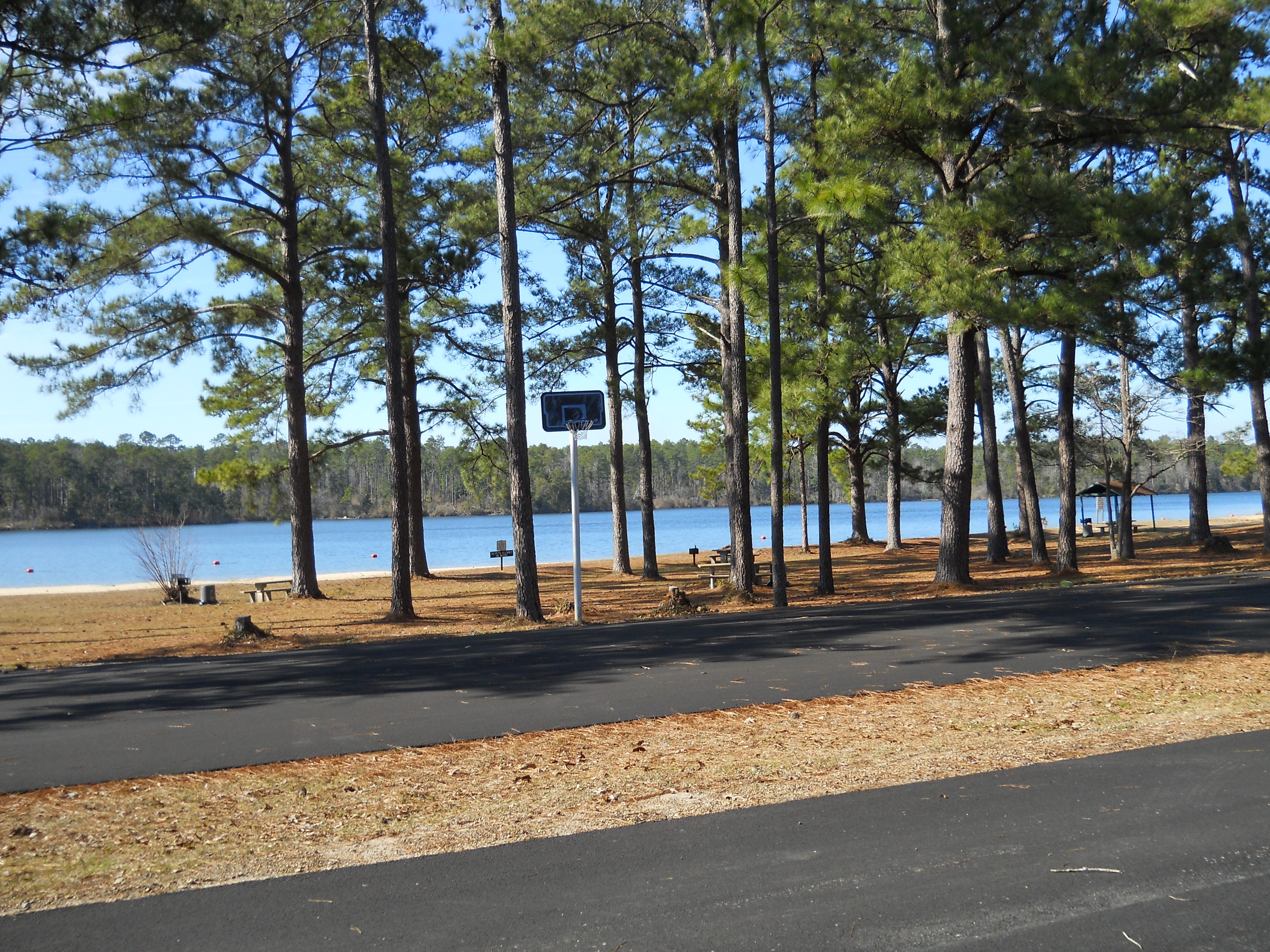
Picnic area

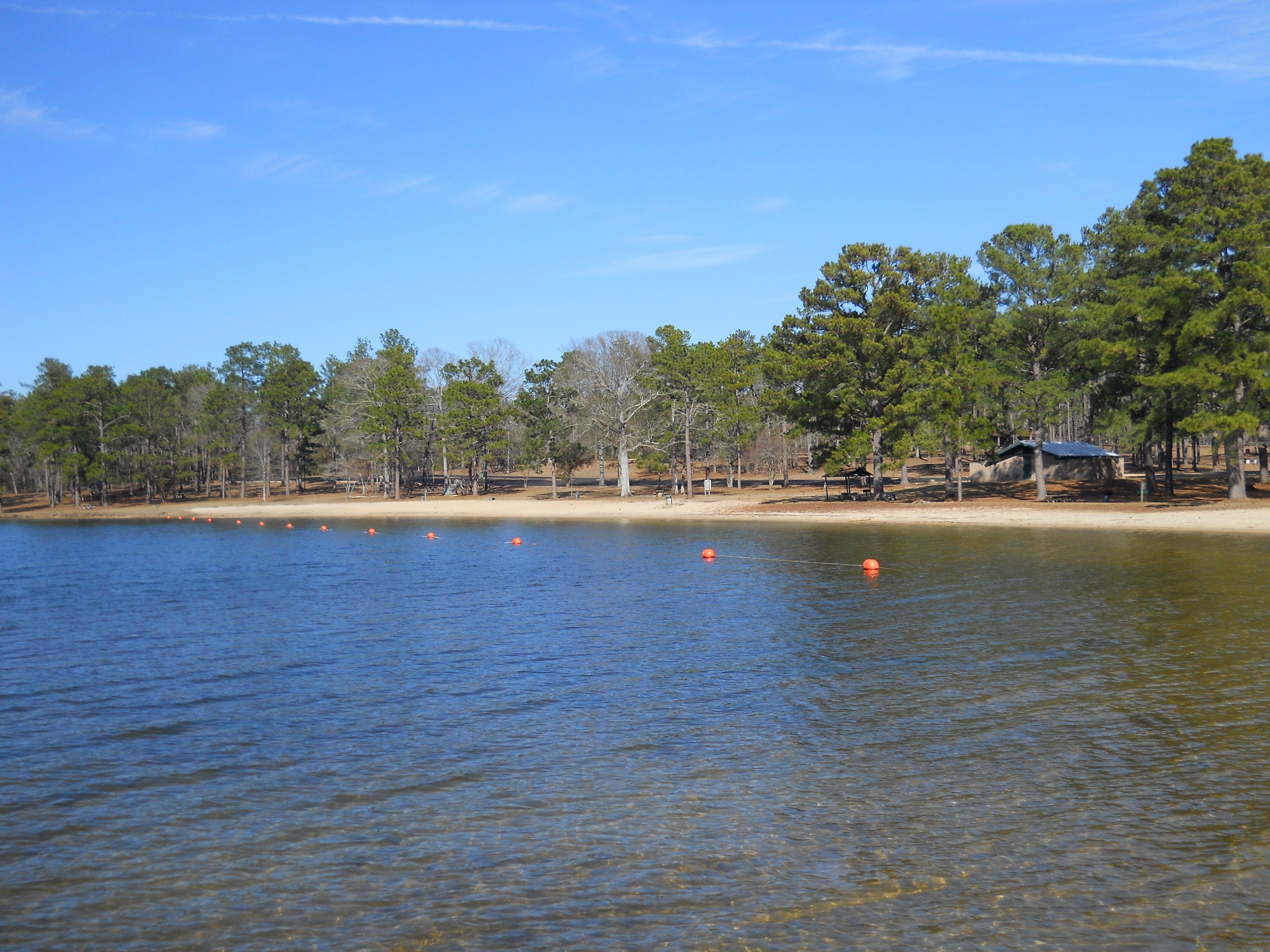
Designated swimming area
