= Colcord, Oklahoma =

- Town
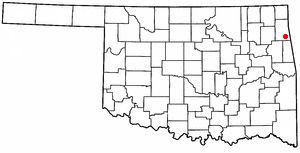
- Location of Colcord, Oklahoma
- Coordinates: 36°15′51″N 94°41′32″W
- Country: United States
- State: Oklahoma
- County: Delaware

Area
  - Total: 2.45 sq mi (6.35 km^{2})
  - Land: 2.45 sq mi (6.35 km^{2})
  - Water: 0 sq mi (0.00 km^{2})
- Elevation: 1,152 ft (351 m)

Population (2020)
  - Total: 728
  - Density: 296.9/sq mi (114.62/km^{2})
- Time zone: UTC-6 (Central (CST))
  - Summer (DST): UTC-5 (CDT)
- ZIP code: 74338
- Area codes: 539/918
- FIPS code: 40-16100
- GNIS feature ID: 2413224
- Website: www.colcordok.us

Colcord is a town in southern Delaware County, Oklahoma, United States. The community lies in the northeastern part of the state in a region known as Green Country. As of the 2020 census, Colcord had a population of 728.

== History ==
Colcord's history starts decades before the establishment of the town itself, with the community of Row, Indian Territory, in the 1890s. As settlers moved to the area, the town of Row grew and businesses formed, including a bank, a school, a hotel, and others. A Post Office was established on May 20, 1905.

In the 1920s, a road (later known as Oklahoma State Highway 116) was built that passed 1 mile (1.6 km) south of the then-healthy town of Row. A rural mail carrier, Charles Burbage, who owned land to the south where the new road was established, platted 64.8 acres (0.262 km^{2}) into blocks, lots and streets. The area grew into a community known as "Little Tulsa" to locals, until residents changed the name in September 1928 to "Colcord," after Charles Francis Colcord. Mr. Colcord was a successful and prominent cattle rancher, oil businessman, and early Oklahoma Territory lawman from Oklahoma City, who owned a large ranch west of the two towns. The ranch employed many local residents, and was very important to the economy and spirit of the area.

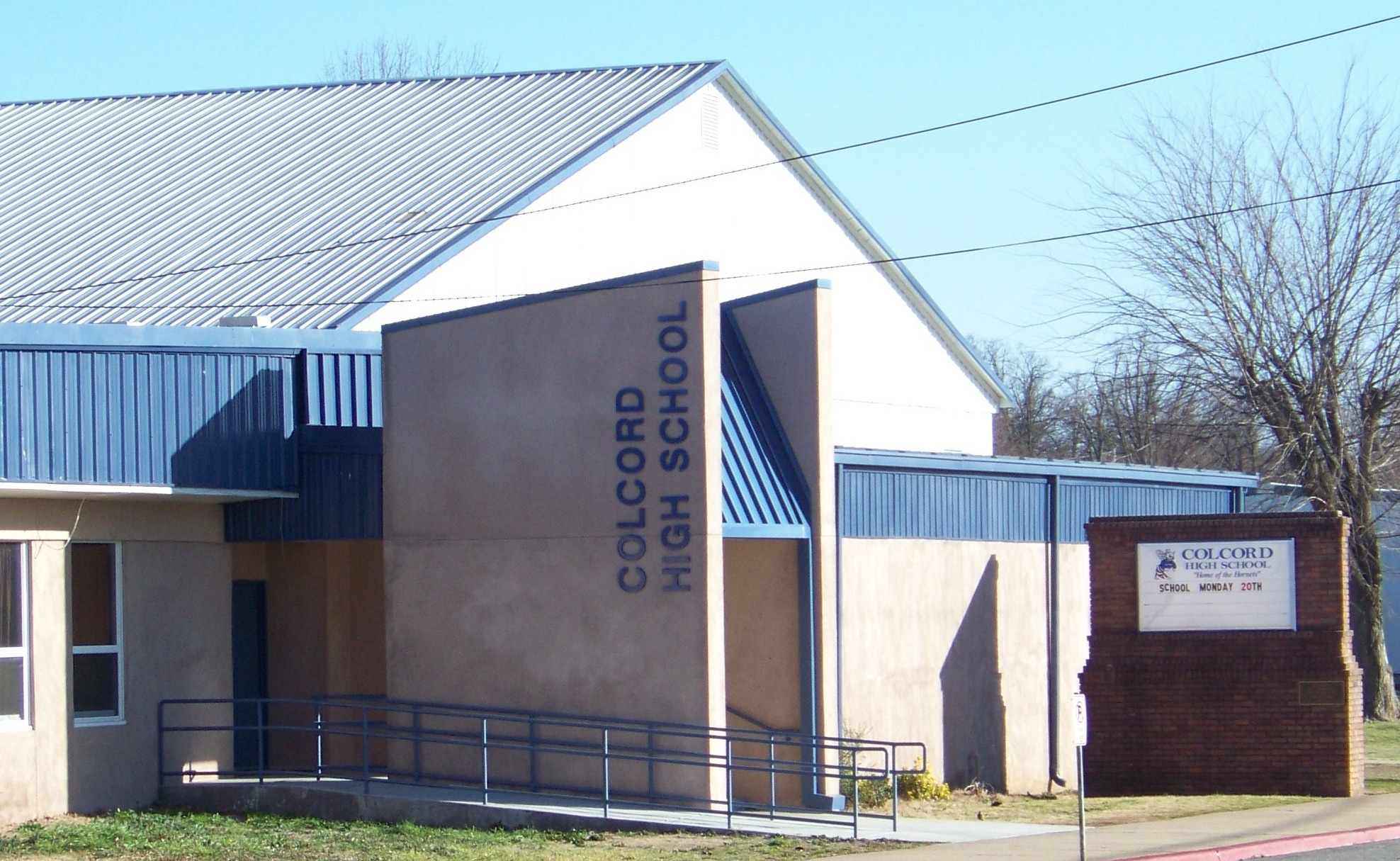
Colcord High School, August 2011

Due to better transportation and a disastrous fire that wiped out many buildings in Row, most businesses moved to Colcord, and the new town was approved to build a high school. A feud between the two towns ensued, and in the first eleven years of Colcord's existence, the school was involved in eleven lawsuits.

The community hosts "Old Settlers Day" celebration and parade on the second Saturday of June each year to honor its heritage and the many people that settled in the area and established the town.

== New Life Ranch Flint Valley ==
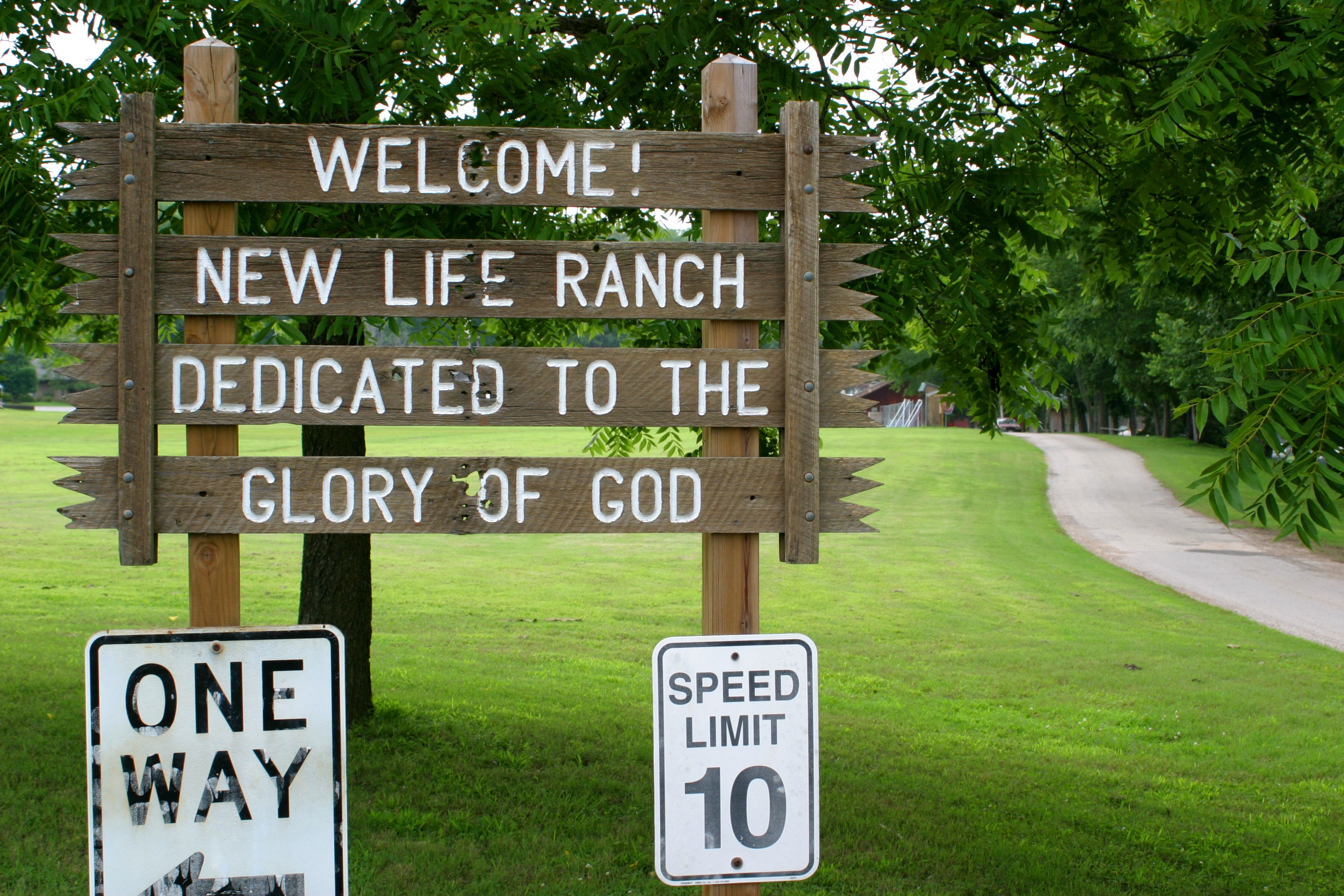
New Life Ranch Flint Valley

New Life Ranch Flint Valley (NLR) is a nearby 1,000-acre (4.0 km^{2}) Christian camp that functions as a summer camp for kids in grades 3-12 and a retreat center throughout the rest of the year. Children and teenagers from all over the United States attend the camp, participating in one-week resident sessions from June through August. In 2016, approximately 30,000 people attended camps and retreats hosted at NLR. Summer camp activities are primarily outdoor, including archery, biking, canoeing, rappelling, horseback riding, riflery, ropes courses, swimming, and tennis. As of August 2018, the owners of NLR also run New Life Ranch Frontier Cove, a similar camp in Adair, Oklahoma.

== Natural Falls State Park ==
Nearby is Natural Falls State Park, off Hwy 412 W at West Siloam Springs, one of the scenic wonders in the state of Oklahoma. The natural setting and scenic beauty of the waterfall is known to millions of movie lovers. The popular 1974 film Where the Red Fern Grows was filmed in part at Natural Falls (then called Dripping Springs).

== Hildebrand Mill ==
To the south of Colcord is Hildebrand Mill, a 1907 water-powered grain mill, later used up to 1967 as a gas-powered lumber mill. It is on the National Register of Historic Places listings in Delaware County, Oklahoma. Hilderbrand Mill, also known as Beck Mill, was the site where the legend of Cherokee citizen Zeke Proctor was born. Proctor shot a woman that reports say threw herself in between two gunmen.

== Geography ==
Colcord is located in southeastern Delaware County 9 miles (14 km) northeast of Kansas, 18 miles (29 km) southeast of Jay, the Delaware county seat, and 6 miles (10 km) west of the Oklahoma-Arkansas state line. it is on Oklahoma State Highway 116 east of US-59.

According to the United States Census Bureau, the town has a total area of 2.44 square miles (6.33 km^{2}), all land.

== Economy ==
The area surrounding Colcord is mostly farming and cattle, poultry and dairy operations.

== Demographics ==
Historical population
Census	Pop.	Note	%±
1960	173		—
1970	438		153.2%
1980	530		21.0%
1990	628		18.5%
2000	819		30.4%
2010	815		−0.5%
2020	728		−10.7%
U.S. Decennial Census

=== 2020 census ===
As of the 2020 census, Colcord had a population of 728. The median age was 38.4 years. 25.1% of residents were under the age of 18 and 14.7% of residents were 65 years of age or older. For every 100 females there were 97.3 males, and for every 100 females age 18 and over there were 96.8 males age 18 and over.

0.0% of residents lived in urban areas, while 100.0% lived in rural areas.

There were 275 households in Colcord, of which 36.7% had children under the age of 18 living in them. Of all households, 44.4% were married-couple households, 20.0% were households with a male householder and no spouse or partner present, and 26.2% were households with a female householder and no spouse or partner present. About 23.7% of all households were made up of individuals and 8.8% had someone living alone who was 65 years of age or older.

There were 317 housing units, of which 13.2% were vacant. The homeowner vacancy rate was 2.6% and the rental vacancy rate was 12.1%.

Racial composition as of the 2020 census
Race	Number	Percent
White	421	57.8%
Black or African American	1	0.1%
American Indian and Alaska Native	210	28.8%
Asian	8	1.1%
Native Hawaiian and Other Pacific Islander	0	0.0%
Some other race	3	0.4%
Two or more races	85	11.7%
Hispanic or Latino (of any race)	16	2.2%

=== 2000 census ===
As of the census of 2000, there were 819 people, 285 households, and 198 families residing in the town. The population density was 326.7 inhabitants per square mile (126.1/km^{2}). There were 322 housing units at an average density of 128.5 per square mile (49.6/km^{2}). The racial makeup of the town was 65.08% White, 0.12% African American, 25.03% Native American, 0.12% from other races, and 9.65% from two or more races. Hispanic or Latino of any race were 1.95% of the population.

There were 285 households, out of which 42.1% had children under the age of 18 living with them, 48.1% were married couples living together, 17.2% had a female householder with no husband present, and 30.5% were non-families. 26.7% of all households were made up of individuals, and 13.7% had someone living alone who was 65 years of age or older. The average household size was 2.87 and the average family size was 3.50.

In the town, the population was spread out, with 35.0% under the age of 18, 8.4% from 18 to 24, 29.4% from 25 to 44, 18.6% from 45 to 64, and 8.5% who were 65 years of age or older. The median age was 30 years. For every 100 females, there were 95.5 males. For every 100 females age 18 and over, there were 89.3 males.

The median income for a household in the town was $21,181, and the median income for a family was $23,750. Males had a median income of $23,333 versus $17,045 for females. The per capita income for the town was $10,440. About 30.0% of families and 30.1% of the population were below the poverty line, including 29.8% of those under age 18 and 33.8% of those age 65 or over.
