= Pat Harrison (disambiguation) =

Pat Harrison may refer to:

- Pat Harrison (1881–1941), American politician from the state of Mississippi
- Pat Harrison (educationalist) (1932–2025), New Zealand educationalist
- Pat Harrison (tennis), British tennis player

== Other ==
- Pat Harrison Waterway District, a Mississippi state government agency named after the politician
