= West Siloam Springs, Oklahoma =

- Town
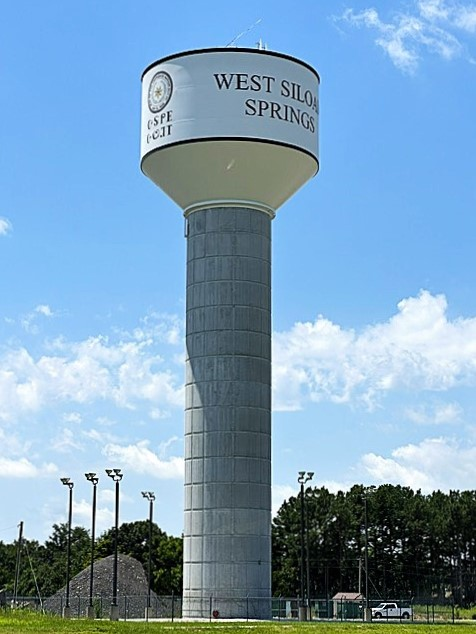
- West Siloam Springs water tower, 7-2026, with Cherokee lettering visible on side

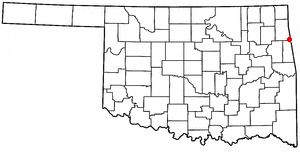
- Location of West Siloam Springs, Oklahoma
- Coordinates: 36°10′34″N 94°35′50″W
- Country: United States
- State: Oklahoma
- County: Delaware
- Established: July 10, 1969

Area
  - Total: 3.84 sq mi (9.94 km^{2})
  - Land: 3.84 sq mi (9.94 km^{2})
  - Water: 0 sq mi (0.00 km^{2})
- Elevation: 1,158 ft (353 m)

Population (2020)
  - Total: 1,000
  - Density: 260.5/sq mi (100.57/km^{2})
- Time zone: UTC-6 (Central (CST))
  - Summer (DST): UTC-5 (CDT)
- FIPS code: 40-80350
- GNIS feature ID: 2413468
- Website: westsiloamsprings.org

West Siloam Springs is a town in Delaware County, Oklahoma, United States. The population was 1,000 at the 2020 census, an 18.2 percent increase from the figure of 846 recorded in 2010. A bedroom community for Siloam Springs, Arkansas, it is notable for its Cherokee casino, and is the closest town to Natural Falls State Park.

== History ==
In the mid-20th century, the population of Siloam Springs, Arkansas spilled across the Oklahoma - Arkansas state line, creating the need for Oklahoma-based town government. The population of the community had grown to 142 by July 10, 1969, when 35 out of 49 eligible voters approved incorporation.

== Geography ==
West Siloam Springs is immediately west of Siloam Springs, Arkansas.

According to the United States Census Bureau, the town has a total area of 3.5 square miles (9.1 km^{2}), all land.

== Demographics ==
Historical population
Census	Pop.	Note	%±
1970	210		—
1980	431		105.2%
1990	539		25.1%
2000	877		62.7%
2010	846		−3.5%
2020	1,000		18.2%
U.S. Decennial Census

=== 2020 census ===
As of the 2020 census, West Siloam Springs had a population of 1,000. The median age was 41.3 years. 22.8% of residents were under the age of 18 and 21.4% of residents were 65 years of age or older. For every 100 females there were 89.8 males, and for every 100 females age 18 and over there were 86.5 males age 18 and over.

27.1% of residents lived in urban areas, while 72.9% lived in rural areas.

There were 354 households in West Siloam Springs, of which 35.6% had children under the age of 18 living in them. Of all households, 48.3% were married-couple households, 19.5% were households with a male householder and no spouse or partner present, and 23.4% were households with a female householder and no spouse or partner present. About 22.9% of all households were made up of individuals and 8.7% had someone living alone who was 65 years of age or older.

There were 412 housing units, of which 14.1% were vacant. The homeowner vacancy rate was 1.9% and the rental vacancy rate was 5.6%.

Racial composition as of the 2020 census
Race	Number	Percent
White	589	58.9%
Black or African American	3	0.3%
American Indian and Alaska Native	215	21.5%
Asian	9	0.9%
Native Hawaiian and Other Pacific Islander	2	0.2%
Some other race	33	3.3%
Two or more races	149	14.9%
Hispanic or Latino (of any race)	97	9.7%

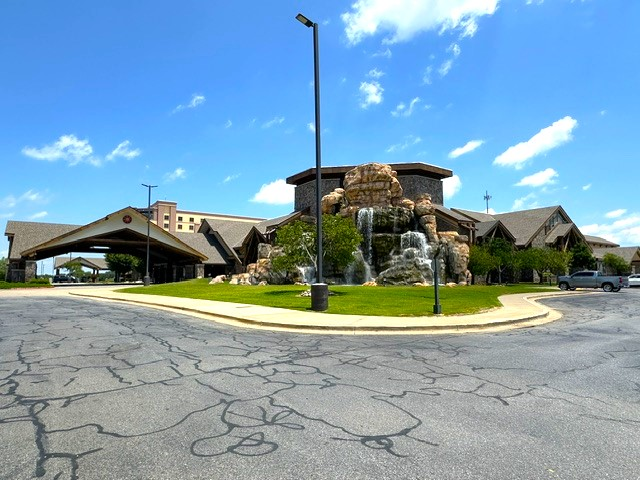
Cherokee Casino w/waterfall, July 2026

=== 2000 census ===
As of the census of 2000, there were 877 people, 306 households, and 205 families residing in the town. The population density was 253.9 inhabitants per square mile (98.0/km^{2}). There were 349 housing units at an average density of 101.1 per square mile (39.0/km^{2}). The racial makeup of the town was 76.40% White, 0.11% African American, 11.74% Native American, 0.57% Asian, 1.14% from other races, and 10.03% from two or more races. Hispanic or Latino of any race were 4.56% of the population.

There were 306 households, out of which 30.1% had children under the age of 18 living with them, 47.4% were married couples living together, 13.4% had a female householder with no husband present, and 33.0% were non-families. 26.8% of all households were made up of individuals, and 8.8% had someone living alone who was 65 years of age or older. The average household size was 2.45 and the average family size was 2.95.

In the town, the population was spread out, with 22.7% under the age of 18, 6.8% from 18 to 24, 27.1% from 25 to 44, 20.9% from 45 to 64, and 22.5% who were 65 years of age or older. The median age was 41 years. For every 100 females, there were 85.4 males. For every 100 females age 18 and over, there were 78.0 males.

The median income for a household in the town was $28,750, and the median income for a family was $31,953. Males had a median income of $22,243 versus $20,000 for females. The per capita income for the town was $12,858. About 13.4% of families and 18.3% of the population were below the poverty line, including 20.0% of those under age 18 and 26.2% of those age 65 or over.

== Transportation ==
The town is located on U.S routes 59 and 412.

Smith Field, a/k/a the Siloam Springs Municipal Airport, is approximately six miles to the east, and features a paved runway of almost 5000’. Commercial air transportation is available from Northwest Arkansas Regional Airport, about 24 miles to the east-northeast.

== Natural Falls State Park ==
Nearby is Natural Falls State Park, off Hwy 412 west of town. one of the scenic wonders in the state of Oklahoma. The natural setting and scenic beauty of the waterfall is known to millions of movie lovers. The popular 1974 film Where the Red Fern Grows was filmed in part at Natural Falls (then called Dripping Springs).

== Education ==
It is in the Moseley Public School school district.

== Hildebrand Mill ==
To the west of town about 10 miles is Hildebrand Mill, a 1907 water-powered grain mill, later used up to 1967 as a gas-powered lumber mill. It is on the National Register of Historic Places listings in Delaware County, Oklahoma.
