= Hildebrand Mill =

- U.S. National Register of Historic Places
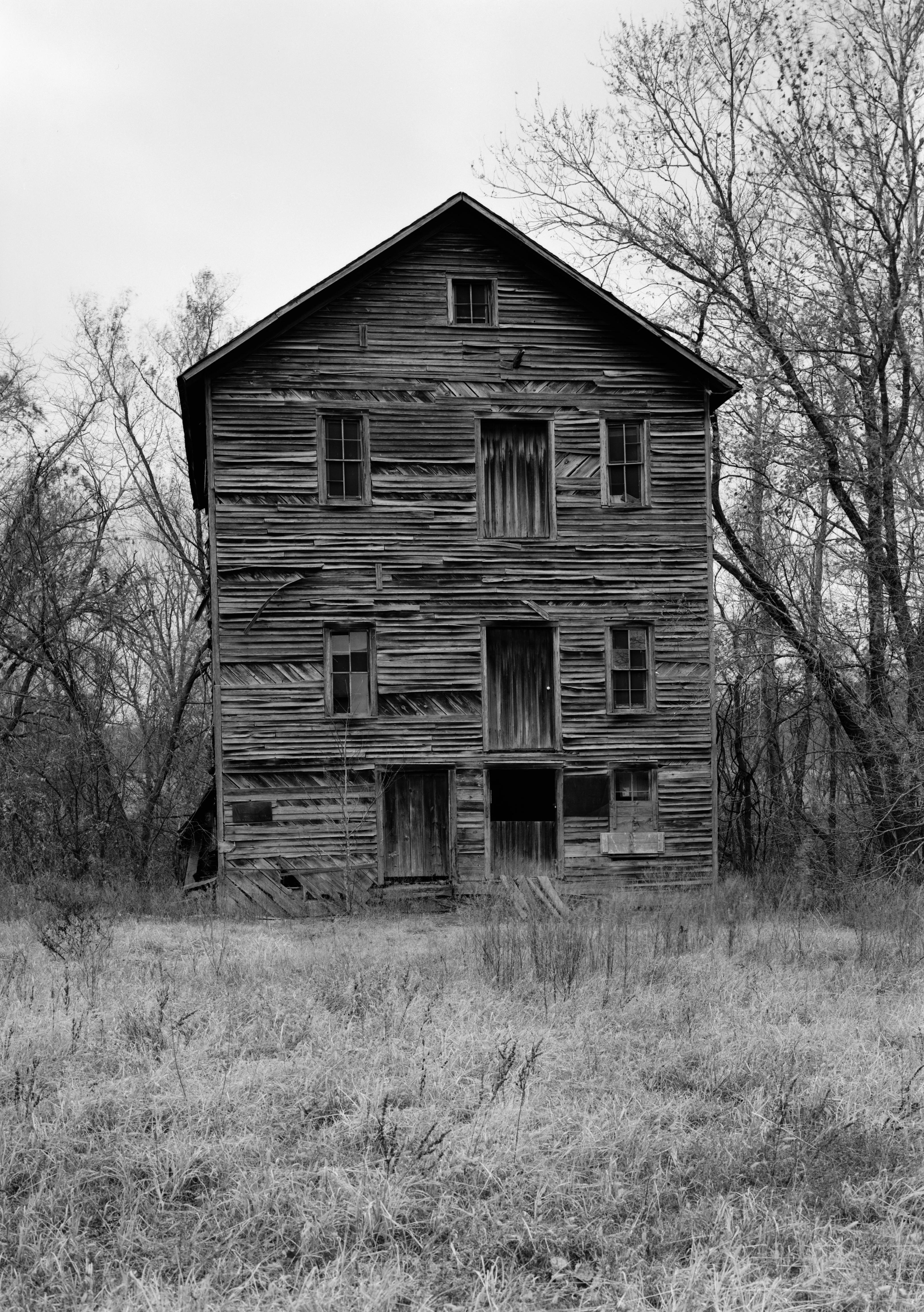
- Front of the Hildebrand Mill in 1979. Millrace came in from the right (north).

- Location within Oklahoma Location within the United States
- Nearest city: Siloam Springs, Arkansas
- Coordinates: 36°11′53″N 94°40′16″W
- Area: 5 acres (2.0 ha)
- Built: 1907
- NRHP reference No.: 72001062
- Added to NRHP: October 18, 1972

The Hildebrand Mill on Flint Creek in Colcord, Delaware County, Oklahoma was built c. 1845 and served hill people of the Old Cherokee Nation territory for more than 125 years. It is located not far from Siloam Springs, Arkansas. It was listed on the National Register of Historic Places in 1972.

The original millrace was 4 feet (1.2 m) by 4 feet (1.2 m) in dimension and poured onto an overshot wheel. It was expanded to a 8 feet (2.4 m) by 8 feet (2.4 m) flume that ran 300 feet (91 m) and powered a turbine.

It served as a lumber mill and as a grist mill, and it was used during the American Civil War in support of the commissaries of both the North and the South. Hildebrand and Proctor families feuded in the area.

The current building was built in 1907. Its last operation by water power was to mill grain, up to 1935. By gas-powered motor, it was used to cut lumber up to 1967.
