= Natural Falls State Park =

State park in Oklahoma, United States

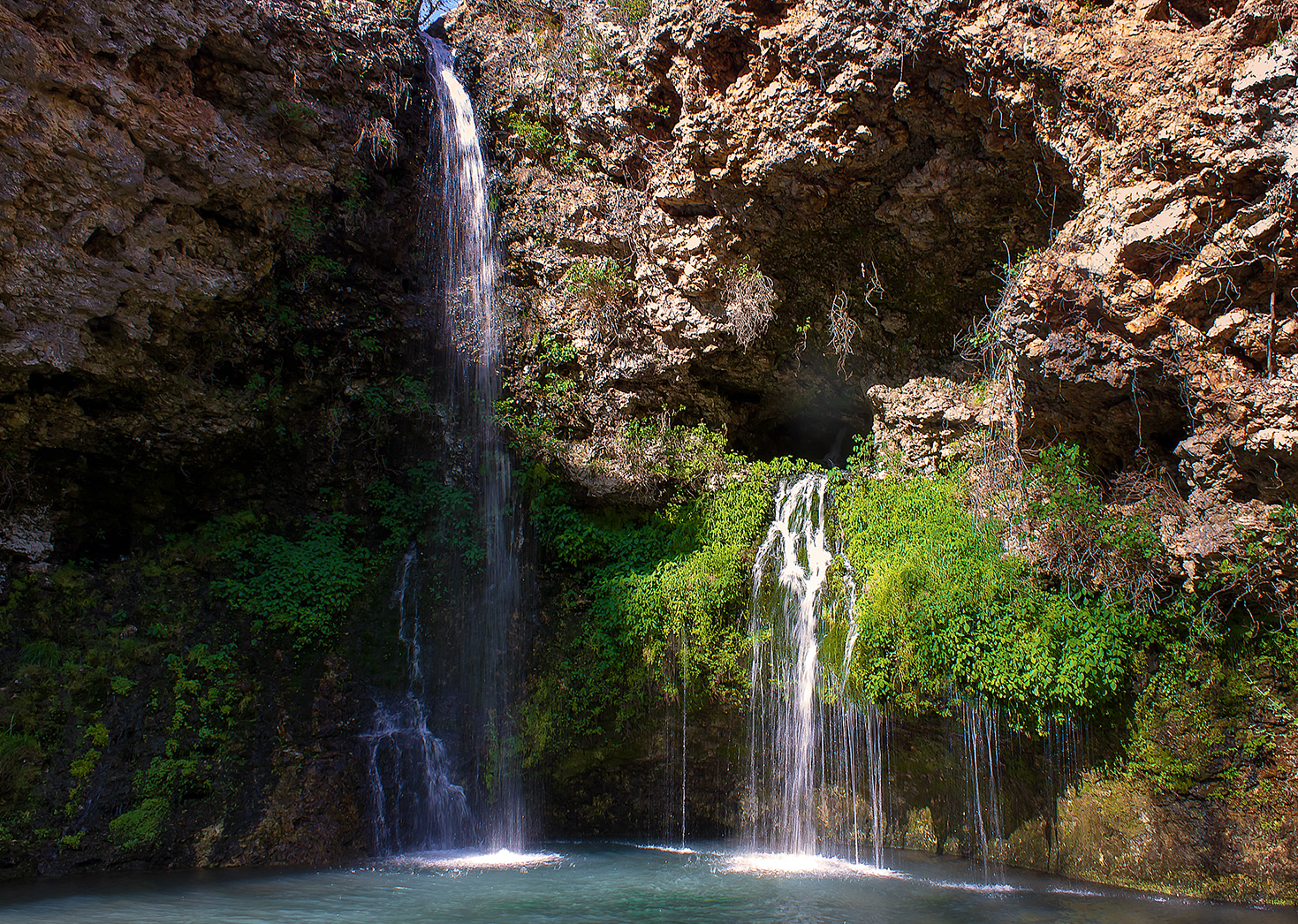
- Natural Falls

- Location within Oklahoma
- Location: Delaware County, Oklahoma, United States
- Nearest city: West Siloam Springs, OK
- Coordinates: 36°10′25″N 94°40′01″W
- Area: 120 acres (49 ha)
- Visitors: 98,025 (in 2021)
- Governing body: Oklahoma Tourism and Recreation Department
- Website: www.travelok.com/listings/view.profile/id.5293

Natural Falls State Park is a 120-acre (0.49 km^{2}) state-owned park in the Ozarks, in Delaware County, Oklahoma. It lies along U.S. Highway 412, near the Arkansas-Oklahoma state line. (Note: The nearest town in Oklahoma is West Siloam Springs, which is 6 miles (9.7 km) east of the park.) The property was privately owned and known as Dripping Springs until 1990, when the state bought it. The previous owners had also used the property as an attraction and rest stop for travelers on the highway, featuring a swimming pool and gardens. The site was used in the production of the 1974 film Where the Red Fern Grows.

== Features ==
Located in northeast Oklahoma in the scenic Ozark Highlands region, Natural Falls State Park features a 77-foot (23 m) waterfall cascading through rock formations and creating a hidden, serene atmosphere at the bottom of a narrow, V-shaped valley. An observation platform with a nearby picnic pavilion overlooks the falls and a deck with seating is available at the base of the falls. As the stream falls, enough evaporation occurs to drop the bulk liquid temperature about 10°F by the time it reaches the bottom. This maintains a cool, moist environment that is favorable to the growth of many types of flora in the valley. A graduate student from Oklahoma State University performed a plant study at the site about the time it was purchased by the state, and counted over 18 varieties of ferns alone. Since preserving the plant life is a priority for park management, swimming has been prohibited in the catchment ever since.

Picnic tables and grills can be found throughout the park. Campsites, including 44 recreational vehiclesites and 27 tent sites, and a comfort station with showers are also on site. The park also offers yurts for a rather unique overnighting experience, now called "glamping". Glamping is a portmanteau of glamour and camping. Although the word was added to the British vocabulary in 2005, it first appeared in the Oxford English Dictionary in 2019. It is a style of camping employed by wealthy travelers as far back as the 16th century in Scotland. At Natural Falls State Park, each yurt is a circular tent that sits above ground on a wooden deck. The different sizes accommodate from two to eight people. Each is equipped with beds, refrigerator, coffee maker, microwave, skylights, and even air conditioning. According to Tracey Robertson, park manager, the park installed five yurts, which can be rented by park visitors.

The Red Fern Reunion Center is available for group functions. A memorial featuring local Cherokee poet and artist Ronnie Pathkiller is located within. Other amenities include a 3.5-mi-long (5.6 km) hiking and nature trail, picnic shelter, volleyball, horseshoes, basketball court, catch and release fishing, playgrounds, and formal garden area. Pets are allowed on a leash only.

The park affords an opportunity to observe a variety of plant and animal life. Hikers can find a dense forest of maples, chinquapin, and white oaks, while plants such as flowering dogwood, sassafras, coralberry, spicebush, redbud, and pawpaw blanket the cool forest floor. The waterfall creates a moist environment where ferns, mosses, and liverworts thrive.

It includes a waterfall, which is 77 ft (23 m) tall. This is one of the two tallest known waterfalls in the state, matching Turner Falls in the Arbuckle Mountains. The falls are known to local residents as Dripping Springs Falls, but the state renamed the park as Natural Falls to distinguish it from Dripping Springs State Park, now known as Dripping Springs Park, and other sites in Oklahoma with similar names. The park can pump water from the pool below the falls back to the top of the falls, to ensure that the waterfall is active all year long.

== Accessibility ==
Most visitors arrive by private auto, since no public transportation is available in the area. The park is located on U.S. Highway 412. A parking lot is about 150 feet (46 m) from the viewing platform at the head of the falls. The route complies with requirements of the Americans with Disabilities Act of 1990.

== Fees ==
To help fund a backlog of deferred maintenance and park improvements, the state implemented an entrance fee for this park and 21 others effective June 15, 2020. The fees, charged per vehicle, start at $10 per day for a single day or $8 for residents with an Oklahoma license plate or Oklahoma tribal plate. Fees are waived for honorably discharged veterans and Oklahoma residents 62 and older and their spouses. Passes good for three days or a week are also available; annual passes good at all 22 state parks charging fees are offered at a cost of $75 for out-of-state visitors or $60 for Oklahoma residents. The 22 parks are:

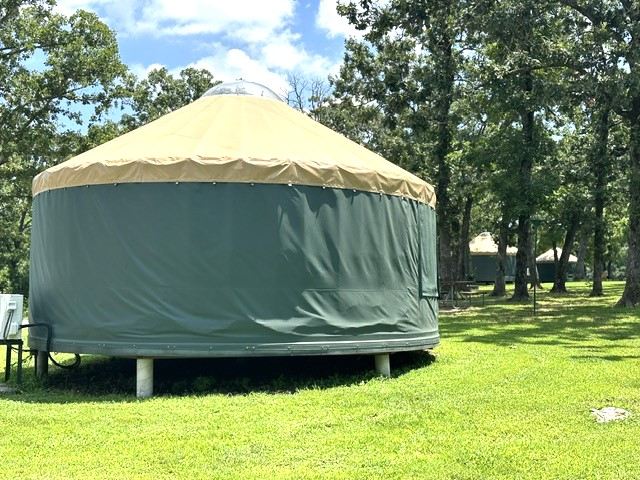
Yurt accommodations at Natural Falls State Park, 7-2026

- Arrowhead Area at Lake Eufaula State Park
- Beavers Bend State Park
- Boiling Springs State Park
- Cherokee Landing State Park
- Fort Cobb State Park
- Foss State Park
- Honey Creek Area at Grand Lake State Park
- Great Plains State Park
- Great Salt Plains State Park
- Greenleaf State Park
- Keystone State Park
- Lake Eufaula State Park
- Lake Murray State Park
- Lake Texoma State Park
- Lake Thunderbird State Park
- Lake Wister State Park
- Natural Falls State Park
- Osage Hills State Park
- Robbers Cave State Park
- Sequoyah State Park
- Tenkiller State Park
- Twin Bridges Area at Grand Lake State Park

== See also ==
- Glamping
- Yurt
