= Retrop, Oklahoma =

Unincorporated community in Oklahoma, US

Retrop
- Unincorporated community
- Location in Oklahoma Location in the United States
- Coordinates: 35°09′35″N 99°21′35″W
- Country: United States
- State: Oklahoma
- County: Washita and Beckham
- Elevation: 1,788 ft (545 m)
- Time zone: UTC-6 (Central (CST))
  - Summer (DST): UTC-5 (CDT)
- GNIS feature ID: 1097177

Retrop is a community in Oklahoma, United States located on the Washita/Beckham county line. It is located at the southern junction between State Highway 6 and SH-55. Retrop receives its name from the original community (Old Retrop, 35.145331°N 99.342585°W) which is one mile south and one mile east in Washita County near the Retrop Cemetery. The Retrop Post Office (located at Old Retrop) existed from January 12, 1900, until February 28, 1905. The name is a reverse spelling of the surname of the first postmaster, Ira J. Porter.

== See also ==
- List of geographic names derived from anagrams and ananyms
