= Oklahoma State Highway 54 =

State highway in Oklahoma, United States

State Highway 54

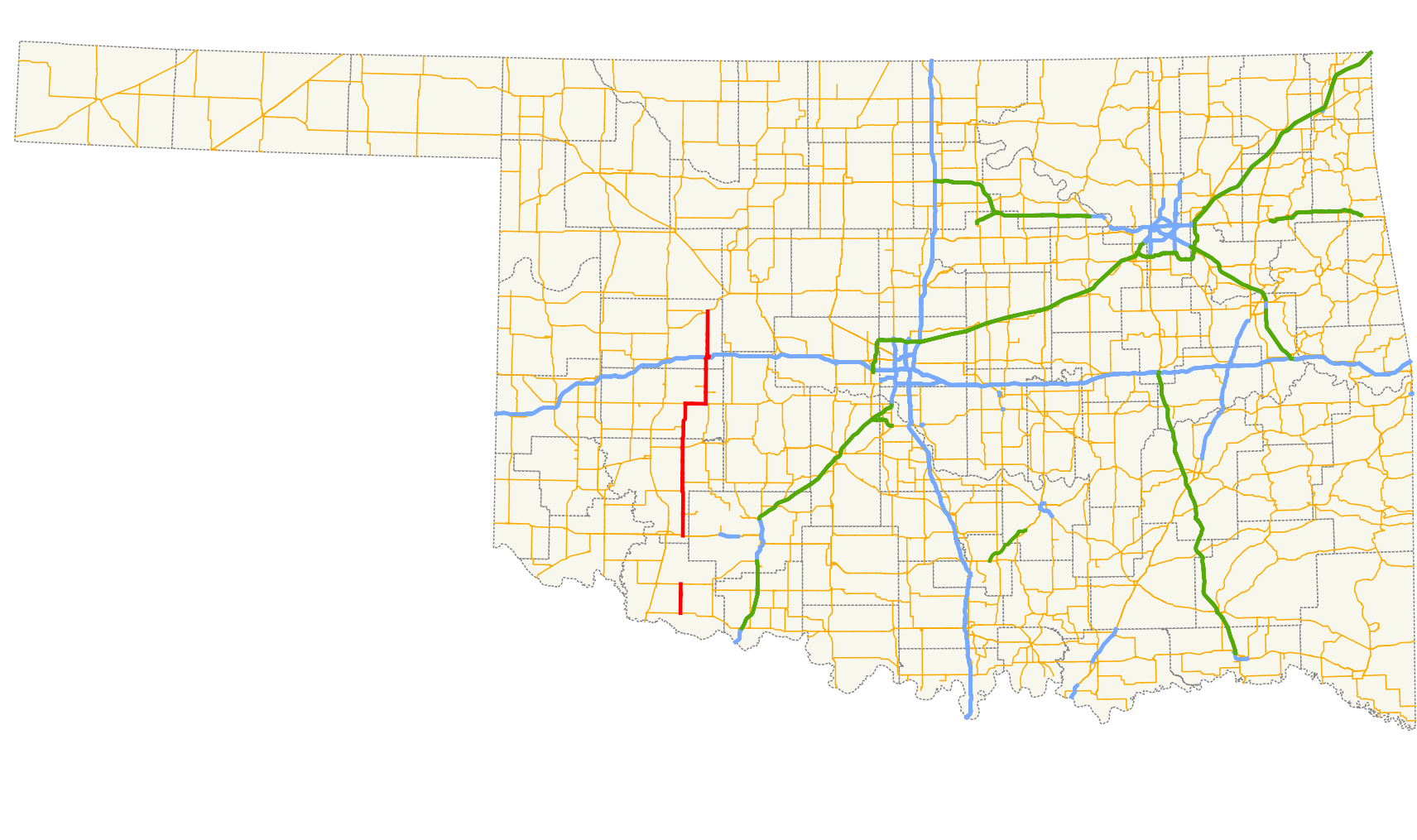

Route information
- Maintained by ODOT

Section 1
- Length: 9.96 mi (16.03 km)
- South end: US 70 west of Grandfield
- North end: SH-5 north of Hollister

Section 2
- Length: 85.5 mi (137.6 km)
- South end: US 62 east of Snyder
- Major intersections: SH-9 in Gotebo; I-40 in Weatherford
- North end: SH-33 near Thomas

Location
- Country: United States
- State: Oklahoma

Highway system
- Oklahoma State Highway System; Interstate; US; State; Turnpikes
← US 54	→ SH-55

State Highway 54 (abbreviated SH-54 or OK-54) is a state highway in western Oklahoma. Running north–south, it exists in two parts, which lie at approximately the same longitude. The southern section's length is 9.96 miles (16.03 km), while the northern section runs for 85.5 miles (137.6 km), for a combined length of 95.5 miles (153.7 km). The northern section has two lettered spur routes.

== Route descriptions ==
=== Southern section ===
The southern section of State Highway 54 runs for just under ten miles (16 km), entirely within Tillman County. The highway begins at US-70 and runs north. Midway through the route's extent, it passes through the town of Hollister, where it crosses a railroad track. The highway terminates at SH-5 east of Frederick.

=== Northern section ===
The northern section of SH-54 runs for 85.5 miles (137.6 km). It begins at US-62 east of Snyder in Kiowa County. From this point, it heads due northward to pass the western terminus of State Highway 49. For 3 miles (4.8 km) through Cooperton it overlaps State Highway 19. Continuing northward, it crosses over Rainy Mountain Creek. It then intersects State Highway 9 and its business loop near Gotebo. The highway then bridges the Washita River into Washita County.

At Lake Valley, SH-54 serves as the eastern terminus of State Highway 55. It then meets State Highway 152 eight miles (13 km) east of Cordell and turns eastward to overlap it for 7 miles (11 km). After splitting off, SH-54 heads northward, producing two spur routes to Corn and Colony.

The highway next enters Custer County, where it has an interchange with Interstate 40 at exit 80. It then runs along the western limit of Weatherford and continues 17 miles (27 km) north to end at State Highway 33 east of Thomas.

== History ==
The northern section of State Highway 54 was first commissioned on April 14, 1941. The original path of the highway began at US-277 in Cyril and proceeded west, intersecting US-62 in Apache. The highway then turned north, paralleling the Caddo–Kiowa county line, then turning east along SH-41. The highway turned north, meeting US-66 near Hydro, then following US-66 west through Weatherford. On the west side of Weatherford, the highway turned north along its current alignment.

SH-54 saw a substantial realignment on October 16, 1945, when it was shifted to the west onto its present alignment from US-62 southeast of Snyder to Weatherford, and on November 5 of that year, the old alignment of the highway was transferred to SH-58. Since then, only maintenance and minor realignment projects have occurred along its length.

The southern section was established in its entirety on October 15, 1956. It has never been connected to the northern SH-54.

== Junction list ==
=== Southern section ===
The entire route is in Tillman County.

Location	mi	km	Destinations	Notes
	0.00	0.00	US 70	Southern terminus
	9.96	16.03	SH-5	Northern terminus
1.000 mi = 1.609 km; 1.000 km = 0.621 mi

=== Northern section ===
County	Location	mi	km	Destinations	Notes
Kiowa		0.0	0.0	US 62	Southern terminus
Kiowa		7.4	11.9	SH-49	Western terminus of SH-49
Kiowa		15.5	24.9	SH-19	Southern end of SH-19 concurrency
Kiowa		18.5	29.8	SH-19	Northern end of SH-19 concurrency
Kiowa	Gotebo	30.5	49.1	SH-9	
Washita	Lake Valley	37.7	60.7	SH-55	Eastern terminus of SH-55
Washita		45.9	73.9	SH-152	Western end of SH-152 concurrency
Washita		52.9	85.1	SH-152	Eastern end of SH-152 concurrency
Washita				SH-54B	Western terminus of SH-54B
Washita				SH-54A	Eastern terminus of SH-54A
Custer	Weatherford	68.8	110.7	I-40	I-40 exit 80
Custer	Thomas	85.5	137.6	SH-33	Northern terminus
1.000 mi = 1.609 km; 1.000 km = 0.621 mi: Concurrency terminus

== Spur routes ==
SH-54 has two lettered spur routes, both of which branch off the northern section of SH-54. Both were once part of the now-decommissioned SH-69.

- SH-54A runs west from SH-54 for 3.50 miles (5.63 km) to Corn.
- SH-54B runs east from SH-54 for 3.27 miles (5.26 km) to Colony.
