= Sentinel, Oklahoma =

- Town
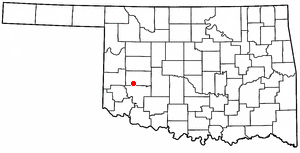
- Location of Sentinel, Oklahoma
- Coordinates: 35°09′25″N 99°10′25″W
- Country: United States
- State: Oklahoma
- County: Washita

Area
  - Total: 0.62 sq mi (1.61 km^{2})
  - Land: 0.62 sq mi (1.61 km^{2})
  - Water: 0 sq mi (0.00 km^{2})
- Elevation: 1,663 ft (507 m)

Population (2020)
  - Total: 763
  - Density: 1,225.8/sq mi (473.27/km^{2})
- Time zone: UTC-6 (Central (CST))
  - Summer (DST): UTC-5 (CDT)
- ZIP code: 73664
- Area code: 580
- FIPS code: 40-66400
- GNIS feature ID: 2413271

Sentinel is a town in Washita County, in the U.S. state of Oklahoma. As of the 2020 census, Sentinel had a population of 763. Towns near Sentinel are Rocky, Cordell, Canute, and Burnsflat.

== History ==
Located in southwestern Washita County, Sentinel lies at the intersection of State Highways 44 and 55. The town is primarily an agriculture-based community. The 1892 Cheyenne and Arapaho Opening brought non-Indians into the region. In 1898, R. B. Gore, a pioneer of Old Greer County, established a small general merchandise store in the area and applied for a post office. On March 6, 1899, the Post Office Department approved the application and designated the locale as Sentinel, Oklahoma Territory. The name originated from Cloud Chief's Herald-Sentinel newspaper. This store was approximately one mile east of the present town.

In 1901, the Kansas City, Mexico and Orient Railway, later bought by the Atchison, Topeka, and Santa Fe Railway, began purchasing rights-of-way and designating new townsites for a proposed railroad. The newly formed Orient Townsite Company chose the site of present Sentinel and received a donation of eighty acres from L. N. Whitmer. They named the new town "Barton" and filed a plat on September 23, 1901. The new residents asked Gore to relocate his store and post office to the new location. This caused confusion, as the town and post office had different names. In 1904, Will Hornbeck established the Sentinel News-Boy. Determined to correct the name problem, he started a petition to incorporate the town as Sentinel. In 1906, the voters approved this measure in an election. In August 1907, the town officially became Sentinel. At the 1907 statehood, it had 351 residents.

By 1908, the Orient had built their tracks through the village. In 1910 the population stood at 857, climbing to 1,269 by 1930. In 1911 residents supported two banks, a newspaper, electricity and telephone service, four grocers, two hotels, four general stores, among many other businesses and professionals. In 1935, a Civilian Conservation Corps camp was located just west of Sentinel. The population held above one thousand until 1970 when it registered 984. In 1967, the Rocky school consolidated into Sentinel School District. In 1961, the chamber of commerce began hosting an annual, large July Fourth celebration. In 2000, the population stood at 859.

== Geography ==
According to the United States Census Bureau, the town has a total area of 0.6 square miles (1.6 km^{2}), all land.

Sentinel is located in western Oklahoma's Washita County at the intersection of Highway 44 and Highway 55.

== Demographics ==
Historical population
Census	Pop.	Note	%±
1910	857		—
1920	723		−15.6%
1930	1,269		75.5%
1940	1,088		−14.3%
1950	1,131		4.0%
1960	1,154		2.0%
1970	984		−14.7%
1980	1,016		3.3%
1990	960		−5.5%
2000	859		−10.5%
2010	901		4.9%
2020	763		−15.3%
U.S. Decennial Census

=== 2020 census ===
As of the 2020 census, Sentinel had a population of 763. The median age was 34.5 years. 29.9% of residents were under the age of 18 and 18.1% of residents were 65 years of age or older. For every 100 females there were 107.9 males, and for every 100 females age 18 and over there were 95.3 males age 18 and over.

0.0% of residents lived in urban areas, while 100.0% lived in rural areas.

There were 309 households in Sentinel, of which 36.2% had children under the age of 18 living in them. Of all households, 44.0% were married-couple households, 22.0% were households with a male householder and no spouse or partner present, and 29.4% were households with a female householder and no spouse or partner present. About 32.1% of all households were made up of individuals and 14.9% had someone living alone who was 65 years of age or older.

There were 359 housing units, of which 13.9% were vacant. The homeowner vacancy rate was 4.4% and the rental vacancy rate was 7.1%.

Racial composition as of the 2020 census
Race	Number	Percent
White	563	73.8%
Black or African American	2	0.3%
American Indian and Alaska Native	33	4.3%
Asian	2	0.3%
Native Hawaiian and Other Pacific Islander	0	0.0%
Some other race	99	13.0%
Two or more races	64	8.4%
Hispanic or Latino (of any race)	161	21.1%

=== 2000 census ===
As of the census of 2000, there were 859 people, 346 households, and 256 families residing in the town. The population density was 1,399.0 inhabitants per square mile (540.2/km^{2}). There were 411 housing units at an average density of 669.4 per square mile (258.5/km^{2}). The racial makeup of the town was 88.01% White, 0.12% African American, 3.03% Native American, 5.47% from other races, and 3.38% from two or more races. Hispanic or Latino of any race were 11.29% of the population.

There were 346 households, out of which 32.9% had children under the age of 18 living with them, 60.1% were married couples living together, 11.0% had a female householder with no husband present, and 26.0% were non-families. 24.3% of all households were made up of individuals, and 16.5% had someone living alone who was 65 years of age or older. The average household size was 2.48 and the average family size was 2.93.

In the town, the population was spread out, with 26.5% under the age of 18, 7.9% from 18 to 24, 23.7% from 25 to 44, 22.8% from 45 to 64, and 19.0% who were 65 years of age or older. The median age was 39 years. For every 100 females, there were 93.5 males. For every 100 females age 18 and over, there were 87.8 males.

The median income for a household in the town was $29,265, and the median income for a family was $34,531. Males had a median income of $23,846 versus $19,250 for females. The per capita income for the town was $14,122. About 15.4% of families and 17.8% of the population were below the poverty line, including 31.6% of those under age 18 and 5.5% of those age 65 or over.

== Schools ==
The Sentinel School District has a large geographic area consisting of over 200 square miles (520 km^{2}). The present school plant was constructed in the 1960s. Sentinel is a class 'A' school. Students from the communities of Sentinel, Port, Rocky, and Carter attend Sentinel Public Schools.

Sentinel public School is a member of the Western Technology Center District, which provides occupation-specific training for adults and high school students.
