= Oklahoma State Highway 92 =

State highway in Oklahoma, United States

State Highway 92

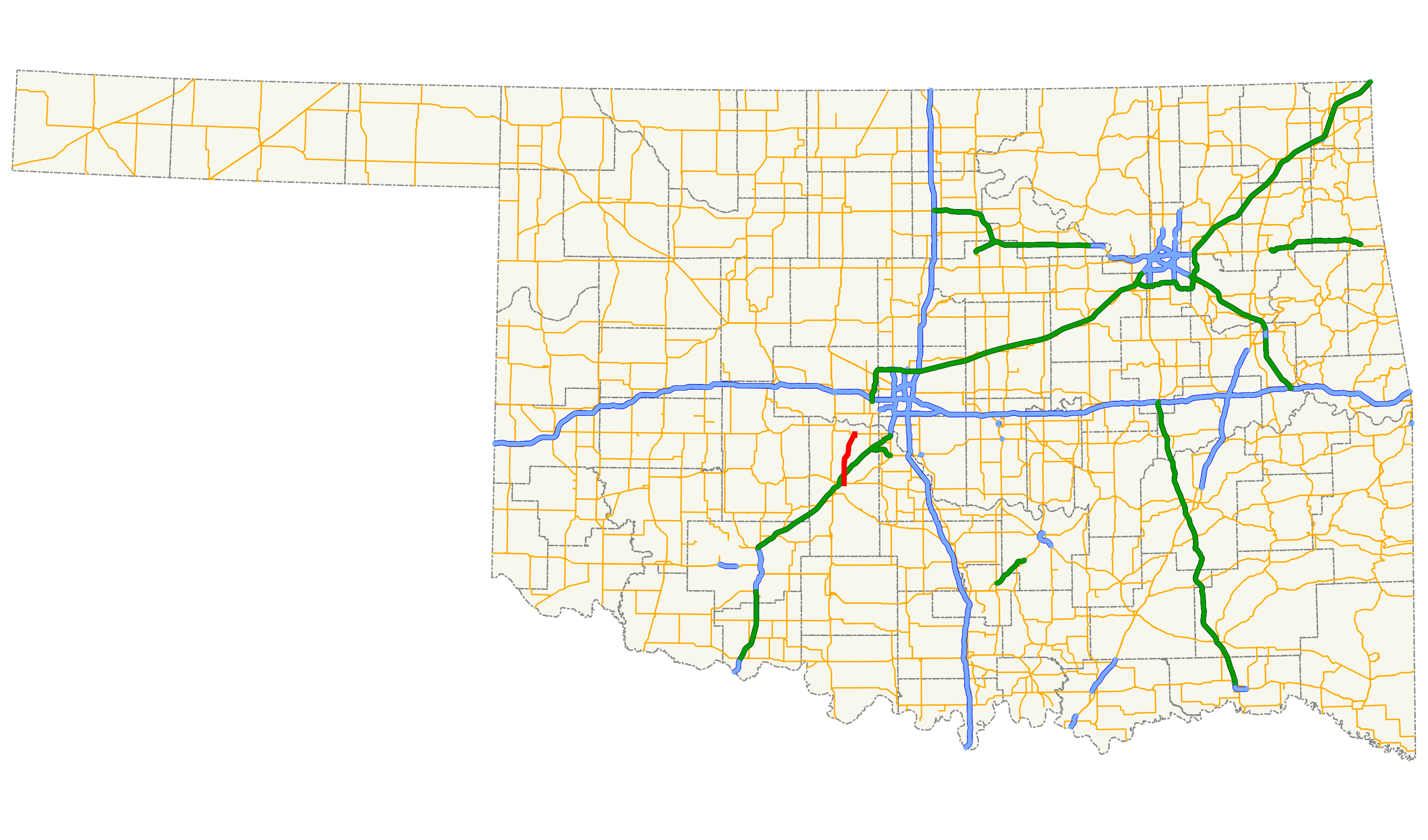

Route information
- Maintained by ODOT
- Length: 18.2 mi (29.3 km)

Section 1
- South end: US 62 / US 277 / SH-9 in Chickasha
- North end: SH-37 in Tuttle

Location
- Country: United States
- State: Oklahoma

Highway system
- Oklahoma State Highway System; Interstate; US; State; Turnpikes
← SH-91	→ SH-93

State Highway 92, usually abbreviated as SH-92 or OK-92 (or simply Highway 92), is a highway in the city of Chickasha. It is 18.2 miles (29.3 km) long and stretches from US-277/62 in Chickasha to SH-37 in Tuttle.

== Route description ==
=== Chickasha to Tuttle ===
SH-92 currently begins at an intersection with US-62/277/SH-9, a divided highway east of Chickasha. SH-92 heads northward from this intersection, passing through more rural regions, this time mainly fields and homes. Many of the intersections in this segment are county-maintained roads. Interstate 44 crosses SH-92 at an overpass with no interchange. After leaving I-44 behind, SH-92 begins to run alongside the Stillwater Central Railroad as it continues farther through rural regions, crossing through the village of Amber.

The highway leaves Amber, turning to the northeast for a short distance, changing directions several times. SH-92 passes through Sooner, with Tuttle soon after. In Tuttle, SH-92 intersects with local streets before terminating at State Highway 37.

== History ==
State Highway 92 was commissioned between late 1943 and June 1944. As originally commissioned, SH-92 began at US-62/277 east of Chickasha and ended at SH-37 in Amber, the same termini as the present day.

=== Former Lake Burtschi extension ===
SH-92 began at Lake Burtschi several miles outside of Cement. The highway turns east after the crossing with Lake Burtschi Road continuing farther north. SH-92 headed through downtown Laverty, which is mainly homes and small patches of trees once again. The highway turned northward once again, passing a small pond on its way to Chickasha. SH-92 curved to the east a second time soon after, crossing local roads and train tracks as it entered Norge.

In downtown Norge, SH-92 headed to the northeast, paralleling the nearby Interstate 44/H.E. Bailey Turnpike. The region around and north of Norge was rural, with very little development. SH-92 headed in different directions, mainly to the north/northeast. After West Country Club Road, the highway began to enter Chickasha, making a curve to the east onto West Grand Boulevard. The route continued eastward, becoming concurrent with US-81 and US-277 in Chickasha. Grand Avenue continued after. The route continued unsigned until the junction with US-62/SH-9, where it split away from US-81 to the east, following US-277.

This segment was not assigned until 1957. That segment of SH-92 was decommissioned in 2003, bringing the highway to its current southern terminus.

=== Former northern segment ===
The northern segment of SH-92 began at an intersection with State Highway 152 in Mustang, on the west side of the Oklahoma City Metro. The route headed north, intersecting with local roads as N. Clear Springs Road in Mustang. After leaving Mustang, it entered far western Oklahoma City, where the name of the road changed to S. Cemetery Road. This region of the city is also rural, passing fields and homes as the route continues northward. SH-92 did not intersect with any state highways during its length, but did interchange with Interstate 40 before terminating at an intersection with State Highway 66 in Yukon. In 2010, this section of SH-92 was canceled and given to the city of Yukon. Part of the former segment is dedicated to singer Garth Brooks as Garth Brooks Boulevard.

== Junction list ==
=== Current ===
The entire route is in Grady County.

Location	mi	km	Destinations	Notes
	0.0	0.0	US-62/US-277/SH-9	Southern section's southern terminus
Tuttle	18.2	29.3	SH-37	Southern section's Northern terminus
1.000 mi = 1.609 km; 1.000 km = 0.621 mi

=== Former northern segment ===
The entire route is in Canadian County.

Location	mi	km	Destinations	Notes
Mustang	0.0	0.0	SH-152	Northern section's southern terminus
Yukon	8.0	12.9	SH-66	Northern section's Northern terminus
1.000 mi = 1.609 km; 1.000 km = 0.621 mi
