= Oklahoma State Highway 115 =

State highway in Oklahoma, United States

State Highway 115
- SH 115 highlighted in red

Route information
- Maintained by ODOT
- Length: 57.2 mi (92.1 km)
- Existed: 1957–present

Major junctions
- South end: US 62 northwest of Cache
- SH-9 in Mountain View
- North end: SH-152 north of Cowden

Location
- Country: United States
- State: Oklahoma

Highway system
- Oklahoma State Highway System; Interstate; US; State; Turnpikes
← SH-113	→ SH-116

State Highway 115 (abbreviated SH-115 or OK-115) is a 57.2 mile (92 km) long state highway in western Oklahoma, passing through Comanche, Kiowa, and Washita Counties as well as the Wichita Mountains Wildlife Refuge. The highway has no lettered spur routes.

Most of the highway was established in 1957 as a gravel roadway. Between then and 1967, it was gradually paved. A portion of the highway through the Wichita Mountains was removed from the route in the mid-1960s, but was re-added in 1984.

== Route description ==
State Highway 115 begins at an interchange with U.S. Highway 62 (a freeway at this point) near Cache. It goes due north from here, passing through a remote part of Fort Sill before reaching the Wichita Mountains Wildlife Refuge. After entering the refuge, SH-115 is unsigned, appearing only as a nameless road. The road intersects State Highway 49 at the Cache Wye. Northbound motorists that continue straight at the intersection will be put on westbound SH-49; a right turn must be made to continue on northbound SH-115. SH-49 also turns at the Cache Wye, forming an effective concurrency with SH-49 (though neither highway has any signage). The two highways turn northeast, then curve back around to the east. SH-115 then splits off to the north, while SH-49 continues a general eastbound heading. SH-115 passes just east of Mt. Roosevelt and Mt. Sheridan before exiting the refuge, whereupon it regains its usual state highway signage.

After leaving the refuge, SH-115 passes through the town of Meers. For the remainder of its time in Comanche County, the highway follows an irregular northwest heading as it passes through the Wichita Mountains. Through the mountains, its winding route keeps the speed limit at 55 miles per hour (89 kilometres per hour). Just before crossing into Kiowa County, it runs alongside Saddle Mountain. It then crosses the county line and passes through the town of Saddle Mountain. Approximately 2 miles (3.2 km) north of the town, it overlaps SH-19 for one-mile (1.6 km). Three miles (4.8 km) north of the split, SH-115 turns due west for one-mile (1.6 km), crossing over Saddle Mountain Creek. The highway then turns back to the north; around 9.5 miles (15.3 km) north of this curve, it intersects SH-9. SH-115 turns west along SH-9 for one-mile (1.6 km) into Mountain View. After splitting away from SH-9 and leaving Mountain View, the highway crosses the Washita River into Washita County.

Approximately 3 miles (4.8 km) north of Mountain View, SH-115 turns east for one-mile (1.6 km) before resuming a due north course. The highway bridges Spring Creek, a tributary of the Washita River, then curves to the northeast. After turning back to the north, the road passes through Cowden, where it crosses Gyp Creek. Three miles (4.8 km) north of Cowden, it ends at SH-152 at a location called Cowden Junction.

== History ==
The first portion of what would become SH-115 was added to the state highway system in 1939 as part of SH-49. At this time, SH-49 began at US-62 in Cache proper (US-62 had not yet been shifted to the freeway north of town), entered the Wichita Mountains National Wildlife Refuge, then emerged near Medicine Park and followed the remainder of SH-49's present day routing.

The majority of SH-115, the entire extent from the SH-49 junction in the National Wildlife Refuge to Cowden Junction, was commissioned in 1957. As originally added to the system, only the portion of highway between the northern SH-19 junction and the Washita River bridge was paved. The remainder of the route, comprising the entirety of its route within Comanche and Washita Counties, was gravel. The section of SH-49 connecting to Cache to the refuge was renumbered to be part of SH-115 in 1962, giving the highway the same basic routing that it has today. The remaining gravel portions of highway were paved between 1965 and 1967.

In 1964, the portion of gravel roadway through the Wichita Mountains between Meers and the Comanche–Kiowa County line was removed from SH-115. The SH-115 designation would not be restored to this section of highway until 1984, by which time it had been paved.

== Junction list ==
County	Location	mi	km	Destinations	Notes
Comanche	Cache	0.0	0.0	US 62	Southern terminus; diamond interchange
Comanche	Wichita Mtns. NWR	4.8	7.7	SH-49 west	Southern end of SH-49 concurrency
Comanche	Wichita Mtns. NWR	8.1	13.0	SH-49 east	Northern end of SH-49 concurrency
Kiowa		26.7	43.0	SH-19 west	Southern end of SH-19 concurrency
Kiowa		27.7	44.6	SH-19 east	Northern end of SH-19 concurrency
Kiowa		41.2	66.3	SH-9 east – Anadarko	Southern end of SH-9 concurrency
Kiowa	Mountain View	42.4	68.2	SH-9 west – Gotebo, Hobart	Northern end of SH-9 concurrency
Washita	Cowden Jct.	57.2	92.1	SH-152 – Cordell, Binger	Northern terminus
1.000 mi = 1.609 km; 1.000 km = 0.621 mi: Concurrency terminus
