= Oklahoma State Highway 152 =

Highway in Oklahoma

State Highway 152
- SH-152 highlighted in red

Route information
- Maintained by ODOT
- Length: 149.2 mi (240.1 km)

Major junctions
- West end: SH 152 at the Texas state line
- I-40 in Sayre; US 183 in New Cordell; US 281 / SH-8 in Binger; US 81 from Minco to Union City
- East end: I-240 / I-344 / Kilpatrick Turnpike in Oklahoma City

Location
- Country: United States
- State: Oklahoma

Highway system
- Oklahoma State Highway System; Interstate; US; State; Turnpikes
← SH-151	→ SH-153

State Highway 152 (SH-152) is a state highway running through west-central Oklahoma. It begins at the Texas state line, serving as a continuation of Texas State Highway 152 and continues east to end at I-344 (John Kilpatrick Turnpike) in southwest Oklahoma City, a length of 145 miles (233 km). Along its route it serves three county seats: Sayre, Cordell and Oklahoma City (which is also the state capital). Near the east end, it passes through in the Oklahoma City suburb of Mustang before being its terminus on the east side of that town.

SH-152 was originally designated around 1927. It was initially numbered SH-41 and connected Sayre to Minco. SH-41 was extended east to Oklahoma City around 1934 and west to the Texas state line around 1938. The highway was renumbered to SH-152 in 1954.

== Route description ==
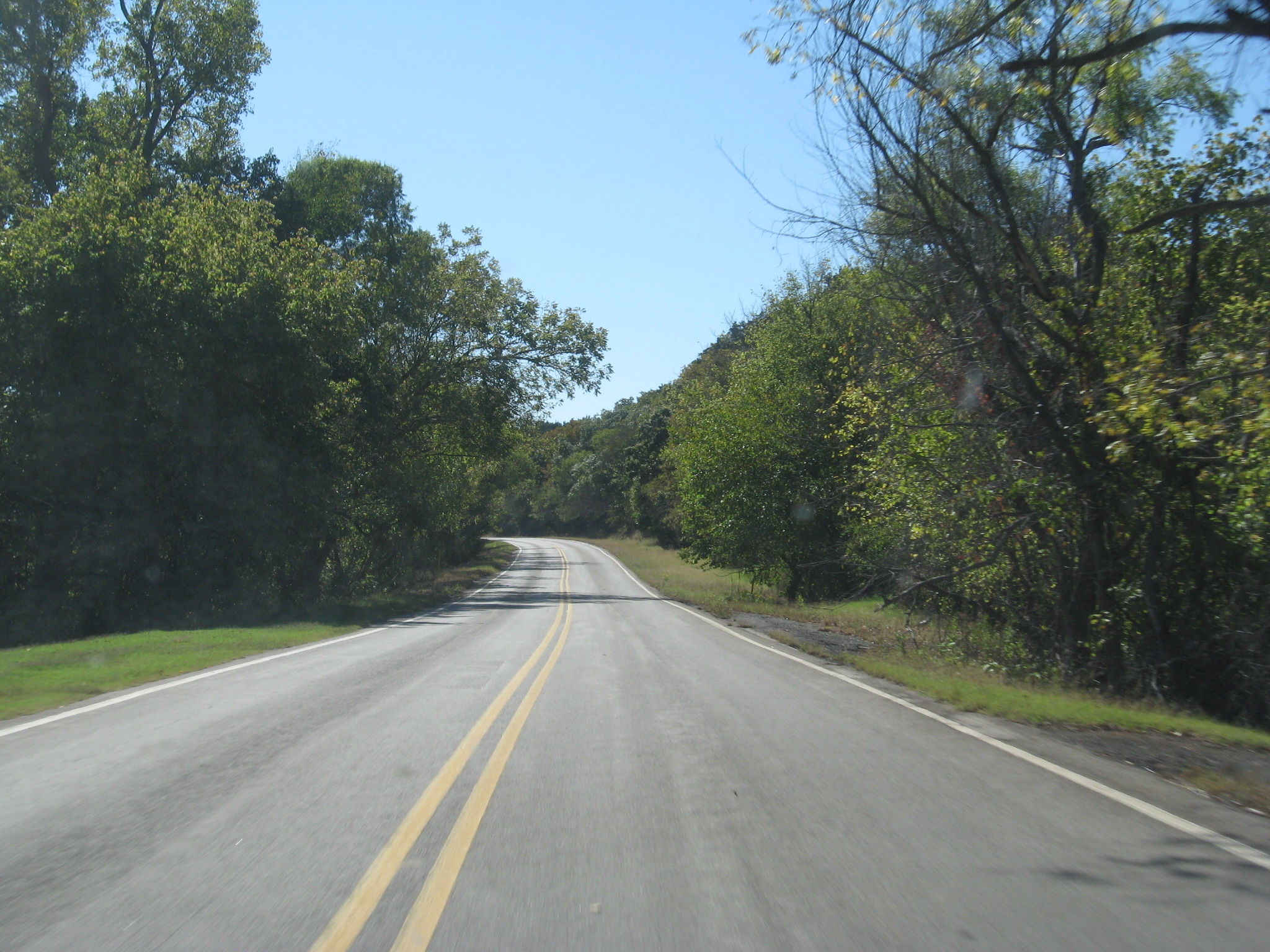
SH-152 in Caddo County

SH-152 begins at the Texas state line in Roger Mills County. It runs just north of the county line, crossing State Highway 30 and continues east until it meets SH-6's northern terminus, where it turns toward the southeast, entering Beckham County. It straightens out to head through Sayre running east–west where it meets both U.S. Route 283 and Interstate 40. Six miles later it crosses State Highway 34 and six miles (10 km) after that it meets SH-6 again.

SH-152 then crosses into Washita County and intersects State Highway 44 and 42. It then meets US 183 in a roundabout in Cordell. East of Cordell, it has a 7-mile (11 km) concurrency with the northern State Highway 54 and after it splits off, it intersects State Highway 115.

Right after entering Caddo County, it has a 2-mile (3.2 km) concurrency with State Highway 58, and then it meets State Highway 146 near Binger. At Binger, it begins to overlap U.S. Route 281 and SH-8. It splits off on its own again five miles (8 km) later. 9 miles (14 km) later, it meets the western State Highway 37 at Cogar which it then overlaps for 11 miles (18 km). (Located at this intersection is an abandoned Apco station which was used in a scene from the movie "Rain Man"). North of Minco, it meets US 81. At this T-intersection, SH-37 heads south and SH-152 heads north.

After crossing the Canadian River into Canadian County, SH-152 splits off from US 81 in Union City. In Mustang, it overlaps SH-4 for one mile between Mustang Road and Sara Road.

Upon crossing into Oklahoma County, SH-152 becomes a four-lane undivided expressway before heading northeast. It soon becomes a four-lane freeway before terminating at Interstate 344 (John Kilpatrick Turnpike) in Oklahoma City where it continues as Interstate 240.

== History ==

The first addition of any part of what is now SH-152 to the state highway system occurred between May 1, 1926 and November 1, 1927. Sometime between these dates, State Highway 41 was commissioned to run between US 66 in Sayre and SH-2 (now US 81) near Minco. SH-41 was extended east to Oklahoma City sometime between August 1933 and October 1935. SH-41's eastern terminus now fell at the intersection with US 62/277. The current western terminus was established between April 1938 and April 1939, when the highway was extended west from Sayre, through Sweetwater, to the Texas state line, where it connected to Texas's SH-152. On December 6, 1954, SH-41 in its entirety was renumbered to SH-152.

US 62 was moved to the Will Rogers Expressway (present day I-44 south of I-240) on September 4, 1963. SH-152 was extended over former US 62/277 to end at the intersection of S.W. 29th Street and May Avenue in Oklahoma City. At the time, this intersection carried SH-3 and SH-74. On March 5, 1979, the eastern terminus was pushed back a half-mile west, to the intersection of Interstate 44 and S.W. 29th.

On February 2, 2004, SH-152 was removed from Newcastle Boulevard and placed on the newly extended Airport Road freeway. The freeway previously carried no numbered route designation.

On August 2, 2021, the Oklahoma Transportation Commission approved an extension to the Interstate 240 designation to form a beltway around Oklahoma City. Starting in the existing eastern terminus, I-240 will run concurrent with I-40 to the Kickapoo Turnpike, then turn north and follow the Kickapoo Turnpike north to I-44 (the Turner Turnpike), then turn west along I-44 to the Kilpatrick Turnpike, following that road west and south to its current southern terminus at SH-152, then turning east along SH-152 and following that road east to I-44, which it will overlap until reaching the current western terminus of I-240. The designation must be approved by the American Association of State Highway and Transportation Officials (AASHTO) and the Federal Highway Administration (FHWA) to take effect.

In Fall 2023, the AASHTO approved an application from ODOT for an interstate designation on the Kickapoo Turnpike and the Kilpatrick Turnpike. However, the designations were assigned as I-335 and I-344 respectively; I-240 would not be extended along the turnpikes. In March 2024, the OTA announced that it would extend I-240 along Airport Road to the junction with the Kilpatrick Turnpike when the turnpike was designated as I-344. SH-152's eastern terminus will be truncated to the junction between the turnpike and I-240.

== SH-42 ==
State Highway 42
- Location: Dill City
- Length: 1.43 mi (2.30 km)
- Existed: July 20, 1939–present

State Highway 42 is a short state highway in Washita County. It is 1.43 miles (2.30 km) long and connects SH-152 to Dill City. SH-42 begins on the east edge of Dill City. It heads west along Orient Avenue through town, until it reaches Rambo Street. It then continues north on Rambo Street. The SH-42 designation then ends at SH-152. The SH-152 junction is SH-42's only intersection with another highway.

SH-42 was first added to the state highway system on July 20, 1939, at which time it had been graded, but not yet surfaced. At the time that SH-42 was commissioned, its northern terminus was at SH-41 which was later renumbered to SH-152. The highway first appeared on the 1944 state map.

Browse numbered routes
← I-40	OK	→ SH-43

== Junction list ==
County	Location	mi	km	Destinations	Notes
Roger Mills		0.00	0.00	SH 152 west	Continuation into Texas
Roger Mills	Sweetwater	5.1	8.2	SH-30	
Roger Mills		9.1	14.6	SH-6 south	Northern terminus of SH-6
Beckham	Sayre	25.4	40.9	I-40 BL / US 283 (Fourth Street)	
Beckham	Sayre	26.5	42.6	I-40 – Oklahoma City, Amarillo	I-40 exit 23
Beckham		33.0	53.1	SH-34	
Beckham		39.0	62.8	SH-6	
Washita		52.0	83.7	SH-44	
Washita	Dill City	54.0	86.9	SH-42 south	Northern terminus of SH-42
Washita	New Cordell	62.3	100.3	US 183 (Glenn English Street) – Clinton, Hobart	
Washita		69.9	112.5	SH-54 south	Western end of SH-54 concurrency
Washita		76.9	123.8	SH-54 north	Eastern end of SH-54 concurrency
Washita		77.9	125.4	SH-115 south	Northern terminus of SH-115
Caddo		83.9	135.0	SH-58 south	Western end of SH-58 concurrency
Caddo		85.8	138.1	SH-58 north	Eastern end of SH-58 concurrency
Caddo		94.7	152.4	SH-146 south	Northern terminus of SH-146
Caddo	Binger	99.0	159.3	US 281 / SH-8 north (Broadway)	Western end of US 281/SH-8 concurrency
Caddo		103.6	166.7	US 281 / SH-8 south	Eastern end of US 281/SH-8 concurrency
Caddo	Cogar	112.5	181.1	SH-37 north	Western end of SH-37 concurrency
Grady	Minco	123.2	198.3	US 81 / SH-37 south	Eastern end of SH-37 concurrency; southern end of US 81 concurrency
Canadian	Union City	127.5	205.2	US 81 (N. Main Street)	Northern end of US 81 concurrency
Canadian	Mustang	139.5	224.5	SH-4 north (Mustang Road)	Western end of SH-4 concurrency
Canadian	Mustang	140.5	226.1	SH-4 south (Sara Road)	Eastern end of SH-4 concurrency
Oklahoma	Oklahoma City	145.0	233.4	I-344 west / Kilpatrick Turnpike west – Yukon	Counterclockwise terminus of I-344; clockwise exit still under construction
Oklahoma	Oklahoma City	145.0	233.4	I-240 east	Continuation beyond eastern terminus
1.000 mi = 1.609 km; 1.000 km = 0.621 mi: Concurrency terminus; Route transition; Unopened
