= Oklahoma State Highway 49 =

State highway in Oklahoma, United States

State Highway 49
- SH-49 highlighted in red

Route information
- Maintained by ODOT
- Length: 30.0 mi (48.3 km)
- Existed: 1939–present

Major junctions
- West end: SH-54 south of Cooperton
- East end: I-44 / US 62 / US 277 / US 281 north of Lawton

Location
- Country: United States
- State: Oklahoma

Highway system
- Oklahoma State Highway System; Interstate; US; State; Turnpikes
| ← SH-48 | → SH-50 |

State Highway 49 (SH-49) is a 30-mile-long (48 km) state highway in the U.S. state of Oklahoma. It runs from SH-54 in Kiowa County to Interstate 44 (I-44) near Lawton. Part of the highway runs through the Wichita Mountains Wildlife Refuge; this portion of SH-49 carries no signage identifying it as such. It has no lettered spur routes.

SH-49 was established in 1939. Originally, it turned south in the refuge to serve Cache; its present-day routing was established in 1973.

== Route description ==
SH-49 begins in Kiowa County at SH-54 south of Cooperton and heads due east. The highway crosses into Comanche County about 2 miles (3.2 km) east of that point. The road continues east for about two miles more, where it makes a ninety-degree turn to the north. It continues north for around a half-mile (0.8 km), then angles northeast. It then enters the Wichita Mountains Wildlife Refuge.

Through the refuge, SH-49 is unsigned, appearing only as a nameless road. Inside the refuge, the speed limit drops to 45 miles per hour (72 km/h), with a night speed limit of 35 miles per hour (56 km/h).

Upon entering the refuge, the highway curves around to the southwest. SH-49 passes in between Big Four Mountain (elev. 2,233 feet (681 m)) and Sunset Peak. The road then drops down to Antelope Flat, where it crosses the stream that feeds Caddo Lake, as well as passing near the lake itself. It serves as the northern terminus of Indiahoma Road, which heads south towards French Lake, the trailhead of the Dog Run Hollow hiking trail, and many of the peaks in the southwest part of the refuge, before eventually serving the town of Indiahoma south of the refuge. After the Indiahoma Road intersection, it crosses the stream that forms French Lake. At the Boulder Turnoff, it intersects the road leading to Lost Lake and Eagle Mountain. The road then curves northeast to bypass Quanah Parker Lake and its campsite. The road then curves due south towards the Cache Wye.

At the Cache Wye, SH-49 intersects State Highway 115, which is also unsigned. Motorists on eastbound SH-49 that continue straight at the junction will be put on southbound SH-115; to continue east, a left turn must be made. SH-49 and SH-115 are effectively concurrent east of the Cache Wye, although signage is still not posted. The two highways turn northeast, then curve back around to the east. SH-115 then splits off to the north, while SH-49 continues a general eastbound heading.

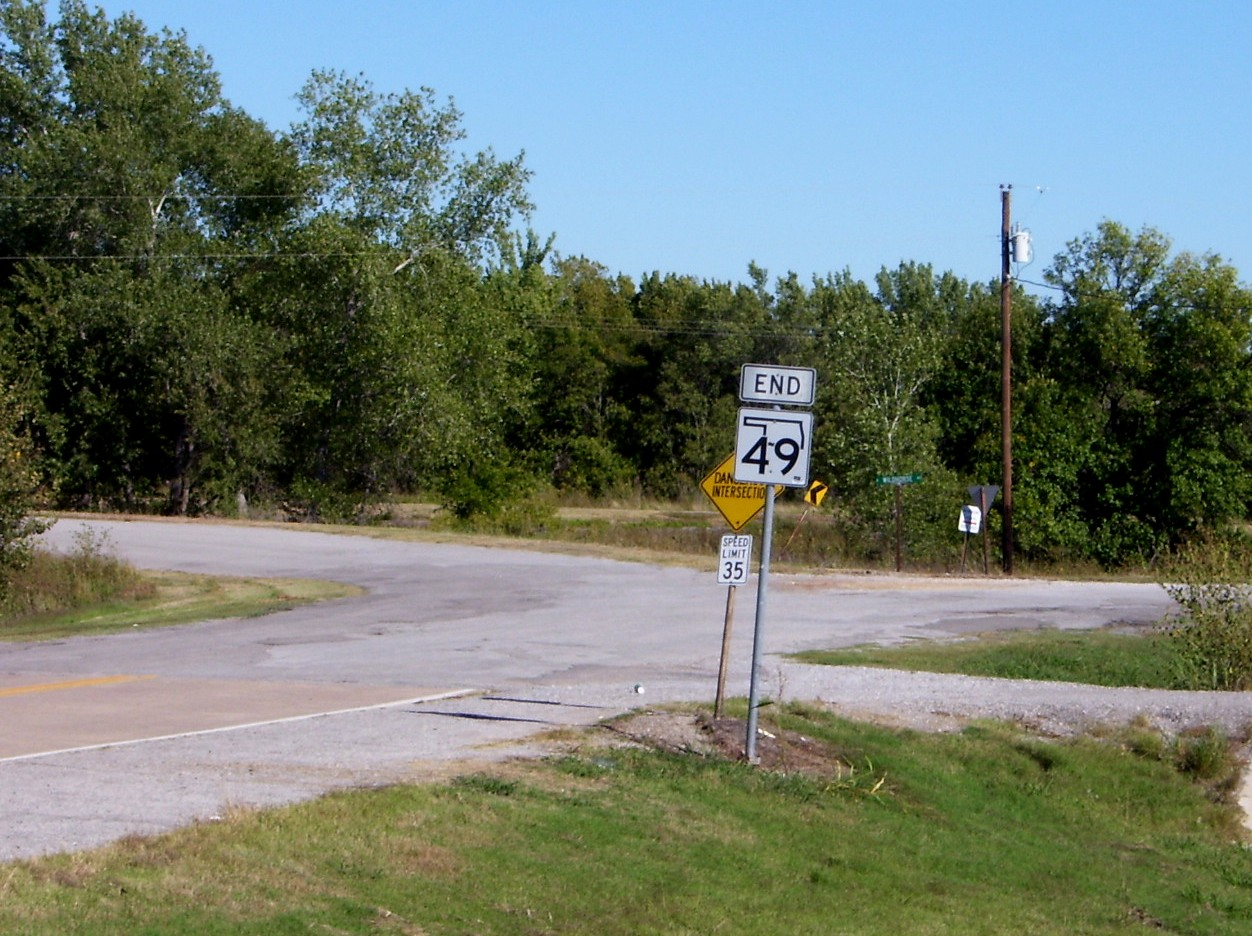
SH-49 end signage is posted just east of I-44.

SH-49 continues through the eastern part of the refuge. It serves as the primary access to Mount Scott, with an access road connecting the highway to the mountain's summit. SH-49 then passes between Elmer Thomas Lake and Lake Lawtonka before exiting the refuge. At this entrance to the park, there is an "end SH-49" assembly posted on westbound SH-49. This is an error, as SH-49 exits the other side of the park, and ODOT does not list two different SH-49s.

After leaving the refuge, SH-49 passes through the south side of Medicine Park. Running south of Mount Cummins, it meets the southern terminus of State Highway 58. Four miles (6.4 km) later, it ends at I-44 exit 45.

== History ==
SH-49 was added to the state highway system in 1939. At this time, SH-49 began at US-62 in Cache (now designated Old Cache Road; US-62 had not yet been shifted to the freeway north of town), and entered the Wichita Mountains National Wildlife Refuge, following present-day SH-115 until the Cache Wye. SH-49 then emerged from the refuge near Medicine Park and followed the remainder of its present-day routing.

The portion of highway between the Cache Wye and Cache itself was renumbered to become part of SH-115 in 1962. The same year, the portion of road leading west from the Cache Wye to SH-54 was added to the highway, bringing it to its present-day extent. At this time, the road between SH-54 and the Cache Wye was gravel. It was paved in 1973.

== Junction list ==
| County | Location | mi | km | Destinations | Notes |
|---|---|---|---|---|---|
| Kiowa | | 0.0 | 0.0 | SH-54 | Western terminus |
| Comanche | Wichita Mtns. NWR | 15.2 | 24.5 | SH-115 | SH-115 joins eastbound and splits westbound |
| Comanche | Wichita Mtns. NWR | 18.5 | 29.8 | SH-115 | SH-115 joins westbound and splits eastbound |
| Comanche | Medicine Park | 26.0 | 41.8 | SH-58 | Southern terminus of SH-58 |
| Comanche | | 30.0 | 48.3 | I-44 | Eastern terminus, I-44 exit 45 |
1.000 mi = 1.609 km; 1.000 km = 0.621 mi: Concurrency terminus
