= Oklahoma State Highway 19 =

State highway in Oklahoma, United States

State Highway 19

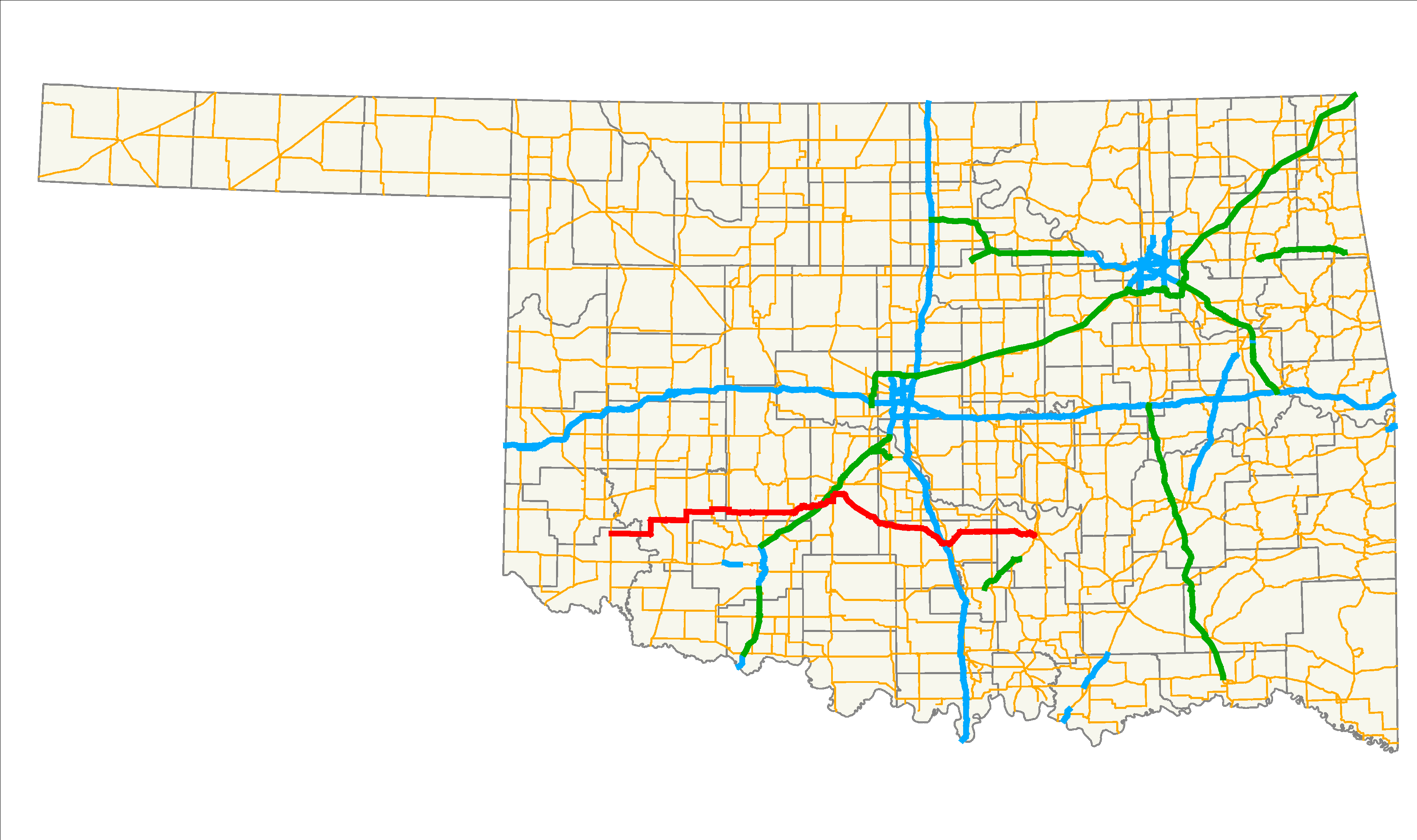

Route information
- Maintained by ODOT
- Length: 171.7 mi (276.3 km)

Major junctions
- West end: US 283 / SH-6 in Blair
- US 183 in Roosevelt; US 62 / US 281 in Apache; US 81 in Ninnekah; I-35 in Pauls Valley; US 77 in Pauls Valley; US 177 in Stratford
- East end: US 377 / SH-1 / SH-3 / SH-3E / SH-3W / SH-99 west of Ada

Location
- Country: United States
- State: Oklahoma

Highway system
- Oklahoma State Highway System; Interstate; US; State; Turnpikes
← SH-18	→ SH-20

State Highway 19, abbreviated as SH-19, is a 171.7-mile-long (276.3 km) highway running through the southern part of the U.S. state of Oklahoma. It is signed east–west.

== Route description ==
SH-19 westbound at SH-76. This sign is unusual because the arrows are normally placed under the highway shields.

SH-19 begins at an intersection with US-283 in Blair, Oklahoma. SH-19 heads east from Blair for 23 miles (37 km) without intersecting another highway before meeting U.S. Highway 183 north of Roosevelt. It continues eastward, sharing a 3-mile (4.8 km) section of road with State Highway 54 before splitting off to the east and briefly overlapping with SH-115 and State Highway 58.

The next town Highway 19 encounters is Apache, north of Lake Ellsworth, where it crosses U.S. Highway 62/281. Nine miles (14½ km) later, it overlaps with U.S. Highway 277 at Cyril. These two overlap with US-81 near Ninnekah, but SH-19 splits off to the east once again within 3 miles (4.8 km).

After splitting off, SH-19 travels in a southeast direction to have a brief concurrency with State Highway 76 through Lindsay. Ten miles (16 km) later it intersects with State Highway 74 at a four-way stop in Maysville. Still continuing southeast, 10 miles (16 km) later it has an interchange with Interstate 35 and an intersection with U.S. Highway 77 in Pauls Valley.

After passing through the Pauls Valley area, SH-19 crosses U.S. Highway 177 west of Stratford, Oklahoma. It then ends, concurrent with SH-3W at the Richardson Loop outside of Ada.

== Spurs ==
SH-19 has two lettered spurs.

- SH-19C runs for one mile (1.6 km) from SH-19 to Alex. It was commissioned on August 7, 1950.
- SH-19D runs for one mile (1.6 km) from SH-19 to Bradley.

== Junction list ==
County	Location	mi	km	Destinations	Notes
Jackson	Blair	0.0	0.0	US 283 / SH-6	Western terminus
Kiowa	Roosevelt	22.6	36.4	US 183	
Kiowa	Cooperton	31.4	50.5	SH-54	Southern end of SH-54 concurrency
Kiowa		34.4	55.4	SH-54	Northern end of SH-54 concurrency
Kiowa		43.4	69.8	SH-115	Western end of SH-115 concurrency
Kiowa		44.4	71.5	SH-115	Eastern end of SH-115 concurrency
Caddo		50.4	81.1	SH-58	Western end of SH-58 concurrency
Caddo		54.3	87.4	SH-58	Eastern end of SH-58 concurrency
Caddo	Apache	64.8	104.3	US 62 / US 281	Western end of US-62/US-281 concurrency
Caddo	Apache	65.4	105.3	US 62 / US 281	Eastern end of US-62/US-281 concurrency
Caddo	Cyril	74.2	119.4	US 277	Western end of US-277 concurrency
Caddo	Cyril	75.1	120.9	SH-8	Southern terminus of SH-8
Grady	Ninnekah	90.3	145.3	US 81	Southern end of US-81 concurrency
Grady	Ninnekah	93.2	150.0	US 81 / US 277	Northern end of US-81 concurrency, eastern end of US-277 concurrency
Grady	Alex	104.5	168.2	SH-19C	Southern terminus of SH-19C
Grady	Bradley	109.1	175.6	SH-19D	Southern terminus of SH-19D
Garvin	Lindsay	115.4	185.7	SH-76	Western end of SH-76 concurrency
Garvin	Lindsay	116.4	187.3	SH-76	Eastern end of SH-76 concurrency
Garvin		117.4	188.9	SH-59B	Southern terminus of SH-59B
Garvin	Maysville	127.5	205.2	SH-74	
Garvin	Pauls Valley	137.5	221.3	I-35	I-35 exit 72
Garvin	Pauls Valley	139.9	225.1	US 77	Western end of US-77 concurrency
Garvin	Pauls Valley	140.1	225.5	US 77	Eastern end of US-77 concurrency
Garvin		147.2	236.9	SH-133	Southern terminus of SH-133
Garvin	Stratford	156.2	251.4	US 177	
Pontotoc		170.3	274.1	SH-3W	Western end of SH-3W concurrency
Pontotoc	Ada	171.7	276.3	US 377 / SH-1 / SH-3 / SH-3E / SH-99	Eastern terminus; SH-3W merges with SH-3E to become SH-3
1.000 mi = 1.609 km; 1.000 km = 0.621 mi: Concurrency terminus
