= Oklahoma State Highway 55 =

State highway in Oklahoma, United States

State Highway 55

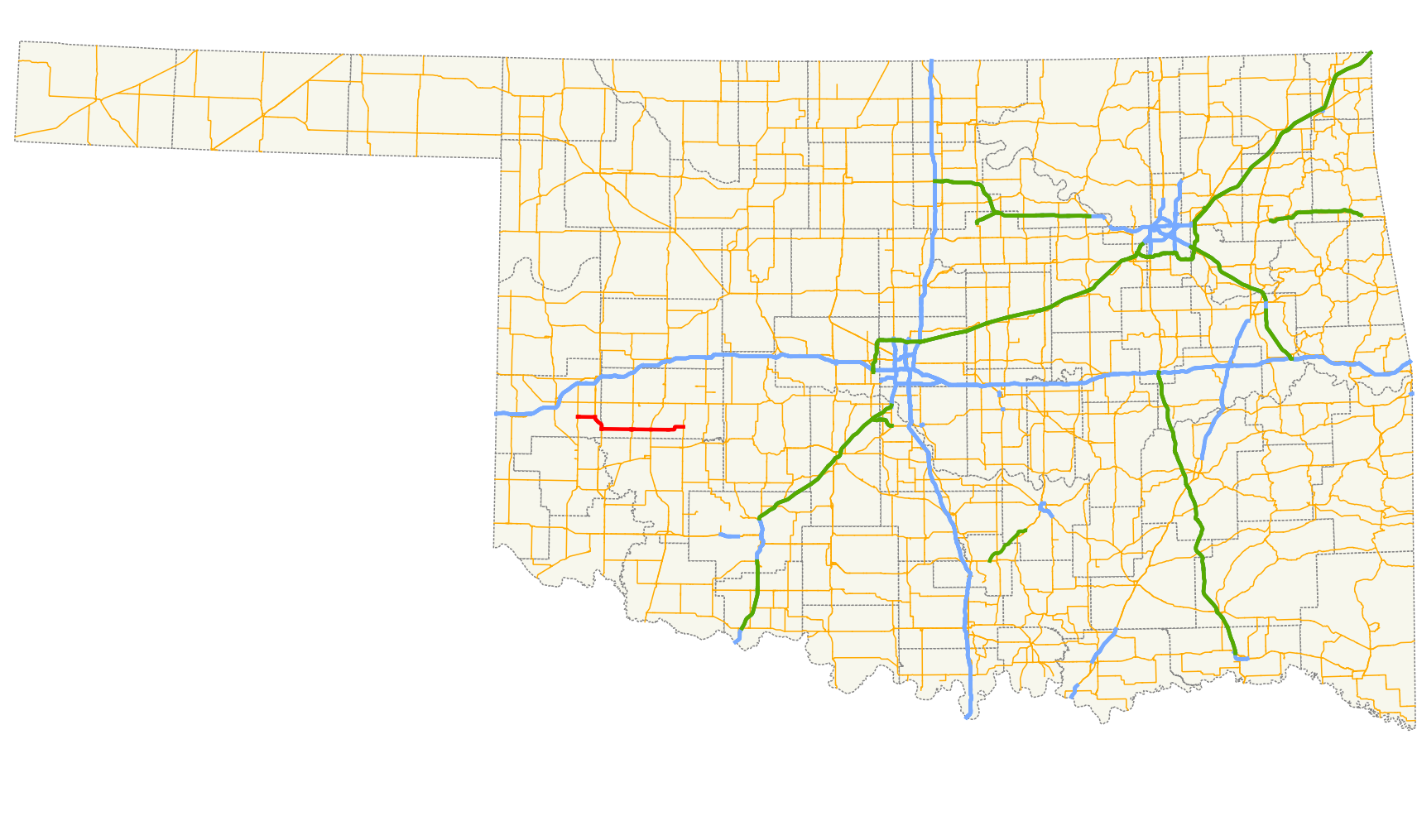

Route information
- Maintained by ODOT
- Length: 39.9 mi (64.2 km)

Major junctions
- West end: SH-34 in Carter
- US 183 in Rocky
- East end: SH-54 in Lake Valley

Location
- Country: United States
- State: Oklahoma

Highway system
- Oklahoma State Highway System; Interstate; US; State; Turnpikes
← SH-54	→ US 56

State Highway 55 is a state highway in western Oklahoma. It runs for 39.9 miles (64.2 km) from Carter, Oklahoma to the unincorporated community of Lake Valley. It has no lettered spur routes.

== Route description ==
SH-55 begins at State Highway 34 in Carter, in eastern Beckham Co. It heads east for six miles (10 km), where it meets State Highway 6 and overlaps it to the south. After running along the Beckham/Washita Co. line, it splits off to the east near Retrop. It then meets State Highway 44 in Sentinel. Seven miles later it meets US-183 in Rocky. It then terminates at State Highway 54 in Lake Valley.

== Junction list ==
County	Location	mi	km	Destinations	Notes
Beckham	Carter	0.0	0.0	SH-34	Western terminus
Beckham		5.9	9.5	SH-6	Northern end of SH-6 concurrency
Beckham–Washita county line	Retrop	10.9	17.5	SH-6	Southern end of SH-6 concurrency
Washita	Sentinel	21.4	34.4	SH-44	Southern end of SH-44 concurrency
Washita	Sentinel	21.5	34.6	SH-44	Northern end of SH-44 concurrency
Washita	Rocky	28.0	45.1	US 183	
Washita	Lake Valley	39.9	64.2	SH-54	
1.000 mi = 1.609 km; 1.000 km = 0.621 mi: Concurrency terminus
