= Hollister, Oklahoma =

- Town
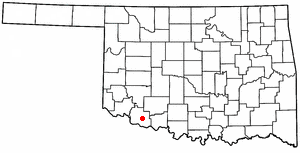
- Location of Hollister, Oklahoma
- Coordinates: 34°20′27″N 98°52′16″W
- Country: United States
- State: Oklahoma
- County: Tillman

Area
  - Total: 0.27 sq mi (0.69 km^{2})
  - Land: 0.27 sq mi (0.69 km^{2})
  - Water: 0 sq mi (0.00 km^{2})
- Elevation: 1,122 ft (342 m)

Population (2020)
  - Total: 35
  - Density: 130.7/sq mi (50.46/km^{2})
- Time zone: UTC-6 (Central (CST))
  - Summer (DST): UTC-5 (CDT)
- ZIP code: 73551
- Area code: 580
- FIPS code: 40-35550
- GNIS feature ID: 2412763

Hollister is a town in Tillman County, Oklahoma, United States. The population was 35 as of the 2020 United States census. The town is located about 12 driving miles east-southeast of the county seat of Frederick, and is located along Oklahoma State Highway 54.

== History ==
The Wichita Falls and Northwestern Railway (later the Missouri, Kansas and Texas Railway) founded Hollister in 1907 as a depot on its line from Wichita Falls, Texas to Frederick, Oklahoma. Hollister was built between the towns of Isadore and Parton. Many of its buildings were moved from Parton. Originally, this was the location of a railroad switch known as "Happy Jack," "Happy Spur," or just "Happy." The first station was a boxcar, and the first train arrived on November 16, 1907. The town was named for Harry L. Hollister, the depot agent in Frederick. A post office was established on February 1, 1909.

Hollister's population peaked at 200 in 1940, then began a fairly steady decline. The high school closed in 1963 and the grade school in 1968. At the turn of the 21st Century, Hollister had a post office, a Baptist church and two grain elevators.

== Geography ==
According to the United States Census Bureau, the town has a total area of 0.2 square miles (0.52 km^{2}), all land.

=== Climate ===
Climate data for Hollister, Oklahoma
Month	Jan	Feb	Mar	Apr	May	Jun	Jul	Aug	Sep	Oct	Nov	Dec	Year
Mean daily maximum °F (°C)	50.6 (10.3)	56.3 (13.5)	65.7 (18.7)	75.9 (24.4)	83.5 (28.6)	91.9 (33.3)	97.7 (36.5)	96.4 (35.8)	87.1 (30.6)	76.8 (24.9)	63.5 (17.5)	52.8 (11.6)	74.9 (23.8)
Mean daily minimum °F (°C)	24.6 (−4.1)	28.8 (−1.8)	37.4 (3.0)	48.7 (9.3)	57.0 (13.9)	66.4 (19.1)	71.0 (21.7)	69.5 (20.8)	61.9 (16.6)	49.8 (9.9)	37.9 (3.3)	27.9 (−2.3)	48.4 (9.1)
Average precipitation inches (mm)	0.9 (23)	1.3 (33)	2.1 (53)	2.3 (58)	4.3 (110)	3.5 (89)	2.1 (53)	2.7 (69)	3.6 (91)	2.7 (69)	1.6 (41)	1.0 (25)	28.1 (714)
Source 1: weather.com
Source 2: Weatherbase.com

== Demographics ==
Historical population
Census	Pop.	Note	%±
1930	198		—
1940	200		1.0%
1950	172		−14.0%
1960	166		−3.5%
1970	105		−36.7%
1980	82		−21.9%
1990	59		−28.0%
2000	60		1.7%
2010	50		−16.7%
2020	35		−30.0%
U.S. Decennial Census

=== 2020 census ===
As of the 2020 census, Hollister had a population of 35. The median age was 41.9 years. 5.7% of residents were under the age of 18 and 25.7% of residents were 65 years of age or older. For every 100 females there were 118.8 males, and for every 100 females age 18 and over there were 106.2 males age 18 and over.

0.0% of residents lived in urban areas, while 100.0% lived in rural areas.

There were 16 households in Hollister, of which 31.3% had children under the age of 18 living in them. Of all households, 56.3% were married-couple households, 18.8% were households with a male householder and no spouse or partner present, and 12.5% were households with a female householder and no spouse or partner present. About 6.3% of all households were made up of individuals and 6.3% had someone living alone who was 65 years of age or older.

There were 19 housing units, of which 15.8% were vacant. The homeowner vacancy rate was 0.0% and the rental vacancy rate was 33.3%.

Racial composition as of the 2020 census
Race	Number	Percent
White	30	85.7%
Black or African American	1	2.9%
American Indian and Alaska Native	1	2.9%
Asian	0	0.0%
Native Hawaiian and Other Pacific Islander	0	0.0%
Some other race	0	0.0%
Two or more races	3	8.6%
Hispanic or Latino (of any race)	2	5.7%

=== 2000 census ===
As of the census of 2000, there were 60 people, 20 households, and 17 families residing in the town. The population density was 245.2 inhabitants per square mile (94.7/km^{2}). There were 25 housing units at an average density of 102.2 per square mile (39.5/km^{2}). The racial makeup of the town was 86.67% White, 10.00% from other races, and 3.33% from two or more races. Hispanic or Latino of any race were 10.00% of the population.

There were 20 households, out of which 30.0% had children under the age of 18 living with them, 75.0% were married couples living together, and 15.0% were non-families. 15.0% of all households were made up of individuals, and none had someone living alone who was 65 years of age or older. The average household size was 3.00 and the average family size was 3.29.

In the town, the population was spread out, with 28.3% under the age of 18, 1.7% from 18 to 24, 31.7% from 25 to 44, 28.3% from 45 to 64, and 10.0% who were 65 years of age or older. The median age was 37 years. For every 100 females, there were 140.0 males. For every 100 females age 18 and over, there were 138.9 males.

The median income for a household in the town was $21,250, and the median income for a family was $26,250. Males had a median income of $18,750 versus $21,250 for females. The per capita income for the town was $7,888. There were 26.7% of families and 39.3% of the population living below the poverty line, including 39.1% of under eighteens and none of those over 64.
