= Oklahoma State Highway 6 =

Highway in Oklahoma

State Highway 6
- OK 6 mainline in red

Route information
- Maintained by ODOT
- Length: 121.8 mi (196.0 km)
- Existed: August 21, 1954; 71 years ago–present

Major junctions
- South end: SH 6 at the Texas state line near Eldorado
- US 62 / US 283 at Altus; I-40 / SH-34 at Elk City
- North end: SH-152 near Sweetwater

Location
- Country: United States
- State: Oklahoma

Highway system
- Oklahoma State Highway System; Interstate; US; State; Turnpikes
← SH-5	→ SH-7

State Highway 6, abbreviated SH-6 or OK-6, is a state highway in Oklahoma. It runs in a 121.8 miles (196.0 km) crescent through the southwestern part of the state, running from the Texas state line north of Quanah, Texas, to SH-152 in the town of Sweetwater.

SH-6 was added to the state highway system in 1954. The highway was later extended from its original extent; westward from Elk City in 1957 and southward to Texas in 1975.

== Route description ==
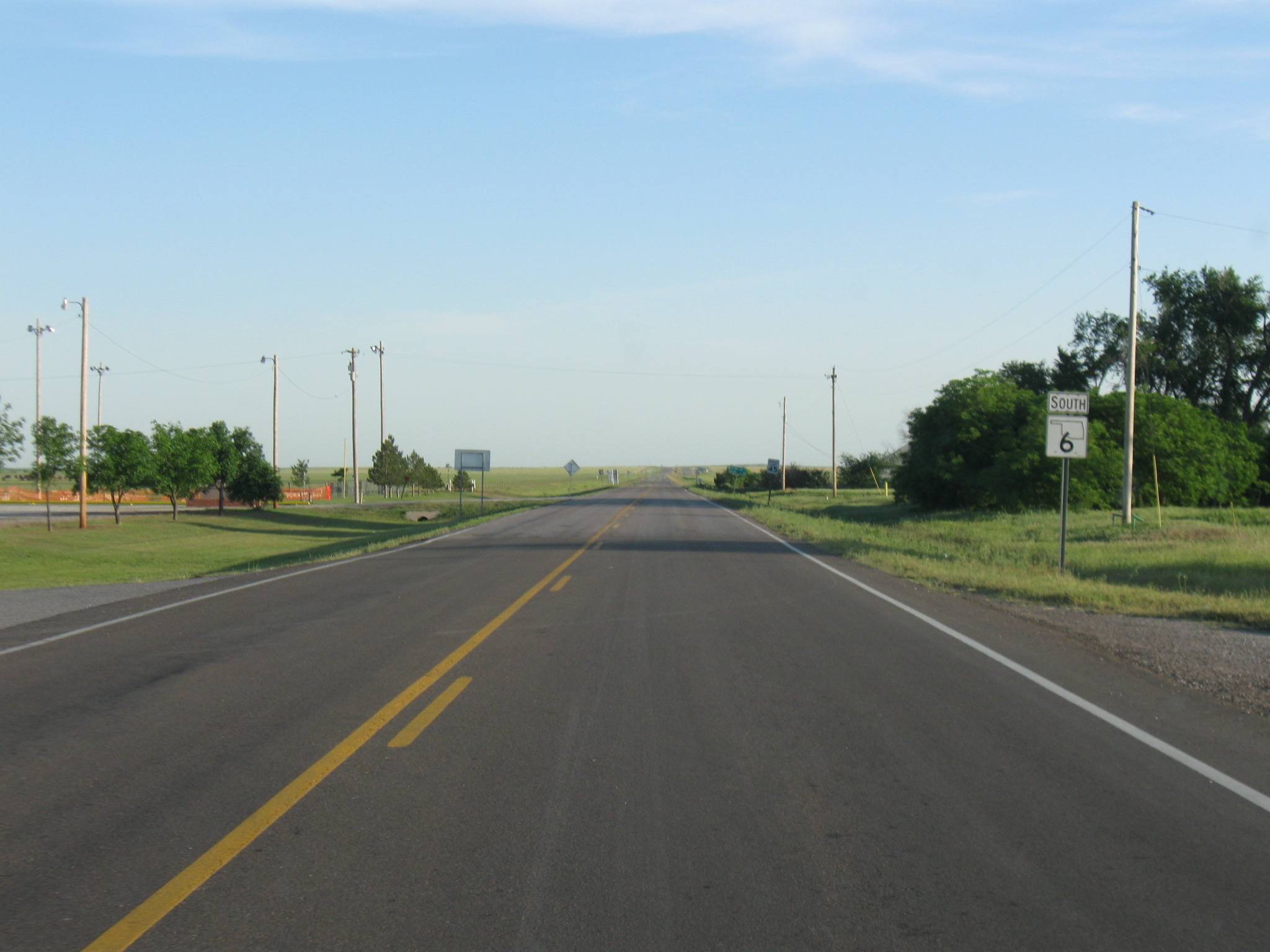
SH-6 south of Granite

After crossing the Red River, State Highway 6 leaves Texas, becomes SH-6 and continues headed northeast, passing through the small Jackson County towns of Eldorado and Olustee. Highway 6 meets US-62 five miles (8 km) west of Altus. SH-6 makes a right turn at this point to overlap US-62 into Altus.

In Altus, SH-6 takes a turn to the north to overlap US-283. North of Blair, US-283 heads due north while SH-6 turns toward the northwest. SH-6 crosses US-283 once more before the state highway continues to the north toward Granite, where it meets SH-9.

North of Granite, SH-6 runs along the Beckham–Washita county line until sharing a 4-mile (6.4 km) concurrency with SH-55, moving into Beckham County. After splitting away from SH-55, it meets SH-152 for the first time (it will meet SH-152 at its northern end.)

SH-6 continues north to have an interchange with Interstate 40 in Elk City. It overlaps Business Loop I-40 for four miles (6.4 km) on the north side of the city. At this point the north–south highway curves to the west. It crosses US-283 (again), and then ends at SH-152 in Sweetwater.

== History ==
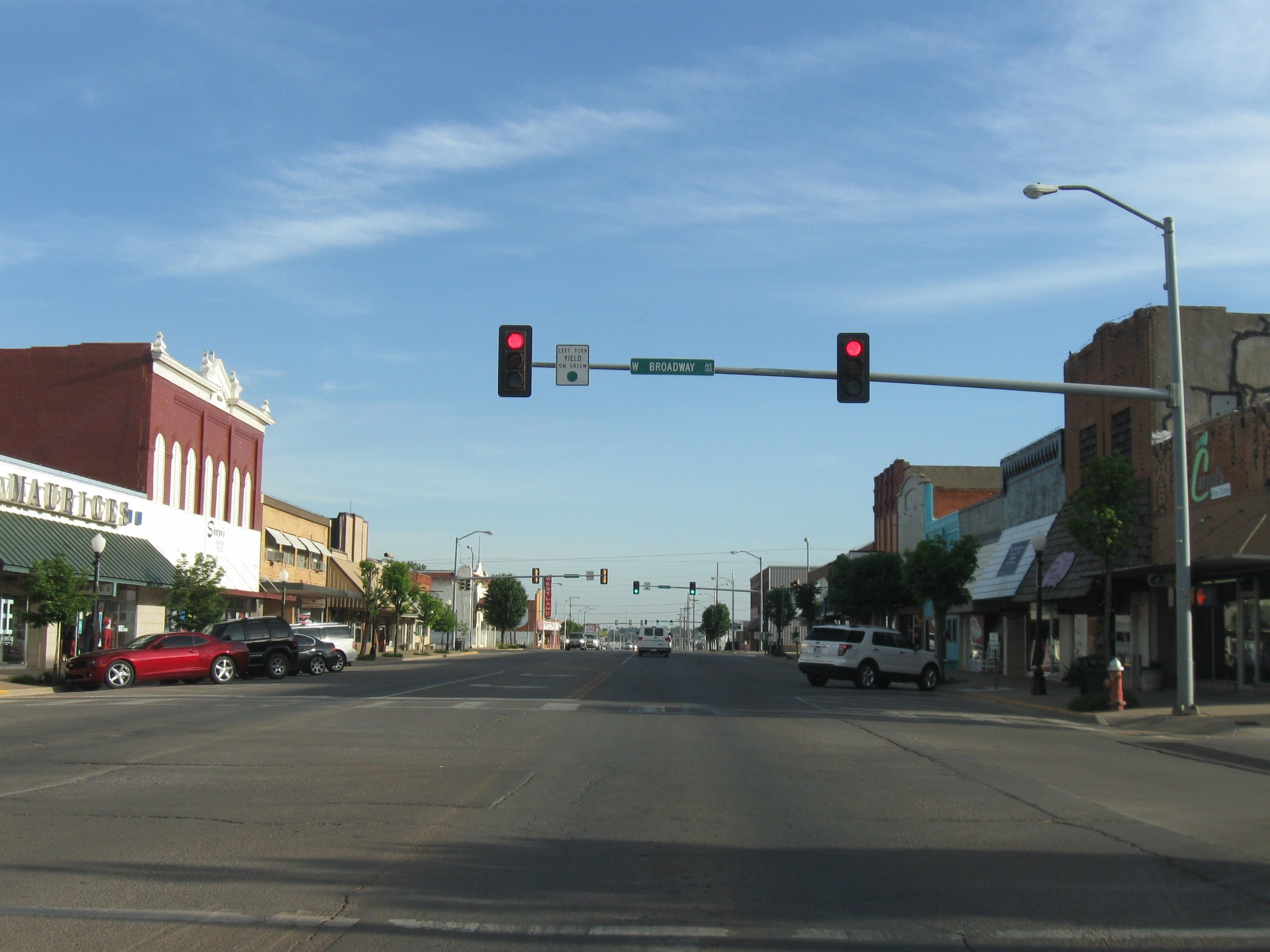
SH-6 in downtown Elk City

The original State Highway 6 extended from the Texas state line near Colbert to the Kansas state line north of Vinita. When the United States Numbered Highways system was established in 1926, the vast majority of the highway was overlapped by US-75 and US-73. (Later, this corridor would form the majority of US-69 in Oklahoma). As a result, the original SH-6 designation was decommissioned soon after the establishment of the U.S. highway system.

The SH-6 designation remained unused until August 21, 1954, when it was assigned to a highway beginning at US-283 east of Mangum, extending north through Granite and Retrop, and ending at US-66 in Elk City. The highway was extended west along SH-73 to its current northern terminus on January 21, 1957.

SH-6 was extended to the south on July 7, 1975, bringing it to Altus by way of a concurrency with US-283, where it joined US-62 in another concurrency, headed west. West of Altus, the route split off and headed southwest to the Texas state line. In addition to the U.S. routes, SH-6 was concurrent with SH-44 between that route's current southern terminus and Eldorado, where it ended; thereafter, SH-6 followed SH-34 to the Red River. To remove the redundant designations, both SH-34 and SH-44 were truncated to their current southern terminus on January 5, 1987.

SH-6 was realigned twice in 2004 to allow SH-6 a straighter route in situations where it was concurrent with another highway. The first such section removed a portion of the US-283 concurrency between Blair and Granite; the second realignment took place on the SH-55 concurrency north of Retrop. Both of these changes were applied to the highway on February 2, 2004. No further changes to the highway's route have taken place since then.

== Junction list ==
County	Location	mi	km	Destinations	Notes
Jackson	Red River	0.00	0.00	SH 6 south (Texas Korean War Veterans Memorial Highway)	Continuation into Texas
Jackson	Eldorado	6.2	10.0	SH-5	Southern terminus of SH-5
Jackson		12.5	20.1	SH-34	Southern terminus of SH-34
Jackson		27.4	44.1	US 62 west	Southern end of US-62 concurrency
Jackson	Altus	32.3	52.0	US 62 east (Broadway Street east) / US 283 south (Main Street south)	Northern end of US-62 concurrency; southern end of US-283 concurrency
Jackson	Blair	42.4	68.2	SH-19	Western terminus of SH-19
Greer		44.5	71.6	To SH-44 north / Great Plains Trail of Oklahoma – Hobart	
Greer		48.5	78.1	US 283 north (Great Plains Trail of Oklahoma) to SH-44	Northern end of US-283 concurrency
Greer	Granite	63.4	102.0	SH-9	
Kiowa	No major junctions				
Washita–Beckham county line	Retrop	78.3	126.0	SH-55 east	Southern end of SH-55 concurrency
Beckham		83.3	134.1	SH-55 west	Northern end of SH-55 concurrency
Beckham		88.3	142.1	SH-152	
Beckham	Elk City	95.1	153.0	I-40 / SH-34 – Amarillo, Oklahoma City	I-40 exit 38
Beckham	Elk City	96.7	155.6	I-40 BL east (3rd Street east)	Eastern end of I-40 Bus. concurrency; former US 66 east
Beckham	Elk City	100.5	161.7	I-40 BL west (State Highway 66)	Western end of I-40 Bus. concurrency; former US 66 west
Beckham		110.9	178.5	US 283	
Beckham–Roger Mills county line		121.8	196.0	SH-152 – Wheeler, Sayre	Northern terminus; road continues west as SH-152 (1100 Road)
1.000 mi = 1.609 km; 1.000 km = 0.621 mi: Concurrency terminus
