= Dill City, Oklahoma =

- Town
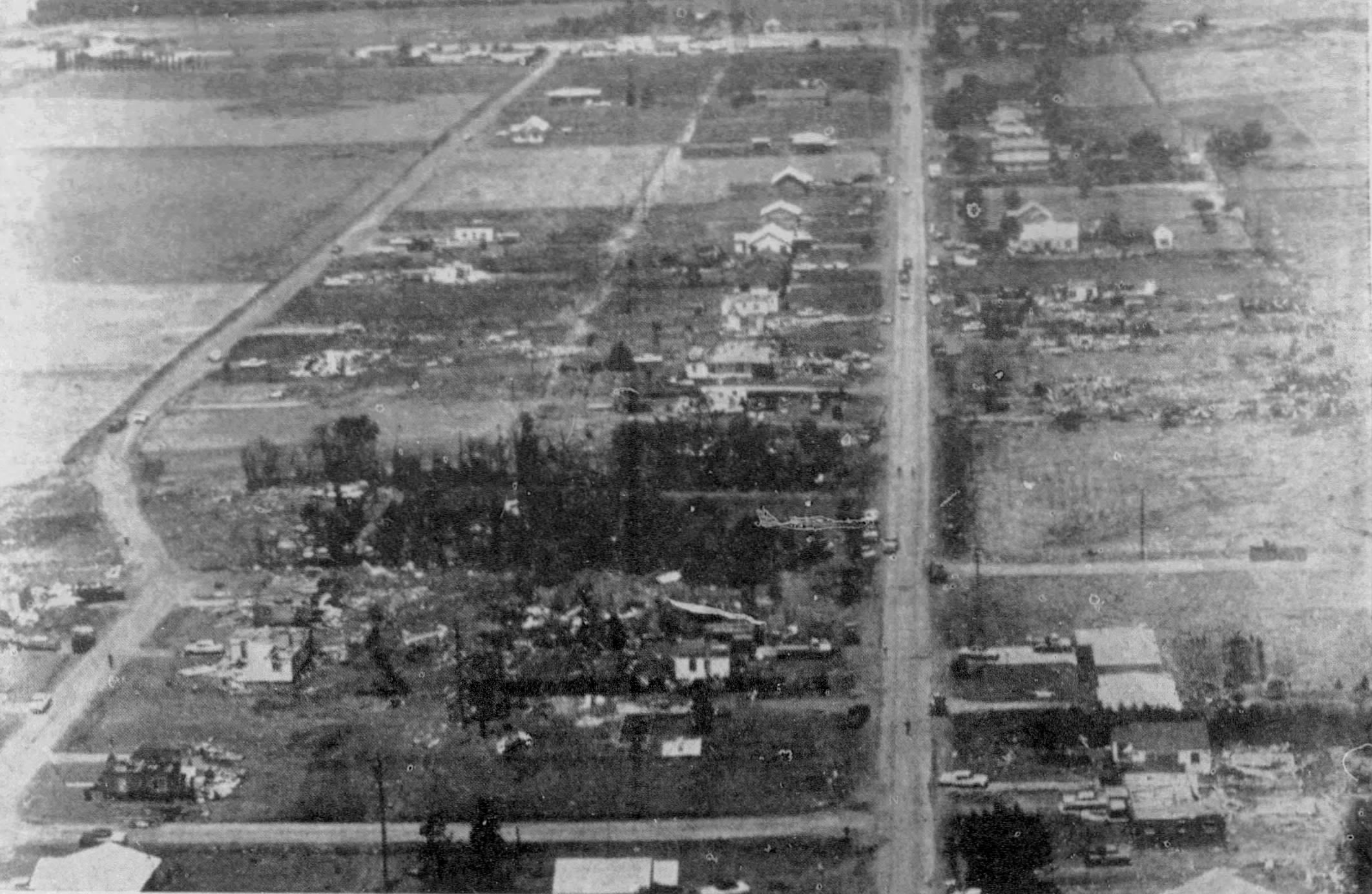
- Aerial of Dill City after 1962 tornado

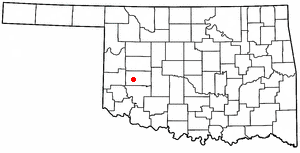
- Location of Dill City, Oklahoma
- Coordinates: 35°16′55″N 99°08′01″W
- Country: United States
- State: Oklahoma
- County: Washita

Area
  - Total: 0.58 sq mi (1.50 km^{2})
  - Land: 0.58 sq mi (1.50 km^{2})
  - Water: 0 sq mi (0.00 km^{2})
- Elevation: 1,864 ft (568 m)

Population (2020)
  - Total: 420
  - Density: 727.1/sq mi (280.74/km^{2})
- Time zone: UTC-6 (Central (CST))
  - Summer (DST): UTC-5 (CDT)
- ZIP code: 73641
- Area code: 580
- FIPS code: 40-20850
- GNIS feature ID: 2412430

Dill City is a town in Washita County, Oklahoma, United States. As of the 2020 census, Dill City had a population of 420.

== Geography ==
According to the United States Census Bureau, the town has a total area of 0.6 square miles (1.6 km^{2}), all land.

Dill City is served by State Highway 42, a dedicated spur-like state highway connecting the community to State Highway 152.

== Demographics ==
Historical population
Census	Pop.	Note	%±
1910	240		—
1920	345		43.8%
1930	511		48.1%
1940	511		0.0%
1950	453		−11.4%
1960	623		37.5%
1970	578		−7.2%
1980	649		12.3%
1990	628		−3.2%
2000	526		−16.2%
2010	562		6.8%
2020	420		−25.3%
U.S. Decennial Census

=== 2020 census ===
As of the 2020 census, Dill City had a population of 420. The median age was 50.3 years. 21.7% of residents were under the age of 18 and 22.1% of residents were 65 years of age or older. For every 100 females there were 96.3 males, and for every 100 females age 18 and over there were 100.6 males age 18 and over.

0.0% of residents lived in urban areas, while 100.0% lived in rural areas.

There were 186 households in Dill City, of which 22.6% had children under the age of 18 living in them. Of all households, 39.2% were married-couple households, 26.9% were households with a male householder and no spouse or partner present, and 29.6% were households with a female householder and no spouse or partner present. About 40.3% of all households were made up of individuals and 17.2% had someone living alone who was 65 years of age or older.

There were 233 housing units, of which 20.2% were vacant. The homeowner vacancy rate was 3.2% and the rental vacancy rate was 2.6%.

Racial composition as of the 2020 census
Race	Number	Percent
White	352	83.8%
Black or African American	5	1.2%
American Indian and Alaska Native	5	1.2%
Asian	0	0.0%
Native Hawaiian and Other Pacific Islander	0	0.0%
Some other race	13	3.1%
Two or more races	45	10.7%
Hispanic or Latino (of any race)	52	12.4%

=== 2000 census ===
As of the 2000 census there were 526 people, 209 households, and 161 families residing in the town. The population density was 949.7 inhabitants per square mile (366.7/km^{2}). There were 253 housing units at an average density of 456.8 per square mile (176.4/km^{2}). The racial makeup of the town was 91.83% White, 4.37% Native American, 0.57% from other races, and 3.23% from two or more races. Hispanic or Latino of any race were 4.37% of the population.

There were 209 households, out of which 31.6% had children under the age of 18 living with them, 63.2% were married couples living together, 10.0% had a female householder with no husband present, and 22.5% were non-families. 21.5% of all households were made up of individuals, and 12.0% had someone living alone who was 65 years of age or older. The average household size was 2.52 and the average family size was 2.91.

In the town, the population was spread out, with 25.5% under the age of 18, 7.4% from 18 to 24, 24.7% from 25 to 44, 18.3% from 45 to 64, and 24.1% who were 65 years of age or older. The median age was 40 years. For every 100 females, there were 97.7 males. For every 100 females age 18 and over, there were 95.0 males.

The median income for a household in the town was $22,917, and the median income for a family was $26,500. Males had a median income of $23,125 versus $14,545 for females. The per capita income for the town was $11,558. About 17.1% of families and 21.1% of the population were below the poverty line, including 30.6% of those under age 18 and 9.7% of those age 65 or over.

== Notable person ==
- Lester Levern Merrifield
