= Albert, Oklahoma =

Unincorporated community in Oklahoma, US

- Unincorporated community
- Location within the state of Oklahoma Albert (the United States)
- Coordinates: 35°13′58″N 98°24′41″W
- Country: United States
- State: Oklahoma
- County: Caddo
- Elevation: 1,519 ft (463 m)

Population (2000)
  - Total: 0
- Time zone: UTC-6 (Central (CST))
  - Summer (DST): UTC-5 (CDT)
- ZIP codes: 73001
- Area code: 405
- GNIS feature ID: 1089566

Albert is an unincorporated place in Caddo County, Oklahoma, United States. It is located approximately six miles southwest of Binger on State Highway 146.

The post office was established September 1, 1910. The community is said to have been named for a friend of the townsite owner, Martin F. Hennessey, Albert Baker. The town is locally known as Oney with only the post office referred to as Albert. Oney was original name after Richard Oney by Martin F. Hennessey, the town founder. However, there was another town named Oney and it was renamed Albert. Martin F. Hennessey who was the founder was the post master general as well as owned the general store, hotel, and three cotton gins.

The post office in Albert was slated for possible closure by the US Postal Service in 2011 but remains open as of 2017.

Albert is served by the Binger-Oney Public School District.

== Sources ==
- Shirk, George H.; Oklahoma Place Names; University of Oklahoma Press; Norman, Oklahoma; 1987: ISBN 0-8061-2028-2 .
