= Oklahoma State Highway 146 =

State highway in Oklahoma, United States

State Highway 146

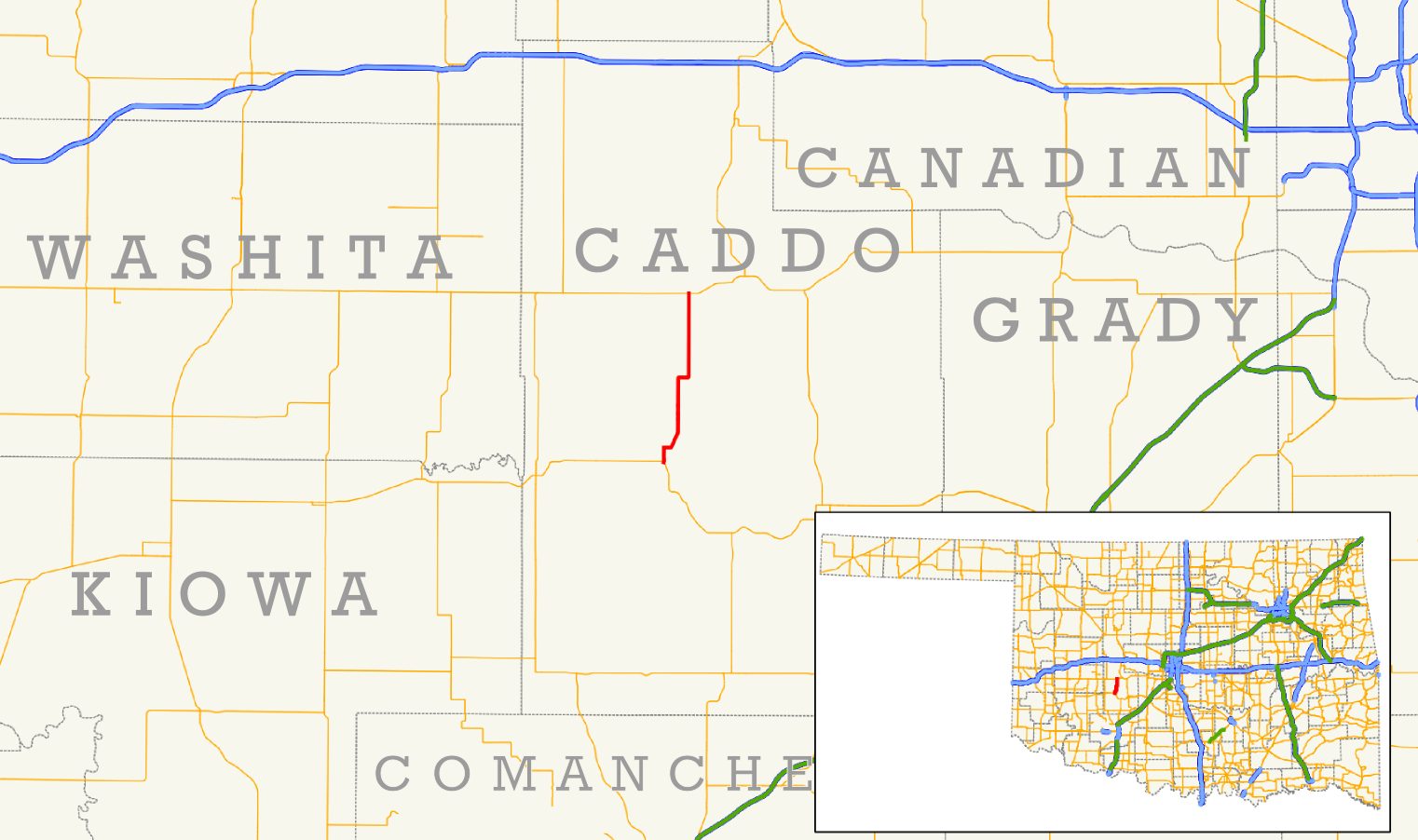

Route information
- Maintained by ODOT
- Length: 13.32 mi (21.44 km)
- Existed: c. 1961–present

Major junctions
- South end: SH-9 north of Ft. Cobb
- North end: SH-152 southwest of Binger

Location
- Country: United States
- State: Oklahoma

Highway system
- Oklahoma State Highway System; Interstate; US; State; Turnpikes
← SH-145	→ SH-147

State Highway 146 (abbreviated SH-146) is a short state highway in Caddo County, Oklahoma. It runs for 13.32 miles (21.44 km), connecting State Highway 9 to State Highway 152, at an intersection sometimes known as Three-Way Corner. It provides access to Fort Cobb Lake and Fort Cobb State Park. Along the way it passes through Albert. It has no lettered spur routes.

SH-146 was added to the state highway system around 1961. The highway was established with its present-day routing and has always been paved along the entirety of its route.

== Route description ==
State Highway 146 begins at SH-9 north of Fort Cobb. SH-146 heads due north for one mile (1.6 km) before making a sharp turn to the east. After approximately one-half mile (0.80 km), the highway turns north-northwest, crossing over Cobb Creek, the outlet of Fort Cobb Lake. The highway then resumes a due north course, passing about one mile (1.6 km) east of the lake. After around five miles (8.0 km), the highway makes another ninety-degree turn to due east, returning to due north after approximately three-quarters of a mile (1.21 km). Two miles (3.2 km) north of this curve, the highway passes through Albert, an unincorporated location. SH-146 continues north of Albert for five miles (8.0 km) before reaching Three Way Corner, its junction with SH-152, where it ends.

== History ==
SH-146 first appeared on the 1962 official state map. At this time, the highway followed its present-day route, and its entire length was paved. No changes have been made to the route since 1962.

== Junction list ==
The entire route is in Caddo County.

Location	mi	km	Destinations	Notes
	0.00	0.00	SH-9	Southern terminus
	13.32	21.44	SH-152	Northern terminus
1.000 mi = 1.609 km; 1.000 km = 0.621 mi
