= Washita County, Oklahoma =

County in Oklahoma, United States

- County
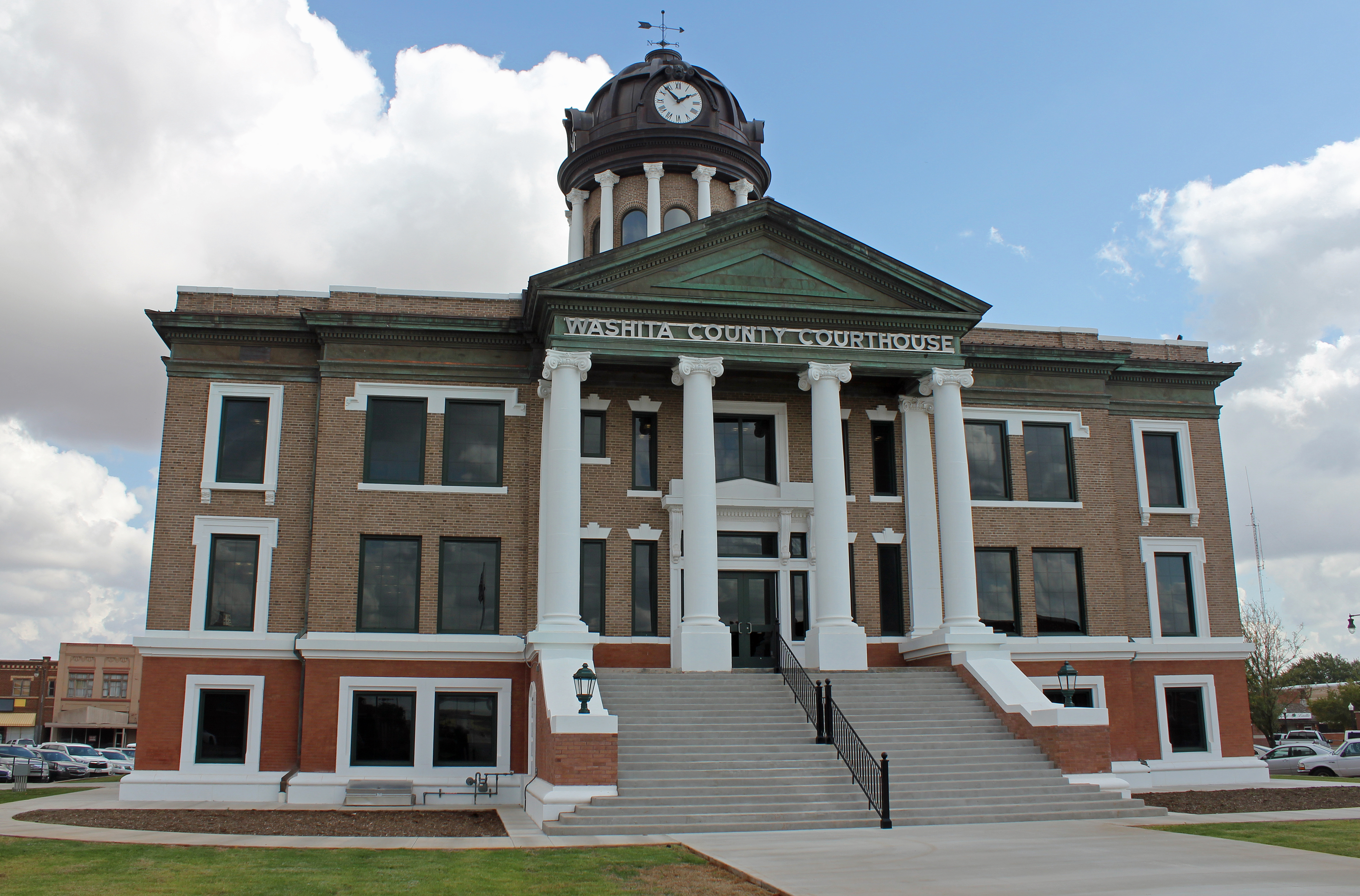
- The Washita County Courthouse in 2015.

- Location within the U.S. state of Oklahoma
- Coordinates: 35°17′N 98°59′W
- Country: United States
- State: Oklahoma
- Founded: 1891
- Named for: Washita River
- Seat: New Cordell
- Largest city: New Cordell

Area
  - Total: 1,009 sq mi (2,610 km^{2})
  - Land: 1,003 sq mi (2,600 km^{2})
  - Water: 5.6 sq mi (15 km^{2}) 0.6%

Population (2020)
  - Total: 10,924
  - Estimate (2025): 10,884 ▼
  - Density: 10.89/sq mi (4.205/km^{2})
- Time zone: UTC−6 (Central)
  - Summer (DST): UTC−5 (CDT)
- Congressional district: 3rd

Washita County is a county located in the U.S. state of Oklahoma. As of the 2020 census, the population was 10,924. Its county seat is New Cordell. The county seat was formerly located in Cloud Chief. The county was created in 1891.

== History ==
In 1883, John Miles leased 3,000,000 acres (12,000 km^{2}) of Cheyenne and Arapaho land to seven cattlemen. However, arguments soon developed between the cattlemen and the tribesmen. In 1885, the Federal government terminated all of the leases and ordered the cattlemen to remove their stock.

The area was settled in 1886, when John Seger established a colony along Cobb Creek. Seger convinced 120 Cheyenne and Arapaho to settle near the old ranch headquarters at Cobb Creek. The intent was that "Seger's Colony" would teach these tribes how to farm, using modern agricultural methods. The name, Seger's Colony, would be shortened and become the present day town of Colony, Oklahoma.

After the government declared the excess lands of the Cheyenne and Arapaho Indian Reservation available for non-Indian settlement, the Cheyenne-Arapaho Opening was made available to homesteading on April 19, 1892, in the Land Run of 1892. At that time, the town of Tacola, soon renamed to Cloud Chief, was designated by the Secretary of the Interior as the county seat.

Washita County is located in that part of western Oklahoma which was included in County H of the Territory of Oklahoma, an organized incorporated territory of the United States that existed from May 2, 1890, until November 16, 1907, when it was joined with the Indian Territory and admitted to the Union as the State of Oklahoma. The county itself was renamed for the Washita River. The French had called the river "Faux Ouachita", literally meaning "false Washita", to distinguish it from the ‘true’ Ouachita in Arkansas and Louisiana. The spelling of the name of the Oklahoma Washita was changed by substituting "w" for "ou".

An election in 1900 designated the town of Cordell as the county seat. It was favored by the majority because it was located in the center of the county. The election result was contested in court. The Oklahoma Territorial Supreme Court ruled in 1904 that the seat could not be moved without Federal authorization. The U. S. Congress moved the seat to Cordell in 1906. When the Oklahoma Constitution went into effect at statehood in 1907, it confirmed Cordell (by then relocated and renamed New Cordell) as the county seat.

In 1948, the nation's first flood control dam under the authorization of the Flood Control Act of 1944 was completed in the Cloud Creek Watershed in Washita County.

== Geography ==
Road map of Washita County

According to the U.S. Census Bureau, the county has a total area of 1,009 square miles (2,610 km^{2}), of which 1,006 square miles (2,610 km^{2}) is land and 5.6 square miles (15 km^{2}) (0.6%) is water. The county lies in the Western Redbeds Plains sub-region of the Osage Plains. The Washita River drains most of the county, except that the southwest corner drains into the North Fork of the Red River

=== Adjacent counties ===
- Custer County - north
- Caddo County - east
- Kiowa County - south
- Beckham County - west

== Demographics ==
Historical population
Census	Pop.	Note	%±
1910	25,034		—
1920	22,237		−11.2%
1930	29,435		32.4%
1940	22,279		−24.3%
1950	17,657		−20.7%
1960	18,121		2.6%
1970	12,141		−33.0%
1980	13,798		13.6%
1990	11,441		−17.1%
2000	11,508		0.6%
2010	11,629		1.1%
2020	10,924		−6.1%
2025 (est.)	10,884	▼	−0.4%
U.S. Decennial Census; 1790-1960 1900-1990; 1990-2000 2010

=== 2020 census ===
As of the 2020 census, the county had a population of 10,924. Of the residents, 26.1% were under the age of 18 and 19.3% were 65 years of age or older; the median age was 39.9 years. For every 100 females there were 96.7 males, and for every 100 females age 18 and over there were 92.8 males.

The racial makeup of the county was 83.9% White, 0.9% Black or African American, 3.1% American Indian and Alaska Native, 0.2% Asian, 2.7% from some other race, and 9.2% from two or more races. Hispanic or Latino residents of any race comprised 9.0% of the population.

There were 4,229 households in the county, of which 33.2% had children under the age of 18 living with them and 24.0% had a female householder with no spouse or partner present. About 26.3% of all households were made up of individuals and 13.4% had someone living alone who was 65 years of age or older.

There were 5,121 housing units, of which 17.4% were vacant. Among occupied housing units, 72.1% were owner-occupied and 27.9% were renter-occupied. The homeowner vacancy rate was 2.9% and the rental vacancy rate was 17.5%.

=== 2010 census ===
As of the 2010 United States census, there were 11,629 people, 4,599 households, and 3,186 families residing in the county. The population density was 11.5 people per square mile (4.4 people/km^{2}). There were 5,479 housing units at an average density of 5.4 units per square mile (2.1/km^{2}). The racial makeup of the county was 95.8% white, 0.7% black or African American, 3% Native American, 0.2% Asian, less than 0.1% Pacific Islander, 3.6% from other races, and 4.2% from two or more races. Eight percent of the population were Hispanic or Latino of any race. Ninety-six percent spoke only English and 3.3% spoke Spanish.

There were 4,599 households, out of which 33.1% had children under the age of 18 living with them, 54.8% were married couples living together, 9.5% had a female householder with no husband present, 5% had a male household with no wife present, and 30.7% were non-families. Individuals living alone accounted for 27.1% of households, and individuals 65 years of age or older living alone accounted for 13% of households. The average household size was 2.48 and the average family size was 2.98.

In the county, the population was spread out, with 25.8% under the age of 18, 7.4% from 18 to 24, 23.4% from 25 to 44, 26.3% from 45 to 64, and 17.1% who were 65 years of age or older. The median age was 39 years. For every 100 females there were 93.90 males. For every 100 females age 18 and over, there were 89.20 males.

The median income for a household in the county was $44,331, and the median income for a family was $56,619. Males had a median income of $42,149 versus $31,402 for females. The per capita income for the county was $22,781. About 12% of families and 16% of the population were below the poverty line, including 25% of those under age 18 and 10.7% of those age 65 or over.

== Politics ==
Voter Registration and Party Enrollment as of June 30, 2023
Party	Number of Voters	Percentage
Democratic	1,586	24.18%
Republican	4,017	61.23%
Others	957	14.59%
Total	6,560	100%

Prior to 1952, Washita County was dominated by the Democratic Party as part of the Solid South. However, it backed the national winner in every presidential election from 1928 to 1992 except for 1956 and 1960. It last voted for a Democratic presidential candidate in 1992.

United States presidential election results for Washita County, Oklahoma
Year	Republican		Democratic		Third party(ies)	
Year	No.	%	No.	%	No.	%
1908	1,118	32.82%	1,867	54.82%	421	12.36%
1912	1,100	31.14%	1,665	47.14%	767	21.72%
1916	958	25.32%	2,107	55.68%	719	19.00%
1920	2,070	45.85%	2,125	47.07%	320	7.09%
1924	1,357	33.47%	2,325	57.35%	372	9.18%
1928	3,572	63.28%	2,024	35.85%	49	0.87%
1932	887	12.79%	6,049	87.21%	0	0.00%
1936	1,792	25.49%	5,205	74.05%	32	0.46%
1940	2,978	41.10%	4,256	58.74%	11	0.15%
1944	2,706	43.31%	3,524	56.40%	18	0.29%
1948	1,637	27.45%	4,326	72.55%	0	0.00%
1952	3,914	55.20%	3,177	44.80%	0	0.00%
1956	2,552	44.44%	3,191	55.56%	0	0.00%
1960	3,209	57.07%	2,414	42.93%	0	0.00%
1964	2,147	39.14%	3,339	60.86%	0	0.00%
1968	2,592	49.65%	1,771	33.92%	858	16.43%
1972	3,578	71.45%	1,305	26.06%	125	2.50%
1976	2,165	39.14%	3,304	59.74%	62	1.12%
1980	3,206	59.67%	2,044	38.04%	123	2.29%
1984	3,847	70.85%	1,547	28.49%	36	0.66%
1988	2,402	50.62%	2,290	48.26%	53	1.12%
1992	1,912	35.81%	1,929	36.13%	1,498	28.06%
1996	1,994	42.65%	1,913	40.92%	768	16.43%
2000	2,850	63.79%	1,564	35.00%	54	1.21%
2004	3,705	73.44%	1,340	26.56%	0	0.00%
2008	3,724	77.97%	1,052	22.03%	0	0.00%
2012	3,494	80.95%	822	19.05%	0	0.00%
2016	3,854	83.22%	588	12.70%	189	4.08%
2020	4,086	85.53%	598	12.52%	93	1.95%
2024	4,030	86.63%	551	11.84%	71	1.53%

== Communities ==
=== Cities ===
- Clinton (part)
- New Cordell (county seat)

=== Towns ===
- Bessie
- Burns Flat
- Canute
- Colony
- Corn
- Dill City
- Foss
- Rocky
- Sentinel

=== Unincorporated communities ===
- Cloud Chief
- Port

== Education ==
School districts include:

- Burns Flat-Dill City Schools
- Canute Public Schools
- Carnegie Public Schools
- Clinton Public Schools
- Cordell Public Schools
- Elk City Public Schools
- Hydro-Eakly Public Schools
- Merritt Public Schools
- Mountain View-Gotebo Schools
- Sentinel Public Schools
- Weatherford Public Schools

== Transportation ==
=== Major highways ===
- I-40
- US 183
- SH-6
- SH-42
- SH-44
- SH-54
  - SH-54A
  - SH-54B
- SH-55
- SH-115
- SH-152
- SH-183A

== See also ==
- National Register of Historic Places listings in Washita County, Oklahoma
