= U.S. Route 62 in Oklahoma =

Highway in Oklahoma

U.S. Highway 62
- US 62 highlighted in red

Route information
- Maintained by ODOT
- Length: 402.48 mi (647.73 km)

Major junctions
- West end: US 62 at the Texas state line near Hollis
- US 283 in Altus; US 183 in Snyder; I-44 / US 277 / US 281 in Lawton; US 81 in Chickasha; I-240 / I-35 / I-40 in Oklahoma City; I-335 / Kickapoo Turnpike in Oklahoma City; US 377 in Prague; US 75 / US 266 in Henryetta; US 64 / US 69 in Muskogee; US 59 in Westville
- East end: US 62 at the Arkansas state line near Westville

Location
- Country: United States
- State: Oklahoma
- Counties: Harmon, Jackson, Kiowa, Comanche, Caddo, Grady, McClain, Cleveland, Oklahoma, Lincoln, Okfuskee, Okmulgee, Muskogee, Cherokee, Adair

Highway system
- United States Numbered Highway System; List; Special; Divided; Oklahoma State Highway System; Interstate; US; State; Turnpikes
← US 60	→ SH-63

In Oklahoma, U.S. Highway 62 (US 62) runs diagonally across the state, from the Texas state line in far southwestern Oklahoma to the Arkansas state line near Fayetteville. US-62 spends a total of 402.48 miles (647.73 km) in the Sooner State. The highway passes through fifteen of Oklahoma's counties. Along the way the route serves two of Oklahoma's largest cities, Lawton and Oklahoma City, as well as many regionally important cities, like Altus, Chickasha, Muskogee, and Tahlequah. Despite this, US-62 has no lettered spur routes like many other U.S. routes in Oklahoma do.

Since 1930, US-62 has been a part of Oklahoma's highway system. The section of the Interstate system's route that passes through Oklahoma City was altered several times after it was established in order to accommodate the presence of the new freeways. The present-day route of US-62 includes concurrencies with I-44, I-240, I-35, and I-40.

== Route description ==
=== Southwestern Oklahoma ===
US-62 enters Oklahoma in Harmon County, 5 miles (8.0 km) west of Hollis. It then passes through that town, the county seat, where it serves as the southern terminus of State Highway 30. US-62 meets the northern terminus of SH-5 in Gould. The highway passes through unincorporated McQueen 4 miles (6.4 km) and then enters Jackson County. Just east of Duke, the route crosses SH-34. Nine miles (14 km) later, US-62 becomes a multilane highway and begins a concurrency with SH-6. The two highways travel together into Altus, where they intersect US-283. SH-6 follows US-283 northward out of town, while US-62 heads east towards Headrick. US-62 runs just north of that town before crossing the North Fork of the Red River onto the Kiowa–Tillman County line.

US-62 continues eastward, sending US-62 BUS north to Snyder, which was the original US-62 alignment in the area. The county line then turns south of US-62, and the route has an interchange with US-183. US-62 heads farther east, meeting the other end of US-62 BUS 3 miles (4.8 km) later. US-62 serves as the southern terminus of the northern State Highway 54 3 miles (4.8 km) east of this. The road then enters Comanche County, where it serves as the southern border of Fort Sill. It serves as the southern terminus of another Oklahoma state highway, SH-115, near Cache. A few miles of the highway east of SH-115 is freeway-grade. Continuing east, US-62 becomes an expressway, Rogers Lane, that serves the north side of Lawton (along with several Ft. Sill gates). In eastern Lawton, the highway has an interchange with Interstate 44 and begins a concurrency with it (joining at Exit 40B), along with US-277 and US-281.

I-44/US-62/277/281 head northward through Fort Sill. At Exit 45, the freeway serves as the eastern terminus of State Highway 49. The three U.S. routes split off at Exit 46, with I-44 continuing onto the northern section of the H. E. Bailey Turnpike. US-277 splits off to the east 5 miles (8.0 km) later, and NW Meers Porter Hill road to the west. US-62/281 then meet SH-19 in Apache. SH-9 begins overlapping the two U.S. routes 10 miles (16 km) north of Apache. The three routes continue into Anadarko, where State Highway 8 briefly joins the concurrency. US-283 and SH-8 split off to the north, while US-62/SH-9 head out of town to the east.

=== Central Oklahoma ===
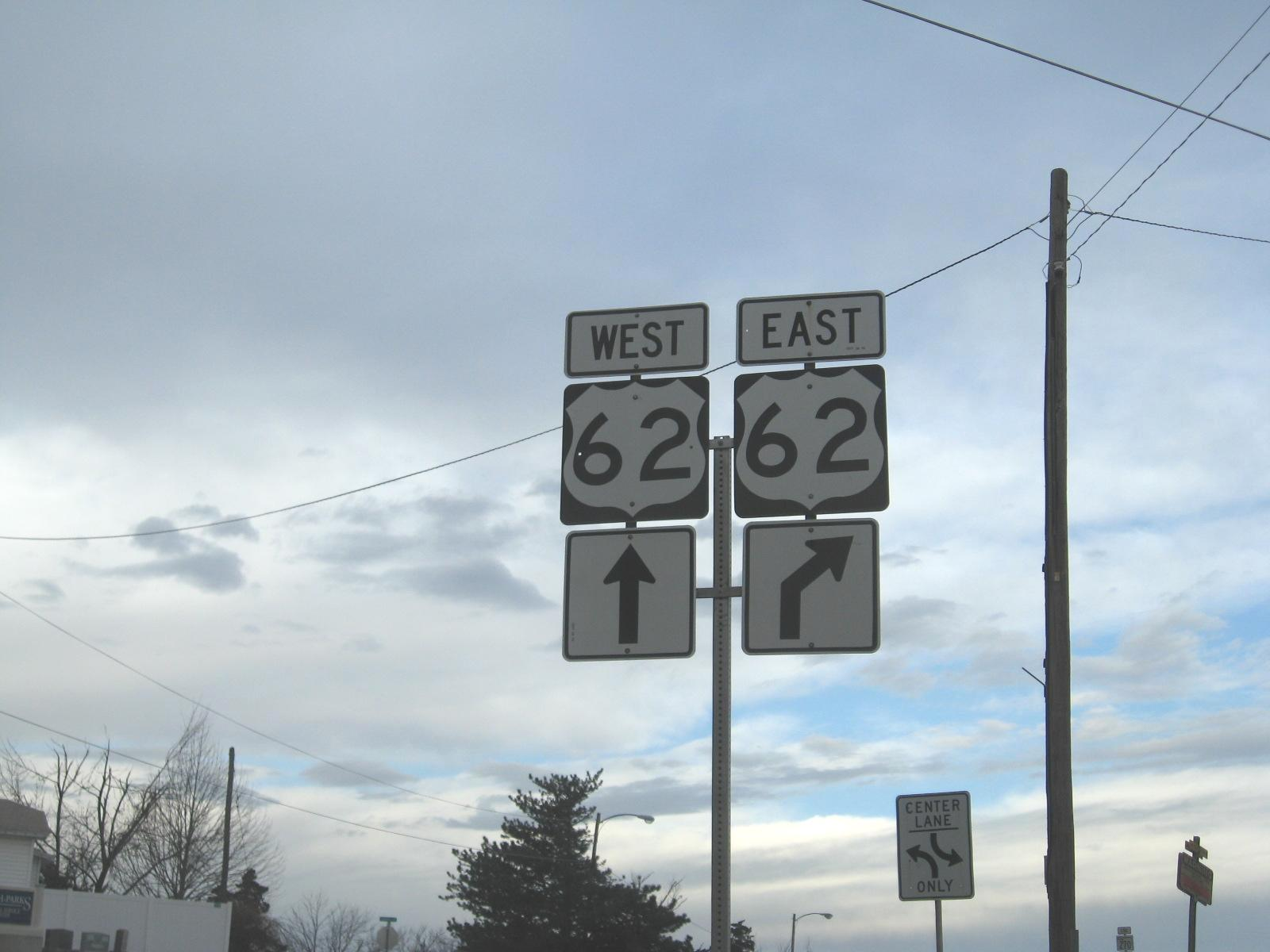
US-62 signage in Harrah

US-62/SH-9 cross into Grady County just west of Verden. At the western limits of Chickasha, US-81 joins the concurrency. In downtown Chickasha, US-81 splits off to the south, and US-277 once again joins with US-62. In far eastern Chickasha, the routes have an interchange with I-44 (the H.E. Bailey Turnpike). US-62/277/SH-9 serve as the southern terminus of SH-92 and the western terminus of SH-39. The three highways then angle northeast towards Blanchard, where they are briefly joined by State Highway 76. Northeast of Blanchard, they are carried by an expressway. SH-9 splits off at a diamond interchange that also serves as the eastern terminus of the H.E. Bailey Turnpike Spur. The two U.S. routes continue north into Newcastle, running through town on a five-lane (two lanes in each direction plus center turn lane) alignment. On the northern rim of Newcastle, the two routes encounter I-44 once again, at the northern terminus of the Bailey Turnpike. US-62 joins eastbound I-44 toward Oklahoma City, while US-277 terminates at the interchange.

I-44/US-62 pick up State Highway 37 at Exit 107, and the three highways cross the Canadian River into Cleveland County and Oklahoma City. SH-37 then splits off at Exit 110. Just north of the Oklahoma County line, I-44 has an interchange at the western terminus of Interstate 240 at Exit 115, and US-62 follows it east to Exit 4B, where it begins to concur with I-35/US-77. I-35/US-62/77 head northward to the Fort Smith Junction. US-77 splits off to join with Interstate 235, while I-35/US-77 join with eastbound I-40/US-270. I-35/US-62 split off to the north after just over a mile. US-62 leaves I-35 at Exit 130, turning east onto N.E. 23rd St., an at-grade street

US-62 serves some of Oklahoma City's eastern suburbs, including far northern Midwest City, far southern Spencer, Nicoma Park, and Choctaw. In eastern Harrah, the route meets the west terminus of State Highway 270. The highway then crosses into far southern Lincoln County, where it crosses SH-120 at Midway. US-62 runs through two more unincorporated communities, Fowler and Jacktown; the latter is the site of the US-62/US-177 junction. US-62 enters Meeker 6 miles (9.7 km) later, where it meets up with SH-18. 12 miles (19 km) further east, in Prague, it encounters US-377/SH-99.

=== Green Country ===
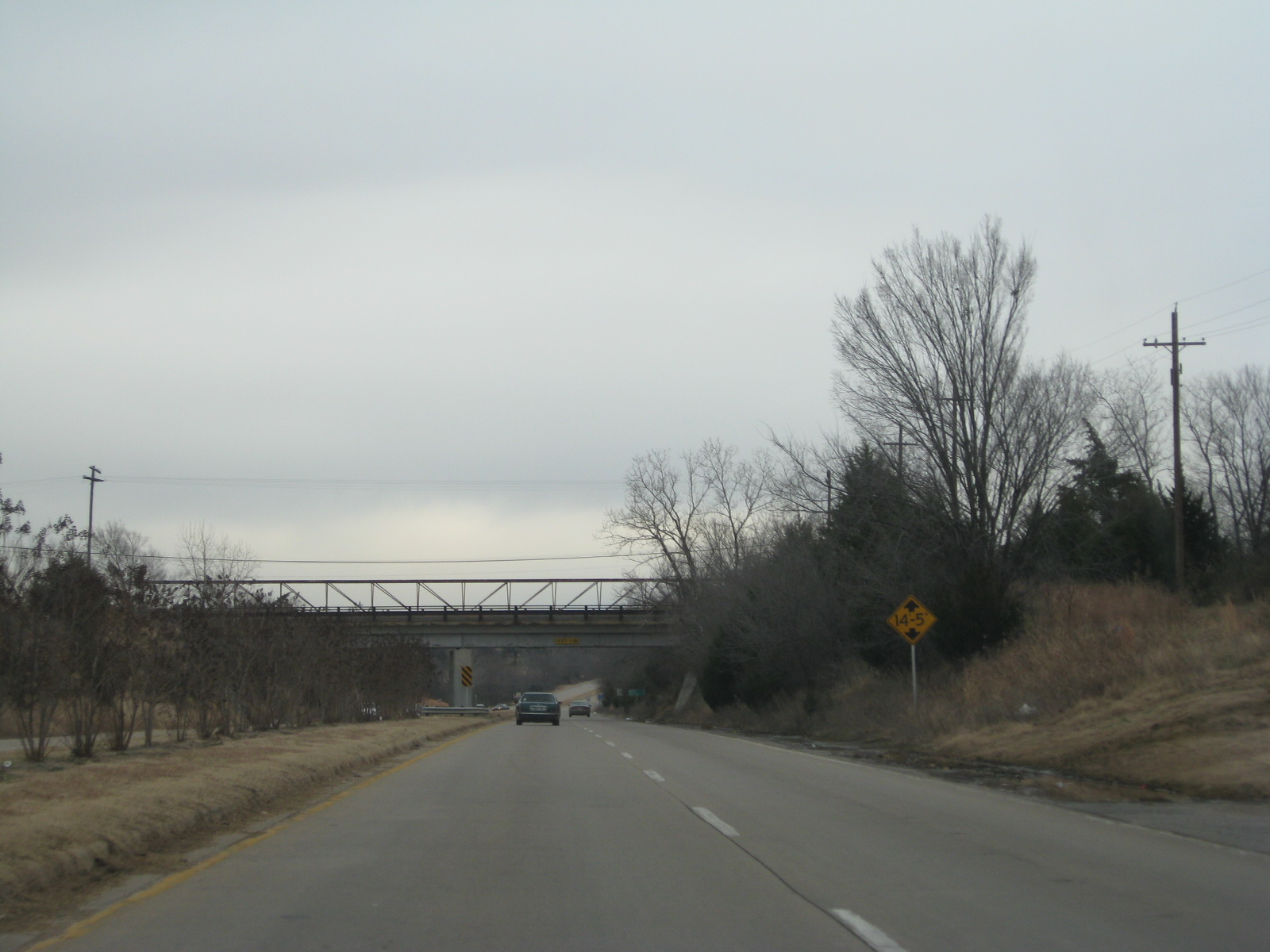
U.S. Highway 62 just east of Okmulgee

US-62 enters eastern Oklahoma's Green Country as it crosses into Okfuskee County west of Paden. It begins to turn southeast, intersecting State Highway 48 west of Castle, before joining once again with I-40 near Okemah, at Exit 221. US-75 also joins the interstate, 10 miles (16 km) farther east at Exit 231. The two U.S. routes split off at Exit 240B, where they continue the mainline of the Indian Nation Turnpike, which terminates at I-40. The two U.S. routes serve eastern Henryetta, and west of Dewar, they are the western terminus of U.S. Highway 266. In Okmulgee, US-62 turns east while US-75 continues north toward the Tulsa area. US-62 heads through Morris, where it intersects SH-52. The highway then has a 9-mile (14 km) overlap with SH-72, after which it begins a concurrency with US-64.

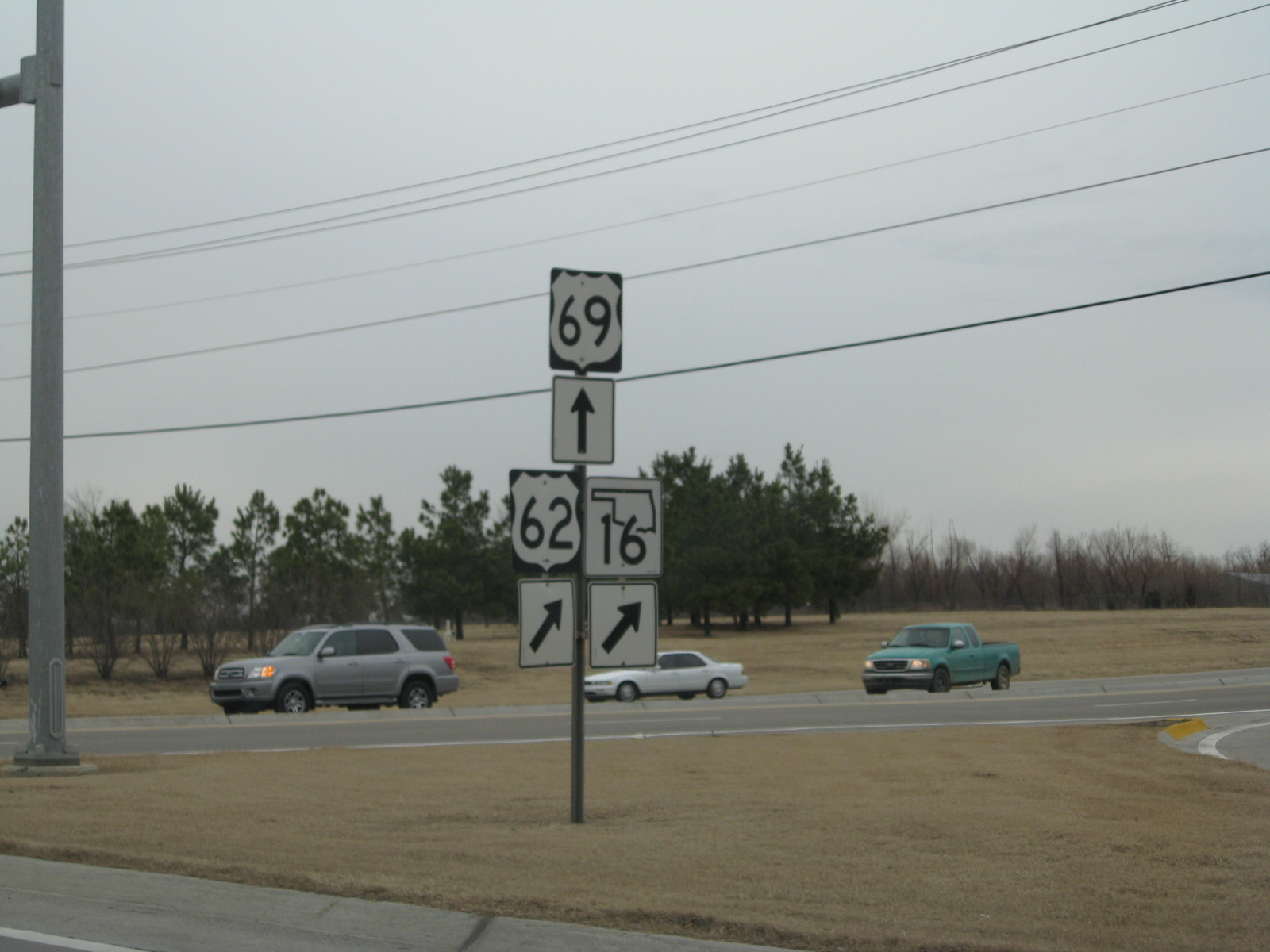
US-62 and US-69 in Muskogee

US-62/64 split up in Muskogee, where US-62 briefly overlaps with US-69. On the east side of town, it has an interchange with the Muskogee Turnpike/SH-165 freeway. Near Ft. Gibson, US-62 begins to concur with State Highway 10, and the two routes stay joined through Tahlequah. US-62 starts to overlap State Highway 51 in Tahlequah as well; the two highways split up near Eldon. The route enters Adair County near Proctor. It intersects with US-59 in Westville before US-62 crosses the state line into Arkansas.

== History ==
When US-62 first appeared on the state highway map in 1930, it had the same basic routing as it did today. In 1930, most of the highway was of gravel or earthen construction. The only portions of the highway that were paved were from Chickasha to Tabler, from Newcastle to Oklahoma City and Meeker, from Okemah to Morris, and from just south of the US-64 junction to Fort Gibson. By 1948, the entire stretch of US-62 through Oklahoma had been paved.

=== Oklahoma City routing ===
On 1950-03-06, US-62 was rerouted through Oklahoma City. US-62 followed Newcastle Boulevard into the city and turned eastbound onto S.E. 29th Street, which it followed to Robinson Avenue. It then turned north onto Robinson, which was also US-77, towards downtown. Through downtown, US-62 followed Robinson, while US-77 paralleled it one block to the east on Broadway. At N.E. 23rd Street, US-62 turned east, concurring with US-270, US-66 CITY, and the second State Highway 1. US-77 also ran along 23rd Street from Broadway to Lincoln Boulevard, where it split off to the north, along with US-66 CITY. US-62/270/SH-1 then continued along 23rd Street to Spencer.

US-62 was realigned once again on April 6, 1955.

US-62 was realigned for a third time on September 4, 1961. This routing was only meant to be temporary, following Agnew, Exchange, and Reno Avenues to downtown. This change was followed up by the September 4, 1963 rerouting, which put US-62 onto its present-day routing (though I-240 did not exist yet, and I-44 still ended at I-35).

== Major intersections ==
County	Location	mi	km	Exit	Destinations	Notes
Oklahoma–Texas line		0.00	0.00	US 62 west continues into Texas		
Harmon	Hollis	5.0	8.0		SH-30	Southern terminus of SH-30
Harmon	Gould	13.3	21.4		SH-5	Northern terminus of SH-5
Jackson	Duke	25.4	40.9		SH-34	
Jackson		33.9	54.6		SH-6	Western end of SH-6 concurrency
Jackson	Altus	38.9	62.6		US 283 / SH-6	Eastern end of SH-6 concurrency
Kiowa		56.3	90.6		US 62 Bus.	
Kiowa	Snyder	59.9	96.4		US 183	Diamond interchange
Kiowa		63.2	101.7		US 62 Bus.	
Kiowa		65.8	105.9		SH-54	Southern terminus of SH-54
Comanche	Cache	78.8	126.8	—	SH-115	West end of freeway, southern terminus of SH-115
Comanche		83.9	135.0	—	Deyo	
Comanche	Lawton	86.1	138.6	—	Quanah Parker Trailway	East end of freeway; eastbound left exit and westbound left entrance
Comanche	Lawton	91.4	147.1		Sheridan Road	Parclo interchange
Comanche	Lawton	92.4	148.7		Fort Sill Boulevard	Parclo interchange
Comanche	Lawton	93.4	150.3		I-44 west / US 277 / US 281 south (H.E. Bailey Turnpike west)	I-44 exit 40B; western end of I-44/US-277/US-281 concurrency
Comanche	Lawton	93.4	150.3	40C	NE Rogers Lane	Exit numbers follow I-44; no exit number eastbound
Comanche	Lawton	95.0	152.9	41	Fort Sill Key Gate	Department of Defense ID required
Comanche		98.7	158.8	45	SH-49 – Carnegie, Medicine Park	
Comanche		99.5	160.1		I-44 Toll / H.E. Bailey Turnpike east – Chickasha, Oklahoma City	I-44 exit 46; eastern end of I-44 concurrency; eastbound left exit and westbound left entrance
Comanche	Richards Spur	103.8	167.0		US 277 north – Chickasha, Elgin	Northern end of US-277 concurrency
Caddo	Apache	112.6	181.2		SH-19	Western end of SH-19 concurrency
Caddo	Apache	113.2	182.2		SH-19	Eastern end of SH-19 concurrency
Caddo		123.2	198.3		SH-9	Western end of SH-9 concurrency
Caddo	Anadarko	131.6	211.8		US 281 / SH-8	Northern end of US-281 concurrency, western end of SH-8 concurrency
Caddo	Anadarko	132.2	212.8		SH-8	Eastern end of SH-8 concurrency
Grady	Chickasha	148.0	238.2		US 81	Western end of US-81 concurrency
Grady	Chickasha	149.7	240.9		US 81 / US 277	Eastern end of US-81 concurrency, western end of US-277 concurrency
Grady	Chickasha	149.8	241.1		2nd Street / 1st Street	Interchange; eastbound exit and westbound entrance
Grady	Chickasha	151.3	243.5		I-44 Toll / H.E. Bailey Turnpike	I-44 exit 83
Grady		153.0	246.2		SH-92	Southern terminus of SH-92
Grady	Tabler	156.5	251.9		SH-39	Western terminus of SH-39
McClain	Blanchard	167.3	269.2		SH-76	Western end of SH-76 concurrency
McClain	Blanchard	168.3	270.9		SH-76	Eastern end of SH-76 concurrency
McClain	Newcastle	173.0	278.4		SH-9 east to I-35 / H.E. Bailey Turnpike Norman spur (SH-4 Toll) – Norman, Mustang, Chickasha	Diamond interchange; eastern end of SH-9 concurrency
McClain	Newcastle	177.4	285.5		SH-130	Eastern terminus of SH-130
McClain	Newcastle	179.7	289.2		I-44 Toll / H.E. Bailey Turnpike west / US 277 ends – Chickasha, Lawton	Northern terminus of US-277; eastern terminus of H.E. Bailey Tpk.; eastern end of US-277 concurrency; western end of I-44 concurrency
McClain	Newcastle	180.6	290.6	108	SH-37 west – Minco, Tuttle	Exit numbers follow I-44; western end of SH-37 concurrency
McClain	Newcastle	181.1	291.5	108A	Frontage Road	Westbound exit and eastbound entrance
Cleveland	Oklahoma City	182.4	293.5	109	SW 149th Street	
Cleveland	Oklahoma City	183.4	295.2	110	SH-37 east (SW 134th Street) – Moore	Eastern end of SH-37 concurrency
Cleveland	Oklahoma City	184.5	296.9	111	SW 119th Street	
Cleveland	Oklahoma City	185.6	298.7	112	SW 104th Street	
Oklahoma	Oklahoma City	186.6	300.3	113	SW 89th Street	
Oklahoma	Oklahoma City	187.5	301.8	114	SW 74th Street	
Oklahoma	Oklahoma City	187.7	302.1	—	I-240 begins / I-44 east / SH-3 to I-40 – Tulsa, Wichita	Eastern end of I-44 concurrency; western end of I-240/SH-3 concurrency; I-44 exit 115, I-240 exit 1A
Oklahoma	Oklahoma City	188.3	303.0	1B	S. May Avenue	Exit numbers follow I-240
Oklahoma	Oklahoma City	189.3	304.6	1C	S. Penn Avenue	Full name is "Pennsylvania"
Oklahoma	Oklahoma City	190.3	306.3	2A	S. Western Avenue	
Oklahoma	Oklahoma City	191.3	307.9	2B	S. Walker Avenue	
Oklahoma	Oklahoma City	191.6	308.4	3	S. Santa Fe Avenue	
Oklahoma	Oklahoma City	192.2	309.3	3B	Shields Boulevard, Santa Fe Avenue	Westbound exit only
Oklahoma	Oklahoma City	192.9	310.4	4A	I-35 / US 77 south / I-240 / SH-3 east to I-40 – Dallas, Ft. Smith	Eastern end of I-240/SH-3 concurrency, western end of I-35/US-77 concurrency; exit number is for I-35/US-77 south; no exit number westbound; I-35 exit 121B, I-240 exit 4B
Oklahoma	Oklahoma City	193.6	311.6	122A	SE 66th Street	Exit numbers follow I-35; no eastbound entrance
Oklahoma	Oklahoma City	194.1	312.4	122B	SE 59th Street	
Oklahoma	Oklahoma City	194.7	313.3	123A	SE 51st Street	No eastbound entrance
Oklahoma	Oklahoma City	195.2	314.1	123B	SE 44th Street	No westbound entrance
Oklahoma	Oklahoma City	195.7	314.9	124A	Grand Boulevard	
Oklahoma	Oklahoma City	196.3	315.9	124B	SE 29th Street, SE 25th Street	Signed as exit 125A westbound
Oklahoma	Oklahoma City	197.2	317.4	125B	SE 15th Street	Signed as exit 125D westbound
Oklahoma	Oklahoma City	197.9	318.5	—	I-235 north (US-77 north) – Oklahoma Health Center, State Capitol, Edmond	Eastern end of US-77 concurrency; eastbound left exit and westbound entrance
Oklahoma	Oklahoma City	197.9	318.5	—	I-40 west (US-270 west) – Amarillo	Western end of I-40/US-270 concurrency; westbound exit and eastbound left entrance
Oklahoma	Oklahoma City	198.9	320.1	127	Reno Avenue – west / Eastern Avenue / M.L. King Avenue	Westbound exit is part of I-40/US-270 east exit; Reno Ave. not signed eastbound
Oklahoma	Oklahoma City	199.2	320.6	—	I-40 / US 270 east – Ft. Smith	Eastern end of I-40/US-270 concurrency
Oklahoma	Oklahoma City	200.4	322.5	129	NE 10th Street	
Oklahoma	Oklahoma City	201.2	323.8		I-35 north / NE 23rd Street west	I-35 exit 130; eastern end of I-35 concurrency
Oklahoma	Harrah				I-335 Toll (Kickapoo Turnpike)	Kickapoo Turnpike exit 138
Oklahoma	Harrah	218.4	351.5		SH-270	Western terminus of SH-270
Lincoln	Midway	223.0	358.9		SH-102	
Lincoln	Jacktown	228.4	367.6		US 177	
Lincoln	Meeker	234.4	377.2		SH-18	
Lincoln	Prague	246.5	396.7		US 377 / SH-99	
Okfuskee		264.4	425.5		SH-48	
Okfuskee	Okemah	270.2	434.8		SH-27 begins / SH-56 north	Northern terminus of SH-27; western end of SH-27/SH-56 concurrency
Okfuskee	Okemah	270.5	435.3		SH-56 south	Eastern end of SH-56 concurrency
Okfuskee	Okemah	271.1	436.3		I-40 west / SH-27 south – Oklahoma City, Wetumka	Eastern end of SH-27 concurrency; western end of I-40 concurrency; I-40 exit 221
Okfuskee		277.2	446.1	227	Clearview Road	Exit numbers follow I-40
Okfuskee		281.7	453.4	231	US 75 south – Wetumka, Weleetka	Western end of US-75 concurrency
Okmulgee	Henryetta			237	I-40 BL / US 62 Bus. east / US 75 Bus. north – Henryetta	
Okmulgee	Henryetta			240A	Indian Nation Turnpike south / I-40 east – McAlester, Dallas, Ft. Smith I-40 BL begins	Exit number is for Indian Nation Tpk.; no exit number southbound; eastern end of I-40 concurrency; southern end of I-40 Bus. concurrency; I-40 exit 240B
Okmulgee	Henryetta	287.7	463.0		I-40 BL / US 62 Bus. west / US 75 Bus. south (Main Street)	Northern end of I-40 Bus. concurrency
Okmulgee	Henryetta	290.3	467.2		US 266 east (6th Street) – Dewar, Grayson	Western terminus of US-266
Okmulgee	Okmulgee	303.2	488.0		US 75 north (Wood Drive)	Northern end of US-75 concurrency
Okmulgee	Okmulgee	304.9	490.7		SH-56 Loop	Eastern terminus of SH-56 Loop
Okmulgee	Morris	308.9	497.1		SH-52 (Hughes Avenue)	
Muskogee		320.2	515.3		SH-72	Western end of SH-72 concurrency
Muskogee		329.5	530.3		US 64 west / SH-72 north SH-16 west	Eastern end of SH-72 concurrency, western end of US-64 concurrency, western end of SH-16 concurrency
Muskogee		334.5	538.3		SH-162 north (124th Street West) – Taft	Southern terminus of SH-162
Muskogee	Muskogee	343.3	552.5		US 64 east / US 69 (32nd Street) / US 62 Bus. (Okmulgee Avenue)	Eastern end of US-64 concurrency, western end of US-69 concurrency
Muskogee	Muskogee	344.3	554.1		US 69 (32nd Street)	Eastern end of US-69 concurrency
Muskogee	Muskogee	347.8	559.7		SH-16 east (Okay Road)	Eastern end of SH-16 concurrency
Muskogee	Muskogee	349.5	562.5		SH-165 / Muskogee Turnpike – Ft. Smith, Port of Muskogee, Tulsa	Cloverleaf interchange
Muskogee		352.0	566.5		SH-10	Western end of SH-10 concurrency
Muskogee	Ft. Gibson	355.3	571.8		SH-80	Southern terminus of SH-80
Cherokee	Park Hill	372.3	599.2		SH-82	Southern end of SH-82 concurrency
Cherokee	Tahlequah	372.3	599.2		SH-51 / US 62 Bus.	Western end of SH-51 concurrency; south end of US Bus. 62
Cherokee	Tahlequah	374.6	602.9		SH-82 / US 62 Bus.	Northern end of SH-82 concurrency; east end of US Bus 62.
Cherokee	Tahlequah	376.5	605.9		SH-10	Northern end of SH-10 concurrency
Cherokee	Eldon	382.4	615.4		SH-51	Eastern end of SH-51 concurrency
Adair	Westville	395.4	636.3		US 59	
Oklahoma–Arkansas line		398.3	641.0	US 62 east continues into Arkansas		
1.000 mi = 1.609 km; 1.000 km = 0.621 mi: Concurrency terminus; Incomplete access; Tolled; Unopened

== Special routes ==
=== Snyder business loop ===
U.S. Highway 62 Business
- Location: Snyder
- Length: 7.6 mi (12.2 km)

Business U.S. Highway 62 (Bus. US 62) is a business route of US 62 in Snyder that is 7.6 miles (12.2 km) long. It starts at US 62 west of Snyder, intersects US 183 in Snyder, and ends at US 62 east of Snyder.

Major intersections
The entire route is in Kiowa County.

Location	mi	km	Destinations	Notes
	0.0	0.0	US 62 – Lawton, Altus	Western terminus
Snyder	4.7	7.6	US 183 (H Street) – Lawton, Hobart, Frederick	
	7.7	12.4	US 62 – Lawton, Altus	Eastern terminus
1.000 mi = 1.609 km; 1.000 km = 0.621 mi

=== Henryetta business loop ===
U.S. Highway 62 Business
- Location: Henryetta, Oklahoma
- Length: 2.94 mi (4.73 km)

U.S. Route 62 Business in Henryetta in Okmulgee County is another business route of US 62. The route is 2.94 miles (4.73 km) in length. It begins at I-40 exit 237 west of town. It then continues east through the town to end at US-62/75 east of downtown. The entirety of the route is concurrent with Business Loop I-40 and U.S. 75 Business.

=== Muskogee business loop ===
U.S. Highway 62 Business
- Location: Muskogee, Oklahoma

U.S. Route 62 Business in Muskogee, in Muskogee County is a third business route of US 62 in Oklahoma. The route runs in an overlap with US 64 Bus. along-Okmulgee Avenue and then turns north away from that route along North Main Street.

=== Tahlequah business loop ===
U.S. Highway 62 Business
- Location: Tahlequah, Oklahoma

U.S. Route 62 Business in Tahlequah in Cherokee County is a fourth business route of US 62 in Oklahoma. The route runs along former sections of the main route along Muskogee Avenue beginning at the western terminus of US 62/SH 82's overlap with SH 51, then runs north into downtown Tahlequah, where it turns right running east along East Downing Street until reaching its terminus at the east end of the US 62/SH 82 overlap.

U.S. Route 62
Previous state: Texas	Oklahoma	Next state: Arkansas
