= Cloud Chief, Oklahoma =

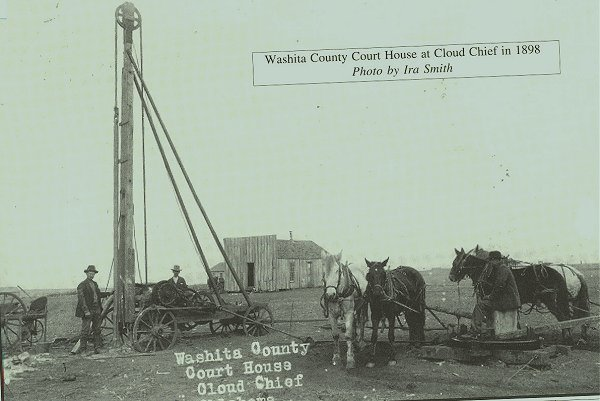
- Washita County Courthouse in Cloud Chief
- Nickname: Tacola
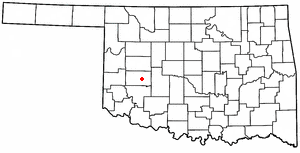
- Location in the State of Oklahoma
- Coordinates: 35°15′09″N 98°50′35″W
- Country: United States
- State: Oklahoma
- County: Washita County
- Elevation: 1,509 ft (460 m)
- Time zone: UTC-6 (CST)
  - Summer (DST): UTC-7 (CDT)
- GNIS feature ID: 1091475

Cloud Chief is a small unincorporated community in Washita County, Oklahoma, United States. Once the county seat of Washita County, it is now considered a ghost town. Only a few buildings remain, mostly in disrepair.

== History ==
The townsite was platted in April 1892, as Tacola, when the Cheyenne-Arapaho reservation was opened for settlement. A few weeks later, the town population was said to be over 3,000 inhabitants. The post office was established March 29, 1892, and Cloud Chief was designated by the U.S. Congress as the county seat of H County, Oklahoma Territory. Many of the new settlers left the town within a year. Cloud Chief was at the fringe of "Texas" and as a result was settled mainly by Texans. Nobody who competed for the town lots could ever forget the excitement. Fights over claims were commonplace, and the cry of "claimjumper" was heard. In two hours the town was established. Many of the settlers left almost immediately after their claims were legally staked, for they had six months from the time they filed to the time they had to settle on their claims.

Many of the settlers went home to get their families and households. Many had left their business hanging fire until they found out whether or not they could actually find a claim in the newly opened country. They had to sell out or close out their business and farms back home.

The population dwindled, but only for six months. Then the town began its growth that was to continue for an eight-year period. When Cloud Chief was at its peak it had population of about 700 people. However, by 1898 the population had begun to rise again.

In 1900 the people of newly formed Washita County, by a vote of 1,349 in favor to 282 in opposition, illegally moved the county seat to the more-centrally-located town of Cordell. Lawsuits followed, and reached the U.S. Supreme Court, which ruled the move illegal in 1904. Two county commissioners went to Washington, D.C., and persuaded Congress to pass legislation approving the move. President Theodore Roosevelt signed the law in 1906.

The Cloud Chief public schools opened for the 1892–1893 school year. The Works Progress Administration (WPA) built a high school in 1938, which closed after the 1959–1960 school year. The high school was known as the Cloud Chief Warriors. The Cloud Chief post office closed on December 31, 1964. The town also lost its charter in 1964.

Cloud Chief was also previously home of two newspapers. It was home to the Cloud Chief Witness, as well as the Cloud Chief Beacon. The Cloud Chief Beacon moved and became the Cordell Beacon immediately after the August 17, 1900, issue was printed. After moving to Cordell, the newspaper continued publication from January 13, 1905, until February 17, 1919.

== Notable people ==
- Durwood Merrill, baseball umpire

== Sources ==
- Fenn, Doyle. (1996) Cloud Chief: Original County Seat of Washita County, Oklahoma. Dexter, Michigan: Thomson-Shore, Inc.
- Boothe, Wayne. (2007) Images of America: Washita County. United States: Arcadia Publishing
