= Gotebo, Oklahoma =

- Town
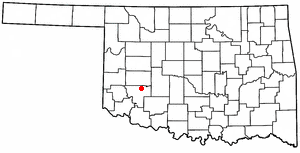
- Location of Gotebo, Oklahoma
- Coordinates: 35°04′16″N 98°52′27″W
- Country: United States
- State: Oklahoma
- County: Kiowa

Area
  - Total: 0.79 sq mi (2.04 km^{2})
  - Land: 0.79 sq mi (2.04 km^{2})
  - Water: 0 sq mi (0.00 km^{2})
- Elevation: 1,431 ft (436 m)

Population (2020)
  - Total: 174
  - Density: 221/sq mi (85.2/km^{2})
- Time zone: UTC-6 (Central (CST))
  - Summer (DST): UTC-5 (CDT)
- ZIP code: 73041
- Area code: 580
- FIPS code: 40-30350
- GNIS feature ID: 2412694

Gotebo /ˈɡoʊtɪboʊ/ is a town in Kiowa County, Oklahoma, United States. The population was 174 at the 2020 Census.

The town is named after the notable Kiowa Indian named Gotebo (1847 - 1927) (in Kiowa, [kʼóːdebõhõn]).

== History ==
The town now known as Gotebo was originally named Harrison (honoring President Benjamin Harrison) when it was founded in August 1901, during the opening of the Kiowa, Comanche, and Apache Reservation. A railroad station had been built nearby a few months before, which officials of the Chicago, Rock Island and Pacific Railway had named Gotebo, in honor of a well-respected Kiowa chief. He was one of the first Kiowa baptized at the Rainy Mountain Church, and was buried at the Rainy Mountain Indian Cemetery, between Gotebo and Mountain View. The name of the post office was soon changed from Harrison to Gotebo, and the town incorporated under the latter name.

== Geography ==
Gotebo is located 39 miles (63 km) southeast of Clinton and 51 miles (82 km) northwest of Lawton.

According to the United States Census Bureau, the town has a total area of 0.8 square miles (2.1 km^{2}), all land.

== Demographics ==
Historical population
Census	Pop.	Note	%±
1910	740		—
1920	737		−0.4%
1930	827		12.2%
1940	607		−26.6%
1950	574		−5.4%
1960	538		−6.3%
1970	378		−29.7%
1980	457		20.9%
1990	370		−19.0%
2000	272		−26.5%
2010	226		−16.9%
2020	174		−23.0%
U.S. Decennial Census

=== 2020 census ===
As of the 2020 census, Gotebo had a population of 174. The median age was 42.0 years. 20.7% of residents were under the age of 18 and 22.4% of residents were 65 years of age or older. For every 100 females there were 85.1 males, and for every 100 females age 18 and over there were 97.1 males age 18 and over.

0.0% of residents lived in urban areas, while 100.0% lived in rural areas.

There were 79 households in Gotebo, of which 21.5% had children under the age of 18 living in them. Of all households, 39.2% were married-couple households, 25.3% were households with a male householder and no spouse or partner present, and 29.1% were households with a female householder and no spouse or partner present. About 40.5% of all households were made up of individuals and 16.4% had someone living alone who was 65 years of age or older.

There were 113 housing units, of which 30.1% were vacant. The homeowner vacancy rate was 8.5% and the rental vacancy rate was 0.0%.

Racial composition as of the 2020 census
Race	Number	Percent
White	156	89.7%
Black or African American	0	0.0%
American Indian and Alaska Native	8	4.6%
Asian	0	0.0%
Native Hawaiian and Other Pacific Islander	1	0.6%
Some other race	1	0.6%
Two or more races	8	4.6%
Hispanic or Latino (of any race)	9	5.2%

=== 2000 census ===
As of the census of 2000, there were 272 people, 120 households, and 80 families residing in the town. The population density was 353.2 inhabitants per square mile (136.4/km^{2}). There were 157 housing units at an average density of 203.9 per square mile (78.7/km^{2}). The racial makeup of the town was 90.44% White, 7.35% Native American, 1.47% from other races, and 0.74% from two or more races. Hispanic or Latino of any race were 6.62% of the population.

There were 120 households, out of which 25.0% had children under the age of 18 living with them, 55.0% were married couples living together, 9.2% had a female householder with no husband present, and 33.3% were non-families. 31.7% of all households were made up of individuals, and 16.7% had someone living alone who was 65 years of age or older. The average household size was 2.27 and the average family size was 2.84.

In the town, the population was spread out, with 20.2% under the age of 18, 7.7% from 18 to 24, 22.1% from 25 to 44, 28.7% from 45 to 64, and 21.3% who were 65 years of age or older. The median age was 45 years. For every 100 females, there were 94.3 males. For every 100 females age 18 and over, there were 95.5 males.

The median income for a household in the town was $26,500, and the median income for a family was $35,156. Males had a median income of $25,694 versus $22,500 for females. The per capita income for the town was $14,783. About 8.2% of families and 14.3% of the population were below the poverty line, including 7.4% of those under the age of eighteen and 21.1% of those 65 or over.

== Economy ==
Agriculture (mainly cotton and wheat farming and cattle ranching) support the local economy. Many town residents are retired, while those who are employed generally commute to jobs in Hobart or Mountain View.
