= Oklahoma State Highway 77H =

State highway in Oklahoma, United States

State Highway 77H

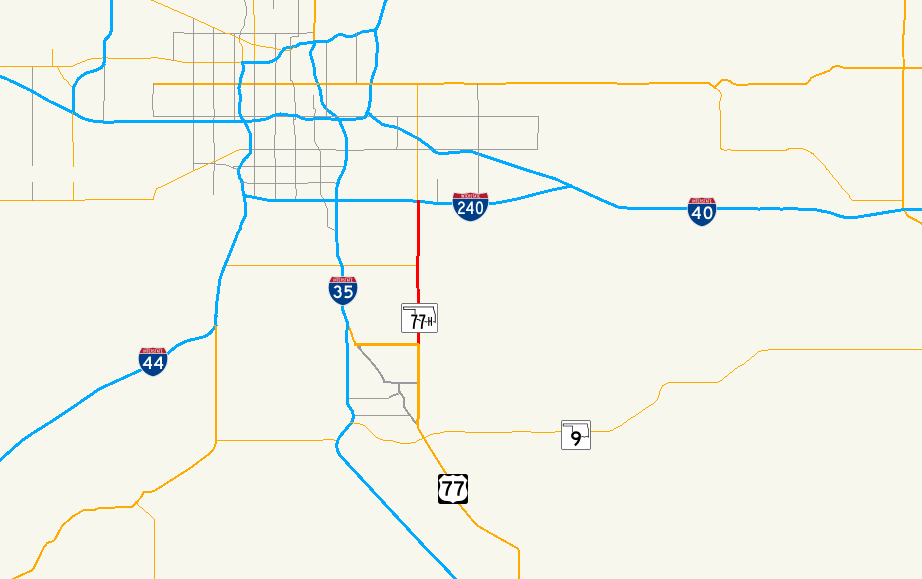

Route information
- Maintained by ODOT
- Length: 9.07 mi (14.60 km)
- Existed: 1950–1951, 1955–present

Major junctions
- South end: US 77 in Norman
- North end: I-240 / SH-3 in Oklahoma City

Location
- Country: United States
- State: Oklahoma

Highway system
- Oklahoma State Highway System; Interstate; US; State; Turnpikes
| ← US 77 | → SH-78 |

State Highway 77H is a spur that runs from US-77 in Norman, north through a small piece of unincorporated Cleveland County and Moore, to Oklahoma City. The state highway designation ends at I-240, although Sooner Road continues north to its terminus at I-35, I-44, Turner Turnpike, Kilpatrick Turnpike, and SH-66.

State Highway 77H was originally created to serve the now-defunct town of Hollywood. This likely explains why the suffix "H" was assigned when letters earlier in the alphabet were available.

== Route description ==
State Highway 77H begins at the intersection of 12th Avenue N.E. and Tecumseh Road in Norman. US-77 follows 12th Avenue south of the intersection and Tecumseh Road west of it, with SH-77H following 12th Avenue north of the intersection. Throughout its length, SH-77H is an undivided four-lane road. It intersects other streets at grade, and has numerous traffic signals.

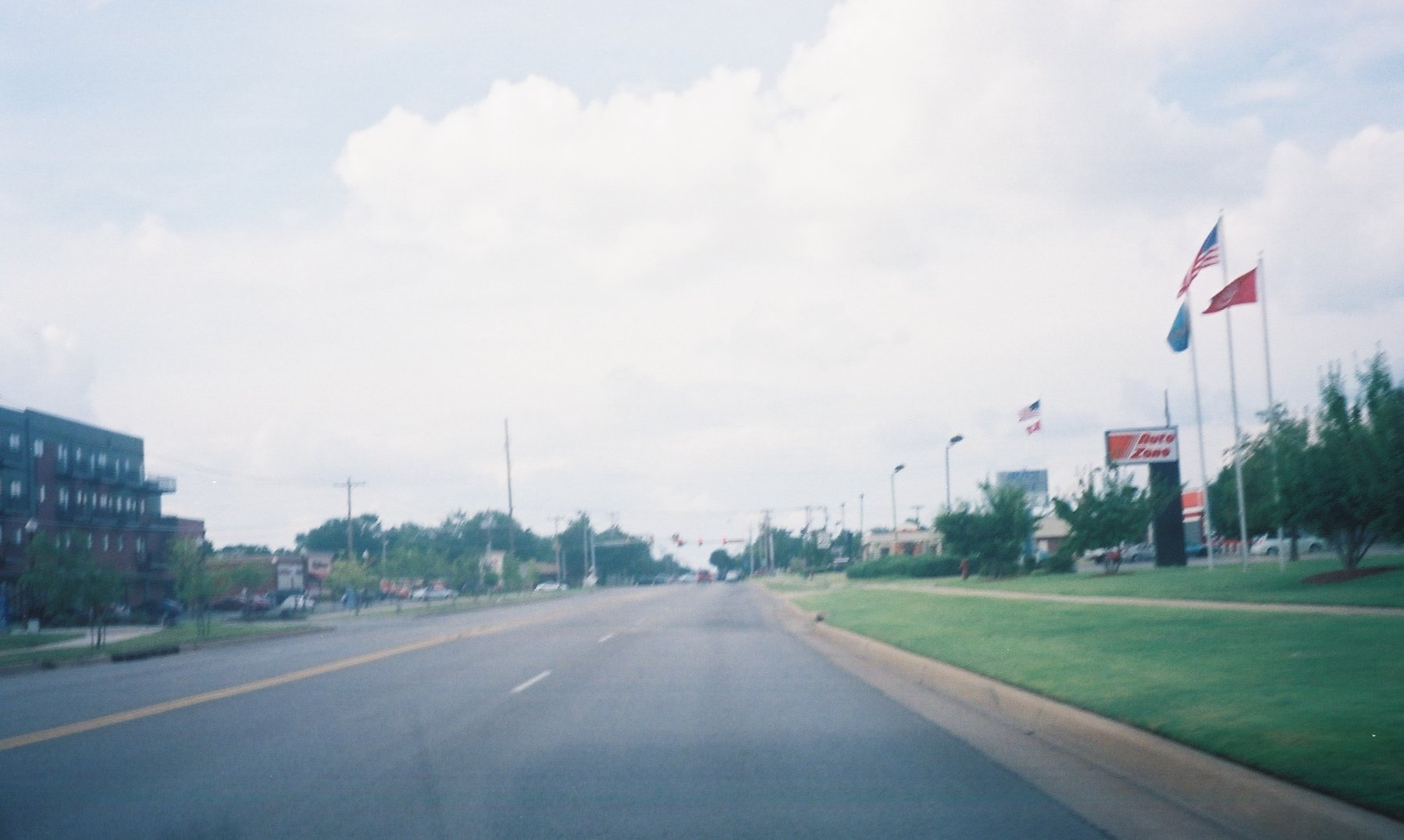
Former SH-77H (now part of US-77) following 12th Avenue in Norman

The northernmost mile of SH-77H (from S.E. 89th Street to I-240) is in Oklahoma County, and the remainder of the route is in Cleveland County.

The route is popular with local commuters as an alternative to I-35 between Norman and Oklahoma City. Norman commuters typically use it to head north to Tinker Air Force Base and the Midwest City–Del City area. Oklahoma City commuters typically drive south to the University of Oklahoma.

=== Designations ===
SH-77H is also designated as Sooner Road in Moore and Oklahoma City, and as 12th Avenue N.E. in Norman. Locals often refer to the entire length of the road as Sooner Road, ignoring both the highway number and its designation as 12th Avenue in Norman.

Oklahoma Senate Bill 280, passed by the 2003 Legislature, named the highway the Pearl Harbor/USS Oklahoma Memorial Highway. This designation was subsequently applied by the Oklahoma Transportation Commission on 2003-06-02. Signage was installed at each end of the highway displaying the name.

== History ==
State Highway 77H was originally commissioned on 1950-01-11, running from Hollywood in Cleveland County to the Oklahoma County line. This original iteration of SH-77H was decommissioned less than two years later, being removed from the state highway system on 1951-11-05

SH-77H was returned to active service on 1955-02-07. This time, the highway began at the corner of Porter Avenue and Robinson Street in Norman and traveled north to the previous SH-77H's southern terminus in Hollywood. On 1959-02-27, the Department of Highways assumed maintenance of Sunnylane Road south of S.E. 29th Street (at that time part of SH-3), adding it to SH-77H. This made all of the old SH-77H part of the new SH-77H, and extended the highway's northern terminus into the Oklahoma City suburb of Del City. On 1977-06-06, the highway was extended further north into Del City along Sunnylane Road to Reno Avenue, where it turned west, ending at US-77 (which followed Lincoln Boulevard at the time).

On 1988-12-12, SH-77H was removed from Sunnylane Avenue and Porter Avenue and redesignated one section line east onto Sooner Road and 12th Avenue. At the same time, it was truncated to I-240 in Oklahoma City, and its southern terminus became the 12th Avenue–Classen Boulevard intersection in Norman. Before this rerouting, SH-77H served as SH-37's eastern terminus, but when SH-77H was moved, SH-37 was not extended to meet the new alignment. Thus, SH-37 still ends at Sunnylane Road, one block short of SH-77H.

In April 2009, US-77 was realigned through Norman. The portion of 12th Avenue between Classen Boulevard and Tecumseh Road became part of US-77. This change shortened SH-77H by 4.7 miles (7.6 km), and brought its terminus to the present-day location of the 12th Avenue–Tecumseh Road intersection.

== Junction list ==
| County | Location | mi | km | Destinations | Notes |
|---|---|---|---|---|---|
| Cleveland | Norman | 0.00 | 0.00 | US 77 (Tecumseh Road/12th Avenue NE) | Southern terminus |
| Oklahoma | Okla. City | 9.07 | 14.60 | I-240 / SH-3 | I-240 exit 8. Northern terminus. |
1.000 mi = 1.609 km; 1.000 km = 0.621 mi

== See also ==
- Oklahoma State Highway spurs from U.S. Highways
