= John Kilpatrick =

John Kilpatrick may refer to:

- John Kilpatrick (American athlete) (1889–1960), American ice hockey player, football player, soldier, and sports businessperson
- Jack Kilpatrick (1917–1989), British ice hockey player and Olympic gold medalist
- John Kilpatrick (footballer) (1938–2025), Australian rules footballer
- John Kilpatrick (politician) (fl. 1990), chairman of the Oklahoma Turnpike Authority and namesake of the John Kilpatrick Turnpike
- Johnny Kilpatrick (born 1945), Northern Irish sprinter

== See also ==
- John Kilpatrick Turnpike
