= Oklahoma State Highway 17A =

State highway in Oklahoma, United States

State Highway 17A

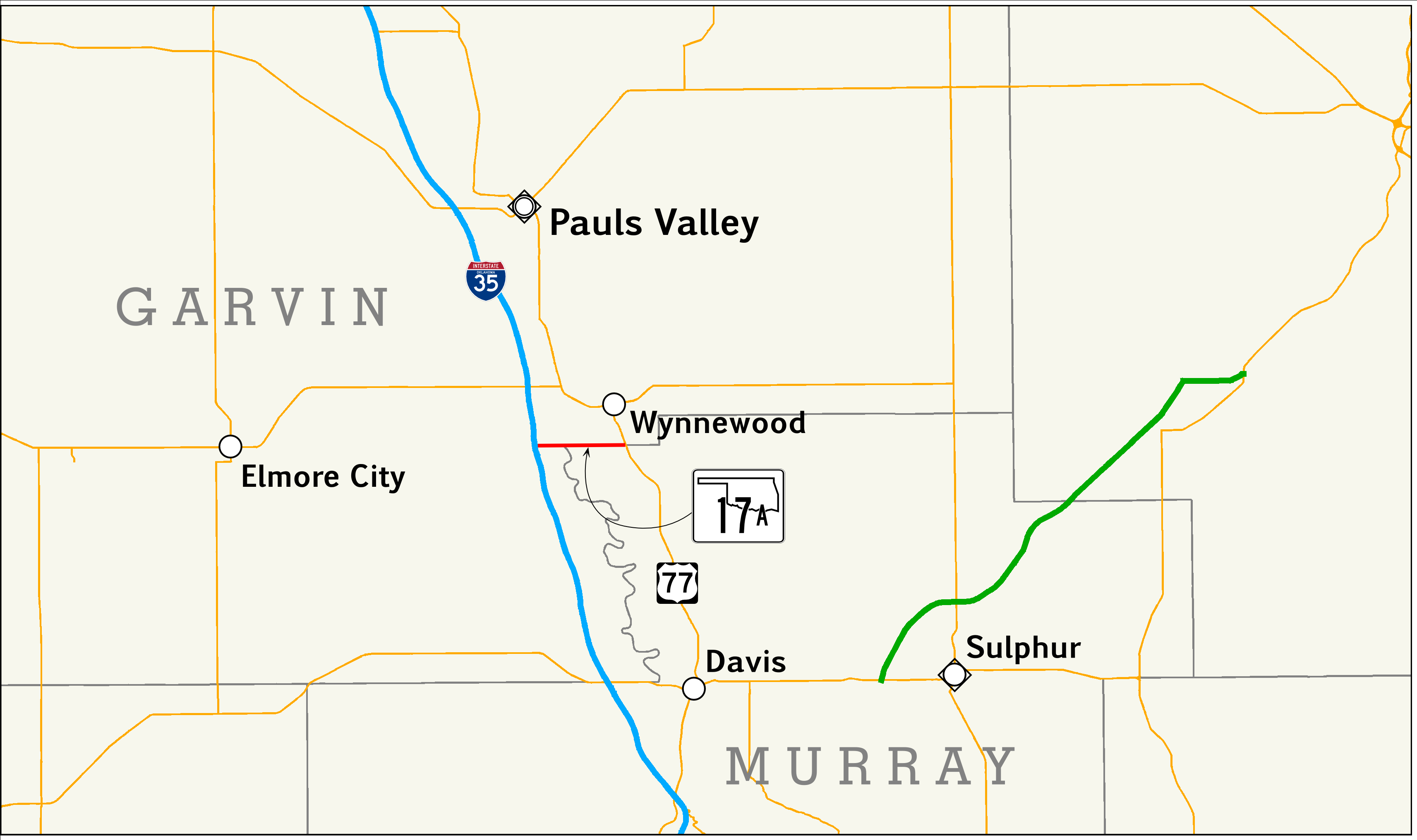

Route information
- Maintained by ODOT
- Length: 3.10 mi (4.99 km)
- Existed: ca. 1982–present

Major junctions
- West end: I-35 near Wynnewood
- East end: US 77 in Wynnewood

Location
- Country: United States
- State: Oklahoma

Highway system
- Oklahoma State Highway System; Interstate; US; State; Turnpikes
← SH-17	→ SH-18

State Highway 17A (SH-17A) is a 3.10-mile (4.99 km) long long state highway in south-central Oklahoma. It connects Interstate 35 (I-35) to U.S. Route 77 (US-77) near Wynnewood. It does not connect to its implied parent, State Highway 17.

SH-17A was established around 1982, and has always had the same route.

== Route description ==
SH-17A begins at I-35 exit 64, a diamond interchange, in unincorporated Garvin County west-southwest of Wynnewood. The highway continues due east from this interchange. SH-17A crosses the Washita River midway through its route. East of the Washita River bridge, the road runs along the Garvin–Murray county line—land north of the highway belongs to Garvin County, while land south of the highway falls into Murray County. The route ends at an intersection with US-77 south of Wynnewood.

== History ==
SH-17A first appeared on the 1983 official state map. The highway's route was identical to the present-day route; no changes have occurred since its commissioning.

== Junction list ==
County	Location	mi	km	Destinations	Notes
Garvin		0.00	0.00	I-35	Western terminus; I-35 exit 64
Garvin–Murray county line		3.10	4.99	US 77	Eastern terminus
1.000 mi = 1.609 km; 1.000 km = 0.621 mi
