= Oklahoma State Highway 142 =

State highway in Oklahoma, United States

State Highway 142

Route information
- Maintained by ODOT
- Length: 4.31 mi (6.94 km)

Major junctions
- West end: I-35 in Ardmore
- US 77 in Ardmore
- East end: SH-199 in Ardmore

Location
- Country: United States
- State: Oklahoma

Highway system
- Oklahoma State Highway System; Interstate; US; State; Turnpikes
← SH-141	→ SH-144

State Highway 142, abbreviated SH-142, is a 4.31-mile (6.94 km) highway in southern Oklahoma. It serves as a short truck route and bypass around the northern and eastern sections of Ardmore.

== Route description ==
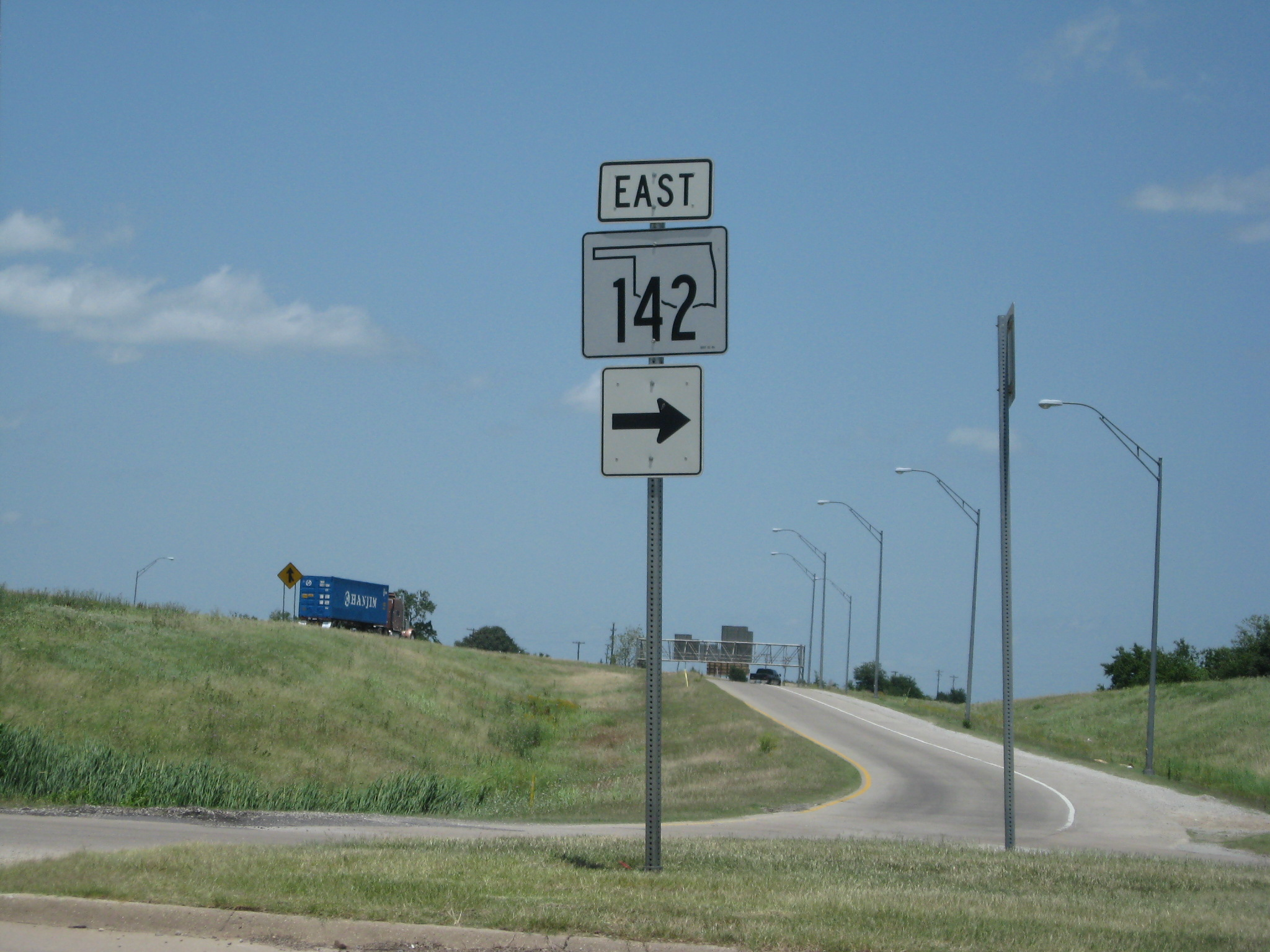
Shield pointing to SH-142 from the I-35 interchange

SH-142 in Ardmore is locally designated as Veterans Boulevard. The highway's western terminus is at I-35 (milemarker 33) in Ardmore. Beginning as a divided highway, it intersects US-77 (locally designated as Commerce) approximately 1 mile (1.6 kilometers) to the east. From there, SH-142 progresses as a two-lane highway approximately 2 miles (3.2 kilometers), passes by Ardmore Middle and High Schools, makes a fairly sharp right turn to the south (near the Valero refinery), and terminates 1 mile (1.6 kilometers) to the south at an intersection with State Highway 199. The roadway (but not the SH-142 designation) continues south as P Street Northeast just to the east of greater Ardmore.

== History ==
SH-142 was originally designated as a state highway in 1958 between US-77 on Ardmore's north side and the former US-70 on the east side of the city which is the current SH-199. In 1969 when I-35 was completed along the west side of Ardmore, SH-142 was extended a mile further west from US-77 to an interchange with the interstate route.

== Junction list ==
The entire route is in Ardmore, Carter County.

mi	km	Destinations	Notes
0.0	0.0	I-35	Western terminus, I-35 exit 33
1.2	1.9	US 77	
4.3	6.9	SH-199	Eastern terminus; roadway continues south at 4-way intersection as P St. NE
1.000 mi = 1.609 km; 1.000 km = 0.621 mi
