= Interstate 44 in Oklahoma =

Highway in Oklahoma

Interstate 44
- I-44 highlighted in red

Route information
- Maintained by ODOT and OTA
- Length: 328.53 mi (528.72 km)
- Existed: 1956–present
- NHS: Entire route

Major junctions
- West end: I-44 / US 277 / US 281 at the Texas state line in Burkburnett, TX
- US 62 / US 277 / US 281 in Lawton; I-240 / SH-3 in Oklahoma City; I-40 in Oklahoma City; I-235 / US 77 in Oklahoma City; I-344 / Kilpatrick Turnpike in Oklahoma City; SH-66 in Oklahoma City; I-35 in Oklahoma City; I-335 / Kickapoo Turnpike in Luther; I-244 / SH-344 in Sapulpa; Creek Turnpike / US 412 in Fair Oaks
- East end: I-44 at the Missouri state line in Joplin, MO

Location
- Country: United States
- State: Oklahoma
- Counties: Cotton, Comanche, Caddo, Grady, McClain, Cleveland, Oklahoma, Lincoln, Creek, Tulsa, Rogers, Mayes, Craig, Ottawa

Highway system
- Interstate Highway System; Main; Auxiliary; Suffixed; Business; Future; Oklahoma State Highway System; Interstate; US; State; Turnpikes
← SH-43	→ SH-44

Interstate 44 (I-44) is an Interstate Highway that runs diagonally through the U.S. state of Oklahoma, spanning from the Texas state line near Wichita Falls, Texas, to the Missouri border near Joplin, Missouri. It connects three of Oklahoma's largest cities: Oklahoma City, Tulsa, and Lawton. Most of I-44 in Oklahoma is a toll road. In southwestern Oklahoma, I-44 is the H. E. Bailey Turnpike and follows a diagonally northeast–southwest direction. From Oklahoma City to Tulsa, I-44 follows the Turner Turnpike. After leaving Tulsa, I-44 follows the Will Rogers Turnpike to the Missouri state line west of Joplin, Missouri. In the Lawton, Oklahoma City, and Tulsa metropolitan areas, I-44 is toll-free. In Oklahoma City, I-44 is also known as the Will Rogers Expressway.

I-44 is paralleled by former U.S. Highway 66 (US 66, now mostly State Highway 66, or SH-66) from Oklahoma City to the Missouri state line.

== Route description ==
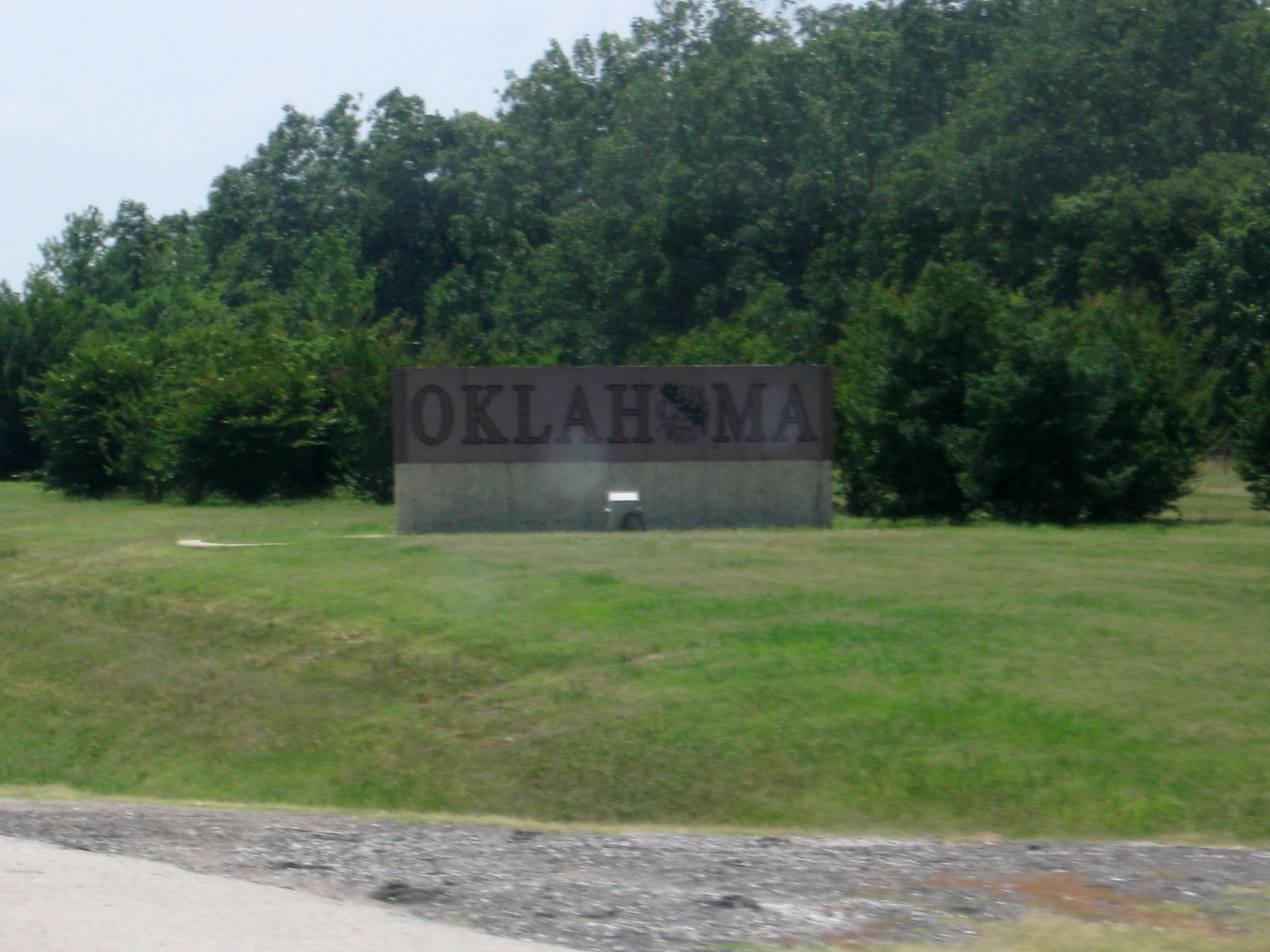
I-44 westbound as it enters Oklahoma near Joplin, Missouri

I-44 crosses the Red River near Burkburnett, Texas. It enters the state on a mostly north–south alignment. The route is toll-free until exit 5, which is the last free exit before the start of the southern section of the H. E. Bailey Turnpike. At exit 30, the tolls end, and I-44 becomes a non-tolled highway again through Lawton and Fort Sill until exit 46. The northern section of the H. E. Bailey Turnpike carries I-44 north, serving Chickasha before ending at US 62 (exit 107) in Newcastle.

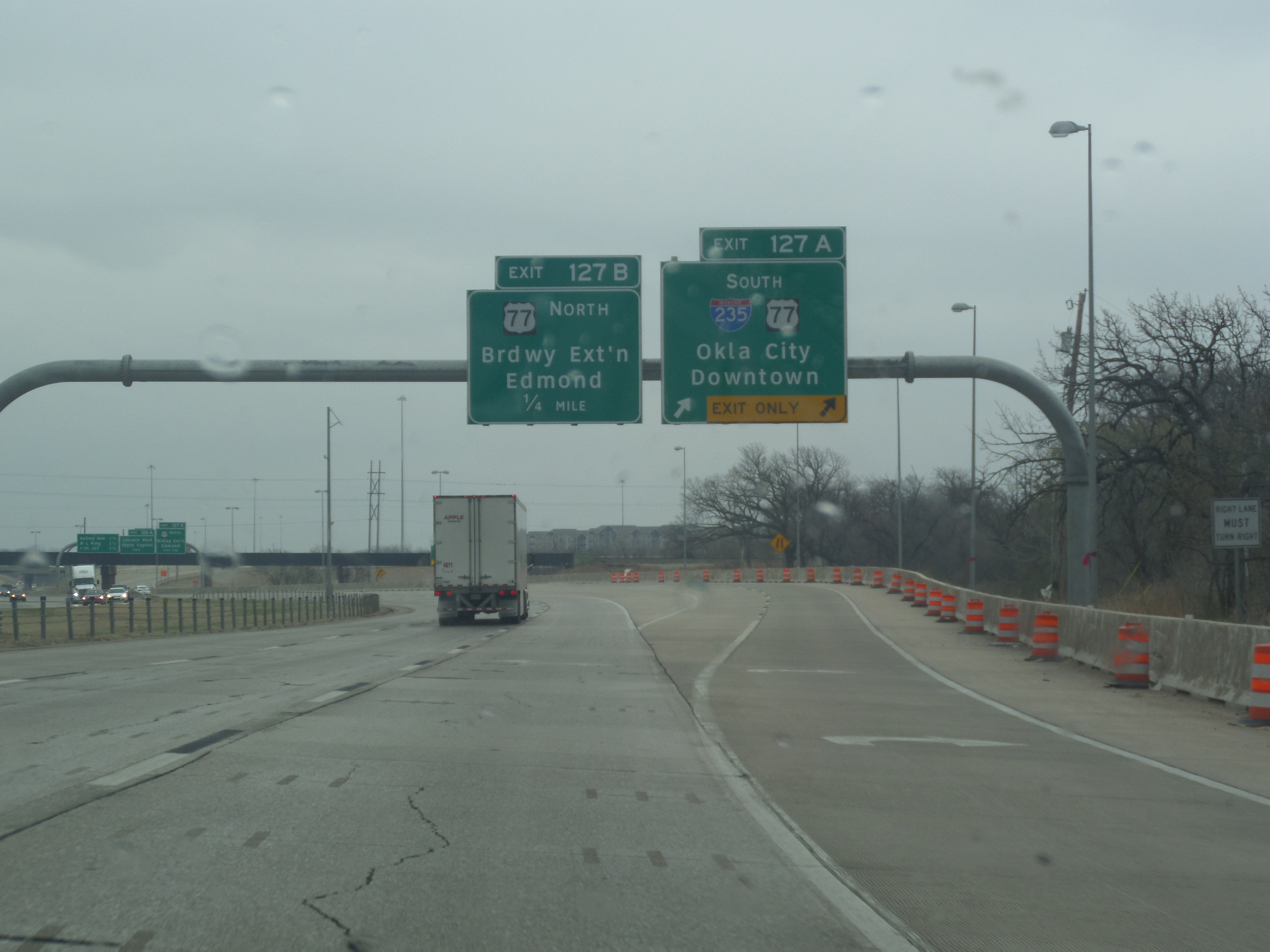
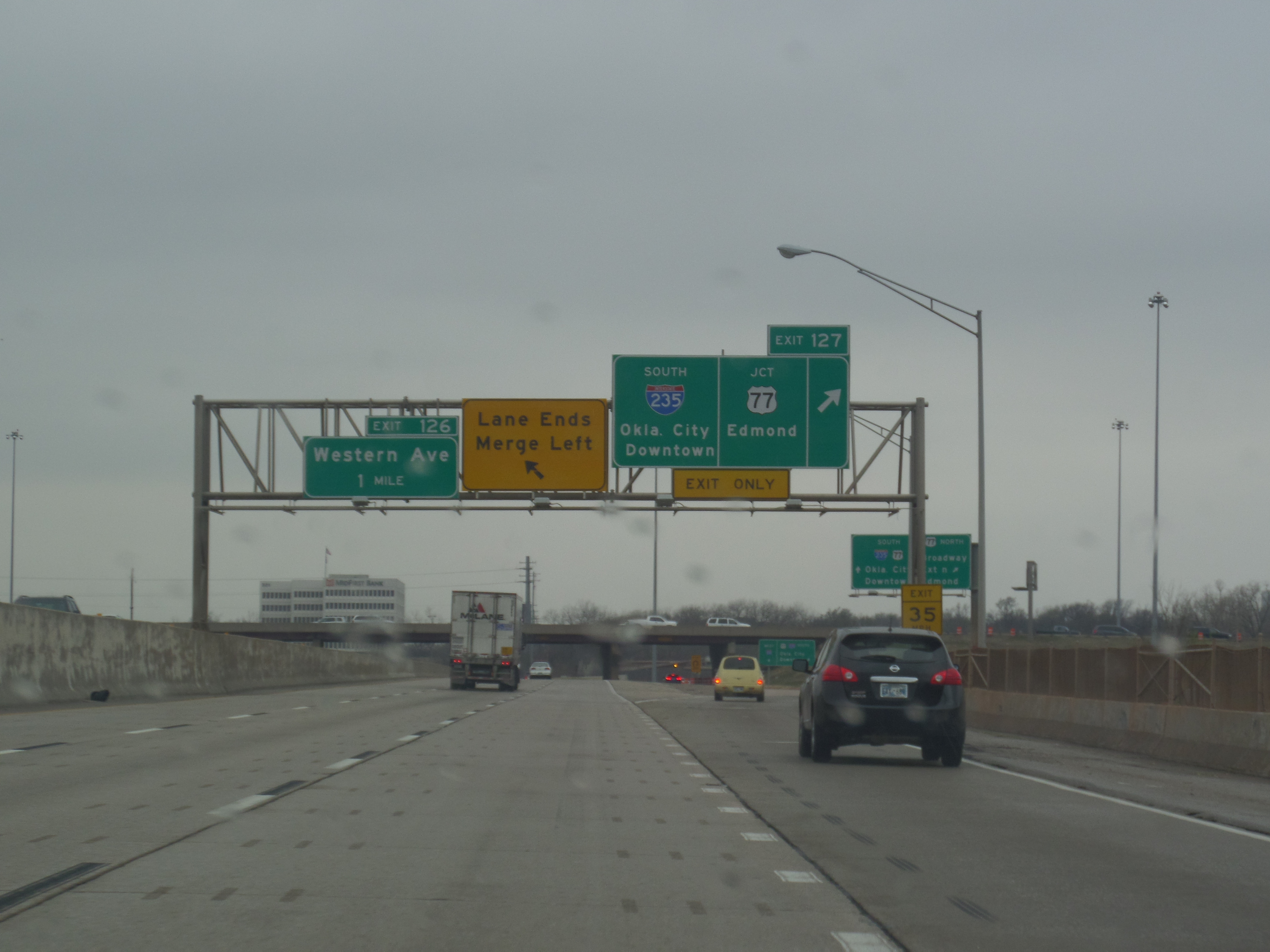
The I-44 and I-235/US-77 junction. The eastbound exits are labeled 127A for southbound I-235 toward Downtown Oklahoma City and 127B for northbound US 77 toward Edmond. However, traveling westbound, both exits are labeled 127. This junction also signifies the northern end for I-235. The exit has since been reconfigured.

From Newcastle, I-44 enters a northeast–southwest alignment and heads north through rural parts of Oklahoma City before it briefly enters a wrong-way concurrency with I-240. It then indirectly serves Will Rogers World Airport by connecting to Southwest 59th Street (which becomes Southwest 54th Street before reaching the airport) and SH-152, the Airport Road freeway. I-44 meets I-40 west of downtown at an interchange sometimes referred to as the Amarillo Junction. I-44 then passes west of the state fairgrounds and continues north to provide access to Bethany and Warr Acres. It then turns more eastbound before reaching a junction with I-235, which also signifies the northern end of I-235, and US 77 also known as the Broadway Extension, which connects Downtown Oklahoma City to Edmond. It then meets and follows a stretch of I-35, which it runs concurrently with until the Turner Turnpike interchange, where it takes an easterly turn again.

I-44 then follows the Turner Turnpike to Sapulpa, where it becomes a non-tolled road after meeting SH-66. I-44 bypasses Downtown Tulsa; I-244 serves the downtown areas. After meeting the Creek Turnpike again on the east side of the city, I-44 becomes a turnpike once again, gaining the Will Rogers Turnpike designation.

The Will Rogers Turnpike section serves many northeast Oklahoma towns, including Claremore, Vinita (where it passes under the world's former largest McDonald's), and Miami. After passing Miami, I-44 crosses the state line into Missouri, about 600 feet (180 m) south of the Kansas–Missouri–Oklahoma tripoint.

== History ==
I-44 was designated through Oklahoma to replace the section of US 66 running from Oklahoma City to Joplin, Missouri. I-44 covered the already-existing Turner and Will Rogers turnpikes, with a western terminus at I-35 in Oklahoma City, the current western terminus of the Turner Turnpike.

I-44 was assigned to the H. E. Bailey Turnpike in 1982, when I-44 was assigned to the western and northern legs of I-240 (then a semi-beltway around Oklahoma City) and the H. E. Bailey Turnpike as part of Oklahoma's "Diamond Jubilee" celebrations. Before I-44 was assigned to it, the freeway connector to the north end of the H. E. Bailey Turnpike was named the Will Rogers Expressway. The non-tolled section through Lawton was the Pioneer Expressway.

Westbound I-44 northeast of Tulsa was affected by a sinkhole found on June 2, 2010. According to the local news, the sinkhole measured 12 feet (3.7 m) wide and 24 feet (7.3 m) long. Traffic was only affected for a short period of time and the roadway has since been reopened.

In early 2000s, southeast of Catoosa, I-44 was redesigned to have an interchange with the eastern expansion of the Creek Turnpike. A 1.5-mile (2.4 km) stretch of the original roadbed remains; it, however, is unused and is not maintained by the Oklahoma Department of Transportation (ODOT) or any of the surrounding cities. In 2012, the only bridge over the abandoned stretch, Pine Street, was removed and replaced with graded fill over the old turnpike.

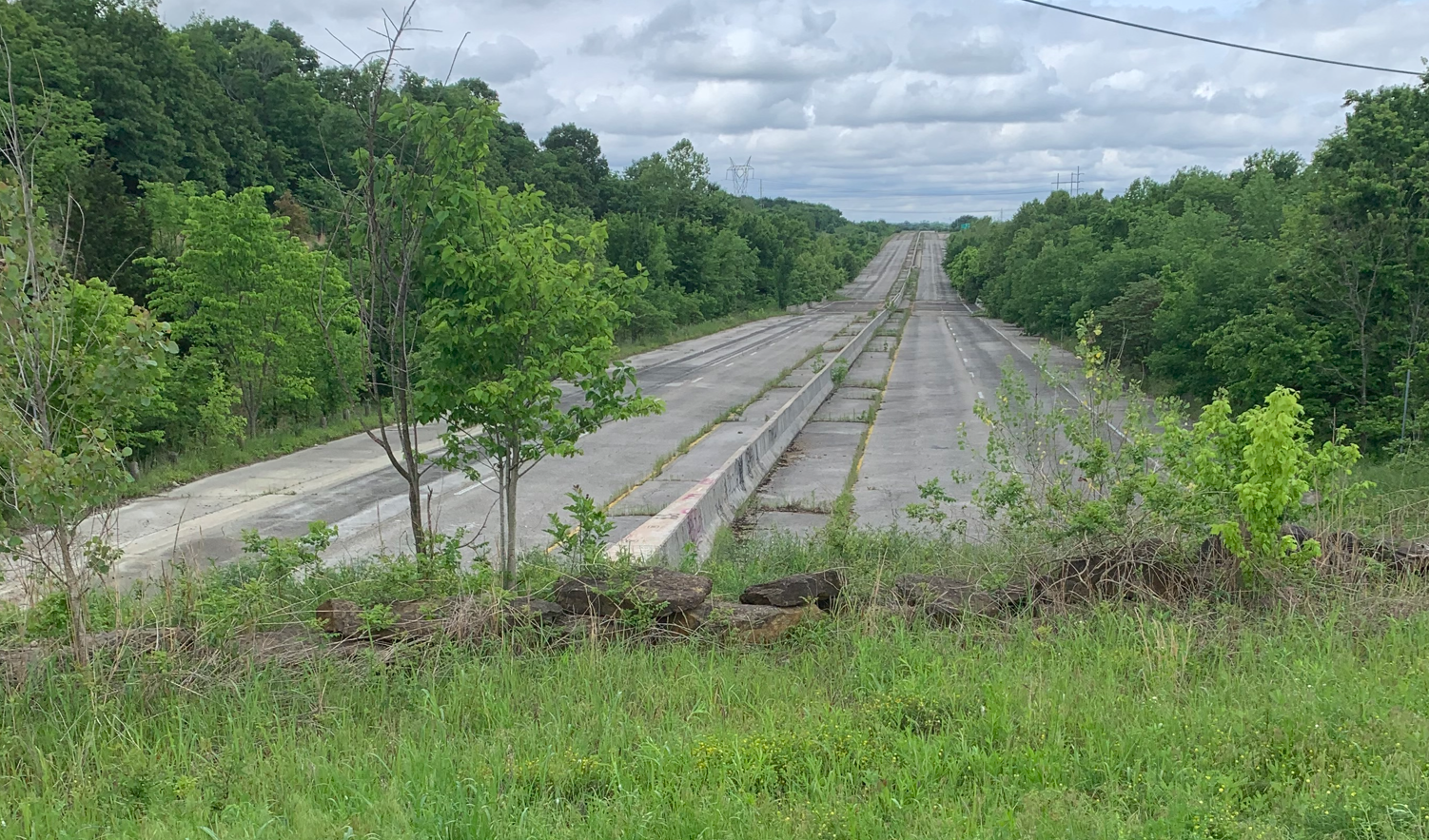
Abandoned route of I-44 (Will Rogers Turnpike) near Catoosa, Oklahoma, looking southwest from Pine Street

As part of a project to widen I-235 and US 77 to accommodate the increase amount of traffic, its interchange with I-44/SH-66 was reconstructed from a cloverleaf interchange to a four-level interchange beginning in 2011. The project eliminated two cloverleaf ramps, widened the other two cloverleaves, and added two new flyover ramps. The four-level interchange was the first of its kind in Oklahoma. The project lasted 11 years and was opened on March 3, 2022. An additional $16 million is being provided to reconstruct the I-44 to US-77 ramp and provide a direct connection to North Lincoln Boulevard. The project is expected to be started in 2023.

I-44 is also known for being crossed by the 1999 Bridge Creek–Moore tornado on May 3, 1999, during the 1999 Oklahoma tornado outbreak, and by the 2013 Moore tornado on May 20, 2013, during the tornado outbreak of May 18–21, 2013.

On February 14, 2021, icy conditions caused a multi-vehicle pileup near Oklahoma City. Both eastbound and westbound lanes were shut down because of the incident.

The H. E. Bailey Turnpike section of I-44 was converted to cashless tolling via PlatePay and PikePass in mid-2022. This was done to remove the need for toll plazas, which were seen as inefficient and prone to traffic accidents. The project, along with a project to rehabilitate the pavement between Lawton to the Oklahoma City metropolitan area, is being done in order to raise the speed limit from 75 to 80 mph (121 to 129 km/h). A similar project was done for I-44 between Lawton and Texas state line.

== Interstate 440 ==
Interstate 440
- Location: Oklahoma City

Interstate 440 (I-440) was the designation given to a stretch of Interstate Highway from I-240 to US 66 in Oklahoma City. It was a part of the original Grand Boulevard that had been built in compliance with Interstate Highway standards. In 1975, the American Association of State Highway and Transportation Officials (AASHTO) approved renumbering I-440 as I-240 to create a single numeric designation for the Oklahoma City loop. In 1982, as part of Oklahoma's "Diamond Jubilee", I-44's western terminus was moved from the I-35/I-44 junction near Edmond, to the Texas state line via the Belle Isle Freeway (part of the recently designated I-240 connecting the former I-440 with I-35); I-240, the H. E. Bailey Turnpike; and the turnpike connector road on the eastern edge of Lawton.

== Exit list ==
County	Location	mi	km	Exit	Destinations	Notes
Cotton	Red River	0.00	0.00		I-44 west / US 277 south / US 281 south – Burkburnett, Wichita Falls	Continuation into Texas
Cotton	Red River	0.00	0.00	President George W. Bush Bridge		
Cotton		1.12	1.80	1	SH-36 – Grandfield	
Cotton		5.29	8.51	5	US 277 / US 281 north / US 70 – Randlett	Eastern end of US-277/US-281 concurrency
Cotton	Walters	19.78	31.83	20	SH-5 / US 277 / US 281 – Walters	Walters toll plaza is located at this interchange
Comanche		29.83	48.01	30	SH-36 west / US 277 south / US 281 south – Geronimo, Faxon, Frederick	Western end of US-277/US-281 concurrency
Comanche	Lawton	33.19	53.41	33	US 281 Bus. north (11th Street)	
Comanche	Lawton	36.47	58.69	36A	SH-7 east (Lee Boulevard) – Duncan	Signed as exits 36A (east) and 36B (west) westbound
Comanche	Lawton	37.48	60.32	37	Gore Boulevard	
Comanche	Lawton	38.50	61.96	39B	US 281 Bus. south – Lawton	Westbound exit and eastbound entrance
Comanche	Lawton	38.71	62.30	39A	Cache Road – Lawton Business District	Signed as exit 38 eastbound
Comanche	Lawton	39.77	64.00	40	US 62 west (Rogers Lane) – Cache, Altus	Split into exits 40A (east) and 40B (west); exit 40A signed as exit 40C westbound; western end of US-62 concurrency
Comanche	Lawton	41.35	66.55	41	Fort Sill Key Gate	Department of Defense ID required
Comanche		45.02	72.45	45	SH-49 – Carnegie, Medicine Park	
Comanche		46.39	74.66	46	US 62 east / US 277 / US 281 north – Elgin, Apache, Anadarko	Eastbound exit and westbound entrance; eastern end of US-62/US-277/US-281 concurrency
Comanche	Elgin	52.78	84.94	53	US 277 – Fletcher, Elgin, Sterling	Toll on eastbound exit and westbound entrance
Comanche		61.52	99.01	62	Fletcher, Cyril, Sterling	Westbound exit and eastbound entrance; future full interchange
Caddo	No major junctions					
Grady				Chickasha toll plaza		
Grady		72	116	72	US 277 / SH-19 – Cement	Future interchange
Grady	Chickasha	80.10	128.91	80	US 81 (US-277) – Duncan, Chickasha	
Grady	Chickasha	82.64	133.00	83	US 62 (US-277) – Chickasha, Anadarko	
Grady		86	138	86	SH-92	Future interchange; westbound exit and eastbound entrance
Grady		93	150	93	Amber	Future interchange
Grady				Newcastle toll plaza		
Grady		98.70	158.84	—	SH-4 Toll south – Blanchard, Norman, H. E. Bailey Norman Spur	Cloverleaf interchange; exit numbers not displayed
Grady		98.70	158.84	—	SH-4 north – Yukon, Mustang, Tuttle	Cloverleaf interchange; exit numbers not displayed
McClain	Newcastle	106.59	171.54	107	US 62 west / US 277 begins – Newcastle	Western end of US-62 concurrency
McClain	Newcastle	107.37	172.80	108	SH-37 west – Tuttle	Western end of SH-37 concurrency
McClain	Newcastle	107.89	173.63	108A	Frontage Road	Westbound exit and eastbound entrance
Cleveland	Oklahoma City	109.33	175.95	109	SW 149th Street	
Cleveland	Oklahoma City	110.37	177.62	110	SH-37 east (SW 134th Street) – Moore	Eastern end of SH-37 concurrency
Cleveland	Oklahoma City	111.43	179.33	111	SW 119th Street	
Cleveland	Oklahoma City	112.49	181.04	112	SW 104th Street	
Oklahoma	Oklahoma City	113.51	182.68	113	SW 89th Street	
Oklahoma	Oklahoma City	114.52	184.30	114	SW 74th Street	
Oklahoma	Oklahoma City	114.84	184.82	115	I-240 / US 62 east / SH-3	Eastern end of US-62 and I-240 concurrency; western end of SH-3 concurrency; I-240 exit 7B; signed as exits 115A (I-240 east), 115B (SW 59th Street), and 115C (I-240 west)
Oklahoma	Oklahoma City	116.36	187.26	—	I-240 west (Airport Road)	Western end of I-240 concurrency; former SH-152
Oklahoma	Oklahoma City	116.89	188.12	117A	SW 44th Street	Signed as exit 117B westbound
Oklahoma	Oklahoma City	117.74	189.48	118	SW 29th Street	
Oklahoma	Oklahoma City	118.77	191.14	119	SW 15th Street	
Oklahoma	Oklahoma City	119.55	192.40	120	I-40 – Amarillo, Fort Smith	Signed as exits 120A (west) and 120B (east); I-40 exits 147A-B
Oklahoma	Oklahoma City	120.84	194.47	121	NW 10th Street – Fair Park	Signed as exits 121A (east) and 121B (west)
Oklahoma	Oklahoma City	121.87	196.13	122	NW 23rd Street	
Oklahoma	Oklahoma City	122.90	197.79	123A	NW 36th Street	Eastbound exit and westbound entrance
Oklahoma	Oklahoma City	123.16	198.21	—	SH-3 west / SH-74 north (Lake Hefner Parkway)	Eastern end of SH-3 concurrency; eastbound exit and westbound entrance; westbound exit and eastbound entrance is part of exit 123B.
Oklahoma	Oklahoma City	123.26	198.37	123B	SH-66 west – Warr Acres, Bethany	Western end of SH-66 concurrency
Oklahoma	Oklahoma City	123.66	199.01	124	N. May Avenue	No westbound entrance
Oklahoma	Oklahoma City	124.75	200.77	125A	N. Penn Avenue	
Oklahoma	Oklahoma City	125.38	201.78	125C	Northwest Expressway	No eastbound exit
Oklahoma	Oklahoma City	125.86	202.55	125B	Classen Boulevard	No westbound entrance
Oklahoma	Oklahoma City	126.16– 126.38	203.03– 203.39	126	Western Avenue	Westbound exits onto NW Grand Blvd
Oklahoma	Oklahoma City	127.11	204.56	127A	I-235 / US 77 south – Oklahoma City, Downtown	
Oklahoma	Oklahoma City	127.11	204.56	127B	US 77 north – Edmond	Also includes unnumbered exit to NW 63rd Street
Oklahoma	Oklahoma City	127.66	205.45	128A	Lincoln Boulevard – State Capitol	
Oklahoma	Oklahoma City	128.36	206.58	128B	Kelley Avenue	
Oklahoma	Oklahoma City	129.43	208.30	129	M.L. King Avenue	
Oklahoma	Oklahoma City	130.39	209.84	130	I-35 south to I-40 – Oklahoma City, Dallas	Western end of I-35 concurrency; westbound uses I-35 numbering (exit 133) due to concurrency
Oklahoma	Oklahoma City	131.18	211.11	134	Wilshire Boulevard	Exit numbers follow I-35
Oklahoma	Oklahoma City	132.22	212.79	135	Britton Road	Exit numbers follow I-35
Oklahoma	Oklahoma City	133.35	214.61	136	Hefner Road	Exit numbers follow I-35
Oklahoma	Oklahoma City	143.33	230.67	137	NE 122nd Street	Exit numbers follow I-35
Oklahoma	Oklahoma City	134.92	217.13	138A	I-35 north (SH-66 east)	Eastern end of I-35/SH-66 concurrency; westbound exit unnumbered and includes unnumbered Sooner road exit (Westbound exit and eastbound entrance), Southbound exit and Northbound entrance available via I-35 Exit 138C
Oklahoma	Oklahoma City	135.12	217.45	—	I-344 Toll west (Kilpatrick Turnpike)	Eastbound exit via I-35 Exit 138B
Oklahoma	Oklahoma City			139	Post Road	Proposed interchange on the existing turnpike
Oklahoma	Oklahoma City	146.29	235.43	146	Luther / Jones	
Oklahoma	Luther			149	I-335 Toll south (Kickapoo Turnpike)	Kickapoo Tpk. exits 149A-B
Lincoln				155	SH-102 – Wellston	Proposed interchange on the existing turnpike
Lincoln	Wellston	157.13	252.88	158	SH-66 – Wellston	
Lincoln	Chandler	166.38	267.76	166	SH-18 – Chandler, Cushing	
Lincoln				173	Davenport	Proposed interchange on the existing turnpike
Lincoln	Stroud	179.12	288.27	179	US 377 south / SH-99 – Stroud, Drumright	Northern terminus of US 377
Creek				Toll plaza		
Creek				188	Depew	Proposed interchange on the existing turnpike
Creek	Bristow	196.30	315.91	196	SH-48 – Bristow, Lake Keystone	
Creek		203	327	203	SH-66 – Kellyville	
Creek	Sapulpa	210.61	338.94	211	SH-33 / SH-66 – Drumright, Kellyville	
Creek	Sapulpa	215.35	346.57	215	SH-97 – Sapulpa, Sand Springs	
Creek	Sapulpa	216.99	349.21	218A	SH-66 – Sapulpa	Eastbound exit and westbound entrance
Creek	Sapulpa	217.36	349.81	218B	Creek Turnpike east – Joplin, Jenks, Broken Arrow	Eastbound exit and westbound entrance
Creek–Tulsa county line	Sapulpa	221.60	356.63	221	SH-66 west – Bristow, Sapulpa	Westbound exit and eastbound entrance, west end of SH-66 overlap
Tulsa	Sapulpa	221.93	357.16	222A	49th West Avenue	
Tulsa	Sapulpa	222.08	357.40	222B	55th Place	Eastbound exit only
Tulsa	Sapulpa	222.08	357.40	222C	56th Street	Westbound exit only
Tulsa	Sapulpa	222.45– 222.60	358.00– 358.24	223A	I-244 east / SH-344 north (Gilcrease Expressway) – Downtown Tulsa	Signed as exits 223A (east) and 223B (north) westbound; western terminus and exit 1A on I-244; southern terminus of SH-344
Tulsa	Tulsa	223.02	358.92	223C	33rd West Avenue	
Tulsa	Tulsa	224.02	360.53	224	Union Avenue	C/D lanes provide access to US-75 and Elwood Ave; No Eastbound Entrance.
Tulsa	Tulsa	224.30	360.98	224	US 75 – Okmulgee, Bartlesville	Cloverleaf interchange; accessible to and from C/D lanes
Tulsa	Tulsa	224.76	361.72	225	Elwood Avenue	Eastbound access is part of exit 224 accessible from C/D lanes originating at Union Ave. exit; No westbound entrance.
Tulsa	Tulsa	225.54	362.97	226A	Riverside Drive	Eastbound access via exit 226
Tulsa	Tulsa	226.03	363.76	226B	Peoria Avenue	Signed as exit 226 eastbound
Tulsa	Tulsa	227.03	365.37	227	Lewis Avenue	
Tulsa	Tulsa	228.03	366.98	228	E. 51st Street / Harvard Avenue	
Tulsa	Tulsa	229.11	368.72	229	Yale Avenue	
Tulsa	Tulsa	230.06	370.25	230	E. 41st Street / Sheridan Road	
Tulsa	Tulsa	231.02	371.79	231	US 64 / SH-51 to US 169 – Muskogee, Broken Arrow, Sand Springs	
Tulsa	Tulsa	231.58	372.69	232	E. 31st Street / Memorial Drive	Eastbound exit and westbound entrance accessible from C/D lanes originating from US-64/SH-151/US-169 exit.
Tulsa	Tulsa	233.11	375.15	233	E. 21st Street	Signed as exit 233B westbound, no eastbound entrance.
Tulsa	Tulsa	233.73	376.15	234A	US 169 – Owasso, Broken Arrow	No eastbound exit to US-169 south
Tulsa	Tulsa	234.39	377.21	234B	Garnett Road	Eastbound exit and westbound entrance
Tulsa	Tulsa	234.63	377.60	235	E. 11th Street	No westbound entrance
Tulsa	Tulsa	235.72	379.35	236	129th East Avenue	
Tulsa	Tulsa	236.15	380.05	236B	I-244 / US 412 west – Sand Springs, Enid	Westbound exit and eastbound entrance; western end of US-412 concurrency; eastern terminus of I-244
Tulsa–Rogers county line	Tulsa–Catoosa line	237.78	382.67	238	161st East Avenue	
Tulsa–Rogers county line	Tulsa–Catoosa line	239.79	385.90	240	SH-167 north (193rd East Avenue)	
Wagoner–Rogers county line	Catoosa	240.25	386.64	241	SH-66 east – Claremore, Catoosa	No eastbound entrance; east end of SH-66 overlap; no exit number westbound
Wagoner–Rogers county line	Fair Oaks	241.70	388.98	33A-34	US 412 east / Creek Turnpike west – Oklahoma City, Chouteau, Siloam Springs	East end of US-412 overlap; signed as exits 33A (east) and 34 (west); no exit nos. eastbound
Rogers		242.40	390.10	35	E. Pine Street	Westbound exit and eastbound entrance; exit no. corresponds to Creek Turnpike; future full interchange
Rogers	Verdigris	248.24	399.50	248	SH-266 west – Port of Catoosa, Claremore	
Rogers	Claremore			252	SH-20 (Flint Road) – Claremore	Interchange opened on March 13, 2025
Rogers	Claremore	254.17	409.05	255	SH-20 – Pryor, Claremore	
Mayes		269.64	433.94	269	SH-28 – Adair, Chelsea, South Grand Lake	Eastbound exit and westbound entrance; future full interchange
Craig	Big Cabin	282.61	454.82	283	US 69 – Big Cabin	
Craig				Toll plaza		
Craig	Vinita			Service plaza		
Craig		289.27	465.53	289	US 60 (US-69) to SH-66 – Vinita	
Ottawa		301.94	485.93	302	US 59 / US 60 (US-69) – Fairland, Grove, Afton	
Ottawa	Miami	313.19	504.03	313	SH-10 – Miami	
Ottawa		329.36	530.05		I-44 east – Joplin, Springfield	Continuation into Missouri
1.000 mi = 1.609 km; 1.000 km = 0.621 mi: Concurrency terminus; Incomplete access; Tolled; Unopened

Interstate 44
Previous state: Texas	Oklahoma	Next state: Missouri
