= U.S. Route 77 in Oklahoma =

Section of U.S. Highway in Oklahoma, United States

U.S. Highway 77
- US 77 highlighted in red

Route information
- Maintained by ODOT
- Length: 267.21 mi (430.03 km)

Major junctions
- South end: I-35 / US 77 at the Texas state line near Thackerville
- US 70 in Ardmore; I-35 in Norman; I-35 / I-40 / US 62 / US 270 in Oklahoma City; I-235 in Oklahoma City; I-44 in Oklahoma City; I-344 / Kilpatrick Turnpike in Oklahoma City; US 64 in Perry; Future I-42 / US 412 / Cimarron Turnpike near Perry; US 60 in Tonkawa
- North end: US-77 at the Kansas state line near Newkirk

Location
- Country: United States
- State: Oklahoma
- Counties: Love, Carter, Murray, Garvin, McClain, Cleveland, Oklahoma, Logan, Noble, Kay

Highway system
- United States Numbered Highway System; List; Special; Divided; Oklahoma State Highway System; Interstate; US; State; Turnpikes
← SH-76	→ SH-77H

U.S. Highway 77 (US-77) in Oklahoma is a 267.21-mile-long (430.03 km) U.S. Highway in the U.S. state of Oklahoma. It travels from south to north, paralleling Interstate 35 (I-35), connecting Texas to Kansas through the central part of the state. It travels through many major cities, including Ardmore, Oklahoma City and its suburbs, Guthrie, and Ponca City. It has four lettered spur routes.

US-77 was the first highway in Oklahoma to be paved entirely across the state from state line to state line. It has been a paved roadway since 1930.

== Route description ==
US-77 enters the state along with I-35 but splits off at the first exit in Oklahoma. Four miles later, it passes through Thackerville. It junctions with State Highway 32 on the west side of Marietta.

North of Marietta, US-77 passes to the west of Lake Murray and its state park. It then enters Carter County and Ardmore, where it is named Commerce Street through the city limits over a four-lane divided thoroughfare that includes frontage roads on each side from just south of SH-199 (West Broadway) to NW 12th Street much like a freeway or expressway, though all intersections on Commerce are at-grade.

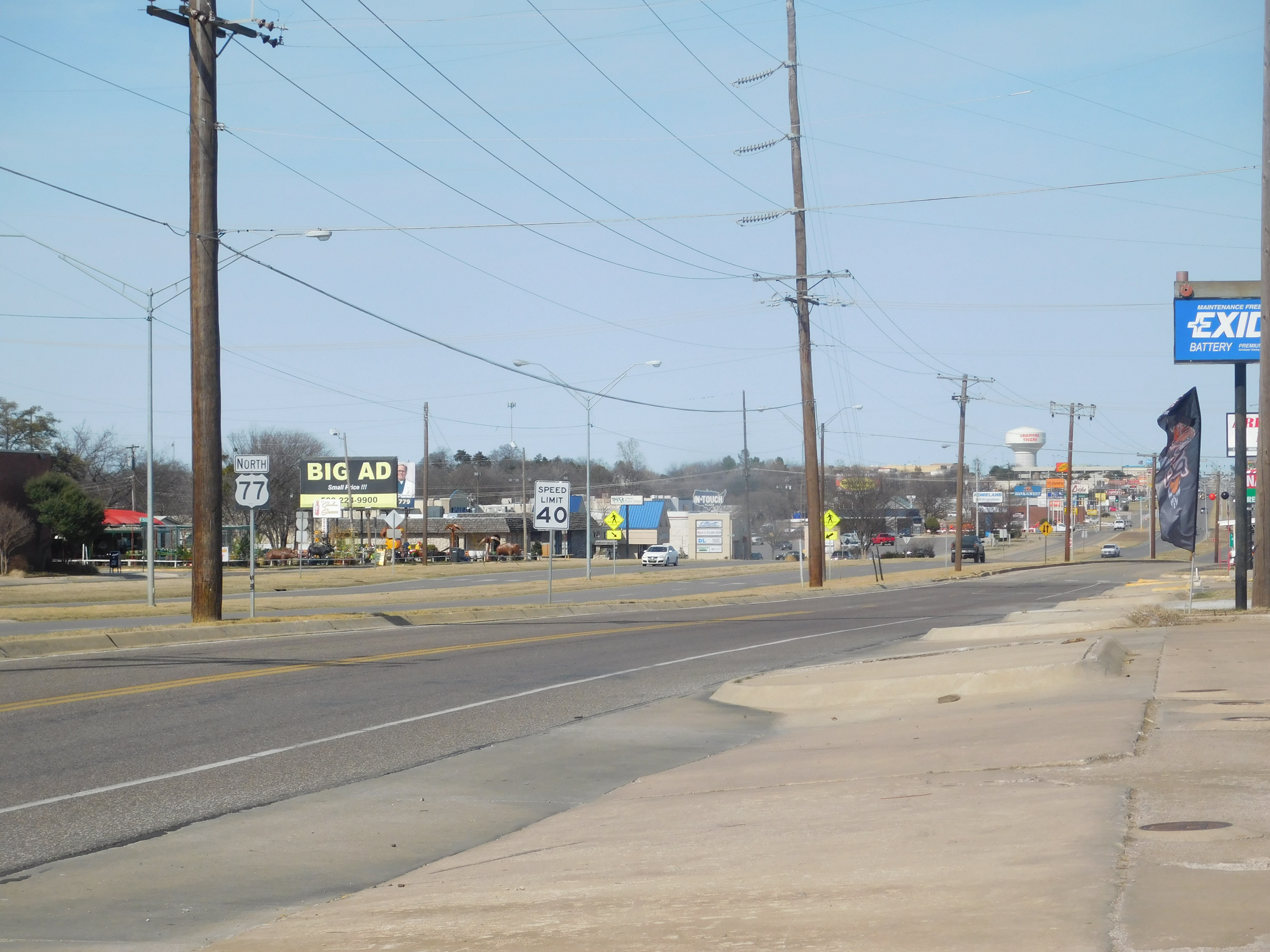
US 77 in Ardmore, north of SH-199

North of Ardmore, US-77 continues as a four-lane divided highway to Springer. It crosses State Highway 53 south of Springer. North of Springer, US-77 reverts to a two-lane highway and enters the Arbuckle Mountains, providing access to Turner Falls and having some hairpin curves over a section of roadway paved and constructed in the 1920s using prison labor from the Oklahoma State Penitentiary in McAlester. It then passes through Davis (where it has a brief concurrency with State Highway 7. North of Davis, it passes through unincorporated Joy and passes through Wynnewood, where it carries State Highway 29. It then passes through Pauls Valley, Paoli, and Wayne. Next, it enters Purcell, where it concurs with State Highway 39 and 74.

US-77 and SH-39 split off SH-74 to head eastbound along Washington St. in downtown Purcell. Together, they cross the James C. Nance Memorial Bridge into Lexington, where SH-39 splits off. It then heads through Slaughterville and Noble before entering Norman.

A major reconstruction on US-77 through Norman completed in April 2009 has realigned US-77 to 12th Avenue East from SH-9 to Tecumseh Road, then west along Tecumseh Road to Flood Avenue, and finally north along Flood Avenue until it merges onto Northbound Interstate-35, the interchange of US-77 and Interstate-35 was modernized and upgraded as part of the widening to six lanes of Interstate-35 to Norman. It formerly ran through downtown Norman along Classen Boulevard, Porter Avenue then west along Robinson Street to Flood Avenue. The north–south section of the new alignment along 12th Avenue was previously flagged as SH-77H.

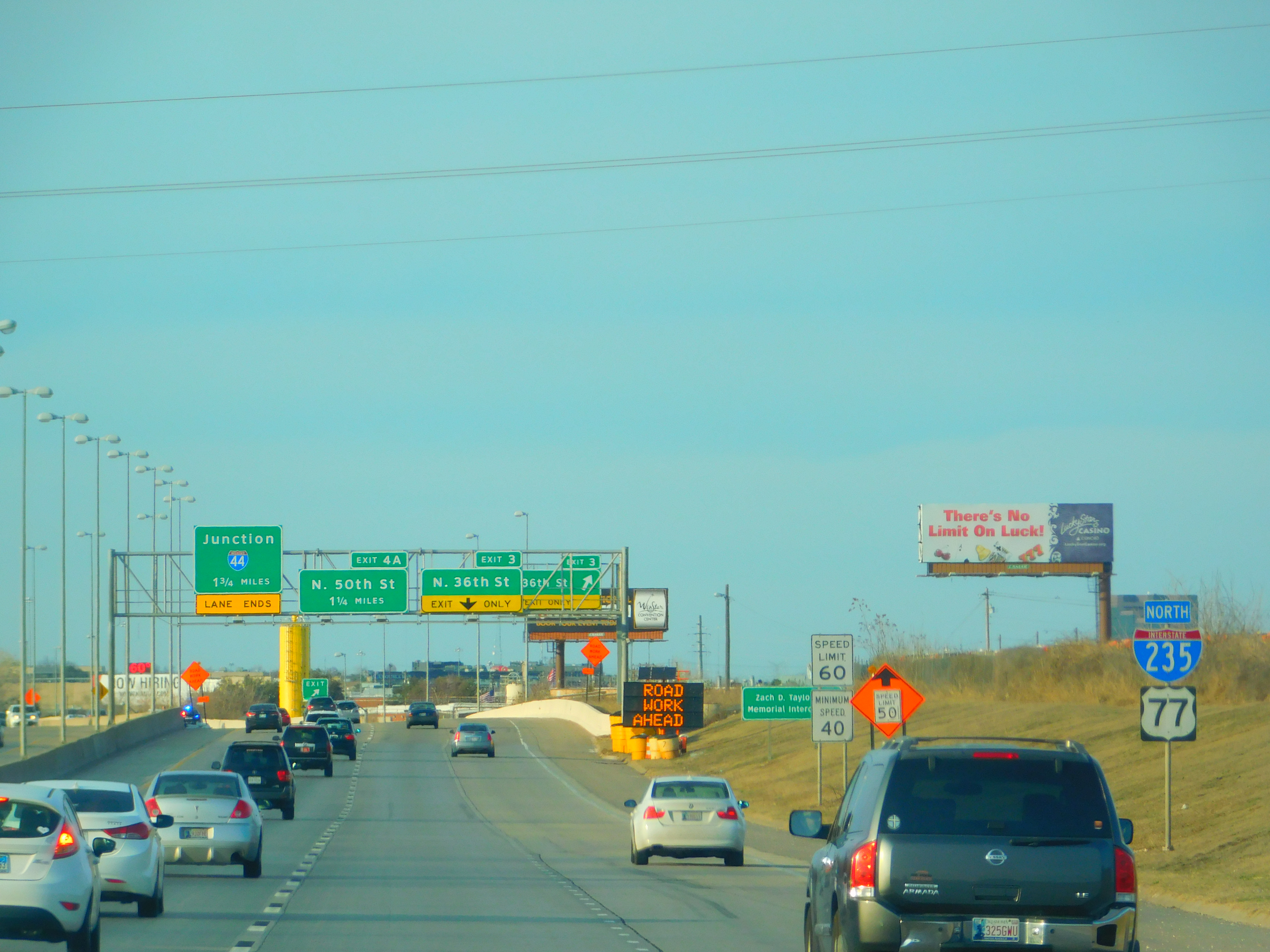
US 77 north, concurrent with I-235, in Oklahoma City

I-35 and US-77 remain together until the Fort Smith Junction in downtown Oklahoma City, where it transfers onto Interstate 235. At Interstate 44, I-235 ends, but US-77 continues northbound as a freeway, called the Broadway Extension. The Broadway Extension is a major freeway linking the downtown area to Edmond. In Edmond, it heads east to meet I-35, which it joins again until Guthrie, where it splits off.

In Guthrie, US-77 meets State Highway 33. It continues northbound to serve as the eastern terminus of State Highway 164 and turns eastward toward Perry. After passing the north end of State Highway 86, it turns back northward and has a half-interchange with the Cimarron Turnpike. It then carries State Highway 15 for four miles (6.4 km). At Tonkawa, it begins a wrong-way concurrency with U.S. Highway 177 and U.S. Highway 60. It splits off to the north to head through Ponca City and Newkirk, before crossing over the Kansas line towards Arkansas City, Kansas.

== History ==
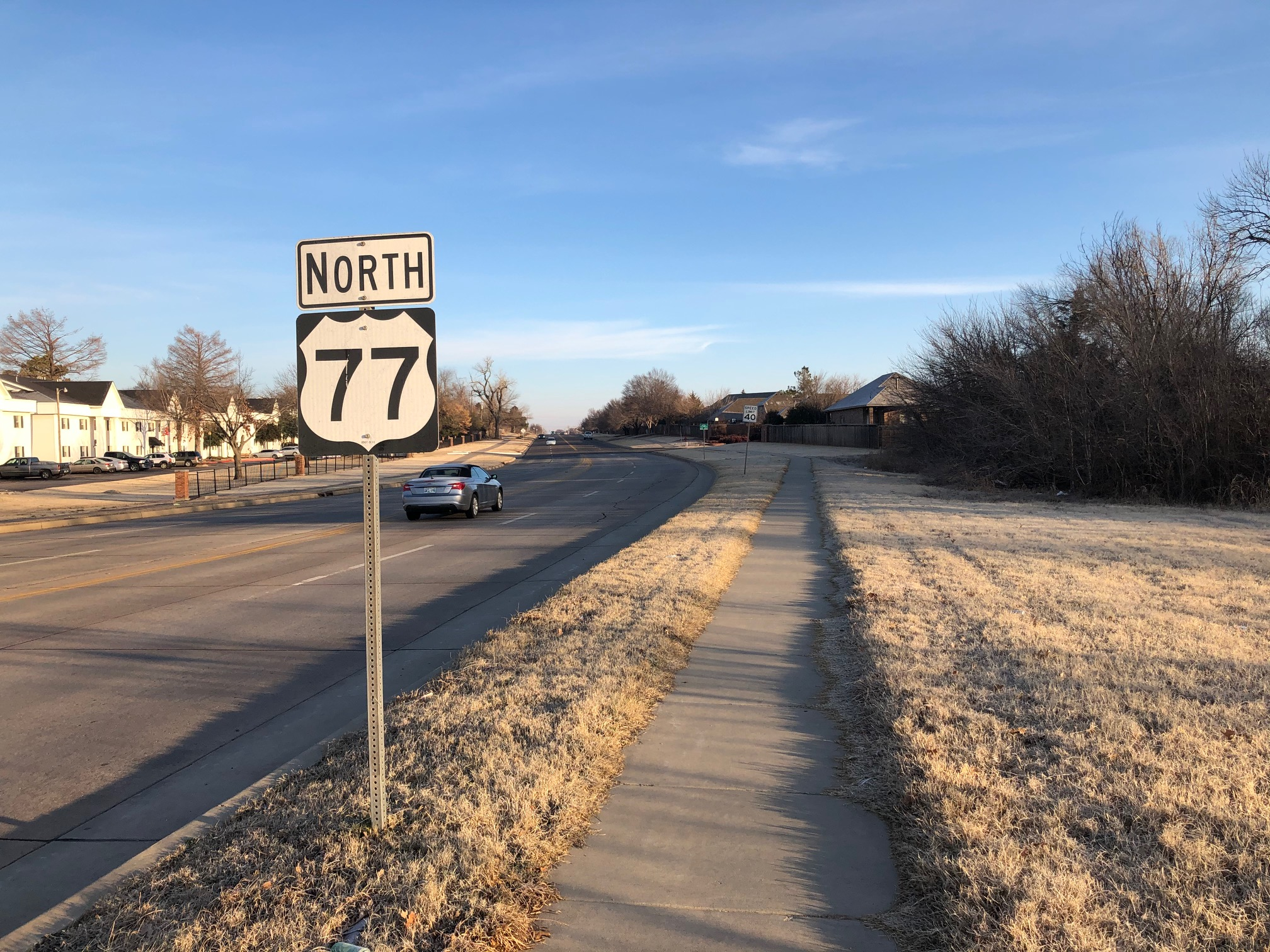
US 77 in Norman, along 12th Avenue, which was previously part of OK-77H

US-77 has followed Commerce entirely through the Ardmore city limits since 1950 when that thoroughfare was built in its current form as an early bypass along what was then Ardmore's west side to provide a straighter route for through traffic and relieve downtown traffic congestion, replacing the original US-77 route in Ardmore which followed Broadway east from Commerce to "E" Street, north on "E" Street to 12th and west on 12th back to Commerce before proceeding north on Commerce out of the city.

Beginning in the mid-1990s, a massive Capital Improvement Project program was started to widen and reconstruct US-77 between Edmond on the Broadway Extension and the North 36th Street exit on I-235. The project included widening to six or eight lanes, reconfiguring several interchanges, and installing a new BNSF Railway bridge over I-235.

The interchange with I-44/SH-66 was reconstructed from a cloverleaf interchange to a four-level interchange that eliminated two cloverleaf ramps. The other two cloverleafs were widened and reconstructed and two new flyover ramps were added. The four-level interchange is the first of its kind in Oklahoma. The $105 million project lasted three years and was opened on March 3, 2022. An additional $16 million is being provided to reconstruct the I-44 to US-77 ramp and provide a direct connection to North Lincoln Boulevard. The project is expected to be started in 2023.

== Spurs ==
=== SH-153 ===
State Highway 153
- Location: Thackerville
- Length: 0.50 mi (800 m)

State Highway 153 (abbreviated SH-153) is a short state highway in Love County, Oklahoma. At 0.50 miles (0.80 km), it is the shortest non-suffixed state highway in Oklahoma. SH-153 connects U.S. Highway 77 in Thackerville, Oklahoma to Interstate 35 at mile marker 5. It has no lettered spur routes.

Browse numbered routes
← SH-152	SH-153	→ SH-156

=== SH-77C ===
State Highway 77C
- Location: Purcell
- Length: 0.47 mi (760 m)

State Highway 77C is an unsigned route through Purcell. It heads east on Main Street, then turns north onto Canadian Avenue. That is the road the eastern terminus of the highway is on, which is at US-77/SH-39.

=== SH-77D ===
State Highway 77D
- Location: Murray County
- Length: 10.30 mi (16.58 km)

State Highway 77D is a Y-shaped spur route through the Turner Falls area. The main branch of SH-77D begins at US-77 south of Davis, north of I-35. It crosses under I-35 twice before ending at the Falls Creek Baptist Conference Center. It also provides access to Price Falls.

=== SH-77H ===
State Highway 77H
- Location: Norman–Oklahoma City
- Length: 9.07 mi (14.60 km)

State Highway 77H begins at Tecumseh Road and follows 12th Avenue N.E. through Norman, then turns into Sooner Road in Moore. The highway ends at I-240 in Oklahoma City.

=== SH-77S ===
State Highway 77S
- Location: Lake Murray State Park and vicinity
- Length: 30.04 mi (48.34 km)

State Highway 77S lies in Love County and Carter County, serving Lake Murray. The main segment of the highway begins in Love County at SH-32, east of Marietta. It runs north towards Lake Murray then traverses the western shore of the lake. After entering Carter County, it intersects US-70 before reaching its northern terminus in Ardmore.

The highway has two spurs, each one also signed as SH-77S. The eastern spur begins at Love County, near the south shores of Lake Murray. It hugs the eastern shore of the lake while heading north, entering Carter County and reaching its northern terminus at US-70.

The western spur (Lodge Road) runs mostly along the Love–Carter county line, connecting the main SH-77S to I-35 at exit 24, serving as the main entrance to Lake Murray State Park.

==== Main route ====
County	Location	mi	km	Destinations	Notes
Love		0.00	0.00	SH-32 – Durant, Marietta	Southern terminus
Love	Lake Murray SP	7.1	11.4	SH-77S (eastern spur) north	Southern terminus of eastern spur
Carter	Lake Murray SP	10.8	17.4	SH-77S (western spur) west (Lodge Road)	Eastern terminus of western spur
Carter	Lake Murray SP	15.9	25.6	US 70 – Madill	
Carter	Ardmore	17.6	28.3	10th Avenue SE	Northern terminus; road continues as Lake Murray Drive
1.000 mi = 1.609 km; 1.000 km = 0.621 mi

==== Eastern spur ====
The entire route is in Lake Murray State Park.

County	mi	km	Destinations	Notes
Love	0.00	0.00	SH-77S – Lodge, Marietta	Southern terminus; road continues north as SH-77S (main)
Carter	9.9	15.9	US 70 – Madill	Northern terminus
1.000 mi = 1.609 km; 1.000 km = 0.621 mi

==== Western spur ====
County	Location	mi	km	Destinations	Notes
Love–Carter county line		0.00	0.00	I-35 – Dallas, Oklahoma City	Western terminus; I-35 exit 24; road continues briefly as County Line Road
Love–Carter county line		0.4	0.64	US 77 – Ardmore, Marietta	
Love–Carter county line	Lake Murray SP	2.6	4.2		Serves Lake Murray State Park Airport
Carter	Lake Murray SP	2.8	4.5	SH-77S	Eastern terminus; road continues as Lodge Road
1.000 mi = 1.609 km; 1.000 km = 0.621 mi

== Junction list ==
County	Location	mi	km	Exit	Destinations	Notes
Love	Red River	0.00	0.00		I-35 south / US 77 south – Dallas, Fort Worth	Continuation into Texas
Love		1.0	1.6		I-35 north	Northern end of I-35 concurrency; I-35 exit 1
Love	Thackerville	5.3	8.5		SH-153	Western terminus of SH-153
Love	Marietta	15.5	24.9		SH-32 east (Main Street)	Southern end of SH-32 concurrency
Love	Marietta	15.6	25.1		SH-32 west (Memorial Drive)	Northern end of SH-32 concurrency
Love–Carter county line					SH-77S (western spur) – Lake Murray	
Carter	Ardmore	29.8	48.0		US 70	
Carter	Ardmore	32.2	51.8		SH-199 (Broadway Street)	
Carter	Ardmore	34.2	55.0		SH-142 (Veterans Boulevard)	
Carter	Springer	41.1	66.1		SH-53	
Murray		48.0	77.2		I-35 – Dallas, Oklahoma City	I-35 exit 47
Murray					To SH-77D south / Old Highway 77D	Former SH-77D south
Murray		52.4	84.3		I-35 – Oklahoma City, Dallas	I-35 exit 51
Murray					SH-77D south	Northern terminus of SH-77D
Murray	Davis	56.2	90.4		SH-7 west (Main Street west)	Southern end of SH-7 concurrency
Murray	Davis	56.6	91.1		SH-7 east (Main Street east)	Northern end of SH-7 concurrency
Murray–Garvin county line		65.5	105.4		SH-17A	Eastern terminus of SH-17A
Garvin	Wynnewood	67.0	107.8		SH-29 east (Kerr Boulevard)	Southern end of SH-29 concurrency
Garvin		69.0	111.0		SH-29 west	Northern end of SH-29 concurrency
Garvin	Pauls Valley	75.5	121.5		SH-19 east (Grant Avenue east)	Southern end of SH-19 concurrency
Garvin	Pauls Valley	75.7	121.8		SH-19 west (Grant Avenue west)	Northern end of SH-19 concurrency
Garvin	Paoli	83.0	133.6		SH-145	Eastern terminus of SH-145
McClain	Wayne	90.0	144.8		SH-59	
McClain	Purcell	96.1	154.7		SH-74 south	Southern end of SH-74 concurrency
McClain	Purcell	97.0	156.1		SH-39 west (Wyatt Road)	Southern end of SH-39 concurrency
McClain	Purcell				SH-74 north (Green Avenue north)	Northern end of SH-74 concurrency
Cleveland	Lexington	99.4	160.0		SH-39 east (Broadway Street)	Northern end of SH-39 concurrency
Cleveland	Norman	113.0	181.9		SH-9	Parclo interchange
Cleveland	Norman	113.8	183.1		SH-77H (12th Avenue NE)	Southern terminus of SH-77H
Cleveland	Norman	121.3	195.2		I-35 south	Southbound exit northbound left entrance; southern end of I-35 concurrency; I-35 exit 113
See I-35 (exits 114-125B)
Oklahoma	Oklahoma City	134.1	215.8	1A	I-235 (Centennial Expressway) begins I-35 north / I-40 / US 62 east (US 270 east) – Wichita, Ft. Smith	Exit number follows I-235; no exit number northbound; left exit and entrance southbound; northern end of I-35/US-62 concurrency; southern end of I-235 concurrency
Oklahoma	Oklahoma City	See I-235				
Oklahoma	Oklahoma City	139.0	223.7	4	I-44 (SH-66) / Santa Fe Avenue / N. 50th Street – Lawton, Tulsa; I-235 (Centennial Expressway) ends	Northern end of I-235 concurrency; exits unnumbered southbound; I-44 west exit 127, east exits 127A-B; northbound exit and southbound entrance
Oklahoma	Oklahoma City			—	N. 63rd Street	
Oklahoma	Oklahoma City			—	Wilshire Boulevard – Nichols Hills	
Oklahoma	Oklahoma City			—	Britton Road	
Oklahoma	Oklahoma City			—	Hefner Road – Lake Hefner	
Oklahoma	Oklahoma City			—	NE 122nd Street	
Oklahoma	Oklahoma City	143.9	231.6	—	I-344 Toll (Kilpatrick Turnpike)	
Oklahoma	Oklahoma City			—	Memorial Road / Kelly Avenue	North end of freeway
Oklahoma	Edmond	152.0	244.6		I-35 south (SH-66 west) – Oklahoma City, Downtown SH-66 east (2nd Street east) – Tulsa	Southern end of I-35 concurrency; I-35 exit 141
Oklahoma	Edmond			142	Danforth Road	Northbound exit and southbound entrance; exit numbers follow I-35
Oklahoma				143	Covell Road	
Oklahoma				146	Waterloo Road	
Logan				151	Seward Road	
Logan	Guthrie	163.3	262.8		I-35 north – Wichita	Cleo Bradshaw Interchange; northern end of I-35 concurrency; I-35 exit 153
Logan	Guthrie	168.1– 168.2	270.5– 270.7		SH-33	
Logan					SH-74C	Eastern terminus of SH-74C
Logan		185.5	298.5		SH-51 east	Southern end of SH-51 concurrency
Logan		185.8	299.0		SH-51 west	Northern end of SH-51 concurrency
Noble		197.3	317.5		SH-164	Eastern terminus of SH-164
Noble	Perry	199.6	321.2		I-35 – Guthrie, Tonkawa	I-35 exit 185
Noble	Perry	202.3	325.6		SH-86	Northern terminus of SH-86
Noble	Perry	202.6	326.1		US 64 west (Fir Street west)	Western end of US-64 concurrency
Noble	Perry	202.7	326.2		US 64 east (Fir Street east)	Eastern end of US-64 concurrency
Noble		210.3	338.4		US 412 / Cimarron Turnpike east – Tulsa	No access to US-412/Cimarron Tpk. west; Cimarron Tpk. exit 2
Noble		214.8	345.7		SH-15 east	Southern end of SH-15 concurrency
Noble		219.8	353.7		SH-15 west (Acre Road)	Northern end of SH-15 concurrency
Noble		220.8	355.3		SH-156	Southern terminus of SH-156
Kay	Tonkawa	231.3	372.2		US 60 Bus. east (North Avenue)	Southern end of US-60 Bus. concurrency
Kay	Tonkawa				US 60 Bus. ends / US 60 west	Interchange; western terminus of US-60 Bus.; western end of US-60 concurrency
Kay		233.3	375.5		US 177 north / US 60 Bus. east	Interchange; US-60 Bus. not signed eastbound; western end of US-177 concurrency; eastern terminus of US-60 Bus.
Kay		241.1	388.0		SH-156 south – Marland	Interchange; northern terminus of SH-156
Kay		241.9	389.3		US 60 Bus. east	Interchange; eastbound exit and westbound entrance; western terminus of US-60 Bus.
Kay	Ponca City	245.3	394.8		US 60 east (Harding Road east) / US 177 south (14th Street) / US 60 Bus. begin	Eastern end of US-60/US-177 concurrency; southern end of US-60 Bus. concurrency; eastern terminus of US-60 Bus.
Kay	Ponca City	246.9	397.3		US 60 Bus. west (South Avenue)	Northern end of US-60 Bus. concurrency
Kay	Ponca City	251.4	404.6		SH-11 east (Coleman Road)	Southern end of SH-11 concurrency
Kay		254.4	409.4		SH-11 west	Northern end of SH-11 concurrency
Oklahoma–Kansas line		267.21	430.03		US-77 north – Arkansas City	Continuation into Kansas
1.000 mi = 1.609 km; 1.000 km = 0.621 mi: Concurrency terminus; Incomplete access; Tolled

== See also ==
- List of U.S. Highways in Oklahoma

U.S. Route 77
Previous state: Texas	Oklahoma	Next state: Kansas
