= Interstate 240 (Oklahoma) =

Highway in Oklahoma

Interstate 240
- I-240 highlighted in red

Route information
- Auxiliary route of I-40
- Maintained by ODOT
- Length: 26.8 mi (43.1 km)
- Existed: 1965–present
- NHS: Entire route

Major junctions
- West end: I-344 / Kilpatrick Turnpike / SH-152 in Oklahoma City
- I-44 / US 62 / SH-3 in Oklahoma City; I-35 / US 62 / US 77 in Oklahoma City; SH-77H in Oklahoma City
- East end: I-40 / US 270 / SH-3 in Oklahoma City

Location
- Country: United States
- State: Oklahoma
- Counties: Oklahoma

Highway system
- Interstate Highway System; Main; Auxiliary; Suffixed; Business; Future; Oklahoma State Highway System; Interstate; US; State; Turnpikes
← I-235	→ I-244

Interstate 240 (I-240) is an Interstate Highway in southern Oklahoma City, Oklahoma, United States that runs 26.8 miles (43.1 km) from I-344 (John Kilpatrick Turnpike)/SH-152 to I-40/US 270/SH-3. The Interstate functions as a southern bypass around the Downtown area and is the spur of I-40.

== Route description ==
From the western terminus at I-344, I-240 runs east towards I-44 along airport road, it then goes concurrent with I-44 to U.S. Route 62 (US 62)/SH-3, it then runs east toward I-35. This western half is the busier of the two sections, serving the Southside area of Oklahoma City and traffic headed to the airport. This segment has a configuration of ramps that causes much weaving and many accidents. An entrance ramp merges onto the highway, forming a new lane. This new lane then becomes an "exit only" lane for the next exit. However, the exits are not spaced very far apart, causing entering and exiting traffic to conflict. Signs were installed in October 2004 designating the western half of I-240 as the Keith Leftwich Memorial Loop in honor of a state senator who had died around that time. I-240 meets I-35 at a cloverleaf interchange. US 62 splits off to join with I-35 northbound at this interchange.

The section of I-240 east of I-35 exists primarily to serve the now-closed General Motors plant and Tinker Air Force Base. This section is much less traveled, having only four lanes (two in each direction) for much of its length. At I-240's eastern terminus with I-40, motorists traveling eastbound on I-240 are forced to merge onto I-40 eastbound—there is no I-40 westbound offramp. (Those wishing to take I-40 westbound must exit off of I-240 one mile (1.6 km) earlier at Anderson Road, a surface street, and travel on it northbound until they reach I-40 or continue east on I-40 before turning around at the next exit at Choctaw Road.)

== History ==
The section of what is now I-240 between I-35 and the current I-44 was already complete in 1965 as an alignment of US 62. When the Interstate route was initially established in the 1960s, I-240 ran from its current eastern terminus around the city, turning north at the present interchange with I-44, continuing on the present course of I-44 to its present southern junction with I-35. (I-44 ended near Edmond at the western end of the Turner Turnpike at the time.) I-240 thus nearly created a loop around the city, intersecting both I-35 and I-40 twice. The section east of I-35 to its eastern terminus at I-40 was completed in 1973. The entirety of the route was completed in 1976. Once completed, I-240 was 31.76 miles (51.11 km) long.

As part of Oklahoma's 75th anniversary (Diamond Jubilee) celebrations in 1982, the Oklahoma Department of Transportation (ODOT) extended I-44 to Lawton and Wichita Falls, Texas along the H.E. Bailey Turnpike. This caused the western terminus of I-240 to be truncated to I-44 near Will Rogers World Airport.

On August 2, 2021, the Oklahoma Transportation Commission approved an extension to the I-240 designation to form a beltway around Oklahoma City. Starting in the existing eastern terminus, I-240 will run concurrent with I-40 to the Kickapoo Turnpike, then turn north and follow the Kickapoo Turnpike north to I-44 (the Turner Turnpike), then turn west along I-44 to the Kilpatrick Turnpike, following that road west and south to its current southern terminus at SH-152, then turning east along SH-152 and following that road east to I-44, which it will overlap until reaching the current western terminus of I-240, bringing the total length of the proposed I-240 loop to 91 miles (146 km). If signed, it will become the longest complete beltway numbered as a single Interstate Highway in the US, supplanting I-275 in Cincinnati, Ohio, at 83.71 miles (134.72 km). ODOT Director Tim Gatz stated in the Transportation Commission meeting that the numbering change was primarily to aid in navigation using digital mapping and routing applications. Gatz also said:

If you look at the Interstate 240 designation on the loop around the Oklahoma City metropolitan area, we are finally to the point where we have a truly contiguous route there that can shoulder the burden of some of that transportation need in a loop format. That's common practice across the country, and you'll see that in many of the metropolitan areas, and that update will really be beneficial as far as everything from signage to how do you describe that route on a green-and-white sign.

The designation was approved by the American Association of State Highway and Transportation Officials (AASHTO) in October 2021 with the condition that the Federal Highway Administration (FHWA) approve it as well.

In Fall 2023, the AASHTO approved an application from ODOT for an interstate designation on the Kickapoo Turnpike and the Kilpatrick Turnpike. However, the designations were assigned as I-335 and I-344, respectively; I-240 would not be extended along the turnpikes in order to give the turnpikes distinctive designations. In March 2024, the OTA announced that it would extend I-240 along Airport Road to the junction with the Kilpatrick Turnpike when the turnpike was designated as I-344. SH-152's eastern terminus was truncated to the junction between the turnpike and I-240, although signage has not been updated yet showing this change.

== Future ==
ODOT began a redesign process for the I-35/I-240 interchange in southeast Oklahoma City in 1998. It is currently a four-leaf cloverleaf interchange that was deemed to be outdated and the improvements will change it to a multi-level interchange with dedicated interstate ramps, turnaround lanes, and service roads for improved city street access in six phases. Phase 1 began in early summer 2016 and was completed in May 2017 while phase 1A construction began in mid-June 2017 and was completed in summer 2018. Construction on phase 1B began on June 5, 2023 and is expected to be completed in 2025.

== Exit list ==
The exit numbers have not been updated to reflect the western extension of I-240. The entire route is in Oklahoma City, Oklahoma County.

mi	km	Exit	Destinations	Notes
0.0	0.0		SH-152 west – Mustang	Continuation beyond western terminus
0.0	0.0	—	I-344 Toll west / Kilpatrick Turnpike west – Yukon	Counterclockwise terminus of I-344
0.5	0.80	—	Council Road	Westbound exit and eastbound entrance
3.0	4.8	—	MacArthur Boulevard – Mike Monroney Aeronautical Center	
4.0	6.4	—	Meridian Avenue – Airport	
5.2	8.4	—	I-44 east / SH-3 west to I-40 – Tulsa, Downtown	Western end of I-44 concurrency; western end of SH-3 concurrency; I-44 exit 116B
9.2	14.8	116A	SW 59th Street	Exit number follows I-44
10.0	16.1	1A	I-44 west / US 62 west – Lawton	Eastern end of I-44 concurrency; western end of US 62 concurrency; I-44 east exit 115
10.7	17.2	1B	S. May Avenue	
11.7	18.8	1C	S. Pennsylvania Avenue	
12.7	20.4	2A	S. Western Avenue	
13.2	21.2	2B	S. Walker Avenue	
13.7	22.0	3	S. Santa Fe Avenue / S. Shields Boulevard	Westbound signed as "Santa Fe Avenue" only
14.0	22.5	3B	Shields Boulevard / Santa Fe Avenue	Closed; westbound exit only
14.7	23.7	4	I-35 / US 77 / US 62 east – Dallas, Wichita	Eastern end of US 62 concurrency; signed as exits 4A (south) and 4B (north); I-35 exits 121A and 121B
15.2	24.5	4C	Pole Road	Closed; eastbound exit and westbound entrance
15.8	25.4	5	Eastern Avenue	
16.8	27.0	6	Bryant Avenue	
17.8	28.6	7	Sunnylane Road	
18.8	30.3	8	SH-77H south (Sooner Road) – Tinker AFB	Northern terminus of SH-77H
19.8	31.9	9	Air Depot Boulevard – Tinker AFB	
21.8	35.1	11	Douglas Boulevard – Tinker AFB, Midwest City	Signed as 11A (north) and 11B (south) eastbound
24.9	40.1	14	Anderson Road	
26.8	43.1		I-40 east / US 270 east / SH-3 east	Eastern terminus of I-240; no access to I-40 west; eastern end of SH-3 concurrency; I-40 west exit 165
1.000 mi = 1.609 km; 1.000 km = 0.621 mi: Closed/former; Concurrency terminus; Electronic toll collection; Incomplete access; Route transition
