= Turner Turnpike =

Toll road in Oklahoma, US

Turner Turnpike
- Turner Turnpike highlighted in red

Route information
- Maintained by Oklahoma Turnpike Authority
- Length: 86.5 mi (139.2 km)
- Existed: May 16, 1953–present
- Component highways: I-44 entire length

Major junctions
- West end: I-35 / I-44 / SH-66 / I-344 / Kilpatrick Turnpike in Oklahoma City
- I-335 / Kickapoo Turnpike in Luther; SH-18 in Chandler; US 377 / SH-99 in Stroud; SH-48 in Bristow; SH-66 / Creek Turnpike in Sapulpa
- East end: I-44 / SH-66 near Tulsa

Location
- Country: United States
- State: Oklahoma
- Counties: Oklahoma, Lincoln, Creek

Highway system
- Oklahoma State Highway System; Interstate; US; State; Turnpikes

The Turner Turnpike is a controlled-access toll road in central Oklahoma, connecting its two largest cities, Oklahoma City and Tulsa. Authorized by the Oklahoma Legislature in 1947 and opened in May 1953, it is the oldest of the state's twelve turnpikes. The route is signed as Interstate 44 for its entire length, but was constructed prior to its designation as such. The Turner Turnpike was named after Governor Roy J. Turner, who pushed for efforts to build this toll road to connect the state's two largest cities.

== Route description ==
The route begins north of Oklahoma City, as Interstates 35 and 44 and SH-66 approach it from the south. I-35/SH-66 split to the north, and I-44 begins its journey eastward as the Turnpike. (Traffic may also travel west at this point, along the John Kilpatrick Turnpike.) It ends 86 miles (138 km) later, southwest of Tulsa, at a junction with SH-66. The posted speed limit is as high as 80 mph (130 km/h), making it possible to drive legally from Tulsa to downtown Oklahoma City in under 90 minutes.

In addition to the Oklahoma City and Tulsa entrance points on the turnpike, other interchanges are located in Wellston, Chandler, Stroud, Bristow, near Kellyville and Sapulpa. Toll plazas are located at each of those interchanges. The toll plaza at Bristow was the first of the new plazas reconstructed incorporating "state-of-the-industry" electronic toll collection (ETC) and other operational features for the convenience and safety of motorists utilizing the turnpike system. Additional toll plazas, similar in design, were subsequently reconstructed at Chandler, Stroud, Kellyville, and Sapulpa. A new interchange 11 miles (18 km) east of the western terminus was added at Hogback Road in Luther, and was opened in May 2011.

== Future ==
On August 2, 2021, the Oklahoma Transportation Commission approved the designation of the portion of the Turner Turnpike from its western terminus to the Kickapoo Turnpike as part of an extension of Interstate 240, forming a beltway around Oklahoma City. ODOT Director Tim Gatz stated in the Transportation Commission meeting that the numbering change was primarily to aid in navigation using digital mapping and routing applications. Gatz also said, "If you look at the Interstate 240 designation on the loop around the Oklahoma City metropolitan area, we are finally to the point where we have a truly contiguous route there that can shoulder the burden of some of that transportation need in a loop format. That's common practice across the country, and you'll see that in many of the metropolitan areas, and that update will really be beneficial as far as everything from signage to how do you describe that route on a green-and-white sign." The designation must be approved by the American Association of State Highway and Transportation Officials (AASHTO) and the Federal Highway Administration (FHWA) to take effect.

== Tolls ==
At its inception Turner Turnpike was the first toll road west of the Mississippi River. The first toll amount was $1.40 for a one-way trip.

The Turner Turnpike has used all-electronic tolling since May 1, 2024. Cash is no longer accepted. Tolls are paid using PikePass, the Oklahoma Turnpike Authority's transponder-based electronic toll collection system, or PlatePay, which uses automatic license plate recognition to bill a vehicle's registered owner. As of 2025, a two-axle vehicle currently pays $5.40 with PikePass or $10.50 with PlatePay to drive the full length of the Turnpike, with higher rates charged for larger vehicles such as tractor-trailers. When adjusted for inflation, tolls have fallen over 50% to 4.65 cents per mile (2.89 ¢/km), among the cheapest in the nation. (In 2005 dollars, the toll was $9 in 1953.) However, despite being paid off, the Turner Turnpike will remain tolled, as Oklahoma does not toll its roads on a "per road" basis, instead pooling all toll revenue to apply toward paying off all such projects. This is called cross-pledging, which has allowed Oklahoma to build many turnpikes that would not be economically feasible alone.

PikePass tolls are calculated based on the vehicle's entry and exit locations, which are determined by transponder readers placed at each interchange and at the two termini. PlatePay tolls are collected at the main toll plaza located northeast of Stroud. Reduced PlatePay tolls are also collected at some interchange ramps for shorter trips which would not otherwise pass through the main toll plaza, although all PlatePay users that pass through the main toll plaza are charged the full toll regardless of entry or exit location.

Upon opening, the Turner Turnpike (as well as the Will Rogers Turnpike on the other side of Tulsa) used a closed ticket-based collection system. Motorists entering the turnpike were issued an entry ticket that indicated the location of entry, which was then presented to the toll collector upon exit to determine the toll amount. In 1991, both turnpikes switched to a somewhat unusual tolling system for cash-paying vehicles. A new mainline toll plaza was built northeast of Stroud (halfway between Oklahoma City and Tulsa), replacing the two mainline toll plazas at the turnpike's termini. Cash-paying motorists paid the full toll at this plaza and were issued a receipt. If one exited before reaching this plaza or entered at an interchange after the plaza, the toll for the portion travelled was collected at the interchange. If one's desired exit was located after the plaza, the motorist paid the full toll at the barrier plaza, then presented their receipt at the ramp for a refund of the untraveled portion. Entry tickets were also no longer issued except for those entering at an interchange before the main toll plaza. The mainline toll plaza also included open road tolling lanes for the then-newly introduced PikePass system, which are now used by all traffic following the all-electronic tolling conversion.

== Services ==
Full service areas featuring McDonald's restaurants and Love's gas stations are located eastbound just east of Chandler and westbound near Stroud. The Stroud facility was located in the median and previously served both eastbound and westbound traffic until June 2020 when the new Chandler service area opened to serve eastbound traffic(it continued to serve the westbound traffic until 2025). In 2025, plans call for reconstruction of the Stroud service area in the same general location as the existing facility. The turnpike will also be reconstructed to make the new westbound service area a right-hand exit off the turnpike (thus relocating the service area from the median to the north side of the turnpike).

Full service areas featuring similar amenities as the Stroud Service Area were previously located eastbound at Bristow and westbound at Wellston. The fuel stations at these locations closed in 2007, and the McDonald's restaurants were closed and demolished ca. 2011. A westbound gas station near Heyburn was closed in June 2017 in anticipation of a major turnpike reconstruction project and an eastbound gas station at Chandler was closed following the opening of the new eastbound Chandler service area. These five service areas were originally Howard Johnson's restaurants and full-service Phillips 66 stations, but changed to their current configurations in the 1980s as was the case with concession areas along other Oklahoma turnpikes.

Law enforcement along the Turner Turnpike is provided by Oklahoma Highway Patrol Troop YB, a special troop assigned to the turnpike.

== Exit list ==
Exit numbers follow I-44.

County	Location	mi	km	Exit	Destinations	Notes
Oklahoma	Oklahoma City	0.00	0.00		I-344 Toll west (Kilpatrick Turnpike)	Continuation west
Oklahoma	Oklahoma City			135	I-35 / I-44 west (SH-66) / Sooner Road – Wichita, Oklahoma City, Downtown	Westbound exit and eastbound entrance; western end of I-44 concurrency; exit 138A on I-35
Oklahoma	Oklahoma City			139	Post Road	Proposed interchange on the existing turnpike
Oklahoma	Oklahoma City	11.4	18.3	146	Luther, Jones	
Oklahoma	Luther			149	I-335 Toll south (Kickapoo Turnpike)	Northern terminus and exits 149A-B on I-335; opened October 14, 2020
Lincoln				155	SH-102 – Wellston	Proposed interchange on the existing turnpike
Lincoln	Wellston	22.3	35.9	158	SH-66 – Wellston	Former US 66
Lincoln		31.8	51.2	166	SH-18 – Chandler, Cushing	
Lincoln				173	Davenport	Proposed interchange on the existing turnpike
Lincoln	Stroud	44.5	71.6	179	US 377 south / SH-99 – Stroud, Drumright	Northern terminus of US 377
Creek		47.3	76.1	Toll gantry		
Creek				188	Depew	Proposed interchange on the existing turnpike
Creek		61.3	98.7	196	SH-48 (SH-66) – Bristow, Lake Keystone	Former US 66
Creek		68.2	109.8	203	SH-66 – Kellyville	Former US 66
Creek		75.8	122.0	211	SH-33 to SH-66 – Kellyville, Sapulpa, Drumright	
Creek	Sapulpa	80.7	129.9	215	SH-97 – Sapulpa, Sand Springs	
Creek	Sapulpa	82.2	132.3	218A	SH-66 – Sapulpa	Eastbound exit and westbound entrance
Creek	Sapulpa	82.3	132.4	218B	Creek Turnpike east – Joplin, Jenks, Broken Arrow	Eastbound exit and westbound entrance; western terminus of Creek Turnpike
Tulsa	Sapulpa	86.5	139.2		I-44 east / SH-66 east – Joplin	Continuation east; eastern end of I-44 concurrency
1.000 mi = 1.609 km; 1.000 km = 0.621 mi: Concurrency terminus; Electronic toll collection; Incomplete access; Unopened

== See also ==
- Oklahoma Turnpike Authority
- Pikepass
