= Interstate 35 in Oklahoma =

Section of Interstate Highway in Oklahoma, United States

Interstate 35
- I-35 highlighted in red

Route information
- Maintained by ODOT
- Length: 235.96 mi (379.74 km)
- NHS: Entire route

Major junctions
- South end: I-35 / US 77 at the Texas state line
- US 70 near Ardmore; SH-9 in Norman; I-240 in Oklahoma City; I-235 in Oklahoma City; I-40 in Oklahoma City; I-44 / Turner Turnpike / I-344 / Kilpatrick Turnpike in Oklahoma City; SH-66 Edmond; Future I-42 / US 64 / US 412 / Cimarron Turnpike near Perry; US 60 in Tonkawa
- North end: I-35 / Kansas Turnpike at the Kansas state line

Location
- Country: United States
- State: Oklahoma
- Counties: Love, Carter, Murray, Garvin, McClain, Cleveland, Oklahoma, Logan, Payne, Noble, Kay

Highway system
- Interstate Highway System; Main; Auxiliary; Suffixed; Business; Future; Oklahoma State Highway System; Interstate; US; State; Turnpikes
← SH-34	→ SH-35

Interstate 35 (I-35), in the US state of Oklahoma, runs from the Red River at the Texas border to the Kansas state line near Braman for a length of 236 miles (380 km). I-35 has one auxiliary route in the state, I-235, in the inner city of Oklahoma City. A second auxiliary route, I-335, is the designation for the Kickapoo Turnpike, although it will not meet I-35 until the southern extension of the turnpike to a junction with I-35 in Purcell is built. Excluding the Panhandle, I-35 forms the informal bisector for central Oklahoma, and along with US 81/US 283 in western Oklahoma and US 69/US 75 in the eastern portion, it provides one of the main north-south corridors through the state.

== Route description ==
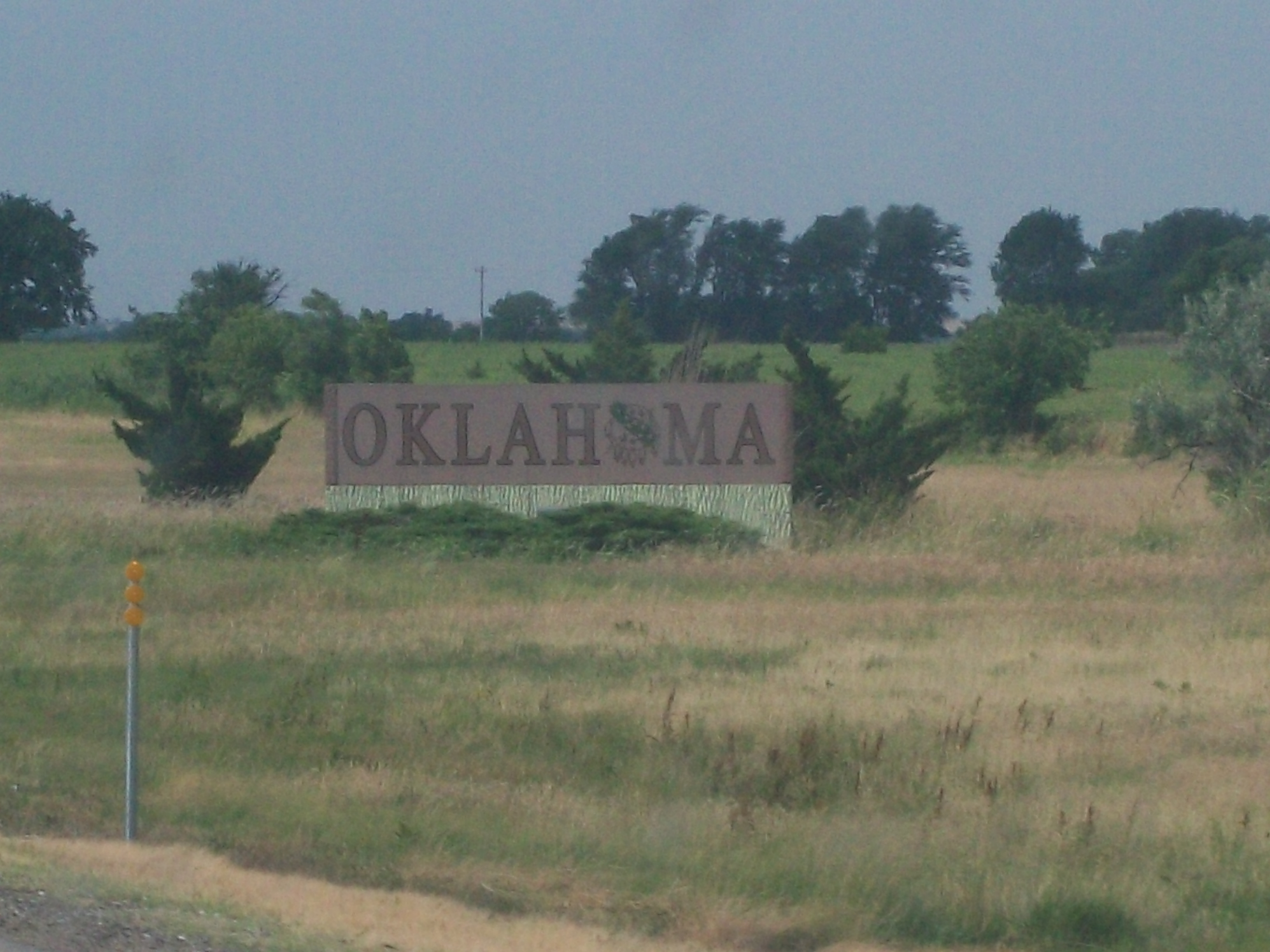
The Oklahoma welcome sign entering the state from Kansas

I-35 enters Oklahoma with U.S. Highway 77 (US-77) on a bridge over the Red River in Love County, south of Thackerville. US-77 splits off at exit 1 (Red River Road) but parallels the Interstate for its entire length in Oklahoma. I-35 maintains a near–due north–south course through Love and Carter counties. I-35 provides four exits to Ardmore. After leaving Ardmore, it has a brief concurrency with State Highway 53 (SH-53) and enters Murray County and the Arbuckle Mountains. I-35 then passes through Garvin County and the county seat of Pauls Valley. North of exit 79 (SH-145), I-35 enters McClain County. There, it passes through Purcell and Goldsby.

SH-9 joins the Interstate crossing over the Canadian River into Cleveland County, after which it splits off again. It then serves as a major urban Interstate in Norman and Moore. Between Norman and Moore, US-77 joins the Interstate again. It then enters Oklahoma City and Oklahoma County near milepost 120. Near downtown, I-35 splits off the mainline (which becomes I-235/US-77) and runs concurrent with I-40 for one mile (1.6 km) before splitting off to the north again. I-44 then joins I-35 between mileposts 133 and 137. In Edmond, US-77 joins the Interstate yet again.

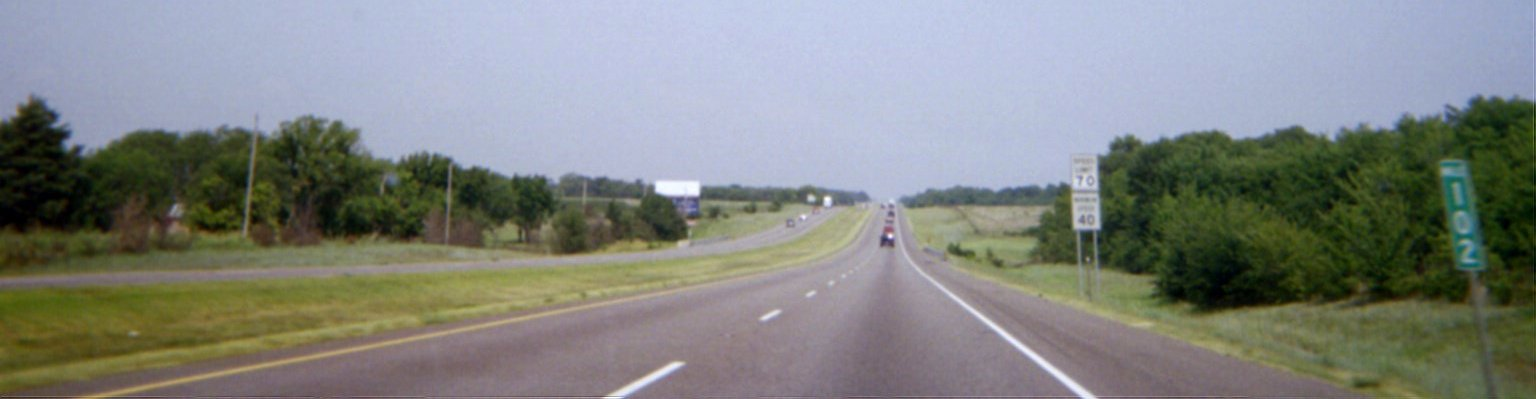
I-35 in Goldsby, Oklahoma, at milemarker 102

At milepost 146, I-35 enters Logan County. It serves Guthrie at exit 153 (South Division Street), where US-77 splits off, and at exit 157 (SH-33/East Noble Avenue). The Interstate then crosses the Cimarron River into Payne County and enters Noble County shortly thereafter. It provides two exits to Perry and serves as the western terminus of the Cimarron Turnpike (US-412). After providing access to Tonkawa and Blackwell in Kay County, it crosses into Kansas, becoming the Kansas Turnpike.

== History ==
Some sections of I-35 in Oklahoma City were already built in 1953 before the Interstate System was created. Following the passage of the Federal Highway Act of 1956 that created the Interstate Highway System, the Oklahoma Department of Transportation (ODOT) approved the location of the future Interstate north of Oklahoma City to the Kansas state line on a route previously surveyed by the Oklahoma Turnpike Authority for a proposed toll road. As a free road, the first five miles (8.0 km) of that section of I-35 were opened to traffic in 1958 from US-177 near Braman north to the Kansas border, where it continued as the Kansas Turnpike. This was followed by completion of the entire route from Oklahoma City northward to Braman by 1963 in several phases, including Edmond to Guthrie in 1960, Guthrie to Perry in 1961, Perry to Blackwell in 1962, and Blackwell to Braman in early 1963.

To the south of Oklahoma City, I-35 was completed through Norman south to Purcell in June 1959. In Moore, it opened in two parts: the northern half, connecting Moore to Oklahoma City, opened in January 1960. The southern half, linking it to Norman, was opened to traffic in June 1967. The Moore–Norman segment was originally a four-lane section of US-77 built in 1951 that did not meet full Interstate Highway standards and included several at-grade intersections within the City of Moore, including some with traffic signals, and upgraded accordingly to include grade separations to bring up to full Interstate Highway standards and frontage roads to serve local traffic needs. Also not up to full Interstate Highway standards prior to 1967 was a section in the vicinity of Lindsey Street in the southern portion of Norman where another at-grade intersection still existed which dated back to the original highway's construction in the early 1950s—this was also brought up to full Interstate Highway standards in 1967 with the construction of interchanges on I-35 at Lindsey and a short distance to the south for the future SH-9 bypass that would be built around the southern side of Norman in the early 1970s.

Further south, I-35 was completed from Marietta south to the Red River bridge in 1963, at which point a nearly 90-mile (140 km) gap of uncompleted Interstate would exist between Purcell and Marietta until the late 1960s with traffic continuing to be routed over paralleling US-77. This was in large part due to efforts of the towns of Wynnewood, Paoli, and Wayne fighting to keep I-35 as close as possible to US-77. This was successful due to a threat from Governor Henry Bellmon to build a toll road rather than I-35, and legislation preventing state funds for the Interstate from being spent if it were more than one mile (1.6 km) from the U.S. Highway.

The uncompleted gap of I-35 in Southern Oklahoma was narrowed in 1967 and 1968 when two sections were completed from US-70/SH-199 in Ardmore south to SH-32 in Marietta. In 1969, the section of Interstate bypassing Ardmore was completed north from US-70 two miles (3.2 km) to SH-142, and, the following year, 1970, brought the completion of I-35 from SH-7 near Davis south to Ardmore, at long last bypassing the winding section of US-77 through the Arbuckle Mountains. This stretch through the Arbuckles was particularly expensive and difficult to construct, taking almost two years and requiring the blasting and removal of 4 million cubic yards (3.1×10^{6} m^{3}) of rock. A few months later, in January 1971, I-35 was finally completed across the State of Oklahoma, when the remaining portions of the Interstate from Purcell to SH-7 near Davis were opened to traffic.

In 2008, ODOT announced plans to widen two miles (3.2 km) of I-35 through Norman, from the Main Street interchange (exit 109) to the McCall Bridge over the Canadian River. Controversy surrounding the project arose when early drafts eliminated the SH-74A/Lindsey Street interchange (exit 108B), due to its proximity to the SH-9 interchange (exit 108A). A public meeting held in Norman attracted 300 attendees, many bearing "Don't Close Lindsey" signs. Attendees cited the impact on local businesses and those attending University of Oklahoma football games as grounds for opposing the closure of the interchange. A former OU economics professor estimated the interchange's closure would cost Norman $100 million over the course of 15 years.

At the meeting, four proposals were displayed, only one of which displayed no access from Lindsey Street. A second proposal would preserve access to Lindsey Street but require the seizure of a newly built Chevrolet dealership near the interchange. The third proposal would instead send the ramps around the dealership, and the fourth, the highest-cost alternate, would use bridges to prevent Lindsey Street and SH-9 traffic from conflicting. ODOT said their design standards did not require consideration of OU football traffic, because they only considered the 30th highest traffic percentile. One ODOT engineer was quoted as saying, "Otherwise, we'd have to 10-lane everything in Norman." In early 2011, a solution was unveiled that would retain access to Lindsey Street and reconstruct the interchange without displacing the dealership.

In 2014, ODOT completed reconstruction of the Main Street interchange as a single-point urban interchange (SPUI) and widening of I-35 to just south of Main Street. In March 2015, ODOT began a two-year, $71 million project to reconstruct the Lindsey Street interchange as a SPUI, reconstruct the SH-9 interchange, and complete widening of I-35 to six lanes to the Canadian River. It was completed and opened in October 2017.

In August 2018, construction began for a new bridge for Southwest 34th Street over I-35 in Moore. The road had previously been unconnected due to sections on either side of I-35 ending at the frontage roads for the interstate. During the project, I-35 was briefly shut down after construction debris was blown off the bridge and onto the roadway on April 13, 2019. The overpass was not damaged; the debris blown off it was scaffolding and plywood. The bridge was completed and opened on November 21, 2019.

In April 2019, a bill that increased the speed limit from 70 to 75 miles per hour (113 to 121 km/h) on segments of rural Interstates was passed. On I-35, the speed limit would be increased from the Texas state line to mile marker 90 near Purcell, and from just north of mile marker 147 near Edmond to the Kansas state line. All of the new signs were installed by the end of 2020. Following this, it was announced in February 2022 that the speed limit of the freeway would become 65 miles per hour (105 km/h) from 89th Street in Oklahoma City to just south of the SH-9 West interchange in Goldsby. This change will make the speed limit consistent in the area, where it previously was not (some of the area had 70 mph [110 km/h] speed limits). All of the new signs were installed by the end of March.

The I-35 and SH-9 West interchange in Goldsby was reconfigured into a diverging diamond interchange in November 2025. The new design is expected to "accommodate large volumes of turning traffic by shifting traffic to the left side of a divided roadway through a series of coordinated signals for safer and more efficient left turns."

== Future ==
ODOT began a redesign process for the I-35/I-240 interchange in southeast Oklahoma City in 1998. It is currently a four-leaf cloverleaf interchange that was deemed to be outdated, and the improvements will change it to a multi-level interchange with dedicated interstate ramps, turnaround lanes, and service roads for improved city street access in six phases. Phase 1 began in early summer 2016 and was completed in May 2017, while Phase 1A construction began in mid-June 2017 and was completed in Summer 2018. Construction on phase 1B began on June 5, 2023, and is expected to be completed in 2025.

ODOT is planning an improvement project for I-35 between Robinson Street in Norman to SW 4th St in Moore. The project would include one-way frontage roads along the corridor as well as improve access to and from I-35 using X-ramps at existing interchanges and overpasses. Planning for the project began in 2016; a final request for comments via a virtual open house will be held between February 10 – March 10, 2026. Coinciding with that virtual open house was another one from the Oklahoma Turnpike Authority (OTA) regarding the future I-35/US 77/East-West Connector interchange, which will share the Indian Hills Road interchange. This virtual open house will be held between January 20 – February 20, 2026.

== Naming ==
- Through the Arbuckle Mountains, I-35 passes over the Honey Creek Pass.
- The bridge over the Canadian River is the S.K. McCall Memorial Bridge.
- In Norman, I-35 is the Dr. James E. and Representative Mina M. Hibdon Memorial Highway.
- In Moore, I-35 is the Helen Cole Memorial Highway. The bridge over NE 27th Street is the Airman Kamenski D. Watson Memorial Bridge.
- In Edmond, I-35 is the Shannon Miller Parkway.

== Exit list ==
County	Location	mi	km	Exit	Destinations	Notes
Love	Red River	0.00	0.00		I-35 south / US 77 south – Fort Worth, Dallas	Continuation into Texas
Love	Thackerville	1.11	1.79	1	US 77 north	Northern end of US-77 concurrency
Love	Thackerville	3.21	5.17	3	Winstar Boulevard	
Love	Thackerville	5.23	8.42	5	SH-153 – Thackerville	
Love	Marietta	15.30	24.62	15	SH-32 – Marietta, Ryan	
Love		21.41	34.46	21	Oswalt Road	
Love–Carter county line	Overbrook	24.45	39.35	24	SH-77S (western spur) – Lake Murray State Park	
Carter	Ardmore	29.20	46.99	29	US 70 east – Madill, Ardmore	Southern end of US-70 concurrency
Carter	Ardmore	31.67	50.97	31	US 70 west – Ardmore, Waurika, Lone Grove	Northern end of US-70 concurrency; signed as exits 31A (east) and 31B (west)
Carter	Ardmore	32.71	52.64	32	12th Street	
Carter	Ardmore	33.72	54.27	33	SH-142 – Ardmore	
Carter	Springer	40.80	65.66	40	SH-53 east – Springer, Gene Autry	Southern end of SH-53 concurrency
Carter	Springer	42.85	68.96	42	SH-53 west – Comanche	Northern end of SH-53 concurrency
Murray	Davis	47.56	76.54	47	US 77 – Turner Falls Area	
Murray	Davis	51.32	82.59	51	US 77 – Turner Falls Area	
Murray	Davis	55.83	89.85	55	SH-7 – Davis, Duncan, Sulphur	
Garvin		60.61	97.54	60	Ruppe Road	
Garvin	Wynnewood	64.27	103.43	64	SH-17A east – Wynnewood	
Garvin	Wynnewood	66.29	106.68	66	SH-29 – Wynnewood, Elmore City	
Garvin		70.36	113.23	70	Airline Road	
Garvin	Pauls Valley	72.90	117.32	72	SH-19 – Pauls Valley, Maysville	
Garvin		74.75	120.30	74	Kimberlin Road	
Garvin	Paoli	79.55	128.02	79	SH-145 east – Paoli	
McClain	Wayne	86.17	138.68	86	SH-59 – Wayne, Payne	
McClain	Purcell	91.10	146.61	91	SH-74 to SH-39 – Purcell, Lexington	Serves Purcell Amtrak Station
McClain	Purcell	95.37	153.48	95	To US 77 – Purcell, Lexington	No southbound entrance; US-77/Lexington not signed southbound
McClain	Washington	98.36	158.30	98	Johnson Road	
McClain	Goldsby	101.64	163.57	101	Ladd Road	
McClain	Goldsby	104.78	168.63	104	SH-74 south – Goldsby, Washington	
McClain	Goldsby	107.04	172.26	106	SH-9 west – Chickasha	Southern end of SH-9 concurrency
Canadian River				Samuel King McCall Memorial Bridge		
Cleveland	Norman	108.39	174.44	108A	SH-9 east – Tecumseh	Northern end of SH-9 concurrency
Cleveland	Norman	108.82	175.13	108B	Lindsey Street	Serves University of Oklahoma; former SH-74A
Cleveland	Norman	109.86	176.80	109	Main Street	Serves University of Oklahoma
Cleveland	Norman	110.88	178.44	110	Robinson Street / Interstate Drive	Signed as exits 110A (west) and 110B (east) southbound; Interstate Drive not signed southbound
Cleveland	Norman	112.87	181.65	112	Tecumseh Road	
Cleveland	Norman	114.21	183.80	113	US 77 south – Norman	Southbound exit and northbound entrance; southern end of US-77 concurrency
Cleveland	Norman	114.92	184.95	114	Indian Hills Road	Will be converted into a stacked interchange for the East-West Connector turnpike starting in Spring 2027
Cleveland	Moore	116.94	188.20	116	S. 19th Street	
Cleveland	Moore	117.89	189.73	117	SH-37 (S. 4th Street) / Main Street / N. 5th Street	Main Street/N. 5th Street not signed southbound
Cleveland	Moore	118.95	191.43	118	N. 12th Street / Main Street / N. 5th Street	Main Street/N. 5th Street not signed northbound
Cleveland	Moore	119.56	192.41	119A	Shields Boulevard	Northbound exit and southbound entrance
Cleveland	Moore	119.96	193.06	119B	N. 27th Street	No southbound entrance
Cleveland	Oklahoma City	120.93	194.62	120	SE 89th Street/SE 82nd Street	
Oklahoma	Oklahoma City	121.42	195.41	121A	SE 82nd Street	Formerly southbound exit and northbound entrance to I-240 collector–distributor lanes, now part of exit 120
Oklahoma	Oklahoma City	121.92	196.21	121	I-240 / US 62 west / SH-3 – Lawton, Ft. Smith	Southern end of US-62 concurrency; signed as exits 121A (east) and 121B (west); exits 4A-B on I-240
Oklahoma	Oklahoma City	122.42	197.02	122A	SE 66th Street	No Northbound Entrance
Oklahoma	Oklahoma City	122.94	197.85	122B	SE 59th Street	
Oklahoma	Oklahoma City	123.49	198.74	123A	SE 51st Street	No northbound entrance
Oklahoma	Oklahoma City	123.99	199.54	123B	SE 44th Street	No southbound entrance
Oklahoma	Oklahoma City	124.51	200.38	124A	Grand Boulevard	
Oklahoma	Oklahoma City	125.01– 125.27	201.18– 201.60	124B (NB); 125A (SB)	SE 29th Street / SE 25th Street	
Oklahoma	Oklahoma City	126.03	202.83	125B (NB); 125D (SB)	SE 15th Street	
Oklahoma	Oklahoma City	126.93	204.27	126	I-235 north (US-77 north) – Oklahoma Health Center, State Capitol, Edmond	Northern end of US-77 concurrency; southern terminus of I-235; northbound exit is unnumbered.
Oklahoma	Oklahoma City	126.93	204.27	—	I-40 / US 270 west – Amarillo	Southern end of I-40/US-270 concurrency; southbound exit and northbound entrance, northbound exit and southbound entrance via I-235 Exit 1B
Oklahoma	Oklahoma City	127.77	205.63	127	Eastern Avenue / Martin Luther King Avenue	Southbound Exit via I-40 East exit
Oklahoma	Oklahoma City	128.38	206.61	—	I-40 east / US 270 east – Ft. Smith	Northern end of I-40/US-270 concurrency
Oklahoma	Oklahoma City	129.19	207.91	129	NE 10th Street	
Oklahoma	Oklahoma City	130.19	209.52	130	US 62 east (NE 23rd Street)	Northern end of US-62 concurrency
Oklahoma	Oklahoma City	131.24	211.21	131	NE 36th Street	
Oklahoma	Oklahoma City	132.25	212.84	132A	NE 50th Street	
Oklahoma	Oklahoma City	133.26	214.46	132B	NE 63rd Street	Northbound exit only
Oklahoma	Oklahoma City	133.49	214.83	133	I-44 west (SH-66 west) – Lawton, Wichita Falls	Southern end of I-44/SH-66 concurrency; exit 130 on I-44
Oklahoma	Oklahoma City	134.30	216.13	134	Wilshire Boulevard	
Oklahoma	Oklahoma City	135.33	217.79	135	Britton Road	
Oklahoma	Oklahoma City	136.47	219.63	136	Hefner Road	
Oklahoma	Oklahoma City	137.60	221.45	137	NE 122nd Street	
Oklahoma	Oklahoma City	138.05	222.17	138	I-44 east (Turner Turnpike) / I-344 west (Kilpatrick Turnpike) – Tulsa, Yukon	Signed as exits 138A (east) and 138B (west); northern end of I-44 concurrency; eastern terminus of I-344
Oklahoma	Oklahoma City	138.43	222.78	138C	Sooner Road	Southbound exit and northbound entrance
Oklahoma	Edmond	138.70	223.22	138D	Memorial Road	
Oklahoma	Edmond	139.70	224.83	139	SE 33rd Street	
Oklahoma	Edmond	140.70	226.43	140	SE 15th Street	
Oklahoma	Edmond	141.67	228.00	141	US 77 south / SH-66 east (2nd Street) – Edmond, Tulsa	Northern end of SH-66 concurrency; southern end of US-77 concurrency
Oklahoma	Edmond	142.73	229.70	142	Danforth Road	Northbound exit and southbound entrance
Oklahoma		143.77	231.38	143	Covell Road	
Oklahoma		146.76	236.19	146	Waterloo Road	
Logan		151.80	244.30	151	Seward Road	
Logan	Guthrie	153.30	246.71	153	US 77 north – Guthrie	Northern end of US-77 concurrency
Logan	Guthrie	157.75	253.87	157	SH-33 – Guthrie, Perkins, Cushing	
Payne		170.68	274.68	170	Mulhall Road	
Payne		174.68	281.12	174	SH-51 – Stillwater, Hennessey	
Noble		180.87	291.08	180	Orlando Road	
Noble	Perry	185.91	299.19	185	US 77 – Perry, Covington	
Noble	Perry	186.92	300.82	186	US 64 east (Fir Street) – Perry	Southern end of US-64 concurrency
Noble		193.94	312.12	193	Airport Road	Northbound exit and southbound entrance
Noble		194.56	313.11	194	US 64 west / Future I-42 east / US 412 east / Cimarron Turnpike – Tulsa, Enid	Northern end of US-64 concurrency; signed as exits 194A (east) and 194B (west); exits 1A-B on Future I-42 / Cimarron Turnpike
Noble		204.06	328.40	203	SH-15 – Billings, Marland	
Kay	Tonkawa	212.09	341.33	211	Fountain Road	
Kay	Tonkawa	215.10	346.17	214	US 60 – Tonkawa, Ponca City	
Kay		219.11	352.62	218	Hubbard Road	
Kay	Blackwell	223.12	359.08	222	SH-11 – Blackwell, Medford	
Kay	Braman	231.19	372.06	230	Braman Road	
Kay		232.18	373.66	231	US 177 – Braman	
Kay		236.19	380.11		I-35 north / Kansas Turnpike north – Wichita	Continuation into Kansas
1.000 mi = 1.609 km; 1.000 km = 0.621 mi: Closed/former; Concurrency terminus; Incomplete access; Tolled

Interstate 35
Previous state: Texas	Oklahoma	Next state: Kansas
