= John Kilpatrick (politician) =

American government official

John Kilpatrick was the chairman of the Oklahoma Turnpike Authority in the early 1990s. The John Kilpatrick Turnpike in Oklahoma City was named after him.
