= Kilpatrick Turnpike =

Highway in Oklahoma

Kilpatrick Turnpike
- The John Kilpatrick Turnpike highlighted in red

Route information
- Auxiliary route of I-44
- Maintained by OTA
- Length: 31.0 mi (49.9 km)
- Existed: September 1, 1991–present
- Component highways: I-344 entire length

Major junctions
- CCW end: I-240 / SH-152 in Oklahoma City
- I-40 / US 270 in Oklahoma City; SH-66 in Oklahoma City; SH-3 in Oklahoma City; SH-74 in Oklahoma City; US 77 in Oklahoma City
- CW end: I-35 / SH-66 / I-44 / Turner Turnpike in Oklahoma City

Location
- Country: United States
- State: Oklahoma
- Counties: Canadian, Oklahoma

Highway system
- Oklahoma State Highway System; Interstate; US; State; Turnpikes

The John Kilpatrick Turnpike, signed as Interstate 344 (I-344) since November 2024, is a controlled-access toll road in Oklahoma City, Oklahoma. The turnpike forms a partial beltway around the west and north side of the city that runs from State Highway 152 (SH-152) and Interstate 240 (I-240) to an interchange with Interstate 35 (I-35) and Interstate 44 (I-44). At the eastern terminus, traffic continuing east merges with I-44 traffic, forming the Turner Turnpike. The Kilpatrick Turnpike is 31.0 miles (49.9 km) long.

The turnpike is named after John Kilpatrick who was the chairman of the Oklahoma Turnpike Authority in the early 1990s.

== Route description ==
The Kilpatrick Turnpike's entire route lies within the city limits of Oklahoma City. There are no exit numbers assigned to any of the turnpike's interchanges.

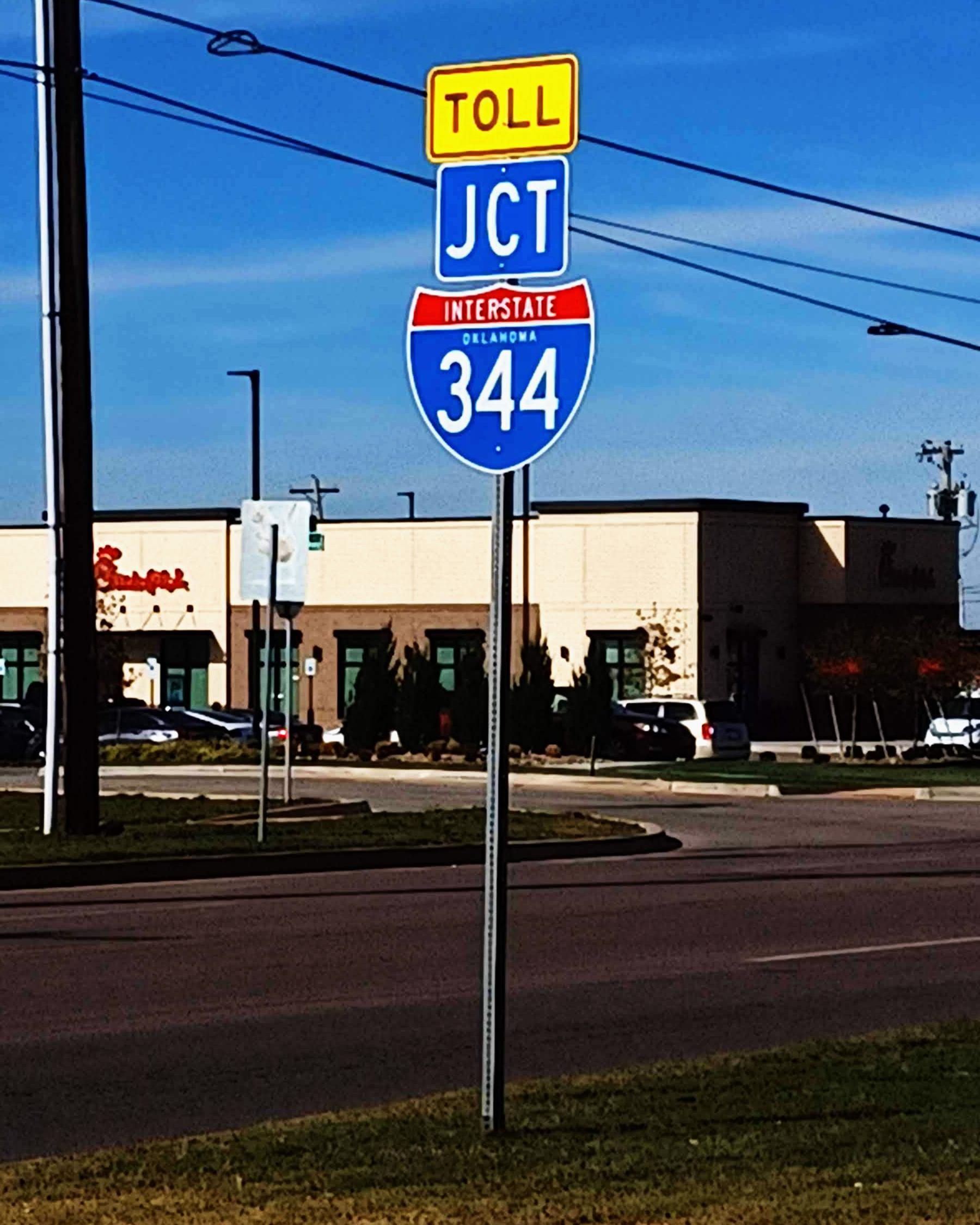
Interstate 344 signage in Oklahoma City

The Kilpatrick Turnpike begins at an interchange with State Highway 152 (SH-152) and Interstate 240 (I-240) just west of Council Road in southwestern Oklahoma City. The turnpike heads generally north and west from this interchange, with exits to Morgan Road, Sara Road/SW 29th Street, and a partial interchange with SW 15th street, with traffic exiting from southbound and entering northbound. From there, it angles northeast to a full interchange with I-40/US-270. Another partial interchange is located at N.W. 10th Street, with ramps allowing drivers to join the northbound turnpike and exit the southbound turnpike. The turnpike continues north, passing just east of the Yukon city limits, before making an S-curve to the east, running west of Lake Overholser. The turnpike's next full interchange is with State Highway 66 (SH-66), which runs along N.W. 39th Expressway. North of this interchange, the Kilpatrick Turnpike crosses the North Canadian River. The next interchange is with Wilshire Boulevard. Immediately north of Wilshire Boulevard is the first barrier toll plaza. The highway's next interchange is with SH-3, also known as the Northwest Expressway. The turnpike curves to the east north of here, entering Oklahoma County.

East of the county line, the Kilpatrick Turnpike follows the route of Memorial Road; Memorial splits into a pair of one-way frontage roads during this stretch. The next interchange, at Council Road, allows eastbound traffic to exit and westbound to enter the turnpike. The two interchanges to the east of here, at Rockwell Avenue and MacArthur Road, allow full access. At Meridian Avenue, traffic can exit the turnpike westbound and enter it eastbound. To the east lies an interchange with SH-74, a freeway known as the Lake Hefner Parkway. The interchange only allows direct access from the westbound Kilpatrick Turnpike to southbound SH-74 and from northbound SH-74 to the eastbound turnpike; all other movements must be completed via Memorial Road. The turnpike continues east, with full interchanges at May and Pennsylvania (Penn) avenues. East of Penn, the highway curves southeast, leaving the Memorial Road corridor. The next interchange is at Western Avenue. To the east of here is the second barrier toll plaza. After the toll plaza is the interchange with US-77, a freeway also known as the Broadway Extension. The turnpike then has an interchange at Eastern Avenue. The turnpike then comes to an end at I-35/I-44. Eastbound I-44 splits away from northbound I-35 at this interchange to form the Turner Turnpike, and the eastbound Kilpatrick Turnpike mainline merges into the Turner Turnpike toward Tulsa.

Law enforcement along the John Kilpatrick Turnpike is provided by Oklahoma Highway Patrol Troop YE, a special troop assigned to the turnpike.

== History ==
In 1987, the Oklahoma Legislature authorized construction of the first phase of the turnpike, between I-35 and Lake Hefner Parkway. It was completed in 1991. In 2001, an extension of the turnpike to I-40 was completed.

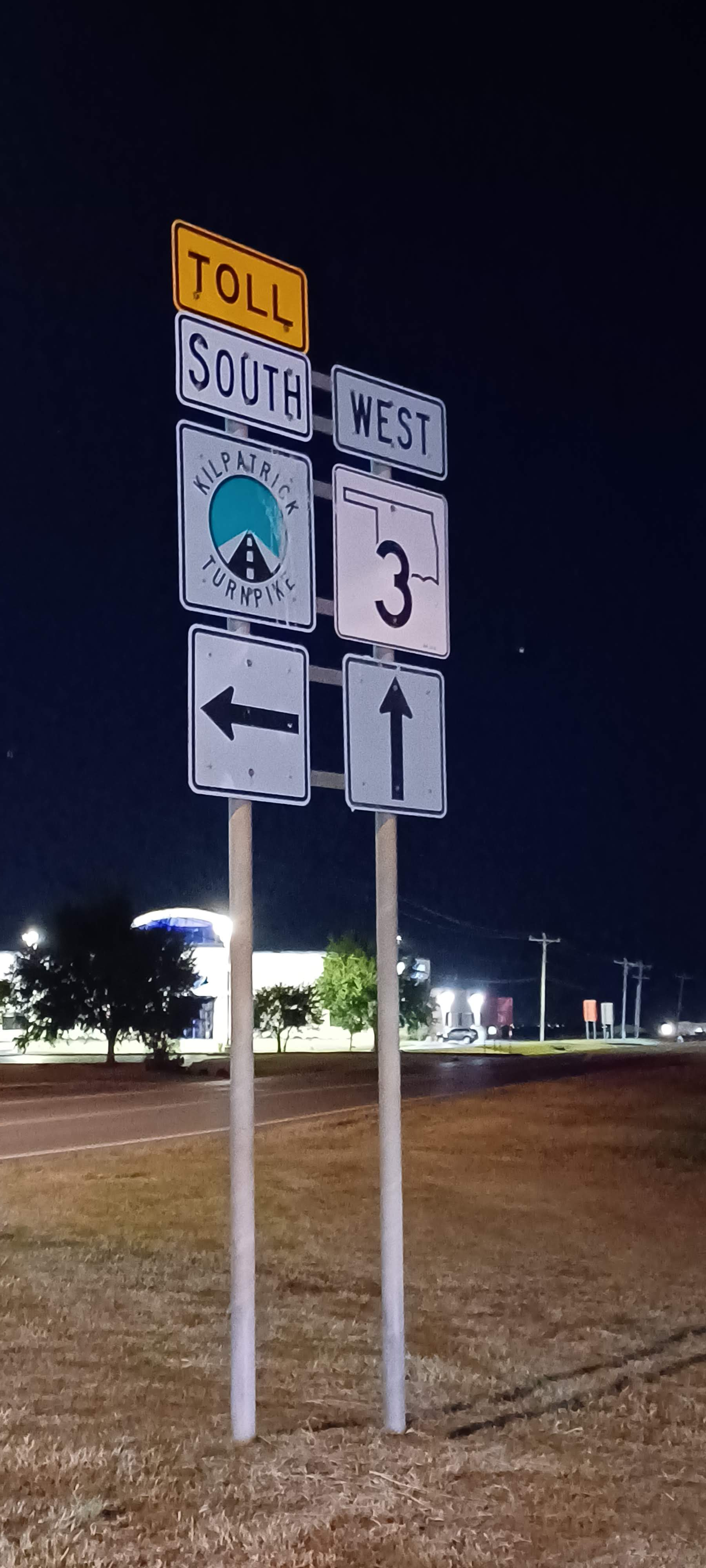
A shield directing drivers towards the John Kilpatrick Turnpike at its interchange with Oklahoma State Highway 3.

On October 29, 2015, Governor Mary Fallin announced that the Kilpatrick Turnpike would be extended south to end at SH-152 near Will Rogers World Airport as part of Driving Forward, a $892 million turnpike package. The project began on January 20, 2018. The westbound direction of the extension was opened January 9, 2020. The eastbound direction was opened on the following dates: January 28 from I-40 to Morgan Road, February 4 from Morgan to SH-152 westbound, and February 14 to what was formerly called SH-152 eastbound (currently I-240 eastbound).

In February 2021, the OTA announced that all of the turnpikes will feature all-electronic tolling within the next five years, starting with the Kilpatrick Turnpike. This change (known as PlatePay) began on the Kilpatrick in July 2021.

On August 2, 2021, the Oklahoma Transportation Commission approved the designation of the John Kilpatrick Turnpike as part of an extension of I-240, forming a beltway around Oklahoma City. ODOT Director Tim Gatz stated in the Transportation Commission meeting that the numbering change was primarily to aid in navigation using digital mapping and routing applications. Gatz also said, "If you look at the Interstate 240 designation on the loop around the Oklahoma City metropolitan area, we are finally to the point where we have a truly contiguous route there that can shoulder the burden of some of that transportation need in a loop format. That's common practice across the country, and you'll see that in many of the metropolitan areas, and that update will really be beneficial as far as everything from signage to how do you describe that route on a green-and-white sign." The designation would need to be approved by the American Association of State Highway and Transportation Officials (AASHTO) and the Federal Highway Administration (FHWA) to take effect.

In Fall 2023, the AASHTO approved for the John Kilpatrick Turnpike to be designated as Interstate 344 (I-344). In March 2024, the OTA announced that it would update signage for the turnpike over the next two months. The current turnpike logo would be removed and replaced with I-344 shields along with the yellow "TOLL" banner. I-240 will not be part of the turnpike; it will instead connect to I-344 via a short extension along Airport Road.

== Tolls ==
The Kilpatrick Turnpike has used all-electronic tolling since July 25, 2021; Tolls are paid using a PikePass transponder or PlatePay, which uses automatic licence plate recognition to send a bill to the vehicle's registered owner. As of 2025, motorists driving two-axle vehicles (such as cars and motorcycles) pay tolls of $3.84 if using PikePass or $7.98 if using PlatePay to drive the entire length of the turnpike. Drivers of vehicles with more than two axles, such as semi-trucks, pay higher tolls; six-axle vehicles are charged rates of $13.45 with PikePass or $26.38 with PlatePay. PikePass customers receive approximately 50% discounted toll rates compared to PlatePay at all toll plazas.

Tolls are collected at three mainline toll plazas along the turnpike, one immediately northwest of the turnpike's southern terminus at I-240/SH-152, one between the SH-3 and Wilshire Boulevard interchanges, and one between the US 75 and Western Avenue interchanges. There are also toll plazas at some entrance and exit ramps in places where shunpiking would otherwise be possible. Since opening, all toll plazas have had open road tolling lanes, which were previously dedicated for PikePass tagholders but are now used by all traffic. Previously, cash-paying customers exited to the right at each toll plaza to pay at traditional toll booths. Cash collection became automated in October 1996; cash-paying customers deposited exact coins into automatic toll baskets. Bill changers capable of changing $1 and $5 bills were available at some mainline toll plazas, as well as machines that produced receipts for customers requiring them.

== Exit list ==
The entire route is in Oklahoma City. All exits are unnumbered.

| County | mi | km | Destinations | Notes |
|---|---|---|---|---|
| Oklahoma | 0.000 | 0.000 | I-240 east | Counterclockwise terminus; western terminus of I-240; former SH-152 east |
| Oklahoma | | | Council Road | Westbound entrance only |
| Oklahoma | 0.2 | 0.32 | SH-152 west to SW 59th Street – Mustang | Eastern terminus of SH-152; eastbound exit only; westbound entrance still under construction |
| Canadian | 0.89 | 1.43 | Toll Gantry | |
| Canadian | 1.70 | 2.74 | Morgan Road | Tolled eastbound exit and westbound entrance |
| Canadian | 3.60 | 5.79 | SW 29th Street | Northbound exit and southbound entrance |
| Canadian | 3.80 | 6.12 | Sara Road | Southbound exit and northbound entrance; tolled |
| Canadian | 5.00 | 8.05 | SW 15th Street | Southbound exit and northbound entrance; tolled northbound; future full interchange |
| Canadian | 5.90 | 9.50 | I-40 / US 270 – Oklahoma City, Downtown, Yukon, Amarillo | I-40 east exit 138B and west exit 139A |
| Canadian | 7.10 | 11.43 | NW 10th Street | Southbound exit and northbound entrance |
| Canadian | 9.90 | 15.93 | SH-66 – Bethany, Yukon | Tolled northbound exit and southbound entrance |
| Canadian | 12.50 | 20.12 | Wilshire Boulevard | Tolled northbound exit and southbound entrance |
| Canadian | 13.12 | 21.11 | Toll Gantry | |
| Canadian | 14.50 | 23.34 | SH-3 / Morgan Road / Hefner Road | Tolled southbound exit and northbound entrance |
| Canadian–Oklahoma county line | 16.40 | 26.39 | County Line Road | Interchange under construction |
| Oklahoma | 17.40 | 28.00 | Council Road | Eastbound exit and westbound entrance |
| Oklahoma | 18.80 | 30.26 | Rockwell Avenue | Tolled westbound exit and eastbound entrance |
| Oklahoma | 19.80 | 31.87 | MacArthur Boulevard | |
| Oklahoma | 20.80 | 33.47 | Meridian Avenue | Westbound exit and eastbound entrance |
| Oklahoma | 21.80 | 35.08 | SH-74 (Portland Avenue / Lake Hefner Parkway) to I-44 | Tolled eastbound exit and westbound entrance |
| Oklahoma | 22.80 | 36.69 | May Avenue | Tolled eastbound exit and westbound entrance |
| Oklahoma | 23.80 | 38.30 | Penn Avenue | Tolled eastbound exit and westbound entrance; full name "Pennsylvania" |
| Oklahoma | 24.80 | 39.91 | Western Avenue | Tolled eastbound exit and westbound entrance |
| Oklahoma | 25.64 | 41.26 | Toll Gantry | |
| Oklahoma | 26.50 | 42.65 | US 77 – Oklahoma City, Edmond | Tolled westbound exit and eastbound entrance |
| Oklahoma | 28.00 | 45.06 | Eastern Avenue | Tolled westbound exit and eastbound entrance |
| Oklahoma | 29.30– 29.40 | 47.15– 47.31 | I-35 / I-44 west (SH-66) – Oklahoma City, Downtown, Wichita | Eastbound exit and westbound entrance; I-35 exit 138B |
| Oklahoma | 29.70 | 47.80 | I-44 Toll east / Turner Turnpike east – Tulsa | Continuation beyond clockwise terminus |
1.000 mi = 1.609 km; 1.000 km = 0.621 mi: Electronic toll collection; Incomplete access; Unopened

== See also ==
- Oklahoma Turnpike Authority
- Pikepass
