= List of Interstate Highways in Oklahoma =

- Highway markers for Interstate 40, Interstate 240, and Interstate 40 Business
- Interstate Highways highlighted in red

System information
- Formed: August 14, 1957

Highway names
- Interstates: Interstate X (I-X)
- Business Loops and Spurs: Interstate X Business (I-X Bus.)

System links
- Oklahoma State Highway System; Interstate; US; State; Turnpikes

Interstate Highways in Oklahoma form a network of freeways that cross the state. Several of them incorporated existing or already-planned turnpikes and continue to be maintained by the Oklahoma Turnpike Authority.

| Number | Length (mi) | Length (km) | Southern or western terminus | Northern or eastern terminus | Formed | Removed | Notes |
|---|---|---|---|---|---|---|---|
| I-35 | 235.96 | 379.74 | Texas state line south of Thackerville | Kansas state line north of Braman | 1971 | current | |
| I-40 | 331 | 533 | Texas state line west of Erick | Arkansas state line west of Fort Smith, Arkansas | 1959 | current | |
| I-42 | 190 | 310 | I-35 in Noble County, Oklahoma | Arkansas state line in Siloam Springs, Arkansas | proposed | — | Approved Future Interstate |
| I-44 | 328.53 | 528.72 | Texas state line north of Burkburnett, Tex. | Missouri state line west of Joplin, Mo. | 1964 | current | Follows the route of the H. E. Bailey Turnpike, Turner Turnpike, and Will Rogers Turnpike |
| I-235 | 5.36 | 8.63 | I-35/I-40/US-77/US-270 in Oklahoma City | I-44/US-77 in Oklahoma City | 1976 | current | |
| I-240 | 26.22 | 42.20 | I-344 (Kilpatrick Turnpike) in Oklahoma City | I-40 in Oklahoma City | 1965 | current | In 2024, I-240 was extended west following I-44 to SH-152 to I-344 adding 10 miles (16 km) to the route |
| I-244 | 15.75 | 25.35 | I-44/SH-66 in Tulsa | I-44/US-412/SH-66 in Tulsa | 1967 | current | |
| I-335 | 19.6 | 31.5 | I-40 near Oklahoma City | I-44 in Luther | 2024 | current | Redesignation of Kickapoo Turnpike; will be extended to I-35 in the future |
| I-343 | 52.31 | 84.18 | Creek Turnpike in Broken Arrow | I-40 near Webbers Falls | proposed | — | Approved Future Interstate; redesignation of Muskogee Turnpike |
| I-344 | 31.0 | 49.9 | I-240 in Oklahoma City | I-35/I-44 near Oklahoma City | 2024 | current | Redesignation of Kilpatrick Turnpike |
| I-440 | — | — | in Oklahoma City | I-35 in Oklahoma City | — | c. 1965 | Became part of I-240, currently part of I-44 |
| I-444 | 2.51 | 4.04 | I-244/US-64/SH-51 in Tulsa | I-244/US-75 in Tulsa | — | — | Unsigned highway |
| I-644 | 32.79 | 52.77 | I-44 (Turner Turnpike) in Sapulpa | I-44 (Will Rogers Turnpike)/US-412 in Fair Oaks | proposed | — | Approved Future Interstate; Redesignation of Creek Turnpike |
Former; Proposed and unbuilt
