= Oklahoma State Highway 16 =

State highway in Oklahoma, United States

State Highway 16

Route information
- Maintained by ODOT
- Length: 99.2 mi (159.6 km)
- Existed: 1936–present

Major junctions
- West end: SH-33 / SH-99 in Drumright
- US 75 / US 75 Alt. in Beggs; US 62 / US 64 from Haskell to Muskogee; US 69 in Muskogee
- East end: SH-51 in Wagoner

Location
- Country: United States
- State: Oklahoma

Highway system
- Oklahoma State Highway System; Interstate; US; State; Turnpikes
← SH-15	→ SH-17

State Highway 16 (SH-16 or OK-16) is a state highway in Oklahoma. It runs in an irregular 99.2-mile west-to-east pattern through the northeastern part of the state, running from SH-33 at Drumright to SH-51 at Wagoner. There are no letter-suffixed spur highways branching from SH-16.

SH-16 was established in 1936 as a gravel highway running between Bristow at its western end and Beggs at its eastern end. Since then, the highway has been paved and gradually extended to both the east and the west, finally reaching its present-day extent in 1965.

== Route description ==
SH-16 begins at SH-33 on the east side of Drumright, in western Creek County. From there, it travels six miles (9.7 km) south to the town of Shamrock, then 13 miles (21 km) roughly southeasterly to the city of Bristow.

SH-16 briefly overlaps SH-48 and SH-66 through Bristow. On the south side of Bristow, SH-16 heads east, then south, 10 miles (16 km) to the town of Slick, then continues another 12 miles (19 km) east to Beggs, where it junctions with U.S. Route 75 Alternate.

Four miles (6.4 km) east of Beggs, SH-16 intersects U.S. Route 75, a major national north–south highway and prominent in the area as a four-lane expressway connecting Tulsa and Okmulgee. From there it runs due east, intersecting SH-52 near the community of Bald Hill.

Twelve miles (19.3 km) after SH-52, SH-16 joins up with U.S. Route 62/64, six miles (9.7 km) south of Haskell. Five miles (8.0 km) later, SH-162 branches off to the north, connecting with the town of Taft, and in another eight miles (13 km) enters the city of Muskogee along Okmulgee Street.

In Muskogee, SH-16 meets U.S. Route 69 at 32nd Street, and turning north, forms a brief three-way concurrency (US-62/69/SH-16). At Shawnee Bypass, U.S. Route 62 and SH-16 turn east, and overlap three miles (4.8 km) to York Street, where SH-16 turns north on its own again.

SH-16 crosses the Arkansas and Verdigris Rivers, and passes under the Muskogee Turnpike, intersecting with SH-251A in Okay. Eight miles (13 km) farther to the north and west, SH-16 ends at SH-51, on the south side of Wagoner.

== History ==
The present incarnation of SH-16 first appeared on Oklahoma's state highway map in 1937 as a gravel highway connecting Bristow to Beggs. This would be SH-16's extent for nearly two decades. This section of the highway was first paved in 1950.

SH-16 was not extended beyond Beggs until 1954, when it was extended east to US-62 and US-64. This section of gravel highway had a slight jog to the north, causing it to meet the U.S. highways at Jamesville, north of the present-day junction. The following year, SH-16 was extended even further east, passing through Muskogee via US-62, US-64, and US-69, and proceeding along its present-day alignment to Okay. In Okay, the highway turned east, following present-day SH-251A across Fort Gibson Dam and coming to an end at SH-80. This extension was entirely paved.

In 1958, the jog between Beggs and Jamesville was removed, moving the US-62/64 junction to its present-day location; this portion of highway remained unpaved. The 1961 map shows the entirety of the Beggs—US-62/64 segment as paved, however, the following year's map shows the portion east of the Okmulgee–Muskogee County line as gravel. By 1963 this portion of gravel highway in Muskogee County had apparently been paved.

The highway was extended again in 1961, this time to the west. At that time, SH-16 absorbed the wholly paved SH-27 between Bristow and Drumright, setting its western terminus at its present-day location. SH-16's final extension occurred in 1965, when SH-251A was established and SH-16 was realigned to instead continue north past Okay and terminate at SH-51 in Wagoner. No further changes have been made to the highway since then.

== Junction list ==
County	Location	mi	km	Destinations	Notes
Creek	Drumright	0.0	0.0	SH-33 / SH-99	Western terminus
Creek	Bristow	19.2	30.9	SH-48 / SH-66	Northern end of SH-48 and SH-66 concurrency
Creek	Bristow	19.9	32.0	SH-66	Southern end of SH-66 concurrency
Creek	Bristow	20.3	32.7	SH-48	Southern end of SH-48 concurrency
Okmulgee	Beggs	42.5	68.4	US 75 Alt.	Western end of US-75 Alt. concurrency
Okmulgee		46.1	74.2	US 75 / US 75 Alt.	Eastern terminus of US-75 Alt.
Okmulgee		54.6	87.9	SH-52	Northern terminus of SH-52
Muskogee		66.5	107.0	US 62 / US 64	Western end of US-62 and US-64 concurrency
Muskogee		71.5	115.1	SH-162	Southern terminus of SH-162
Muskogee	Muskogee	80.2	129.1	US 64 / US 69 / US 62 Bus.	Eastern end of US-64 concurrency, southern end of US-69 concurrency
Muskogee	Muskogee	81.3	130.8	US 69	Northern end of US-69 concurrency
Muskogee	Muskogee	83.8	134.9	US 62 Bus.	
Muskogee	Muskogee	84.8	136.5	US 62	Eastern end of US-62 concurrency
Wagoner	Okay	90.5	145.6	SH-251A	Western terminus of SH-251A
Wagoner	Wagoner	99.2	159.6	SH-51	Eastern terminus
1.000 mi = 1.609 km; 1.000 km = 0.621 mi: Concurrency terminus
