= Oklahoma State Highway 52 =

State highway in Oklahoma, United States

State Highway 52

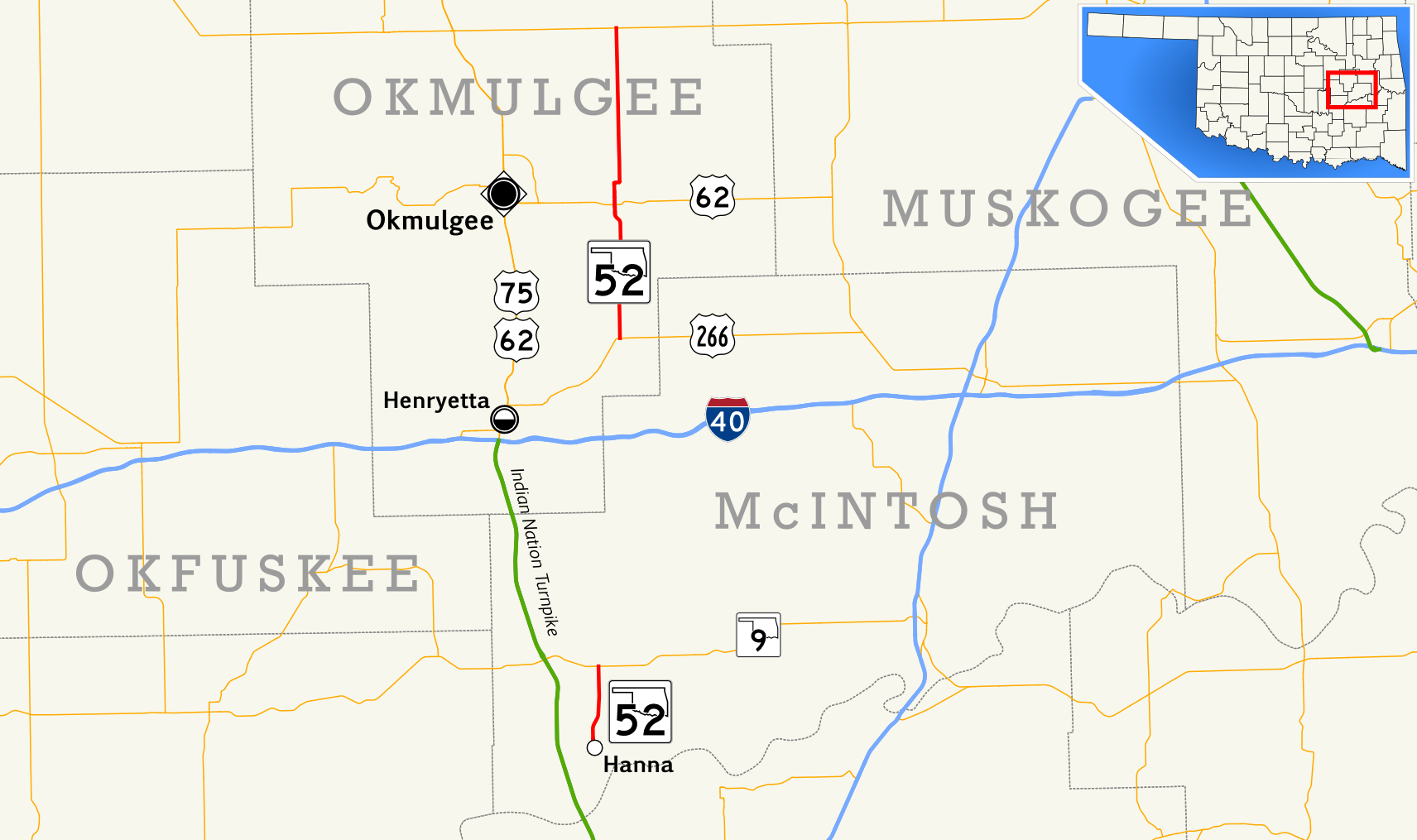

Route information
- Maintained by ODOT

Section 1
- Length: 4.06 mi (6.53 km)
- South end: Hanna
- North end: SH-9 near Hanna

Section 2
- Length: 16.46 mi (26.49 km)
- South end: US 266 near Grayson
- Major intersections: US 62 in Morris
- North end: SH-16 in Bald Hill

Location
- Country: United States
- State: Oklahoma

Highway system
- Oklahoma State Highway System; Interstate; US; State; Turnpikes
← SH-51	→ SH-53

State Highway 52 (abbreviated SH-52) is two once-connected highways in the U.S. state of Oklahoma. There are no lettered spur routes from either of them.

== Route description ==
=== Southern section ===
The southern SH-52 is a short, 4.06 miles (6.53 km) state highway in McIntosh County, Oklahoma. It connects State Highway 9 to the town of Hanna.

=== Northern section ===
The northern SH-52 runs for 16.46 miles (26.49 km) from US-266 northeast of Grayson to SH-16. Along the way it intersects US-62 near Morris.

== History ==
At one time, at least as recently as 1972, the two sections of SH-52 were connected by a dirt section running from SH-9 to US-266. This section has since been decommissioned.

== Junction list ==
=== Southern section ===
The entire route is in McIntosh County.

Location	mi	km	Destinations	Notes
Hanna	0.00	0.00	Countryside Road	Southern terminus
	4.06	6.53	SH-9	Northern terminus
1.000 mi = 1.609 km; 1.000 km = 0.621 mi

=== Northern section ===
The entire route is in Okmulgee County.

Location	mi	km	Destinations	Notes
	0.00	0.00	US 266	Southern terminus
Morris	7.05	11.35	US 62	
	16.46	26.49	SH-16	Northern terminus
1.000 mi = 1.609 km; 1.000 km = 0.621 mi
