= Oklahoma State Highway 164 =

State highway in Oklahoma, United States

State Highway 164
- SH-164 highlighted in red

Route information
- Maintained by ODOT
- Length: 12.64 mi (20.34 km)
- Existed: c. 1971–present

Major junctions
- West end: SH-74 near Covington
- East end: US 77 west of Perry

Location
- Country: United States
- State: Oklahoma

Highway system
- Oklahoma State Highway System; Interstate; US; State; Turnpikes
← SH-162	→ SH-165

State Highway 164 (abbreviated SH-164) is a state highway in north-central Oklahoma. It runs from SH-74 in Covington to U.S. Route 77 (US-77) west of Perry. SH-164 is 12.64 miles (20.34 km) long. It has no lettered spur routes.

The route of SH-164 was initially served by US-64. The highway was assigned the SH-164 designation when US-64 was realigned around 1971.

== Route description ==
SH-164 begins on the southern fringes of Covington at a junction with SH-74. The highway heads east-southeast from this point, paralleling a rail line. About three miles (4.8 km) away from the terminus, the highway breaks away from the railroad, heading on a more easterly course, bypassing Hayward to the north. The highway then crosses from Garfield County into Noble County. Just after entering Noble County, it runs along the north outskirts of Lucien. The road then continues on a due east course before ending at US-77 west of Perry.

== History ==
SH-164 was originally part of US-64. US-64 and SH-15 proceeded east out of Enid until reaching SH-74, where SH-15 turned north and US-64 turned south. After following SH-74 to Covington, US-64 turned east, following present-day SH-164 east to US-77. From there, it followed US-77 into Perry.

By 1972, US-64 had been realigned, continuing due east from SH-74 rather than forming a concurrency with it. Instead, it continued east to I-35, following it south to Perry. The old alignment of US-64 between Perry and Covington then became SH-164.

== Junction list ==
County	Location	mi	km	Destinations	Notes
Garfield	Covington	0.00	0.00	SH-74	Western terminus
Noble		12.64	20.34	US 77	Eastern terminus
1.000 mi = 1.609 km; 1.000 km = 0.621 mi
