= Oklahoma State Highway 162 =

State highway in Oklahoma, United States

State Highway 162
- SH-162 highlighted in red

Route information
- Maintained by ODOT
- Length: 1.32 mi (2.12 km)
- Existed: ca. 1967–present

Major junctions
- South end: US 62 / US 64 / SH-16 west of Muskogee
- North end: Old Taft Road in Taft

Location
- Country: United States
- State: Oklahoma

Highway system
- Oklahoma State Highway System; Interstate; US; State; Turnpikes
← SH-156	→ SH-164

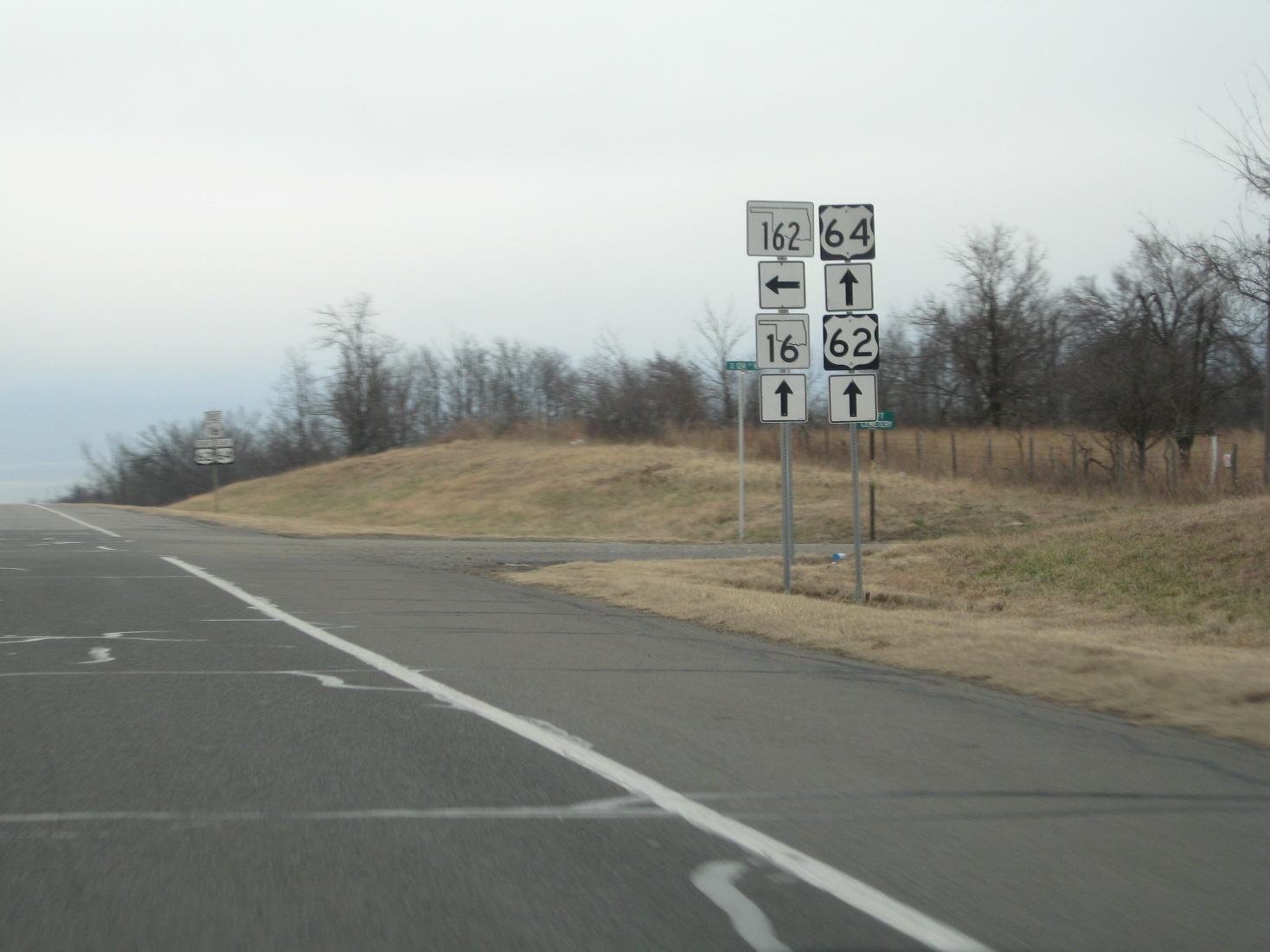
SH-162 on a sign assembly along US 62 et al.

State Highway 162 (SH-162/OK-162) is a 1.32-mile-long (2.12 km) (2.1 km) state highway in the U.S. state of Oklahoma that provides access from US-62/US-64/SH-16 to the town of Taft. The highway lies entirely within Muskogee County. Serving as a spur route itself, the highway has no letter-suffixed spur routes of its own.

== Route description ==
SH-162 begins at the US-62/64/SH-16 expressway south of Taft, then proceeds due north for 1.32 miles (2.12 km), ending on the western edge of town. The route's northern terminus is at Old Taft Road, the old alignment of US-62/64.

== History ==
From the routes' establishment into the mid-1960s, US-62 and US-64 passed through Taft along what is now Old Taft Road en route to the county seat of Muskogee. On July 10, 1967, however, the state shifted the routes onto the present-day expressway south of town. SH-162 was created around the same time, allowing Taft to remain connected to the state highway system. The change to US-62/64/SH-16's alignment was not reflected on the official state highway map until the 1969 edition; this was also the first edition of the state highway map to show SH-162.

== Junction list ==
The entire route is in Muskogee County.

Location	mi	km	Destinations	Notes
	0.00	0.00	US 62 / US 64 / SH-16	Southern terminus
Taft	1.32	2.12	Old Taft Road	Northern terminus
1.000 mi = 1.609 km; 1.000 km = 0.621 mi
