= Creek Turnpike =

Highway in Oklahoma

Creek Turnpike
- Creek Turnpike highlighted in red

Route information
- Maintained by OTA and ODOT
- Length: 33.22 mi (53.46 km)
- Existed: July 30, 1992–present
- Component highways: SH-364 entire length; US 64 / US 169 in Tulsa

Major junctions
- West end: I-44 Toll / Turner Turnpike in Sapulpa
- US 75 in Jenks; US 64 / US 169 in Tulsa; SH-51 in Broken Arrow; Muskogee Turnpike in Broken Arrow
- East end: I-44 / Will Rogers Turnpike / US 412 in Fair Oaks

Location
- Country: United States
- State: Oklahoma
- Counties: Creek, Tulsa, Wagoner, Rogers

Highway system
- Oklahoma State Highway System; Interstate; US; State; Turnpikes

The Creek Turnpike, also designated State Highway 364 (SH-364), is a 33.2-mile (53.4 km) toll road that lies entirely in the U.S. state of Oklahoma. The controlled-access turnpike forms a partial beltway around the south and east sides of Tulsa, Oklahoma's second largest city. The Creek Turnpike's western terminus is at the Turner Turnpike in Sapulpa, while its northeastern terminus is at the Will Rogers Turnpike in Fair Oaks; both ends of the Creek Turnpike connect with Interstate 44 (I-44). Along the way, the highway passes through the cities of Sapulpa, Jenks, Tulsa, and Broken Arrow, and the counties of Creek, Tulsa, Wagoner and Rogers. The road is maintained by the Oklahoma Turnpike Authority (OTA), except for a brief free section shared with U.S. Route 64 (US-64) and US-169, which is maintained by the Oklahoma Department of Transportation (ODOT).

The first section of the Creek Turnpike, from US-75 in Jenks to US-64/US-169 in Tulsa, was first authorized in 1987, with construction beginning in 1989. The turnpike's construction was controversial; homeowners along the route of the highway formed a group called Tulsans Against Turnpikes to fight the highway in both the courtroom and the media. The highway was also challenged on environmental grounds, with impacts upon wetlands and endangered species being the chief concerns. Nevertheless, the highway opened to traffic in three sections, starting from the easternmost, over the course of the first half of 1992.

Further extensions to both the east and the west followed in later years after several years of false starts under the administrations of two different governors. Expansion of the highway was finally approved in 1998. The extension to the west, linking the Creek Turnpike to the Turner Turnpike in Sapulpa, opened December 15, 2000. The extension to the east opened in three parts over the course of 2001 and 2002.

Flat-rate tolls are collected at three mainline toll plazas along the turnpike, as well as at several entrances and exits. Since February 8, 2023, toll collection on the Creek Turnpike has been all-electronic, with all tolls paid using PikePass or PlatePay (which uses automatic license plate recognition).

== Route description ==
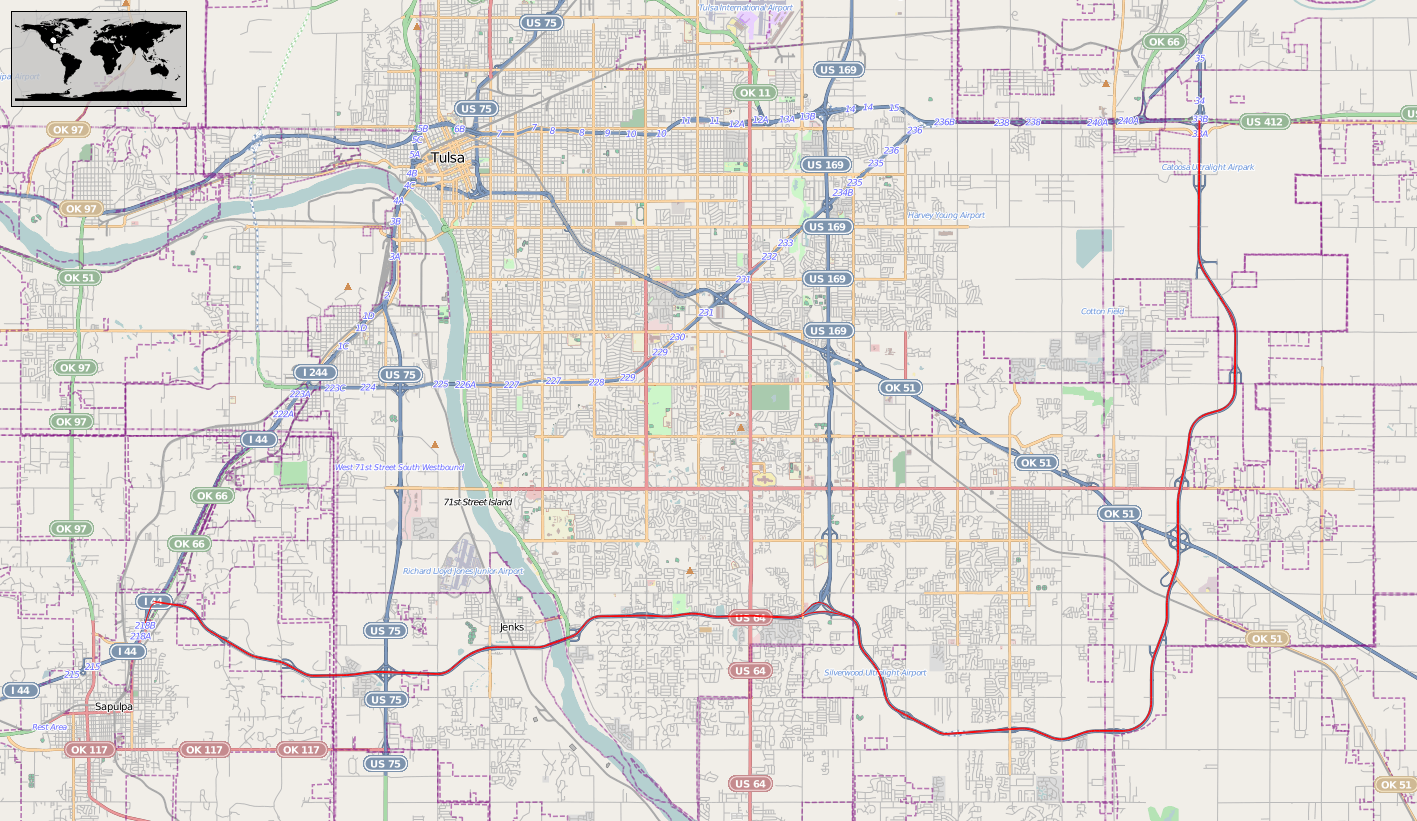
Map of Creek Turnpike (bright red) through the Tulsa metro area

The Creek Turnpike begins at I-44 (Turner Turnpike) exit 217 in the city of Sapulpa. This interchange only provides access from eastbound I-44 to the Creek Turnpike and from the Creek Turnpike to westbound I-44. The turnpike runs in a general southeast direction from this terminus towards the Creek–Tulsa county line, crossing over Polecat Creek. Upon crossing into Tulsa County, the toll road turns to a more easterly course. The highway enters Jenks less than one mile (approximately 1.6 km) east of the county line. In Jenks, the highway has a modified cloverleaf interchange at US-75; the westbound Turnpike to southbound US-75 ramp is a directional ramp rather than a loop ramp. The Creek Turnpike then passes through the first of three barrier toll plazas. Near the interchange with Elm Street (signed as "Peoria–Elm"; Elm Street is named Peoria Avenue outside of Jenks), the highway bridges Polecat Creek again, before crossing the Arkansas River into Tulsa.

In Tulsa, the Creek Turnpike has an interchange at Memorial Drive, which carries US-64 south of the toll road. At this interchange, Creek Turnpike traffic merges with northbound US-64 onto a free road, forming the Mingo Valley Expressway. US-169 also begins at this interchange, heading north from here toward its other end in Virginia, Minnesota. As the Mingo Valley Expressway (carrying US-64/US-169) turns north, the Creek Turnpike exits to continue southeast. The highway leaves Tulsa, entering Broken Arrow, where it crosses over Haikey Creek. The turnpike passes through the second toll plaza, then turns back east.

In southeast Broken Arrow, the Creek Turnpike crosses the county line into Wagoner County and swings towards the north-northeast. It then meets SH-51, followed by the Muskogee Turnpike (SH-351) near that highway's western terminus. The Creek Turnpike passes through the third and final barrier toll after re-entering Tulsa. From the toll plaza, the turnpike proceeds north to end at the I-44/US-412 interchange, which straddles the Wagoner–Rogers County county line. The portion of the interchange that sits in Rogers County also lies in the town of Fair Oaks. The mainline Creek Turnpike becomes the Will Rogers Turnpike as eastbound I-44 merges onto the roadway.

Exit numbers are absent along the Creek Turnpike until the 51st Street South interchange, which is numbered as exit 28. Exit numbers are posted north of this interchange, continuing until the highway's terminus (exits 33A–B). The Creek Turnpike's exit numbering is used for the final two exits on the westbound Will Rogers Turnpike—the westbound-only Pine Street exit (exit 35) and the westbound I-44 ramp (exit 34).

The entirety of the Creek Turnpike has been recognized as important to the country's economy, defense, and mobility by its inclusion in the National Highway System. In 2011, the highest average annual daily traffic (AADT) count was 26,900 vehicles eastbound and 26,476 vehicles westbound between the Yale Avenue and Memorial Drive interchanges. The lowest AADT counts, 4,426 vehicles eastbound and 4,463 vehicles westbound, were recorded between the 11th Street interchange and the northeastern terminus. Law enforcement along the Creek Turnpike is provided by Oklahoma Highway Patrol Troop XE, a special troop assigned to the turnpike.

== History ==
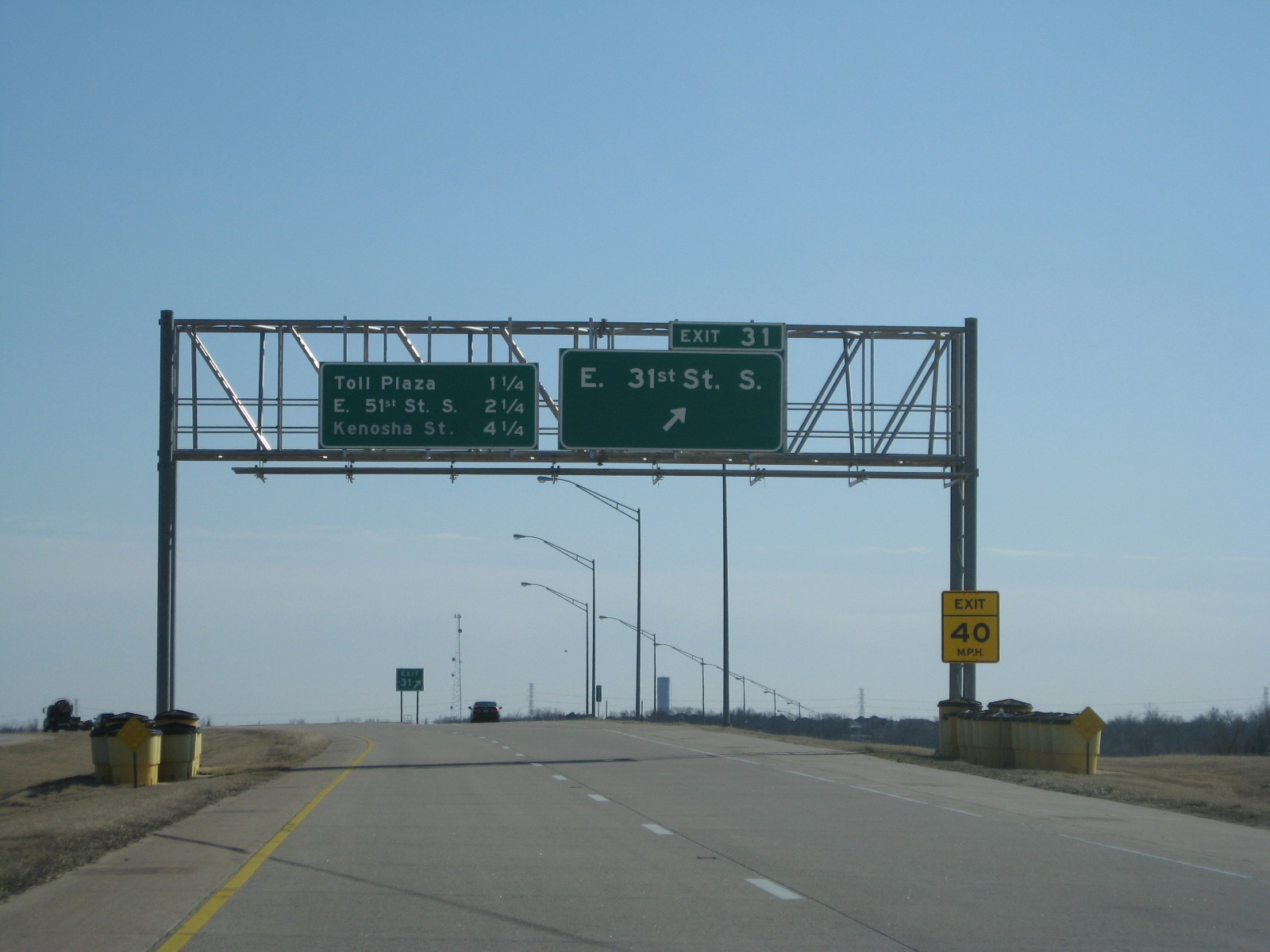
Signage at exit 31

=== Planning for the first segment ===
As early as the late 1950s, plans for a Tulsa freeway system included a route along 96th Street South. The 96th Street corridor was accessible to more motorists than other corridors further south (farther away from the urban core), while still having low right-of-way costs, comparable to more southerly corridors. This made it the ideal route for a south Tulsa freeway. In 1986, ODOT had plans to build a toll-free facility called the Creek Freeway in the corridor as part of SH-117.

A south Tulsa turnpike was first authorized by OTA in 1987, the same time as three other turnpikes that would ultimately become the Cherokee, Chickasaw, and John Kilpatrick turnpikes. Eleven possible routings were researched before OTA settled on the 96th Street corridor as the site of the proposed turnpike. On February 16, 1989, OTA sold $558.4 million in revenue bonds (about $1.23 billion in 2024 dollars) to cover the cost of all four proposed turnpikes.

As originally planned, the Creek Turnpike was to begin at US-75 and end at Memorial Drive, for a total length of 6.9 miles (11.1 km). ODOT would then build a $26 million (approximately $57 million in 2024 dollars) freeway connection from the eastern terminus of the turnpike at Memorial Drive to tie in with the south end of the Mingo Valley Expressway. OTA intended the turnpike to be built on a "fast track", with construction to be complete by the close of 1991. The estimated cost to construct this first segment of the Creek Turnpike was $85 million (about $187 million in 2024 dollars). Initially, the highway was planned to have an 18-foot-wide (5.5 m) median with a Jersey barrier, which would meet minimum AASHTO requirements of 10 feet (3.0 m). Later plans expanded this to a 46-foot (14 m) grass median. Four toll plazas were planned, with one mainline plaza collecting a fifty-cent toll no matter what distance was traveled.

=== Tulsa requests changes ===
Tulsa mayor Rodger Randle's committee on the Creek Turnpike submitted a report to OTA on April 13, 1989, requesting that the agency make 47 changes to the turnpike. Among the changes proposed by the city was a shift in the route of 100 feet (30 m) to the north between Yale Avenue and Sheridan Road to accommodate a greenway along both sides of the turnpike. The committee also recommended wider overpasses to accommodate future expansion of surface streets such as Delaware Avenue, moving the mainline toll plaza farther east to minimize impact on the surrounding area, and better compliance with local flood prevention ordinances. In addition, the report suggested better pedestrian access, including pedestrian bridges on both sides of the Arkansas River and near Hunter Park, and various sidewalks and pedestrian tunnels.

OTA immediately agreed that some of the more minor changes to the turnpike's plans could be made, but expressed doubt that more major alterations would be made. Several of the proposed changes, including the greenway, were highlighted as major expenses. Nonetheless, OTA agreed to evaluate the city's proposals. Board member (and future Tulsa mayor) Dewey F. Bartlett, Jr., said "We are not set in stone, but it's a matter of economics." Mayor Randle stated his desire for a written agreement regarding the changes to be drawn up and signed by the city and OTA before ground was broken on the turnpike.

On June 18, 1989, OTA officials announced that the majority of the city's proposed amendments to the Creek Turnpike would be incorporated into the design. The alterations added $6 million (about $13 million in 2024 dollars) to the cost of the project. However, the revised plan required the demolition of only 41 houses, six fewer than originally planned. Further alterations were negotiated throughout the latter half of 1989, with OTA and Tulsa reaching an agreement on December 29. The plans were adapted to include flood and noise control provisions. To meet these requirements, the highway would be lowered, with some sections below-grade. In exchange, the City of Tulsa agreed to pay $1.3 million in annual maintenance costs until 2020. The deal also included a land swap, with the city giving OTA land from Hunter Park and receiving land along the right-of-way to construct recreational trails.

=== Construction ===
OTA began filing condemnation suits for homes within the Creek Turnpike's proposed right-of-way on June 30, 1989. Condemnation, the process by which a government exercises its powers of eminent domain, was required for OTA to seize properties necessary for the project when owners refused OTA buyout offers. Bids were opened for Creek Turnpike construction projects that November. Contracts for utility relocation, grading, and drainage work were awarded at OTA's November 16 meeting. Meanwhile, work began on the condemned properties, with contractors moving or demolishing houses on the affected lots from December 1989 to January 1990.

Drainage work was in progress by late February 1990. Construction was underway on turnpike bridges by March 1990. While federal environmental permits were being secured, the construction process was delayed; by October 1990, the bridge construction was only at the point that had been planned to have been completed in May, and grading and paving work had yet to begin. In December 1990, contractors on the Creek Turnpike project were given "notice to proceed", as the permits had been granted. By that time, construction had only progressed to the point that it was supposed to have been at in late July. Nevertheless, by April 1991, OTA's chief executive officer, Richard Ridings, described the project as "moving very well" and said "My own personal opinion is it's up to the contractors. If they want to produce, it can be open by the end of the year."

The first section of the Creek Turnpike to open was a 3.6-mile (5.8 km) segment from Delaware Avenue to its eastern terminus at Memorial Drive, which opened to traffic at 7 p.m. on March 13, 1992. Tolls were waived until 12:01 a.m. on March 16. The next section to the west, from Elm Street in Jenks to Delaware Avenue, including the Arkansas River bridge, opened the afternoon of April 15. The final leg of the first segment of the turnpike, from US-75 to Elm Street, opened at noon on July 30. The Creek Turnpike was initially posted with a 55-mile-per-hour (89 km/h) speed limit, due to the National Maximum Speed Limit law then in effect. Traffic levels on the new highway were about double what was expected, with an average of 9,000 vehicles per day using the turnpike in August 1992; a 1988 estimate predicted only 3,000 to 5,000 vehicles would use the road each day.

=== Opposition ===
The Creek Turnpike was opposed by area residents from its conception. Forming a group called "Tulsans Against Turnpikes", around 220 citizens gathered at a meeting on February 16, 1989, to discuss the proposed toll road. Opponents to the turnpike cited detrimental effects to their community and to the environment as their concerns. "What I am concerned about is that it changes the complexion of south Tulsa. It would no longer be a residential area," said Tom Taylor, an area resident. Some residents also complained that the proposed turnpike would mainly serve through traffic, despite OTA estimates that south Tulsa residents would make up 90% of the road's userbase.

On March 22, 1989, three Will Rogers Turnpike tollbooth attendants made a surprise appearance at a Tulsans Against Turnpikes press conference to offer support to the opposition movement, expressing dissatisfaction with working conditions while manning the turnpike. The three attendants also gave examples of firsthand experience with turnpike customers that had convinced them that motorists were not as supportive of turnpikes as OTA executives believed. OTA responded to their employees' remarks by highlighting an Occupational Safety and Health Administration study that found that the toll gate that the three attendants worked at met all safety standards.

In late June 1989, opponents of the turnpike boycotted local businesses that were members of the Metropolitan Tulsa Chamber of Commerce, which was in favor of the turnpike. Some turnpike protesters removed their names from the customer list at Mazzio's Italian Eatery on June 23. On June 24, about forty protesters picketed the Bank of Oklahoma, and around six closed their accounts. The chief executives of both businesses were on the board of the Chamber of Commerce. In response to the boycott, Mayor Randle issued a statement accusing Tulsans Against Turnpikes of "seeking to wage economic coercion against businesses" and described their tactics as "[working] as a kind of economic blackmail to silence debate", as well as "allowing differences of opinion to degenerate into intimidation against those who have taken public stands unpopular with [Tulsans Against Turnpikes]". Randle also canceled a planned meeting with the group, refusing to meet with them until they ceased the boycott. A Tulsans Against Turnpikes board member publicly replied to the mayor's statement by denying that a boycott was taking place, stating that the group only recommended that members not do business with Mazzio's and Bank of Oklahoma because of their support for the Creek Turnpike project via their activity with the Chamber of Commerce. He also suggested that Randle was simply looking for an excuse to avoid the meeting.

The environmental group Greenpeace became involved with the opposition movement in October 1989. Holding a joint rally with Tulsans Against Turnpikes and several environmental groups at Hunter Park, a Greenpeace spokeswoman said on October 20 that the Creek Turnpike's construction "will be setting up Oklahoma as a hazardous waste dumping ground". Greenpeace's regional coordinator was scheduled to speak at an area library on the same day, but his appearance was canceled when the organization's bus ran out of fuel. A local resident at the Hunter Park forum was quoted as being concerned that the turnpike may allow eastern states such as New York to ship AIDS-contaminated freight through the area.

In November 1989, Jenks resident Gary Medlin and two Jenks city councilmen drafted a letter to OTA requesting that the agency cease all work on the Creek Turnpike. The letter was approved by the Jenks City Council on November 20. The letter also included a petition in opposition to the turnpike with over 1,000 signatures.

A grand jury petition, bearing over 1,400 signatures across 134 pages, was filed with the Tulsa County election board by Medlin on November 6, 1989. The petition alleged that local and state officials violated the state's open meetings, conspiracy, and conflict of interest laws while planning the turnpike. The election board certified the petition as meeting the required threshold of 1,000 signatures on December 15. Work on the turnpike continued despite the investigation. After meeting for seven days, on January 19, 1990, the grand jury determined that there was no evidence to support the allegations and no need for further investigation.

Some protesters resorted to illegal means to demonstrate their opposition to the project. In December 1989, trees and shrubbery on condemned lots were destroyed in an attempt to prevent them from being transplanted by landscapers. A field office belonging to M. J. Lee Construction Co., a contractor working on the project, was burglarized on March 4, 1990. The perpetrators stole or destroyed tools and poured oil on planning documents. A week later, the fuel lines on heavy equipment were slashed. On the night of April 26, several vehicles at a Creek Turnpike worksite belonging to M. J. Lee were vandalized; the vandals smashed windshields and headlights, stole fuel caps, and dumped mud into the fuel tanks. Messages reading "Death to OTA", "Death to [Governor Henry] Bellmon" and "Death to Bartlett" (who had recently also become a Tulsa city councilman) were written in mud on the side of a water truck at the site. The vice president of the firm emphasized that the company alone bore the brunt of the estimated $10,000 (equivalent to $21,000 in 2024) financial loss, not OTA, and offered a $1,000 reward for information leading to the prosecution of the responsible party. Construction signage was also removed or covered up with Tulsans Against Turnpikes signs, and survey markers were relocated. Tulsans Against Turnpikes publicly condemned the vandalism, offering an additional $500 reward for information. A member of the group's board stated "We deplore this kind of cowardly, illegal action. There is no reason for some sick person to take out frustrations on the contractor[...]." In response to the vandalism, Tulsa police launched an investigation, and OTA stated that Oklahoma Highway Patrol officers would be on patrol in the construction areas. On August 11, 1990, a contractor arriving for work discovered a vandal attempting to break the window of a crane. As the employee approached the crane, four people fled the scene. The employee was able to detain two of them, both aged eighteen, until police arrived and cited them for misdemeanor malicious mischief.

==== Lawsuit ====
The Oklahoma Turnpike Authority was exempt from requirements to have a federal environmental impact study (EIS) conducted on the Creek Turnpike project. As part of their opposition to the turnpike, Tulsans Against Turnpikes challenged this right. The group announced in April 1989 that if the Environmental Protection Agency (EPA), U.S. Department of Transportation (USDOT), and U.S. Department of Defense (DOD) did not force OTA to conduct an EIS within 60 days they would sue the three federal agencies. Tulsans Against Turnpikes, joined by an area homeowners' association, John Reidel (a homeowner whose property was condemned by OTA and had filed previous suits as early as the 1950s to stop the turnpike's construction), and several other affected individuals, filed the suit in the U.S. District Court for the Northern District of Oklahoma on August 10. Defendants in the suit included the federal agencies, state transportation and environmental agencies, and the city of Tulsa. That November, Tulsans Against Turnpikes filed a motion requesting an injunction against further work on the turnpike.

On January 27, 1990, U.S. District Judge Thomas Rutherford Brett dismissed seven of the nine claims before him, and on March 24, the plaintiffs filed a motion to drop the two remaining claims in hopes that the judge would reconsider the claims already dismissed. The plaintiffs also filed for a restraining order to halt construction activities. In support of their filings, the turnpike opponents alleged that OTA was illegally dumping material into waterways. OTA responded by producing U.S. Army Corps of Engineers (USACE) documentation showing that no illegal discharge had taken place, and that USACE had not issued any cease and desist orders due to unlawful activity. OTA argued that the plaintiffs' requests for a restraining order and reconsideration of the dismissed claims were invalid because there was no change in their legal authority or the facts surrounding the case to warrant such a reconsideration.

At a hearing on May 22, 1990, Judge Brett announced his refusal to reconsider the seven dismissed claims, ending the lawsuit, and ruled all remaining pending motions moot. At the hearing, Brett said that the issue at the heart of the suit was the highway's effect on area residents. While this was a legitimate interest, the judge said, it was not covered by the environmental laws under which the plaintiffs chose to challenge the project. Brett also pointed out that the environmental questions were at that time under review by the appropriate federal agencies.

=== Environmental concerns ===
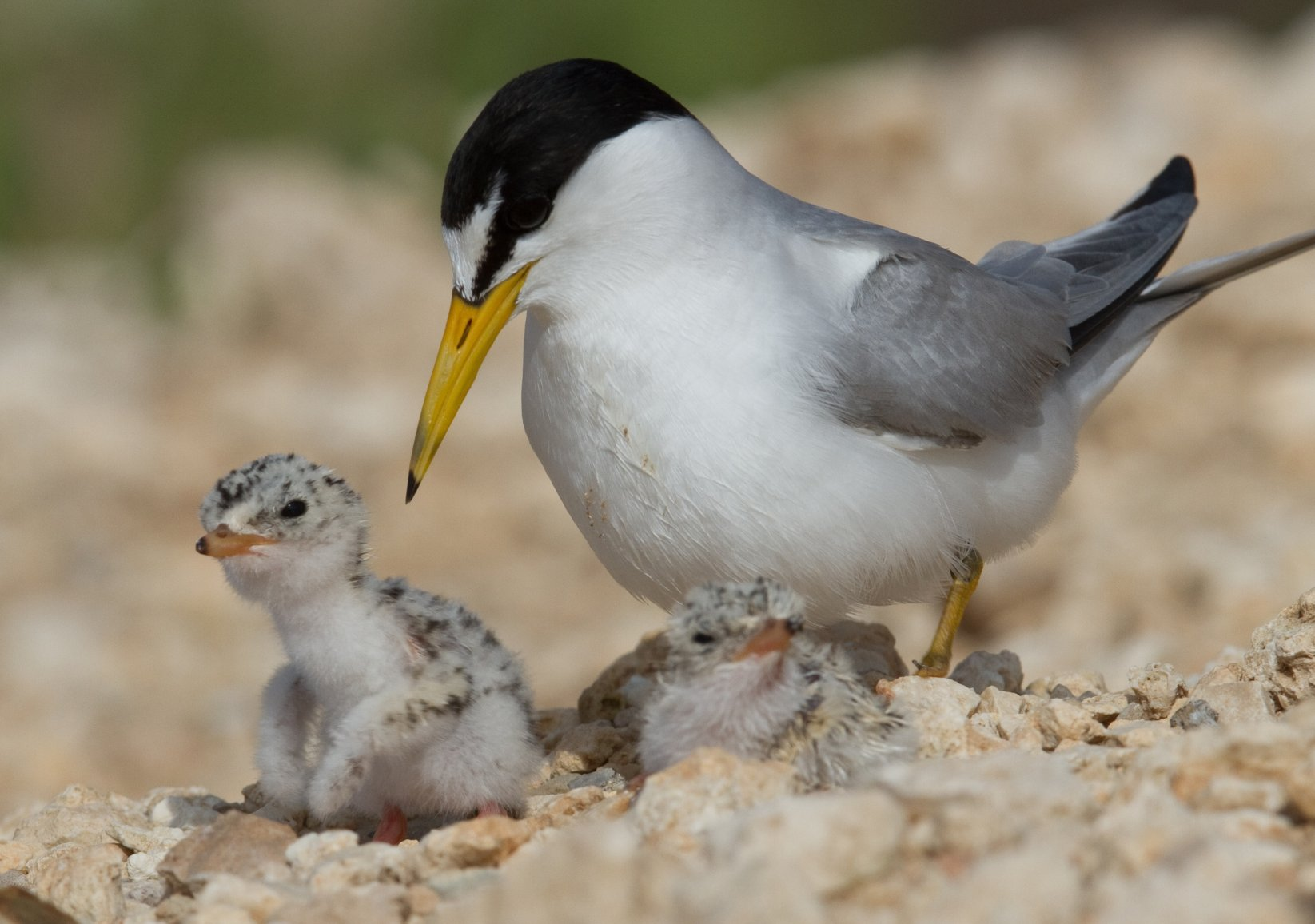
Presence of the endangered interior least tern near the path of the Creek Turnpike caused worries its construction would have to be delayed.

Initial turnpike plans included environmental mitigation features to reduce the amount of disruption the finished road would cause to the local environment. In the Jenks area, OTA planned to replace destroyed wetlands with new wetlands of equal or greater size. Landscapers were expected to plant two trees for every one removed to build the road. In March 1990, these plans were augmented to provide wetlands mitigation at a rate of three to one, for a total of 45 acres (18 ha) of new wetlands. Additionally, 25 acres (10 ha) of pasture would be allowed to revert to its natural state to create "dedicated natural succession areas."

On July 21, 1989, OTA approved a contract to transplant approximately 290 live trees in the path of the turnpike to locations along the edge of the right-of-way. There, the trees would serve as a barrier between the road and the surrounding properties, masking the road from view and muffling the sounds of traffic. A Norman landscaping firm performed the work, which included thirty months of maintenance, for a total cost of $288.50 per tree (equivalent to $633 in 2024 dollars).

The Federal Emergency Management Agency (FEMA) objected to the construction of the Creek Turnpike in a letter dated January 30, 1990. FEMA felt that documentation on how the project would affect the floodplains in the area was lacking, preventing local authorities from requesting updates to floodplain maps, which were necessary to keep their communities enrolled in flood insurance programs. OTA's attorney stated that the requisite information had been provided to local officials, and it was not OTA's responsibility to ensure that they forwarded the information on to FEMA.

A Tulsa-area supervisor with the U.S. Fish and Wildlife Service (FWS) commented upon environmental issues pertaining to the Creek Turnpike in a 19-page letter to the U.S. Army Corps of Engineers dated February 9, 1990. USACE was responsible for issuing three essential permits (which OTA had applied for on November 6, 1989) that would allow construction to continue, and was required to consider input from the service. In the letter, supervisor Stephen Forsythe recommended that the permits be denied and further studies conducted into alternate routes for the turnpike and the environmental impact on roads that connected to the turnpike. However, USACE only had the authority to review the impacts the Creek Turnpike itself made on wetland areas. Governor Bellmon publicly criticized Forsythe for focusing on concerns beyond USACE's jurisdiction. Bellmon's Transportation Secretary, Neal McCaleb, publicly stated "I think [Forsythe] is out of line[...] and would say so to Mr. Forsythe." Bellmon and McCaleb discussed the letter in a private meeting with the Secretary of the Interior, Manuel Lujan, although Lujan neither commented nor committed to any action regarding the letter. In response to Bellmon's criticism of the letter, Tulsans Against Turnpikes issued a public statement, saying "Running behind closed political doors like that demonstrates the governor is an environmental hypocrite," contrasting his statements with a letter he wrote assuring a constituent in Jenks that the project would be "the most aesthetically pleasing and environmentally sound facility that can be constructed".

In a letter sent to OTA in March 1990, USACE identified issues with the Creek Turnpike project, such as modifications to Polecat Creek's channel, impacts on the Arkansas River floodplain and levee system near Jenks, and loss of 14.8 acres (6.0 ha) of wetlands. In two other letters sent in May 1990, USACE requested alterations to the project, detailing further concerns about destruction of a unique type of wetland near the turnpike's planned intersection with Yale Avenue, OTA's plan to temporarily drain Mill Creek Bridge Pond, and emergency access to homes only accessible by crossing the pond on a wooden bridge. USACE warned that, should the changes the corps requested not be made, the turnpike plans may violate federal law, which would result in USACE withholding the necessary permits. The corps also required "absolute assurance" that new wetlands constructed as part of the project's mitigation efforts would not be built on land that was formerly the site of a landfill. On March 29, USACE held a public hearing as part of the permit process. The hearing had around 500 attendees, with over fifty of them giving five-minute speeches against the turnpike. One speaker compared the highway's environmental impact to that of the wreck of the oil tanker Exxon Valdez. No citizens spoke out in favor of the project.

OTA announced plans to include sound barriers at three points along the turnpike in April 1990. The locations were recommended by a report commissioned by OTA, using guidelines published by the Federal Highway Administration (FHWA). While another thirteen locations were likely to have similar noise levels as the three sites selected to receive barriers, abatement was not considered at those locations because they did not meet other criteria, including minimum population density. Although OTA was not required to follow FHWA guidelines on the Creek Turnpike because it was not a federally funded project, it opted to do so anyway.

Another letter, dated June 21, 1990, was sent by FWS to USACE, reporting that at least eight interior least terns, an endangered species, had been found on a small island in the Arkansas River approximately 2,000 feet (610 m) south of the site of the proposed turnpike bridge. Although the bridge was not yet under construction at the time, the anticipated eighteen-month period of bridge construction had the possibility of interfering with the terns' nesting period, which runs from mid-May to mid-August. FWS was also in favor of requiring OTA to prepare a full EIS, a process that could have taken up to three years.

Further delays on the Creek Turnpike project appeared inevitable in October 1990, as a new area meeting the federal definition of a wetland was discovered in the path of the turnpike. OTA officials did not bring the area to USACE's attention because they did not believe it met the criteria to be considered a wetland. Frustration mounted after the find; rumors surfaced that OTA was considering canceling the Creek Turnpike and shifting the remaining funds to turnpike projects in the Oklahoma City area. In an interview after an OTA meeting, chairman John Kilpatrick was quoted as saying "God only knows when [the Creek Turnpike will] be completed," describing the project as a "total disaster" and commenting "If we had it all to do over again, we wouldn't do that project." OTA was concerned about the financial impact of USACE's delay in issuing the required permits; each day after the planned opening date that the project ran late added $20,000 (approximately $42,000 in 2024 dollars) to the total cost of the project. USACE finally issued the permit on November 15, over a year after OTA applied for it.

One stipulation the USACE placed on the permit, however, was that no work in the Arkansas riverbed could take place after May 1 if it would interfere with the interior least tern nesting period, which was possible if the birds selected nesting sites around the bridge site. As a result, OTA worked to complete the bridge as quickly as possible to avoid the possibility of having to suspend the construction. By April 1991, work in the riverbed was mostly complete, with the remaining work on the bridge posing no threat to the terns.

=== Extensions ===
The possibility of extending the Creek Turnpike beyond its original termini at US-75 and Memorial Drive was raised as early as 1993. On May 28, 1993, Governor David Walters announced a proposed $3.1 billion (around $6.1 billion in 2024 dollars) turnpike package, one part of which was the extension of the Creek Turnpike to the Turner Turnpike to the west and the Will Rogers Turnpike in the east. As a result of negotiations between Walters, other lawmakers, and OTA, the package was ultimately pared down to $675 million (about $1.29 billion in 2024 dollars); among the cuts was the eastern extension of the Creek Turnpike. This version of the package was approved by OTA on August 18, 1994. The package was ultimately killed almost two months later, when the Legislative Bond Oversight Commission voted 4–2 to stop the sale of the bonds associated with the project on October 3. Reasons for opposition to the package were varied, including concerns over OTA's debt level, toll increases necessary to fund the package, the state of the bond market, a federal investigation examining previous OTA bond sales, lack of details given about the package, the size of the package, and the proposed method by which the bonds would be sold.

Another Creek Turnpike expansion proposal, connecting it again to the Turner Turnpike in the west, but only extending it as far as the Muskogee Turnpike in the east, was put forward by Walters's successor, Governor Frank Keating, in 1996. This proposal, accompanied by a proposed extension to the Kilpatrick Turnpike in Oklahoma City, was to be funded by increasing tolls by 10 percent statewide in 1999. Keating's turnpike package, too, encountered trouble from the Legislative Bond Oversight Commission. The body unanimously voted on July 25, 1996, to postpone an up-or-down vote on the projects, which together carried a price tag of $525 million (approximately $967 million in 2024 dollars), until more information was made available to its members. Keating declared the package dead in response to the commission's action.

The Creek Turnpike extensions resurfaced in a 1998 turnpike expansion plan. OTA approved a $724 million (about $1.3 billion in 2024 dollars) bond package at its meeting on January 9, 1998. This package, which carried the support of both Governor Keating and legislative leaders, included a 25.9-mile (41.7 km) extension of the Creek Turnpike to the Turner and Will Rogers turnpikes, extension of the Kilpatrick Turnpike, and a new toll road which would become the H.E. Bailey Turnpike Norman Spur. The plan, which was to be funded by a 15% systemwide toll increase, was approved by both the Legislative Bond Oversight Commission and Executive Bond Oversight Commission on January 29, 1998.

Construction of the portion of the highway between the eastern terminus and the Muskogee Turnpike, known as the Broken Arrow south loop, was scheduled to begin in May 1999 and be completed in January 2001. The section from the Muskogee Turnpike north to the Will Rogers Turnpike was to begin construction in September 1999 and be completed in January 2002. Unlike the section of the turnpike built in the early 1990s, this section was expected to displace few residents; the city of Broken Arrow had purchased much of the right-of-way ahead of time to preserve the corridor for the expected turnpike.

While construction of the other two sections of the turnpike ran according to schedule, progress on the Broken Arrow south loop lagged behind. Cost overruns due to higher-than-estimated land acquisition costs caused delays as the project was revised to save money. The project was stalled further by the May 3, 1999, tornado outbreak, as utility contractors were pulled off the project to contribute to service restoration efforts in the Oklahoma City area. By August 1999, the south loop was six months behind schedule. Despite the cost-saving measures, the south loop remained over budget by $16 million (around $27.6 million in 2024 dollars) in July 2000. The western extension was also over budget; OTA discovered over 100 abandoned oil wells that needed to be capped and leftover piping in the turnpike corridor. Budget overruns on the western leg of the turnpike were $5 million (about $8.6 million in 2024 dollars) in July 2000.

The western extension was the first to open to traffic. Following a brief dedication ceremony attended by Governor Keating, Transportation Secretary McCaleb, and OTA board member Bartlett, the highway opened on December 15, 2000. As with the first section of the turnpike, tolls were waived for the weekend; the road was free until noon on December 18. The south loop was opened in two segments. The first, from US-64/US-169 to South Elm Place in Broken Arrow, opened at 3 p.m. August 15, 2001. The new segment remained toll-free until 7 a.m. August 20. A rainy September pushed back the opening of the other half of the south loop by two months. The second half of the south loop, from Elm Place to New Orleans Street, opened at 2 p.m. April 15, 2002. The final segment of the extension, connecting New Orleans Street and the Muskogee Turnpike to the Will Rogers Turnpike, was scheduled to open on August 16 of that year.

=== Later history ===
A new interchange at Aspen Avenue in Broken Arrow opened on May 18, 2012. The project was completed three weeks ahead of schedule at a cost of $6.137 million, of which $1.75 million was paid by OTA, with the rest coming from the City of Broken Arrow. The new interchange was expected to attract retail, dining, and entertainment development to the area around the interchange.

A construction project that started in May 2012 expanded the turnpike to six lanes total, or three lanes in each direction, between US-75 and Memorial Drive. Throughout the project, speed limits along the turnpike were reduced to 55 miles per hour (89 km/h). The project was completed in October 2013.

The Creek Turnpike originally bore no numbered designation. On March 10, 2014, the Oklahoma Transportation Commission unanimously approved a motion to apply the SH-364 designation to the turnpike.

On April 7, 2025, the Oklahoma Transportation Commission unanimously approved a motion to apply the I-644 designation to the turnpike subject to approval by AASHTO.

== Tolls ==
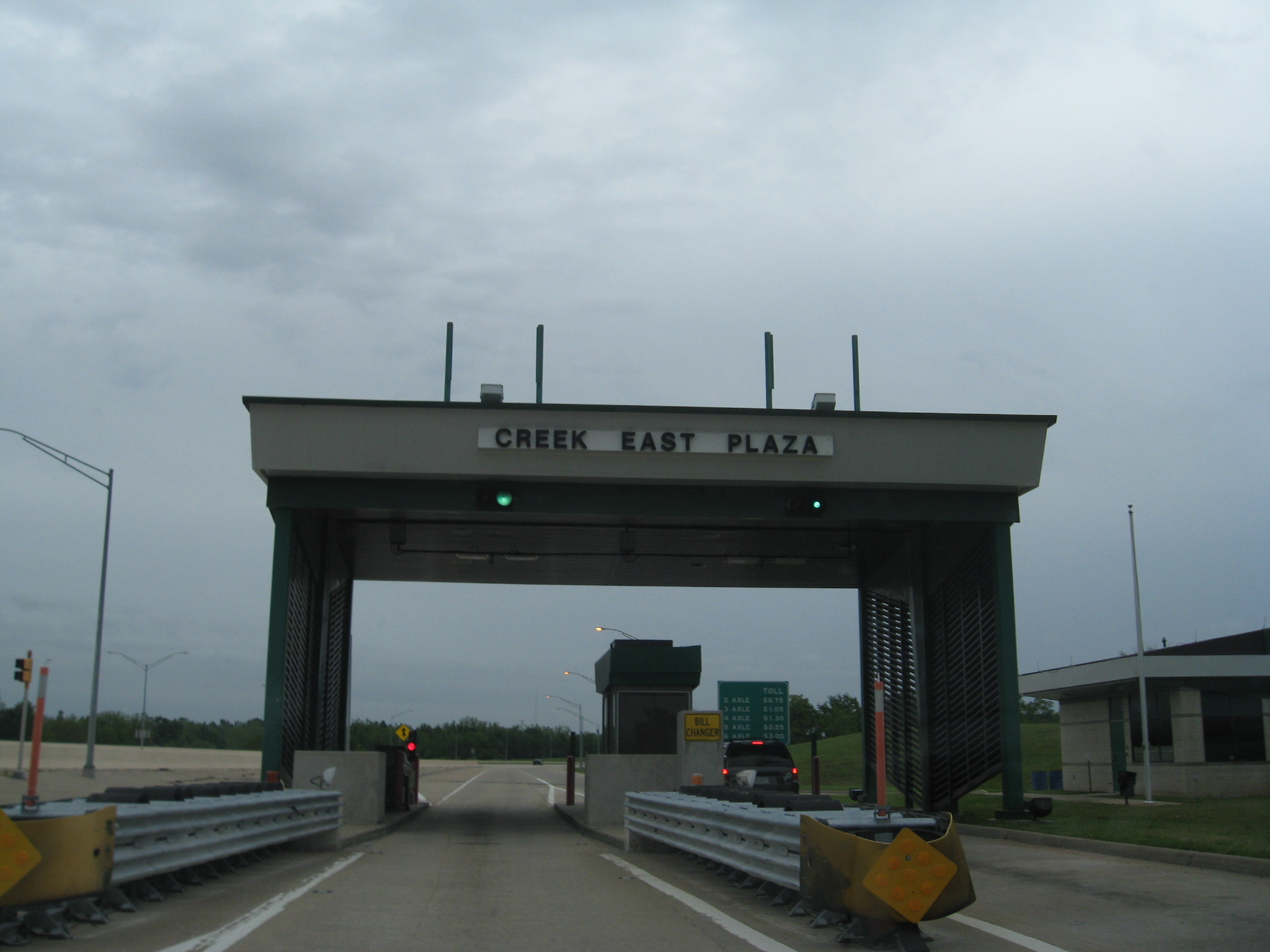
The Creek East Toll Plaza prior to the adoption of cashless tolling

The Creek Turnpike uses all-electronic tolling since February 8, 2023. Cash is no longer accepted. Tolls are instead paid using PikePass or PlatePay, which uses automatic licence plate recognition to send a bill to the vehicle's registered owner. As of 2025, motorists driving two-axle vehicles (such as cars and motorcycles) pay tolls of $3.46 if using PikePass or $7.72 if using PlatePay to drive the entire length of the Creek Turnpike. Drivers of vehicles with more than two axles, such as semi-trucks, pay higher tolls; six-axle vehicles are charged rates of $12.25 with PikePass or $20.05 with PlatePay. PikePass customers receive discounted rates compared to PlatePay at all toll plazas.

Tolls are collected at three mainline toll plazas along the turnpike, one between the US-75 and Peoria–Elm interchanges, one west of the Olive Avenue interchange, and one (labeled as the Creek East plaza) south of the 31st Street South interchange. There are also toll plazas at some entrance and exit ramps in places where shunpiking would otherwise be possible. Since opening, all toll plazas have had open road tolling lanes, which were previously dedicated for PikePass tagholders but are now used by all traffic. Previously, cash-paying customers exited to the right at each toll plaza to pay at traditional toll booths. Cash collection became automated in early 1996; customers deposited exact coins into automatic toll baskets in lieu of paying human toll collectors. Bill changers capable of changing $1 and $5 bills were available at some mainline toll plazas, as well as machines that produced receipts for customers requiring them.

== Exit list ==
County	Location	mi	km	Exit	Destinations	Notes
Creek	Sapulpa	0.0	0.0		I-44 Toll west / Turner Turnpike west – Oklahoma City	Western terminus; exit 218 on I-44 / Turnpike
Creek	Sapulpa	0.3	0.48		SH-66 – Tulsa, Sapulpa	Westbound exit and eastbound entrance
Creek		1.3	2.1		Hickory Hill Road	Eastbound exit and westbound entrance
Creek		3.0	4.8		South 49th West Avenue	Westbound exit and eastbound entrance
Tulsa	Jenks	4.7	7.6		US 75 – Tulsa, Glenpool	
Tulsa	Jenks	6.1	9.8	Toll plaza		
Tulsa	Jenks	6.8	10.9		Peoria Avenue / Elm Street	
Tulsa	Tulsa	8.6	13.8		Riverside Parkway	
Tulsa	Tulsa	10.6	17.1		Yale Avenue	
Tulsa	Tulsa	11.4	18.3		US 64 east (Memorial Drive) US 169 begins	Toll-free exit; western end of US-64/US-169 concurrency; southern terminus of US-169
Tulsa	Tulsa	11.6	18.7		Mingo Road	Toll-free exit; eastbound exit only
Tulsa	Tulsa	12.2	19.6		US 64 west / US 169 north – Tulsa	Toll-free exit; eastern end of US-64/US-169 concurrency
Tulsa	Broken Arrow	12.8	20.6		East 96th Street South	Toll-free exit; eastbound exit and entrance
Tulsa	Broken Arrow	14.6	23.5	Toll plaza		
Tulsa	Broken Arrow	15.4	24.8		South Olive Avenue	
Tulsa	Broken Arrow	16.5	26.6		South Aspen Avenue	
Tulsa	Broken Arrow	17.5	28.2		South Elm Place	
Tulsa–Wagoner county line	Broken Arrow	19.6	31.5		County Line Road	
Wagoner	Broken Arrow	21.8	35.1		New Orleans Street	
Wagoner	Broken Arrow	23.0	37.0		SH-51 – Coweta	No entrance ramps; future full interchange
Wagoner	Broken Arrow	23.9	38.5		Muskogee Turnpike to SH-51 west – Muskogee, Tulsa	Cloverleaf interchange; Muskogee Turnpike west not signed
Wagoner	Broken Arrow	25.1	40.4		Kenosha Street	
Wagoner	Tulsa	27.7	44.6	28	East 51st Street South	
Wagoner	Tulsa	28.7	46.2	Creek East Toll Plaza		
Wagoner	Tulsa	29.9	48.1	31	East 31st Street South	
Wagoner	Tulsa	31.3	50.4	32	East 11th Street South	
Rogers	Fair Oaks	33.1	53.3	33	I-44 west / US 412 to SH-66 – Tulsa, Chouteau, Siloam Springs	Signed as exits 33A (east) and 33B (west) eastbound, exits 33A (east) and 34 (west) westbound
Rogers	Fair Oaks	33.1	53.3		I-44 Toll east / Will Rogers Turnpike east	Continuation east
1.000 mi = 1.609 km; 1.000 km = 0.621 mi: Concurrency terminus; Incomplete access; Tolled
