= U.S. Route 64 in Oklahoma =

Highway in Oklahoma

U.S. Highway 64
- US 64 highlighted in red

Route information
- Maintained by ODOT
- Length: 591.17 mi (951.40 km)
- Existed: November 11, 1926–present

Major junctions
- West end: US 56 / US 64 / US 412 at the New Mexico state line near Clayton, NM
- I-35 / Future I-42 / US 412 Toll / Cimarron Turnpike near Perry; I-44 / SH-66 in Tulsa; I-40 in Sallisaw and Roland
- East end: US 64 at the Arkansas state line in Moffett

Location
- Country: United States
- State: Oklahoma
- Counties: Cimarron, Texas, Beaver, Harper, Woods, Alfalfa, Grant, Garfield, Noble, Pawnee, Osage, Tulsa, Wagoner, Muskogee, Sequoyah

Highway system
- United States Numbered Highway System; List; Special; Divided; Oklahoma State Highway System; Interstate; US; State; Turnpikes
← SH-63	→ SH-65

U.S. Route 64 (US 64) is a U.S. highway running from the Four Corners area to the Outer Banks of North Carolina. Between these two points, the highway passes through the entire width of Oklahoma; a total of 591.17 miles (951.40 km) of US 64 lies in the state of Oklahoma. US 64 enters the state from New Mexico, crossing the line between the two states between Clayton, New Mexico and Boise City in Cimarron County. The route runs the full length of the Oklahoma Panhandle, then serves the northernmost tier of counties in the main body of the state before dipping southeastward to Tulsa, the state's second-largest city. From Tulsa, the highway continues southeast, leaving Oklahoma just west of Fort Smith, Arkansas. In addition to Tulsa, US 64 serves fifteen Oklahoma counties and the cities of Guymon, Woodward, Enid and Muskogee.

US 64 has been a part of the United States Numbered Highways system from the program's inception in 1926. US 64's route has remained roughly the same since then, although it has undergone alterations several times, mainly changing its course through towns and moving the highway designation to higher-capacity expressways and freeways.

== Route description ==
=== The Panhandle ===
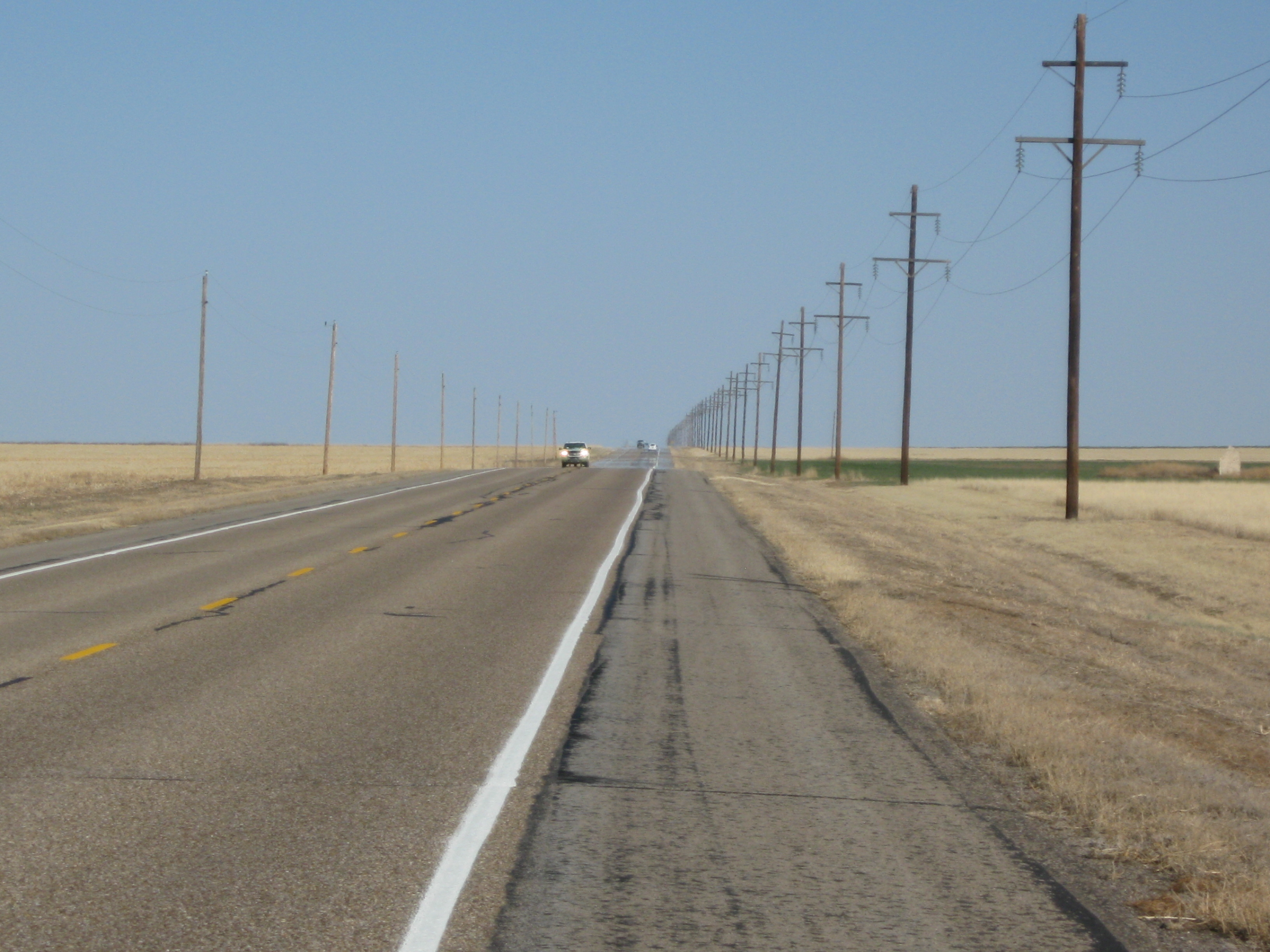
US 64 east of Boise City

U.S. Route 64 crosses the New Mexico–Oklahoma state line northeast of Clayton, New Mexico, concurrent with US 56 and US 412. The three highways enter the state just north of the extreme southwest corner of Cimarron County, the westernmost tip of the Oklahoma Panhandle. The highways head northeast, passing through disconnected parcels of the Rita Blanca National Grassland. The first town US 56, US 64 and US 412 encounter in Oklahoma is unincorporated Felt of which they skirt the northern edge. The highways then cross the Beaver River before intersecting US 385, which joins the other three highways in a concurrency as they approach Boise City, the county seat. In Boise City, the highways reach a traffic circle which surrounds the Cimarron County Courthouse. At this traffic circle, US 56, US 64 and US 412 all turn east while US 385 splits away to the north. State Highway 3 (SH-3) enters the circle from the north and leaves from the east, following US 64, while SH-325 begins at the circle and heads west toward Kenton. East of town, US 56/US 64/US 412/SH-3 have an interchange with US 287 which bypasses Boise City to the east. Six miles (9.7 km) northeast of here, US 56 splits away from the other highways; it continues northeast, while US 64/US 412/SH-3 turn onto a due east course. The routes intersect SH-171 eight miles (13 km) east of the split.

Approximately twelve miles (19 km) east of the SH-171 junction, US 64/US 412/SH-3 cross into Texas County. Seven miles (11 km) east of the county line, at unincorporated Four Corners, SH-95 joins the concurrency; it splits away after following the other three routes for five miles (8.0 km). The next major highway junction lies eighteen miles (29 km) to the east, where SH-136 joins with US 64/US 412/SH-3 as the highways turn south toward Guymon. The four highways cross the Beaver River once again before entering that city, Texas County's seat and the largest city in the Panhandle, on Main Street. In Guymon, US 64 splits away to the east along NE 12th Street, while US 412 and state highways 3 and 136 continue south. US 64 is accompanied on 12th Street by truck routes for the latter three highways. At the intersection with US 54, the truck routes turn southwest, while US 64 turns northeast, following US 54 out of town US 54/US 64 continue northeast through eastern Texas County, running parallel to a Union Pacific rail line. After crossing the Beaver River (the only crossing for US 54, but the third for US 64), the highways cut through the northwest corner of the town of Optima. Continuing northeast, US 54 and US 64 run just southeast of Panoma before coming to Hooker. There, US 54/US 64 serve as the northern terminus of SH-94. After the SH-94 junction, US 54 continues northeast toward Tyrone and Liberal, Kansas, while US 64 splits off onto a due east course. The road passes south of Baker before leaving Texas County.

Next, US 64 passes through Beaver County, the easternmost of the three counties forming the Oklahoma Panhandle. About four miles (6.4 km) east of the county line, US 64 reaches the town of Turpin; here, the highway begins a concurrency with US 83. Approximately three miles (4.8 km) north of Turpin, the two highways come to a junction with US 270. US 83 and westbound US 270 continue north from this junction toward Liberal, while US 64 and US 270 eastbound form a concurrency heading due east. Passing north of Floris, the highways proceed east for about 18 1/2 miles (29.8 km) without any curves or junctions with other highways before reaching Forgan. East of Forgan lies a highway junction with SH-23—here, US 270 splits away from US 64, turning south along SH-23 en route to the county seat, Beaver. SH-23 joins US 64 to form a one-mile (1.6 km) concurrency before also splitting away toward its northern terminus at the Kansas line. US 64 does not intersect any other highways in the 29-mile (47 km) segment of highway in Beaver County east of the SH-23 junction. As it zig-zags southeastward, the highway passes through the towns of Knowles and Gate. Three miles (4.8 km) east of Gate, the highway crosses the Beaver–Harper county line, the eastern boundary of the Oklahoma Pandhandle and enters the main body of the state.

=== Northern Oklahoma ===
Just two miles (3.2 km) east of its entry into Harper County, US 412 begins a concurrency with US 283. The two highways pass through Rosston, then US 283 splits away to the south toward Laverne. US 64 continues alone on a due east course for eight miles (13 km) before reaching the northern terminus of SH-46. The highway continues east, then veers northeast, and turns back to the east before meeting up with US 183 on the south side of Buffalo, the county seat. US 64 turns north at this intersection, overlapping US 183 through town. The two routes part ways northeast of town, with US 183 continuing on a northerly course toward Kansas and US 64 turning east once again. On the east end of the county, US 64 begins another concurrency, this time with SH-34. About 2 1/2 miles (4.0 km) east of the junction, the two highways cross the Cimarron River, which forms the northeastern boundary of Harper County.

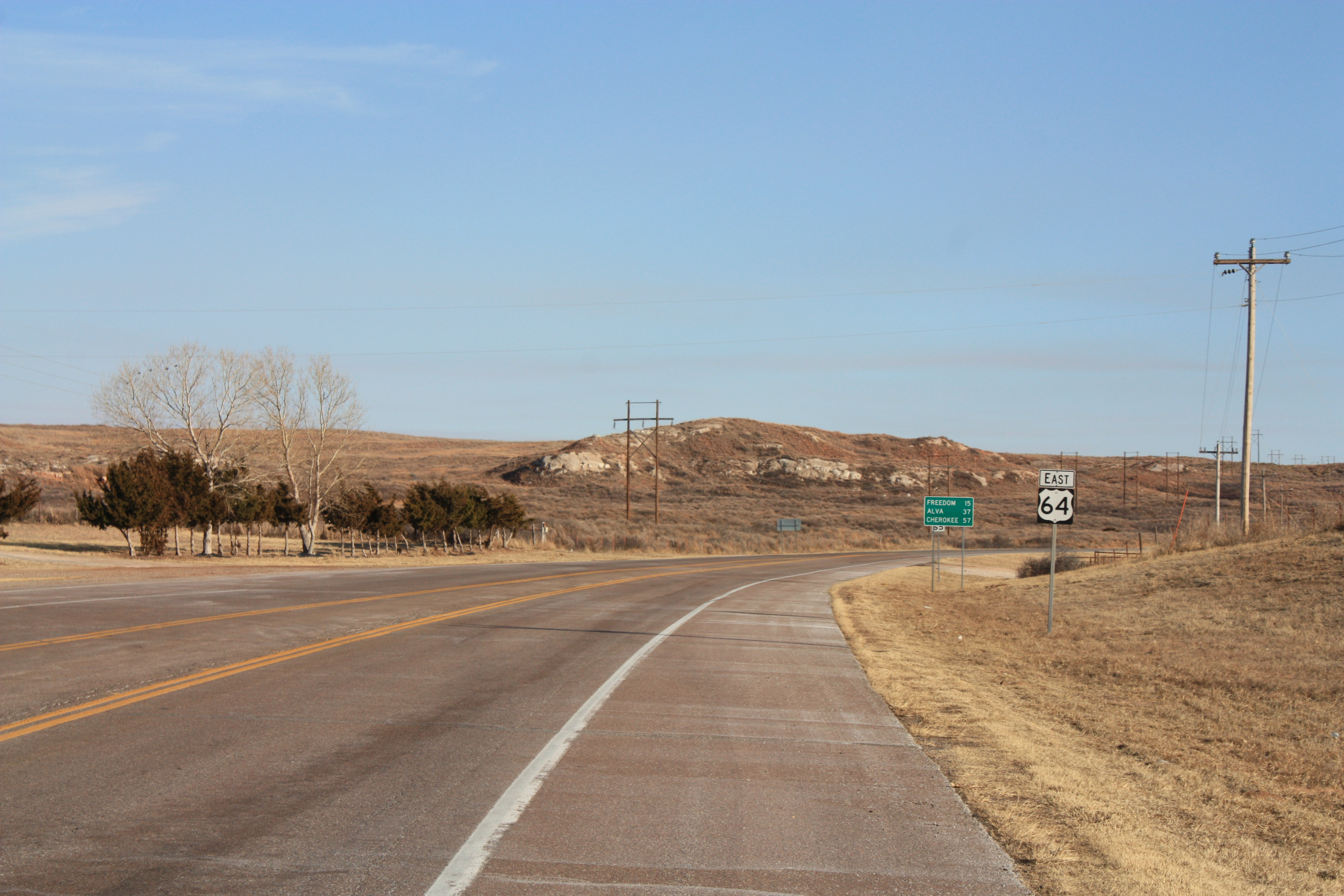
US 64 in Woods County

As US 64 and SH-34 cross the Cimarron River, the two highways enter Woods County. SH-34 splits off to the north shortly thereafter. US 64 continues on east, passing through unincorporated Plainview and turning southeast to intersect SH-50 at its northern terminus at Camp Houston, north of Freedom. The next highway junction is just over thirteen miles (21 km) east of Camp Houston, and is the northern terminus of SH-14 as signed; however, ODOT documents show SH-14 continuing east along US 64 from this point for slightly less than thirteen miles (21 km). The two highways proceed into the Woods County seat, Alva, where they join US 281. This concurrency lasts about one mile (1.6 km) before US 281 splits off to the north on the east side of town; at this point, SH-14 ends. US 64 continues east by itself for six miles (9.7 km) before reaching the eastern limit of Woods County.

The next county that US 64 serves on its path across Oklahoma is Alfalfa County. After passing eight miles (13 km) through rural Alfalfa county, it approaches the unincorporated Ingersoll, whereupon it continues another two miles (3.2 km) until the route intersects state highways 8, 11 and 58. All three of these highways extend north from the intersection, while SH-11 continues east. US 64 turns south at this intersection, overlapping SH-8 and SH-58. They then pass through Cherokee, seat of Alfalfa County. About five miles (8.0 km) south of town, SH-8 splits away to the southwest, while US 64 and SH-58 turn due east. Approximately six miles (9.7 km) east of that intersection, SH-58 also splits away, headed south toward Helena. US 64 proceeds east to Jet, where it forms the southern terminus of SH-38. Four miles west of Jet, the highway exits Alfalfa County.

Upon leaving Alfalfa County, US 64 passes into Grant County. The first town the highway passes through in Grant County is Nash, where it begins a concurrency with SH-132. This concurrency lasts for two miles (3.2 km) before SH-132 splits away. Eight miles (13 km) east of this junction, US 64 intersects US 60 and US 81 in a T junction. US 81 northbound and US 60 eastbound continue straight, while US 64 eastbound turns south along with southbound US 81 and westbound US 60 (creating a wrong-way concurrency with US 60). The three highways continue south into Garfield County. Fourteen miles (23 km) south of the T junction, US 60 / US 64 / US 81 serve as the eastern terminus of SH-45. This junction marks the highways' entry into the Enid area. The highways serve as the city limit boundary between Enid (to the west) and North Enid (to the east). About 1 1/2 miles (2.4 km) south of the SH-45 junction, US 64 splits away from the other two highways at an interchange where US 64 continues south and US 60 / US 81 take a southwesterly tack. US 64 heads south from the interchange on North 4th Street. At Willow Road, US 64 turns due east; it follows Willow Road for about two miles (3.2 km) before turning south on North 30th Street. This street has a parclo interchange with Owen K. Garriott Road, which carries US 412; here, US 64 joins US 412 and the two highways head due east out of Enid as a four-lane expressway. East of Enid, the two routes pass between Breckenridge and Fairmont. South of Garber lies an interchange between US 64 / US 412 and SH-74. SH-15 also begins here, extending north along SH-74. US 64 / US 412 continue east out of Garfield County.

US 64 and US 412 next enter Noble County. The two highways' first junction with another highway in the county is a cloverleaf interchange at I-35 (exit 194 on the interstate). US 412 continues straight through the interchange, forming the Cimarron Turnpike, while US 64 follows I-35 southbound. US 64 splits away from the interstate in Perry at exit 186, heading due east, deeper into Perry. In downtown Perry, about 2 1/3 miles (3.8 km) east of I-35, US 64 has a brief concurrency with US 77. US 64 continues east out of Perry. West of Morrison, the highway crosses US 177. US 64 then passes through Morrison. East of town, US 64 has an interchange with the Cimarron Turnpike, still carrying US 412, at turnpike exit 22. US 64 continues northeast to Lela, where it serves as the northern terminus of SH-108, which runs along the Noble–Pawnee county line. US 64 continues east into Pawnee County.

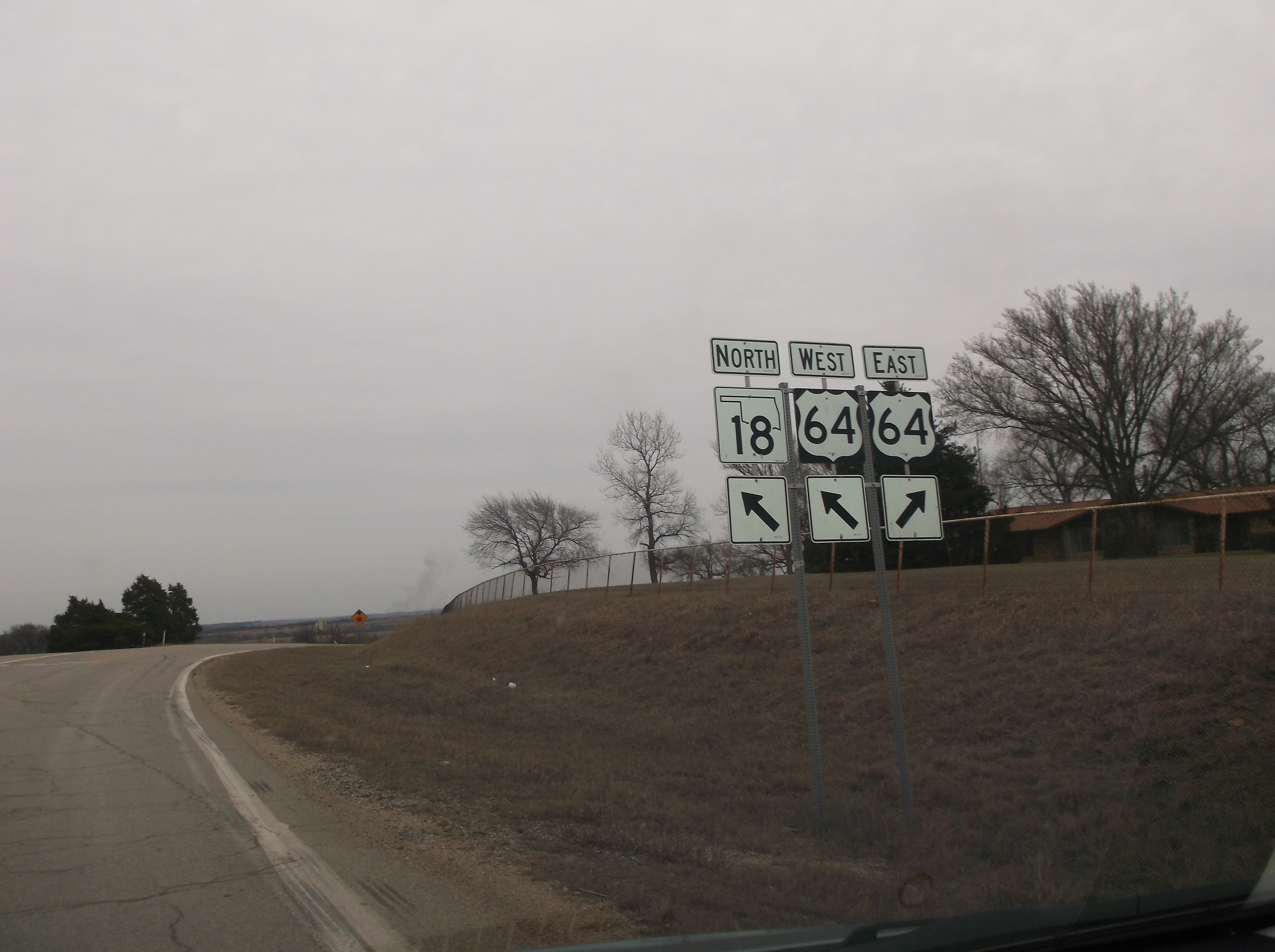
U.S. Route 64 and State Highway 18 in Oklahoma

About seven miles (11 km) into Pawnee County, US 64 enters the county seat, Pawnee. Here, the route begins a concurrency with SH-18. The two highways head southeast out of town together for just over two miles (3.2 km) before SH-18 splits off to the south toward Lone Chimney. US 64 continues alone to the east for about 12 3/4 miles (20.5 km) before beginning another concurrency, this time with SH-99 on the outskirts of Cleveland. The two highways leave Cleveland, proceeding east through unincorporated territory, before re-entering the city. Here, the two highways head in separate directions, with SH-99 heading north and US 64 heading southeast. This portion of the highway runs parallel to Keystone Lake, a reservoir formed by the impounded Arkansas River. US 64 intersects with SH-48 at the latter's northern terminus before merging with US 412 in a partial interchange (the missing movements are provided via SH-48). This interchange is also the Cimarron Turnpike's eastern endpoint.

=== Tulsa area ===
US 64 / US 412 continue east from the eastern terminus of the Cimarron Turnpike in southeastern Pawnee as a freeway known as the Keystone Expressway. This highway continues eastward along a peninsula into Lake Keystone. Here, the highway serves as the southern limit of Westport and Mule Barn, which remains an incorporated town despite having a population of zero. The freeway turns southeast, briefly entering Westport before crossing Lake Keystone into Osage County. US 64 and US 412 run through Osage County for just under 1 1/2 miles (2.4 km), cutting across a corner of the county before entering Tulsa County.

Upon entering Tulsa County, US 64 / US 412 serve as the northern terminus of SH-151. The freeway passes through an outlying parcel of Sand Springs, running parallel to the Arkansas River, before emerging into unincorporated territory. Proceeding east, the freeways re-enter Sand Springs, passing through an interchange with SH-97 just south of downtown. SH-51 joins the Keystone Expressway at this interchange. The freeway then enters Tulsa (estimated population 394,098 as of 2012), the second-largest city in Oklahoma. The Keystone Expressway continues to an interchange at the northwest corner of the Inner Dispersal Loop (IDL), a ring of freeways encircling downtown Tulsa. At this interchange, US 64 meets I-244 and the L.L. Tisdale Parkway. US 412 follows I-244 east, while US 64 and SH-51 turn south along I-244 westbound. The three highways then run along the western side of the IDL. At the southwest corner of the loop lies an interchange serving as the western terminus of unsigned I-444. US 64 and SH-51 split away from I-244 at this interchange to join I-444 and US 75. I-444, US 64, US 75 and SH-51 head east along the south leg of the IDL. At the southeast corner of the IDL, the highways part ways; I-444 and US 75 turn north along the east side of the IDL, while US 64 and SH-51 split off to the east.

US 64 and SH-51 proceed southeast from downtown along another freeway, the Broken Arrow Expressway. Between Lewis Avenue and Sheridan Road, a rail line runs down the median of the highway. After the freeway splits away from the railroad alignment, it comes to an interchange with I-44 / SH-66. From here, the Broken Arrow Expressway heads southeast to an interchange with the Mingo Valley Expressway, which carries US 169. Here, US-64 splits away to follow the southbound Mingo Valley Expressway, while SH-51 continues southeast on the Broken Arrow Expressway. US 64 / US 169 follow a due south course to an interchange with the Creek Turnpike. The freeway merges with a free section of the turnpike, heading west. At an interchange with Memorial Drive, US 64 turns south, splitting away from the freeway. US 169 ends at this point and tolls resume on the Creek Turnpike to the west of the interchange.

From here, US 64 proceeds south on Memorial Drive into Bixby. In Bixby, the highway crosses the Arkansas River for the second time. Further south, it serves as the eastern terminus of SH-67. On the southern outskirts of Bixby, it turns east, passing through unincorporated Leonard before exiting Tulsa County.

=== Eastern Oklahoma ===
Southeast of Leonard, US 64 cuts across extreme southwestern Wagoner County, passing through Stone Bluff, before entering Muskogee County. Approximately 2 1/2 miles (4.0 km) south of the county line, the highway serves the town of Haskell, where it begins a concurrency with SH-72 and junctions with SH-104 at its western terminus. US 64 and SH-72 head south from Haskell, passing through unincorporated Jamesville and coming to a junction south of the settlement. Here, SH-72 splits away from US 64, continuing a southbound course straight through the junction to join westbound US 62. The western leg of this junction leads to westbound SH-16. US 64 turns to the east, joined by eastbound US 62 and SH-16. The three routes serve as the southern terminus of SH-162, a spur route to Taft. The road forms a gentle S-curve as it comes into the city of Muskogee, the county seat. Here, the routes split ways at an intersection with US 69; US 62 ad SH-16 turn north along US 69 while US 64 follows southbound US 69. US 62 BUS / US 64 BUS continue east from the intersection. US 64 / US 69 continue south to an intersection with Peak Boulevard where US 64 heads east on its own. US 62 follows Peak Boulevard for about 1 1/4 miles (2.0 km), exiting at an interchange with US 64 Business; mainline US 64 continues south past the terminus of US 64 Business, while SH-165 continues east on Peak Boulevard. US 64 proceeds south for just under sixteen miles (26 km) to Warner where it forms the eastern terminus of US 266 and the northern terminus of SH-2. US 64 turns back to the east here, running parallel to I-40 between Warner and Webbers Falls where it has an interchange with the Muskogee Turnpike. East of the turnpike interchange, US 64 begins a concurrency with SH-100. The two highways pass northwest of downtown Webbers Falls before crossing the Arkansas River which forms the boundary of Muskogee County, a third time.

The final county US 64 passes through on its trek through Oklahoma is Sequoyah County where much of its path loosely follows that of I-40. SH-100 splits away from US 64 at an intersection about 3/4 mile (1.2 km) east of the Muskogee–Sequoyah county line, in Gore. At this same intersection, US 64 is joined by SH-10 which follows it out of Gore before splitting off southeast of town. US 64 continues alone to the town of Vian where it intersects SH-82. East of Vian, US 64 serves the county seat, Sallisaw where it overlaps US 59. On the southeast side of the city, it comes to an interchange with I-40 (exit 311 from the Interstate). US 64 heast southeast from Sallisaw, turning back to the east at the eastern terminus of SH-141. It crosses under I-40 just east of here, although there are no ramps between the two roads. US 64 then enters Muldrow. Here, the highway intersects SH-64B. US 64 then continues into Roland where another interchange with I-40 (exit 325) is located. The highway then turns southeast, passing north of Moffett with two interchanges serving SH-64D which heads north to Dora, Arkansas and Grand Boulevard which heads south into Moffett. US 64 then crosses the Arkansas River a fourth time, the final crossing in Oklahoma; the river's east bank is the Oklahoma–Arkansas state line.

== History ==
US 64 was one of the original United States Numbered Highways designated at the highway system's creation on November 11, 1926. It stretched from the New Mexico state line in the Oklahoma panhandle east to the Arkansas state line near Fort Smith. The original route included two sharp, right-angle turns near the city of Freedom. On February 19, 1934, the Oklahoma Highway Commission approved the re-routing of US 64 onto a roadway a bit further west to eliminate these turns. On November 9, 1937, the highway was re-routed through the city of Tulsa, as well. Later, in 1943 just south of the city of Muskogee, US 64 and SH-2, which was then concurrent with US 64, were relocated slightly to the west to allow for the new Davis Field air base to be constructed at the place the highways had run before relocation.

On July 7, 1947, another modification to the route was made, moving its western terminus from the northern portion of the panhandle to a new roadway in the southern section. The next significant change to the highway took place on April 4, 1960, when it was realigned to the north between the cities of Gore and Vian. Two years later, on April 4, 1962, US 64 was relocated to the north west of Tulsa, near Sand Springs. On November 4, 1963, a bypass was added through the city of Enid. It was designated as US 64 Bypass and ran on Willow Avenue and 30th Street. A couple of months later, on February 3, 1964, US 64 was moved onto a freeway through the southeastern portion of Tulsa. Later, on December 1 of the same year, similar reroutings through Tulsa and Broken Arrow were approved by the Oklahoma Department of Highways.

The routing of US 64 was modified further on July 6, 1965, through the city of Enid. The routing of US 64 Bypass, which was designated two years earlier, was replaced by that of US 64 itself, and what used to be US 64 became part of a new business loop (US 64 Bus.) through the city. The Oklahoma Department of Highways approved a rerouting of the designation onto a freeway south of Muskogee on October 3, 1966, and a relocation slightly to the north between Jamesville and Muskogee on July 10, 1967. However, neither of these modifications was completed until around 1969. Then, on June 1, 1970, US 64 was relocated across the Arkansas River between Webber Falls and Gore. Between then and 1972, US 64 was realigned between Enid and Perry, with the old highway becoming SH-164.

By 1974, the majority of the freeway that US 64 was to occupy in Tulsa was complete and it was relocated onto the completed portion of the freeway. Only the portion in the downtown section of the city was yet to be completed. The remainder of the freeway, the concurrency with Interstate 444, was not completed until about 1983. The next and final major modification to the designation of US 64 took place when it was moved from its route through eastern Tulsa onto the newly constructed Creek Turnpike over the first half of 1992. The route has undergone only minor changes since then.

The section of US 64 between Webbers Falls and Gore was pressed into service as a detour for I-40 traffic after the collapse of its bridge over the Arkansas River on May 26, 2002. The detour significantly impacted the town of Gore. Local firefighters directed traffic there 24 hours a day, with daytime temperatures approaching 100 °F (38 °C). Businesses in Gore reported loss of revenue due to the traffic; one gas station reported a 30% decline in revenue while traffic was detoured through town. Delays of thirty to fifty minutes on the 12-mile (19 km) detour were typical, although trains passing through Gore could lengthen wait times by 15 minutes.

== Major intersections ==
County	Location	mi	km	Exit	Destinations	Notes
Cimarron		0.00	0.00		US 56 west / US 64 west / US 412 west – Clayton	Continuation into New Mexico
Cimarron		28.4	45.7		US 385 south – Dalhart	Western end of US 385 concurrency
Cimarron	Boise City	31.7	51.0		US 385 north / SH-3 west (Cimarron Avenue north) / SH-325 west (Main Street west) – Kenton, Denver	Roundabout around Cimarron County courthouse; eastern end of US 385 concurrency; western end of SH-3 concurrency; eastern terminus of SH-325
Cimarron		33.3	53.6		US 287 – Amarillo, Denver, Stratford	Interchange
Cimarron		39.4	63.4		US 56 east – Elkhart	Eastern end of US 56 concurrency; former SH-114
Cimarron		47.1	75.8		SH-171 – Keyes, Stratford	
Texas		66.0	106.2		SH-95 north – Yarbrough, Elkhart	Western end of SH-95 concurrency
Texas		71.0	114.3		SH-95 south – Texhoma	Eastern end of SH-95 concurrency
Texas		89.1	143.4		SH-136 north – Hugoton	Western end of SH-136 concurrency
Texas	Guymon	93.4	150.3		US 412 east / SH-3 east (Main Street south) / US 412 Truck / SH-3 Truck / SH-136 Truck begin	Eastern end of US 412 concurrency; western end of Truck Routes concurrency
Texas	Guymon	94.2	151.6		US 54 west / US 412 Truck / SH-3 Truck / SH-136 Truck – Goodwell	Eastern end of truck routes concurrency; western end of US 54 concurrency
Texas	Hooker	112.6	181.2		SH-94	Northern terminus of SH-94
Texas	Hooker	113.1	182.0		US 54 east – Liberal	Eastern end of US 54 concurrency
Beaver	Turpin	131.3	211.3		US 83 south	Western end of US 83 concurrency
Beaver		134.3	216.1		US 83 north / US 270 west	Eastern end of US 83 concurrency; western end of US 270 concurrency
Beaver		154.2	248.2		US 270 east / SH-23 south	Eastern end of US 270 concurrency, western end of SH-23 concurrency
Beaver		155.2	249.8		SH-23 north	Eastern end of SH-23 concurrency
Harper		186.4	300.0		US 283 north	Western end of US 283 concurrency
Harper		190.8	307.1		US 283 south	Eastern end of US 283 concurrency
Harper		198.8	319.9		SH-46	
Harper	Buffalo	205.6	330.9		US 183 south	Western end of US 183 concurrency
Harper		207.5	333.9		US 183 north	Eastern end of US 183 concurrency
Harper		221.6	356.6		SH-34 south	Western end of SH-34 concurrency
Woods		225.1	362.3		SH-34 north	Eastern end of SH-34 concurrency
Woods		236.9	381.3		SH-50	Northern terminus of SH-50
Woods		250.2	402.7		SH-14 south	Northern terminus of SH-14
Woods	Alva	262.1	421.8		US 281 south (College Boulevard)	Western end of US 281 concurrency
Woods	Alva	263.1	423.4		US 281 north (Lane Boulevard)	Eastern end of US 281 concurrency
Alfalfa		279.0	449.0		SH-8 / SH-58 north / SH-11 – Burlington, Medford	Western end of SH-8/SH-58 concurrency
Alfalfa		288.2	463.8		SH-8 south	Eastern end of SH-8 concurrency
Alfalfa		294.1	473.3		SH-58 south	Eastern end of SH concurrency
Alfalfa	Jet	298.1	479.7		SH-38	Southern terminus of SH-38
Grant	Nash	306.0	492.5		SH-132 north	Western end of SH-132 concurrency
Grant		308.0	495.7		SH-132 south	Eastern end of SH-132 concurrency
Grant		316.0	508.6		US 60 east / US 81 north	Northern end of US 60/US 81 concurrency
Garfield	Enid	330.0	531.1		SH-45	Eastern terminus of SH-45
Garfield	Enid	331.2	533.0		US 60 west / US 81 south (Van Buren Bypass) / US 64 east (4th Street)	Interchange; westbound access to US 60 west/US 81 south via U-turn north of exit; Southern end of US 60/US 81 concurrency
Garfield	Enid	336.9	542.2		US 412 west / US 64 Bus. west (Owen K. Garriot Road)	Interchange; western end of US 412 concurrency
Garfield		351.2	565.2		SH-15 east / SH-74 – Covington, Garber	Interchange; western terminus of SH-15
Noble		365.3	587.9		I-35 north / Future I-42 east / US 412 Toll east / Cimarron Turnpike east – Wichita, Tulsa	Cloverleaf interchange; eastern end of US 412 concurrency; western end of I-35 concurrency; future western terminus of I-42; I-35 exit 194B
Noble		366.1	589.2	193	Airport Road	Northbound exit and southbound entrance; exit number follows I-35
Noble	Perry	373.0	600.3		I-35 south / Fir Street west – Guthrie, Oklahoma City	Eastern end of I-35 concurrency; I-35 exit 186
Noble	Perry	375.4	604.1		US 77 south (7th Street)	Western end of US 77 concurrency
Noble	Perry	375.5	604.3		US 77 north (6th Street)	Eastern end of US 77 concurrency
Noble		387.6	623.8		US 177	
Noble		392.2	631.2		Future I-42 / US 412 Toll / Cimarron Turnpike – Tulsa, Enid	Cimarron Turnpike exit 22
Noble–Pawnee county line	Lela	396.0	637.3		SH-108	Northern terminus of SH-108
Pawnee	Pawnee	403.4	649.2		SH-18 north (4th Street north)	Western end of SH-18 concurrency
Pawnee		405.6	652.7		SH-18 south – Cushing	Eastern end of SH-18 concurrency
Pawnee		418.0	672.7		SH-99 south	Western end of SH-99 concurrency
Pawnee	Cleveland	424.3	682.8		SH-99 north (Broadway Street north)	Eastern end of SH-99 concurrency
Pawnee		431.8	694.9		SH-48 south to US 412 west / Cimarron Turnpike west – Mannford, Bristow, Enid	Northern terminus of SH-48
Pawnee		432.5	696.0	—	Future I-42 west / US 412 Toll west / Cimarron Turnpike west – Stillwater, Enid	Westbound left exit and eastbound left entrance; western end of freeway section; western end of US 412 concurrency
Pawnee		434.2	698.8	—	Westport Road	Serves Westport Airport
Pawnee		437.7	704.4	—	Old Keystone Road	
Pawnee		439.6	707.5	—	Bears Glen	
Osage	No major junctions					
Tulsa		442.0	711.3	—	SH-151 west – Keystone State Park	Northern terminus of SH-151
Tulsa	Sand Springs	443.3	713.4	—	209th West Avenue	
Tulsa	Sand Springs	445.3	716.6	—	177th West Avenue	
Tulsa	Sand Springs	448.6	722.0	—	Willow Street	
Tulsa	Sand Springs	449.8	723.9	—	SH-51 west / SH-97 junction – Sapulpa, Mannford	Western end of SH-51 concurrency
Tulsa	Sand Springs				2nd Street	Eastbound entrance only
Tulsa	Sand Springs	450.6	725.2	—	Adams Road	Westbound exit only
Tulsa	Sand Springs	451.7	726.9	—	81st West Avenue	
Tulsa		452.9	728.9	—	65th West Avenue	
Tulsa	Tulsa	454.0	730.6	—	49th West Avenue	
Tulsa	Tulsa	455.1	732.4	—	33rd West Avenue	Westbound exit and eastbound entrance
Tulsa	Tulsa	455.5	733.1	—	25th West Avenue	
Tulsa	Tulsa	455.9	733.7	—	Quanah Avenue	Eastbound exit and westbound entrance
Tulsa	Tulsa	456.5	734.7	—	Future I-42 east / I-244 east / US 412 east / L.L. Tisdale Parkway north to US 75 north – Bartlesville, Joplin	Eastern end of US 412 concurrency; western end of I-244 concurrency; I-244 exit 5B
Tulsa	Tulsa	456.8	735.1	5A	2nd Street – Downtown	Eastbound exit and westbound entrance
Tulsa	Tulsa	457.2	735.8	—	I-244 west / US 75 south (Red Fork Expressway south) – Okmulgee, Oklahoma City; I-444 begins	Eastern end of I-244 concurrency; western end of US 75/unsigned I-444 concurrency; I-244 exit 4B
Tulsa	Tulsa	See I-444				
Tulsa	Tulsa	458.8	738.4	—	US 75 north / I-444 east – Bartlesville	Eastern end of US 75/unsigned I-444 concurrency; eastbound left exit and westbound entrance
Tulsa	Tulsa	458.8	738.4	—	Detroit Avenue – Downtown, T.C.C.-Metro	Westbound exit and eastbound entrance
Tulsa	Tulsa	458.8	738.4	—	US 75 north / I-444 east – Bartlesville	Westbound exit and eastbound left entrance; entrance includes direct entrance ramp from 8th Street
Tulsa	Tulsa	459.5	739.5	—	Utica Avenue	Eastbound exit and westbound entrance
Tulsa	Tulsa	460.0	740.3	—	Lewis Avenue	No westbound exit
Tulsa	Tulsa			—	Peoria Avenue / Utica Avenue	Westbound exit and eastbound entrance
Tulsa	Tulsa	460.3	740.8	—	15th Street	No eastbound entrance
Tulsa	Tulsa	460.8	741.6	—	21st Street	
Tulsa	Tulsa	461.5	742.7	—	Harvard Avenue	
Tulsa	Tulsa	462.6	744.5	—	31st Street / Yale Avenue – Fairgrounds, Expo Square	
Tulsa	Tulsa	463.7	746.3	—	Sheridan Road	
Tulsa	Tulsa	464.2	747.1	—	I-44 / SH-66 – Oklahoma City, Joplin	Cloverleaf interchange; I-44 exit 231
Tulsa	Tulsa	464.9	748.2	—	Memorial Drive	Eastbound exit includes direct exit ramp onto 38th Street
Tulsa	Tulsa	465.5	749.1	—	Mingo Road	No westbound exit
Tulsa	Tulsa	466.4	750.6	—	US 169 north (Mingo Valley Expressway north) / SH-51 east (Broken Arrow Expressway east) – Owasso, Broken Arrow, Muskogee via SH-351 (Turnpike)	Eastern end of SH-51 concurrency; western end of US 169 concurrency
Tulsa	Tulsa	467.1	751.7	—	51st Street South	
Tulsa	Tulsa	468.1	753.3	—	61st Street South	
Tulsa	Tulsa	469.1	754.9	—	71st Street South	
Tulsa	Tulsa	469.9	756.2	—	81st Street South	
Tulsa	Tulsa	470.6	757.4	—	Creek Turnpike east – Broken Arrow	Eastbound exit and westbound entrance
Tulsa	Tulsa	471.1	758.2	—	91st Street South	No westbound exit
Tulsa	Tulsa	471.7	759.1	—	Creek Turnpike east – Broken Arrow, Joplin US 169 ends	Southern terminus of US 169; eastern end of US 169 concurrency; northern end of Creek Turnpike concurrency
Tulsa	Tulsa	471.8	759.3	—	Mingo Road	Westbound exit only
Tulsa	Tulsa	472.3	760.1		Creek Turnpike west	Southern end of Creek Turnpike concurrency; eastern end of freeway section
Tulsa	Bixby	478.3	769.7		SH-67 west	Eastern terminus of SH-67
Wagoner	No major junctions					
Muskogee	Haskell	495.3	797.1		SH-72 north	Western end of SH-72 concurrency
Muskogee	Haskell	495.6	797.6		SH-104	Western terminus of SH-104
Muskogee		501.6	807.2		US 62 east / SH-72 south / SH-16 east	Eastern end of SH-72 concurrency; western end of US 62/SH-16 concurrency
Muskogee		506.6	815.3		SH-162	Southern terminus of SH-162
Muskogee	Muskogee	515.4	829.5		US 62 / SH-16 east / US 69 north (32nd Street north) / US 62 Bus. east (US 64 Bus. east) – Central Business District	Eastern end of US 62/SH-16 concurrency, western end of US 69 concurrency, western terminus of US 62 Bus. and US 69 Bus.
Muskogee	Muskogee	518.4	834.3		US 69 south	Interchange; eastern end of US 69 concurrency
Muskogee	Muskogee	519.8	836.5		SH-165 east (Peak Boulevard east) / US 64 Bus. west	Interchange; western terminus of SH-165; eastern terminus of US 64 Bus.
Muskogee	Muskogee				To SH-165	Interchange; westbound exit only
Muskogee	Warner	535.9	862.4		US 266 west / SH-2 south to I-40	Eastern terminus of US 266; northern terminus of SH-2
Muskogee	Webbers Falls	543.9	875.3		Muskogee Turnpike	Access to westbound and from eastbound Muskogee Turnpike only; SH-351 exit 55
Muskogee	Webbers Falls	545.6	878.1		SH-100 south	Western end of SH-100 concurrency
Sequoyah	Gore	547.9	881.8		SH-10 / SH-100 north (Main Street north)	Eastern end of SH-100 concurrency, western end of SH-10 concurrency
Sequoyah		550.5	885.9		SH-10 south	Eastern end of SH-10 concurrency
Sequoyah	Vian	556.8	896.1		SH-82	
Sequoyah	Sallisaw	567.1	912.7		US 59 south / I-40 BL west (Kerr Boulevard)	Western end of US 59/I-40 Bus. concurrency
Sequoyah	Sallisaw	568.2	914.4		US 59 north (Wheeler Street)	Eastern end of US 59 concurrency
Sequoyah	Sallisaw	570.1	917.5		I-40 – Oklahoma City, Ft. Smith I-40 BL ends	Eastern end of I-40 Bus. concurrency; I-40 exit 311
Sequoyah		576.2	927.3		SH-141	Northern terminus of SH-141
Sequoyah	Muldrow	580.4	934.1		SH-64B	Southern terminus of SH-64B
Sequoyah	Roland	584.5	940.7		I-40 – Oklahoma City, Little Rock	I-40 exit 325
Sequoyah		589.0	947.9		SH-64D	Trumpet interchange, southern terminus of SH-64D
Sequoyah		589.6	948.9		Moffett Stockyards	Parclo interchange
Arkansas River		590.1	949.7		J. Fred Patton Garrison Street Bridge; Oklahoma–Arkansas line	
Arkansas River		590.1	949.7		US 64 east – Fort Smith	Continuation into Arkansas
1.000 mi = 1.609 km; 1.000 km = 0.621 mi: Concurrency terminus; Electronic toll collection; Incomplete access

== Spur routes ==
Near the east end of its route through Oklahoma, US 64 currently connects to two short highways, bearing the number "64" with a letter suffix, branching off from the interstate to connect the highway to other roads. Both of these highways lie entirely within Sequoyah County and connect US 64 to I-40.

In the past, US 64 also connected to a short spur highway in Perry.

=== SH-64A ===
State Highway 64A
- Location: Perry
- Length: 2 mi (3.2 km)
- Existed: c. 1964–c. 1971

State Highway 64A began at I-35 exit 186 and extended east into Perry for approximately two miles (3.2 km). SH-64A first appeared on the official state highway map in 1965, though it was not labeled as SH-64A until the 1966 edition.

When US 64 was realigned around 1971, US 64 was realigned to follow SH-64A through Perry. The SH-64A designation was retired at this time.

=== SH-64B ===
State Highway 64B
- Location: Sequoyah County
- Length: 11.39 mi (18.33 km)
- Existed: c. 1958–present

State Highway 64B begins at I-40 exit 321 in Muldrow and heads north along Main Street, connecting with US 64 0.6 miles (0.97 km) north of the interstate. From here, the highway continues north along Main Street through downtown Muldrow. After passing through downtown, SH-64B leaves the city limits and proceeds north to unincorporated Long. North of Long, it comes to its northern terminus at SH-101. SH-64B's total length is 11.39 miles (18.33 km).

SH-64B first appeared on the 1959 state highway map as a gravel highway. By 1962, the southern half of the highway had been paved. The remainder of the highway was paved by the following year.

=== SH-64C ===
State Highway 64C
- Location: Sequoyah County
- Length: 9 mi (14 km)
- Existed: c. 1973–c. 1975

State Highway 64C was a short state highway in Sequoyah County that existed briefly in the early 1970s. SH-64C began at SH-64B north of Muldrow. From here, it proceeded southeast in a stairstep fashion, using a mix of gravel and paved roads, to Roland. From Roland, it continued south, crossing I-40 and coming to its eastern terminus at US 64. Its length was nine miles (14 km).

SH-64C first appeared on the 1974 state highway map. By the following year, the portion of highway between downtown Roland and US 64 had been removed from the state highway system, bringing its length down to eight miles (13 km). It had been removed from the state highway system in its entirety by 1976.

=== SH-64D ===
State Highway 64D
- Location: Sequoyah County
- Length: 3.65 mi (5.87 km)
- Existed: c. 1973–present

State Highway 64D is a highway beginning at US 64 in Moffett, running parallel to the Oklahoma–Arkansas state line to its northern terminus at I-40 exit 330 just west of Dora, Arkansas. SH-64D is 3.65 miles (5.87 km) long.

SH-64D first appeared on the 1974 state map. At that time, the highway had a gravel road surface. By the next year, it had been paved in its entirety.

U.S. Route 64
Previous state: New Mexico	Oklahoma	Next state: Arkansas
