= Oklahoma State Highway 165 =

State highway in Oklahoma, United States

State Highway 165

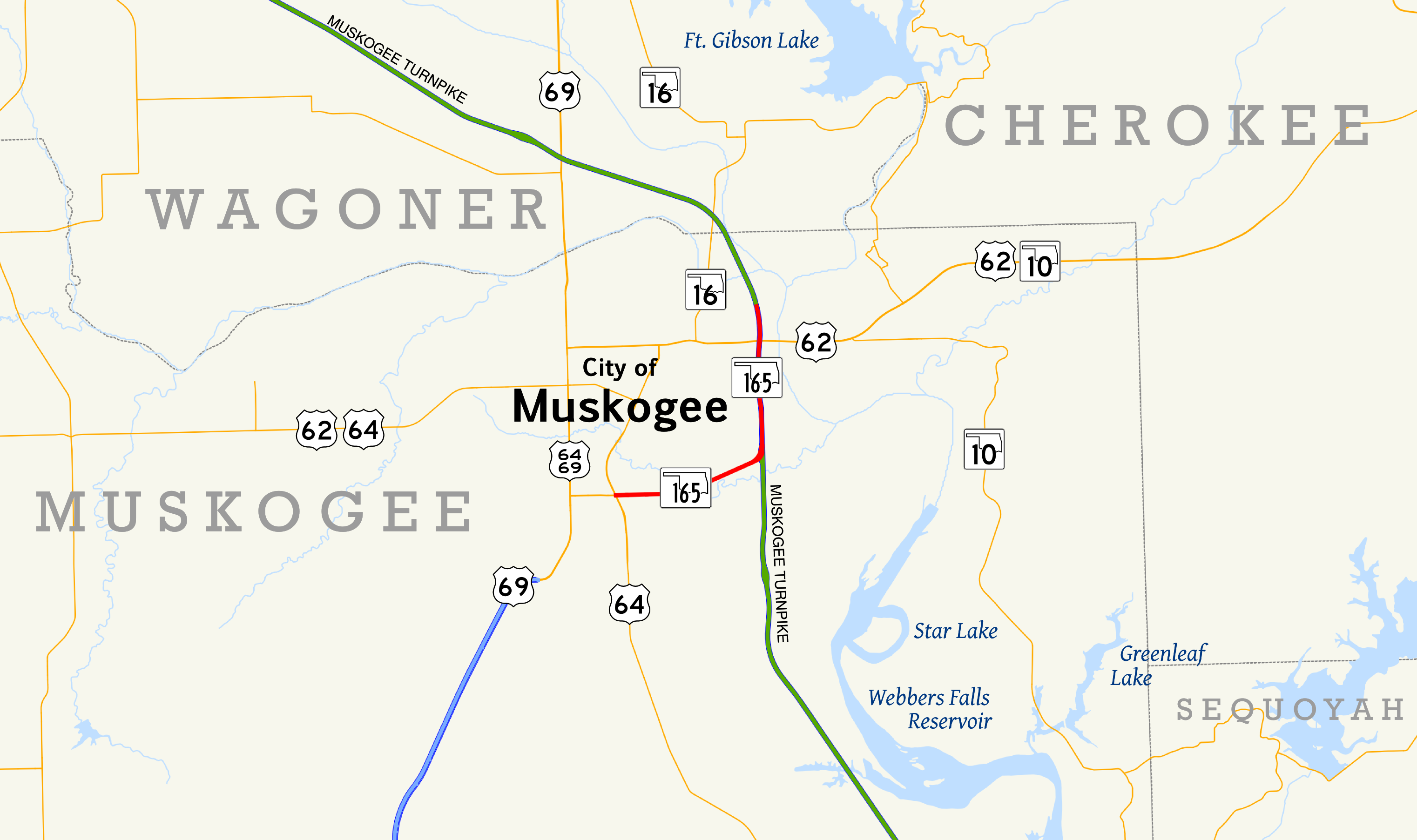

Route information
- Maintained by ODOT
- Length: 8.21 mi (13.21 km)
- Existed: ca. 1969–present

Major junctions
- West end: US 64 / US 64 Bus. in Muskogee
- US 62 in Muskogee
- North end: Muskogee Turnpike / SH-351 at the Hyde Park Road interchange in Muskogee

Location
- Country: United States
- State: Oklahoma

Highway system
- Oklahoma State Highway System; Interstate; US; State; Turnpikes
← SH-164	→ SH-166

State Highway 165 (SH-165) is a state highway in Muskogee County, Oklahoma. It runs east along Peak Boulevard in the southern part of Muskogee from US-64 to the northern terminus of the southern section of the Muskogee Turnpike, then runs north as a freeway connecting the two sections of the turnpike. The total length of the highway is 8.21 miles (13.21 km).

The freeway connecting the two halves of the Muskogee Turnpike was first numbered as SH-165 in 1969. The east–west portion of highway along Peak Boulevard was built and numbered as SH-165 by 1987.

== Route description ==
SH-165 begins at an interchange on Peak Boulevard on the south side of Muskogee. To the west of this interchange, Peak Boulevard carries US-64; that highway exits from Peak at the interchange and proceeds south towards Warner. This interchange is also the eastern terminus of US-64 Business, which continues to the north towards downtown Muskogee. From the interchange, SH-165 follows Peak Boulevard to the east as an expressway, crossing Coody Creek before turning to the east-northeast. As the highway crosses York Street, it exits the Muskogee city limits.

SH-165 then has a partial interchange with the Muskogee Turnpike; the turnpike is only accessible from southbound SH-165. The Muskogee Turnpike consists of two disconnected sections of toll road with an untolled freeway segment in between; northbound SH-165 traffic merges with the northbound lanes of the turnpike to form this freeway. Shortly after this interchange, the highway re-enters Muskogee. The SH-165 freeway serves the east side of Muskogee, with interchanges with city arterials such as Chandler Road, Hancock Street, and Gibson Street. The highway also includes a full cloverleaf interchange with US-62. SH-165 continues north of US-62 for 0.96 miles (1.54 km) to its final interchange with Hyde Park Road near the Port of Muskogee. At this interchange, SH-165 ends; northbound traffic defaults onto the northbound Muskogee Turnpike towards Tulsa.

== History ==
The freeway between the two sections of the Muskogee Turnpike that would later become SH-165 first appears on the official Oklahoma state map in 1969. The Muskogee inset of that map shows the freeway, unnumbered, and the southern SH-165–turnpike interchange in place, but with ramp stubs, as the SH-165 portion of Peak Boulevard had yet to be built. The following year's map shows SH-165 in place along the connector freeway. By 1975, the Peak Boulevard portion of SH-165 was under construction. The highway was complete and in its present-day configuration by 1987.

== Junction list ==
The entire route is in Muskogee, Muskogee County.

mi	km	Destinations	Notes
0.00	0.00	US 64 west – Tulsa	
0.00	0.00	US 64 east / US 64 Bus. – Ft. Smith	Interchange; southwestern terminus
4.44	7.15	Muskogee Turnpike east – Ft. Smith	Southwestern end of feeway; Muskogee Turnpike west exit 37
5.2	8.4	Chandler Road, Hancock Street	
6.2	10.0	Gibson Street	
7.1– 7.3	11.4– 11.7	US 62 east – Ft. Gibson, Tahlequah US 62 west – Muskogee, Bacone College, N.S.U. Muskogee	Cloverleaf interchange; US 62 exit 286
8.21	13.21	Hyde Park Road – Port of Muskogee, War Memorial Park	Northeastern terminus; Muskogee Turnpike east exit 33
8.21	13.21	Muskogee Turnpike west – Tulsa	
1.000 mi = 1.609 km; 1.000 km = 0.621 mi: Tolled
