= Muskogee Turnpike =

Toll road in Oklahoma, US

Muskogee Turnpike
- Muskogee Turnpike highlighted in red

Route information
- Maintained by Oklahoma Turnpike Authority
- Length: 53.1 mi (85.5 km)
- Existed: October 16, 1969–present
- Component highways: SH-351 entire length; SH-165 in Muskogee

Major junctions
- West end: SH-51 in Broken Arrow
- Creek Turnpike in Broken Arrow; US 69 in Muskogee; US 62 in Muskogee
- East end: I-40 near Webbers Falls

Location
- Country: United States
- State: Oklahoma

Highway system
- Oklahoma State Highway System; Interstate; US; State; Turnpikes

The Muskogee Turnpike, also designated State Highway 351 (SH-351), is a controlled-access toll road in eastern Oklahoma.

== Route description ==
Opened in 1969, the 53-mile (85.2 km) route begins at the Broken Arrow Expressway (SH-51) southeast of Tulsa, near an intersection with the Creek Turnpike. The Turnpike ends at Interstate 40 west of Webbers Falls. The Muskogee Turnpike's north section is connected to its south section by Oklahoma 165.

== History ==
The Muskogee Turnpike originally bore no numbered designation. On March 10, 2014, the Oklahoma Transportation Commission unanimously approved a motion to apply the SH-351 designation to the turnpike.

On May 5, 2025, the Oklahoma Transportation Commission unanimously approved a motion to apply the Interstate 343 designation to the turnpike, pending approval by the American Association of State Highway and Transportation Officials (AASHTO) and the Federal Highway Administration (FHWA). This numbering, if approved, would not fit the usual conventions of existing three-digit auxiliary Interstate Highways, where a single digit is prefixed to the two-digit number of its parent Interstate Highway since it would have no relation to I-43, which only runs in Wisconsin. As a result, it is unknown what the route's parent interstate would be.

== Tolls ==
As of August 2023, a two-axle vehicle pays $7.00 PlatePay ($3.30 with Pikepass) to drive the full length of the Turnpike. There are two toll collection plazas located along the length of the Muskogee Turnpike. The Muskogee Main Line Plaza is located approximately 5 miles (8.0 km) south of the city of Muskogee and has an inline Pikepass lane, an exact change lane, and an attended collection lane. Speed limits through this plaza are 30 miles per hour (48 km/h) for all vehicles. The Coweta Main Line Plaza is located approximately 15 miles (24 km) north of the city of Muskogee at the Coweta exit, and has four collection lanes: one exact change lane, two attended lanes, and a Pikepass lane that is independent from the plaza. The speed limit at this plaza is 30 miles per hour (48 km/h) for all vehicles, except Pikepass vehicles, which bypass the collection plaza. As of 2025, the cash lanes are no longer used. The Oklahoma Turnpikes are now cashless, utilizing either the Pikepass system, or the plate pay system, where OTA mails bills for the turnpike traveled on.

== Services ==
Located approximately 10 miles (16 km) north of the city of Muskogee is a newly renovated concession plaza which reopened in April 2011. This concession plaza has a Love's travel stop, as well as a McDonald's restaurant. The concession plaza has free restrooms, is open 24 hours a day, and is located in the median for easy access from both travel directions. Groundwork was laid out for a second concession plaza just north of the Muskogee Main Line collection plaza; however this plaza was never built, and all pavement and ramps have since been removed.

Law enforcement along the Muskogee Turnpike is provided by Oklahoma Highway Patrol Troop XB, a special troop assigned to the turnpike.

== Exit list ==
County	Location	mi	km	Exit	Destinations	Notes
Wagoner	Broken Arrow	0.0	0.0	–	SH-51 west (Broken Arrow Expressway)	Western terminus
Wagoner	Broken Arrow	0.0	0.0	–	SH-51	Eastbound entrance only
Wagoner	Broken Arrow			–	Creek Turnpike east	SH-364 not signed westbound; no toll from EB Muskogee Tpk. to WB Creek Tpk.
Wagoner	Coweta			13	SH-51 – Wagoner, Coweta	
Wagoner	Coweta			Coweta Main Line Gantry		
Wagoner				19	To SH-51B – Porter	Eastbound exit and westbound entrance; future full interchange
Wagoner				Turnpike Concession		
Wagoner				26	US 69 – Muskogee, Wagoner	Westbound toll
Muskogee	Muskogee			33	Hyde Park Road – Port of Muskogee, War Memorial Park	Exit number not signed westbound
Muskogee	Muskogee			SH-165 begins Free section begins		
Muskogee	Muskogee	34	55	–	US 62 – Muskogee, Bacone College, NSU Muskogee, Fort Gibson, Tahlequah	
Muskogee	Muskogee	35	56	–	Gibson Street	
Muskogee	Muskogee	36	58	–	Chandler Road / Hancock Street	Hancock Street not signed westbound
Muskogee	Muskogee	37	60	–	SH-165 west (Peak Boulevard) to US 64	Eastbound exit and westbound entrance; eastern end of SH-165 concurrency
Muskogee	Muskogee	37	60	Free section ends		
Muskogee		37	60	37	To SH-165 west (Hancock Street)	Westbound exit only
Muskogee				Concession plaza		
Muskogee		42	68	Muskogee Main Line Gantry		
Muskogee	Webbers Falls	55.56	89.42	55	US 64 – Webbers Falls, Warner	Eastbound exit and westbound entrance
Muskogee	Webbers Falls			56	I-40 – Oklahoma City, Fort Smith	Eastern terminus; signed as exits 56A (west) and 56B (east); exit 286 on I-40
1.000 mi = 1.609 km; 1.000 km = 0.621 mi: Concurrency terminus; Electronic toll collection; Closed/former; Incomplete access

== See also ==
- Oklahoma Turnpike Authority
- Pikepass
