= Hayward, Oklahoma =

- Unincorporated community
- Location within Oklahoma Location within the United States
- Coordinates: 36°16′40″N 97°30′45″W
- Country: United States
- State: Oklahoma
- County: Garfield
- Elevation: 1,198 ft (365 m)
- Time zone: UTC-6 (Central (CST))
  - Summer (DST): UTC-5 (CDT)
- ZIP codes: 73757
- Area code: 580
- FIPS code: 33200
- GNIS feature ID: 1093623

Hayward is an unincorporated community located on Oklahoma State Highway 164 in Garfield County, Oklahoma, United States. It is located on the Black Bear-Red Rock Watershed.
