= Moffett, Oklahoma =

- Town
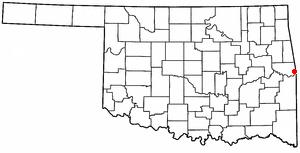
- Location of Moffett, Oklahoma
- Coordinates: 35°23′26″N 94°30′25″W
- Country: United States
- State: Oklahoma
- County: Sequoyah

Area
  - Total: 1.00 sq mi (2.58 km^{2})
  - Land: 0.98 sq mi (2.54 km^{2})
  - Water: 0.015 sq mi (0.04 km^{2})
- Elevation: 417 ft (127 m)

Population (2020)
  - Total: 38
  - Density: 38.8/sq mi (14.97/km^{2})
- Time zone: UTC-6 (Central (CST))
  - Summer (DST): UTC-5 (CDT)
- ZIP code: 74946
- Area codes: 539/918
- FIPS code: 40-49000
- GNIS feature ID: 2413007

Moffett is a town in Sequoyah County, Oklahoma, United States. It is part of the Fort Smith, Arkansas-Oklahoma Metropolitan Statistical Area. As of the 2020 census, Moffett had a population of 38.

== History ==
After the Civil War, several Cherokee and Cherokee freedmen settled around the present community of Moffett. A post office was established in 1908 and was named for Martha Moffett Payne, wife of Dr. Samuel Payne. The town became an agricultural center, especially for cotton farmers.

Moffett incorporated in 1928. Its population was 340 at the 1930 census, and peaked at 538 in 1940. Before and during World War II, the town's bars and gambling establishments attracted soldiers from nearby Fort Smith, Arkansas and Camp Chaffee. The U.S. Army declared Moffett "off limits" during the war, and kept the ban in place until the mid-1970s. The town began a long decline after World War II. The 1960 census counted 357 residents, and the decline has continued to the present.

Moffett's history has included several damaging floods. The most notable of these occurred in 1943, 1957, 1986, 1990, and 2019.

In 2007, the town filed for Chapter 9 bankruptcy after Oklahoma's attorney general declared it was operating a speed trap, and barred local police from issuing speeding citations. Without the steady stream of citation revenue generated from motorists passing through on U.S. Highway 64, the town was unable to manage the $200,000 in debts incurred by the former mayor.

== Geography ==
Moffett is located in the Arkansas River floodplain, across the river from Fort Smith.

According to the United States Census Bureau, the town has a total area of 0.1 square miles (0.26 km^{2}), all land.

== Demographics ==
Historical population
Census	Pop.	Note	%±
1930	340		—
1940	538		58.2%
1950	380		−29.4%
1960	357		−6.1%
1970	312		−12.6%
1980	269		−13.8%
1990	219		−18.6%
2000	179		−18.3%
2010	128		−28.5%
2020	38		−70.3%
U.S. Decennial Census

=== 2020 census ===
As of the 2020 census, Moffett had a population of 38. The median age was 41.5 years. 18.4% of residents were under the age of 18 and 23.7% of residents were 65 years of age or older. For every 100 females there were 111.1 males, and for every 100 females age 18 and over there were 106.7 males age 18 and over.

0.0% of residents lived in urban areas, while 100.0% lived in rural areas.

There were 11 households in Moffett, of which 9.1% had children under the age of 18 living in them. Of all households, 27.3% were married-couple households, 27.3% were households with a male householder and no spouse or partner present, and 36.4% were households with a female householder and no spouse or partner present. About 36.4% of all households were made up of individuals and 0.0% had someone living alone who was 65 years of age or older.

There were 18 housing units, of which 38.9% were vacant. The homeowner vacancy rate was 10.0% and the rental vacancy rate was 33.3%.

Racial composition as of the 2020 census
Race	Number	Percent
White	27	71.1%
Black or African American	7	18.4%
American Indian and Alaska Native	1	2.6%
Asian	1	2.6%
Native Hawaiian and Other Pacific Islander	0	0.0%
Some other race	0	0.0%
Two or more races	2	5.3%
Hispanic or Latino (of any race)	1	2.6%

=== 2000 census ===
As of the census of 2000, there were 179 people, 61 households, and 40 families residing in the town. The population density was 1,373.2 inhabitants per square mile (530.2/km^{2}). There were 68 housing units at an average density of 521.7 per square mile (201.4/km^{2}). The racial makeup of the town was 58.10% White, 8.38% African American, 6.15% Native American, and 27.37% from two or more races. Hispanic or Latino of any race were 6.15% of the population.

There were 61 households, out of which 34.4% had children under the age of 18 living with them, 37.7% were married couples living together, 14.8% had a female householder with no husband present, and 32.8% were non-families. 27.9% of all households were made up of individuals, and 18.0% had someone living alone who was 65 years of age or older. The average household size was 2.93 and the average family size was 3.59.

In the town, the population was spread out, with 38.5% under the age of 18, 6.1% from 18 to 24, 26.8% from 25 to 44, 19.0% from 45 to 64, and 9.5% who were 65 years of age or older. The median age was 28 years. For every 100 females, there were 98.9 males. For every 100 females age 18 and over, there were 107.5 males.

The median income for a household in the town was $16,875, and the median income for a family was $18,750. Males had a median income of $29,500 versus $18,125 for females. The per capita income for the town was $9,743. About 34.1% of families and 42.6% of the population were below the poverty line, including 49.1% of those under the age of 18 and 39.1% of those 65 or over.
