= Page, Oklahoma =

- Unincorporated community
- Location within Oklahoma Location within the United States
- Coordinates: 34°42′38″N 94°32′59″W
- Country: United States
- State: Oklahoma
- County: LeFlore
- Elevation: 922 ft (281 m)
- Time zone: UTC-6 (Central (CST))
  - Summer (DST): UTC-5 (CDT)
- Area codes: 539/918
- GNIS feature ID: 1100715

Page is an unincorporated community in Le Flore County, Oklahoma, United States. Page is located along U.S. routes 59 and 270, 5.5 miles (8.9 km) west of the Arkansas border.

== History ==
A post office was established at Page, Indian Territory on April 6, 1896. It was named for William C. Page, a prominent Choctaw Indian.

At the time of its founding, Page was located in Wade County, a part of the Apukshunnubbee District of the Choctaw Nation.
