= Haikey Creek =

Waterway in Oklahoma, US

Coordinates: 35.996°N 95.850°W

Location
- Country: United States
- State: Oklahoma

Haikey Creek and its tributaries drain about 40 square miles in Tulsa County, Oklahoma, US, bounded generally by an irregular line along 61st and 71st Streets on the north, the Arkansas River on the south, Memorial Drive on the west and 145th East Avenue on the east. Within the area are Haikey Park, the Haikey Creek Wastewater Treatment Plant, and Haikey Chapel.

== History ==
Haikey is the name of a Creek Indian family with a number of descendants still living in Tulsa and Broken Arrow today. The chapel, an Indian Methodist church, was built in 1913 with lumber hauled from Sapulpa by Ben B. Haikey, patriarch of the family whose son C. Ben Haikey had founded the church a few years earlier in a brush arbor. The church is located in Section 24, Township 18N, and Range 13E.

== Levee ==
Construction of the levee was completed in October 1985. The structure is an earthen levee 5,860 feet long with an 11.4 foot maximum height and a crown width of 10 feet. The levee has 1-on-3 slopes and an average height of 8.5 feet. The flood of record occurred on June 8, 1974.
