= List of U.S. Highways in Oklahoma =

- Highway markers for US-64 and US-412

System information
- Formed: National system formed November 11, 1926, by BPR; Designations applied in Oklahoma December 7, 1926

Highway names
- US Highways: U.S. Highway X (US-X)

System links
- Oklahoma State Highway System; Interstate; US; State; Turnpikes

United States Numbered Highways in Oklahoma are part of a nationwide network of roadways passing through the 48 contiguous states. These U.S. Highways are the second-highest category of road classifications in the Oklahoma road system, just below the Interstate Highways. U.S. Highways are marked with a number contained inside a white shield in a black box. The number is generally even if the highway runs east–west, and generally odd if it runs north–south, though there are many substantial deviations from this plan.

== Mainline highways ==
Number	Length (mi)	Length (km)	Southern or western terminus	Northern or eastern terminus	Formed	Removed	Notes
US 54	56.07	90.24	Texas state line in Texhoma	Kansas state line northeast of Tyrone	1926	current	
US 56	71.17	114.54	New Mexico state line southwest of Felt	Kansas state line south of Elkhart, Kan.	1956	current	
US 59	216.47	348.37	Arkansas state line southeast of Page	Kansas state line north of Welch	1935	current	
US 60	352.39	567.12	Texas state line east of Higgins, Tex.	Missouri state line south of Seneca, Mo.	1930	current	
US 62	402.49	647.74	Texas state line west of Hollis	Arkansas state line east of Westville	1931	current	
US 64	591.24	951.51	New Mexico state line southwest of Felt	Arkansas state line east of Moffett	1926	current	
US 66	374.6	602.9	Texas state line west of Erick	Kansas state line south of Baxter Springs, Kan.	1926	1985	Replaced by I-40 and SH-66
US 69	260.82	419.75	Texas state line south of Colbert	Kansas state line north of Picher	1935	current	
US 70	289.81	466.40	Texas state line south of Davidson	Arkansas state line west of DeQueen, Ark.	1926	current	
US 73	—	—	US-75 in Atoka	Kansas state line north of Picher	1926	1935	Replaced by US-69
US 75	249.42	401.40	Texas state line south of Colbert	Kansas state line north of Copan	1926	current	
US 77	267.21	430.03	Texas state line south of Thackerville	Kansas state line north of Newkirk	1926	current	
US 81	229.28	368.99	Texas state line south of Terral	Kansas state line north of Renfrow	1927	current	
US 83	36.32	58.45	Texas state line south of Gray	Kansas state line north of Turpin	1930	current	
US 164	—	—	Texas state line east of Higgins, Tex.	Enid	1926	1930	Replaced by US-60
US 169	73.67	118.56	US-64 / Creek Turnpike / Memorial Drive in Tulsa	Kansas state line north of Lenapah	1935	current	
US 177	229.25	368.94	US-70 / SH-199 in Madill	Kansas state line north of Braman	1928	current	
US 183	219.94	353.96	Texas state line south of Davidson	Kansas state line north of Buffalo	1938	current	
US 259	98.33	158.25	Texas state line south of Harris	US-59 west of Page	1963	current	
US 266	43.09	69.35	US-62 / US-75 north of Henryetta	US-64 / SH-2 in Warner	1926	current	
US 270	476.86	767.43	Kansas state line north of Turpin	Arkansas state line east of Page	1931	current	
US 271	158.32	254.79	Texas state line south of Hugo	Arkansas state line northeast of Pocola	1926	current	
US 277	124.47	200.32	Texas state line southwest of Randlett	I-44 / US-62 in Newcastle	1930	current	
US 281	255.57	411.30	Texas state line southwest of Randlett	Kansas state line north of Alva	1938	current	
US 283	203.31	327.20	Texas state line south of Altus	Kansas state line northeast of Rosston	1931	current	
US 287	41.41	66.64	Texas state line northwest of Stratford, Tex.	Colorado state line north of Boise City	1940	current	
US 377	139.91	225.16	Texas state line south of Madill	Stroud	1964	current	Concurrent with SH-99 for its entire length in Oklahoma
US 385	35.98	57.90	Texas state line south of Boise City	Colorado state line north of Boise City	1958	current	
US 412	504.11	811.29	New Mexico state line west of Boise City	Arkansas state line in West Siloam Springs	1988	current	The highway designations made redundant by US-412 were removed, effective December 12, 1988.
Former

== Special routes ==
Number	Length (mi)	Length (km)	Southern or western terminus	Northern or eastern terminus	Formed	Removed	Notes
Temp. US 56	—	—	—	—	1957	1961	Served Boise City–Elkhart, Kan.; now US 412/US 56/US 64/SH-3 and SH-95
Temp. US 59	—	—	—	—	1935	1935	Served Maud, Tex.–Page; now US 59
US 59 Byp.	—	—	—	—	2003	current	Serves Poteau
US 59 Alt.	—	—	—	—	1935	1935	Served Ft. Smith, Ark.–West Siloam Springs; became US 59
Temp. US 59	—	—	—	—	1935	1936	Served Ft. Smith, Ark.–West Siloam Springs; now US 412
US 60 Bus.	—	—	—	—	—	—	Serves Tonkawa
US 60 Bus.	—	—	—	—	—	—	Serves Ponca City
City US 60	—	—	—	—	1938	—	Served Ponca City
US 60 Bus.	—	—	US-60 northeast of Wyandotte	Missouri state line west of Seneca, Mo.	1965	current	Serves Seneca, Mo.
US 62 Bus.	7.6	12.2	—	—	1973	current	Serves Snyder
Temp. US 62	—	—	—	—	1997	—	Served Lawton
Temp. US 62	—	—	—	—	1961	1961	Served Oklahoma City
US 62 Bus.	2.94	4.73	—	—	—	—	Serves Henryetta; concurrent with US 75 Bus. and I-40 Bus.
US 62 Bus.	—	—	—	—	1960	current	Serves Muskogee
US 62 Bus.	—	—	—	—	—	—	Serves Tahlequah
US 64 Bus.	—	—	—	—	1967	2009	Served Enid
US 64 Bus.	4.8	7.7	—	—	1960	current	Serves Muskogee
US 66 Bus.	—	—	—	—	—	—	Served Clinton
City US 66	—	—	—	—	1941	1959	Served Clinton
US 66 Bus.	—	—	—	—	1958	1979	Served Oklahoma City
City US 66	—	—	—	—	1954	1958	Served Oklahoma City
US 69 Bus.	—	—	—	—	1966	current	Serves Durant
US 69 Bus.	—	—	—	—	1964	current	Serves McAlester
US 69 Bus.	—	—	—	—	1964	current	Serves Eufaula
US 69 Bus.	—	—	—	—	1974	current	Serves Checotah; decommissioned from 1979-1990
City US 69	—	—	—	—	1952	—	Served Commerce; former US 66, became US 69 Bus.
US 69 Alt.	20.3	32.7	US 69 south of Picher	Kansas state line south of Baxter Springs	1985	current	Serves Ottawa County and Cherokee County, Kan.; former routing of US-66
City US 70	—	—	—	—	1941	1941	Served Wilson
US 70 Byp.	—	—	—	—	—	—	Served Durant
US 70 Truck	—	—	—	—	1967	—	Served Durant
US 70 Bus.	5	8.0	—	—	1981	current	Serves Hugo
US 70 Byp.	—	—	—	—	1995	current	Serves Idabel
US 75 Bus.	—	—	—	—	—	—	Serves Durant
US 75 Bus.	2.94	4.73	—	—	1967	current	Serves Henryetta; concurrent with US 62 Bus. and I-40 Bus.
US 75 Alt.	30.15	48.52	US-75/SH-16 east of Beggs	I-44 in Sapulpa	1959	current	Former routing of US 75
Temp. US 75	—	—	—	—	1965	1966	Served Oakhurst–Owasso
Temp. US 75	—	—	—	—	1966	1970	Served Oakhurst–Owasso
US 75 Bus.	—	—	—	—	1966	1973	Served Tulsa; became US 75
US 77 Bus.	—	—	—	—	1964	—	Served Ardmore; became US 70
US 77 Alt.	—	—	—	—	1954	—	Served Oklahoma City; former US 77
US 77 Bus.	—	—	—	—	1951	1965	Served Perry
US 77 Alt.	—	—	—	—	1952	1966	Served Ponca City; became US 77
US 77 Bus.	—	—	—	—	1953	1965	Served Ponca City
City US 77	—	—	—	—	1938	1953	Served Ponca City; became US 77 Bus.
US 81 Alt.	—	—	—	—	1950	1960	Served Waurika; became US 70 and SH-5
City US 81	—	—	—	—	1951	—	Served Duncan
US 81 Bus.	—	—	—	—	1971	current	Serves Rush Springs
Temp. US 169	—	—	—	—	1965	1966	Served Tulsa; became US 66 (now I-40) and I-44
US 169 Alt.	2.7	4.3	—	—	—	—	Serves Nowata
US 183 Alt.	—	—	—	—	—	1959	Served Clinton
US 259 Byp.	—	—	—	—	1995	2000	Served Idabel; became US 259
US 270 Bus.	—	—	—	—	—	—	Serves Shawnee
US 270 Bus.	—	—	—	—	—	—	Serves Wewoka
US 270 Bus.	—	—	—	—	—	—	Serves Holdenville
US 271 Bus.	4.2	6.8	—	—	1962	current	Serves Hugo
US 281 Bus.	—	—	—	—	1967	current	Serves Lawton
US 281 Spur	—	—	—	—	—	—	Serves Geary
US 412 Alt.	33.81	54.41	—	—	2012	current	Formerly designated US-412 Scenic
Former
