= Turnpikes of Oklahoma =

US state highway system

- Highway markers for the Kickapoo and Kilpatrick Turnpikes
- Turnpikes highlighted in red

Highway names
- Interstates: Interstate nn (I-nn)
- US Highways: U.S. Highway nn (US nn)
- State: State Highway nn (SH-nn)

System links
- Oklahoma State Highway System; Interstate; US; State; Turnpikes

Oklahoma has an extensive turnpike system, maintained by the state government through the Oklahoma Turnpike Authority. All of Oklahoma's turnpikes are controlled-access highways with at least four lanes, except for the Chickasaw Turnpike, which has only two lanes.

Tolls on Oklahoma's turnpikes are collected through the Pikepass transponder system or PlatePay, a cashless pay-by-mail system. In November 2024 the cash toll booths on the Will Rogers Turnpike closed, making the entire turnpike system cashless.

== Turnpikes ==
- The Cherokee Turnpike is part of U.S. Highway 412 (US 412) in eastern Oklahoma.
- The Chickasaw Turnpike connects US 177 just north of Sulphur to State Highway 1 (SH-1) south of Ada. The turnpike is two lanes for its entire length.
- The Cimarron Turnpike begins at Interstate 35 (I-35) in Noble County (east of Enid) and ends in the western suburbs of Tulsa. The turnpike is part of US 412. It also has a spur to the southwest to US 177 north of Stillwater.
- The Creek Turnpike runs around the outskirts of Tulsa, forming a southern bypass of Tulsa's core area. The Creek Turnpike terminates at I-44 on the west end and I-44/US 412 on the east end, and acts as a bridge between the Turner and Will Rogers Turnpikes.
- The Gilcrease Turnpike is a 2 1/2-mile (4.0 km) tolled extension of the Gilcrease Expressway in Tulsa, completing the west side of the Tulsa loop in 2022.
- The H. E. Bailey Turnpike serves southwestern Oklahoma and is part of I-44. The H.E. Bailey turnpike has two separate parts, with a free section running through eastern Lawton. This turnpike connects Wichita Falls, Texas to Lawton, Chickasha, and Oklahoma City. It has a spur to the east, the Norman Spur (SH-4), towards Newcastle and Goldsby.
- The Indian Nation Turnpike passes through southeast Oklahoma, beginning at Hugo and angling northwest to end at I-40 south of Henryetta.
- The Kickapoo Turnpike (I-335) runs through eastern Oklahoma County and connects Interstate 44 on the northeast side of Oklahoma City to Interstate 40 on the southeast side.
- The Kilpatrick Turnpike (I-344) runs through the north and west sides of the Oklahoma City metro, running from I-240/SH-152 to I-35/I-44, where it becomes the Turner Turnpike. This route acts as one quarter of a pseudo-beltway, proving access to the suburbs of Yukon and Edmond. An extension to SH-152 was completed in 2020.
- The Muskogee Turnpike begins at SH-51 in Broken Arrow and continues southeast to Muskogee. A second section of the turnpike connects Muskogee to I-40 at Webbers Falls. The two sections are connected by a freeway, carrying part of SH-165.
- The Turner Turnpike was Oklahoma's first turnpike, connecting Oklahoma City and Tulsa. The Turner Turnpike parallels historic US 66 (now SH-66), and carries I-44.
- The Will Rogers Turnpike connects Tulsa to the Missouri state line near Joplin. Like the Turner Turnpike, this turnpike serves as a parallel route to US 66 and carries I-44. The rest area near Vinita is promoted as containing the World's Largest McDonald's.

=== Surveyed but not built ===
Shortly after the Turner Turnpike was built in 1953, the Oklahoma Turnpike Authority proposed other toll roads including one to be built from Oklahoma City north to the Kansas border near Braman to tie in with the southern terminus of the Kansas Turnpike at the state line. That routing was included as part of the Federal Highway Act of 1956 which created the Interstate Highway System. As a result, the OTA could not obtain financing to build that proposed turnpike and turned the initial plans including surveys and blueprints over to the Oklahoma Department of Transportation in 1956 for the construction of I-35 as a freeway on that same alignment, which was completed in several stages between 1958 and 1962.

Also proposed but never built was a toll road roughly following what would later become I-35 between Oklahoma City and the Red River north of Gainesville, Texas that included a spur route veering from the main route north of Ardmore veering northeastward past Ada to tie in with the Turner Turnpike near Stroud, Oklahoma.

Also proposed in the 1990s, but never built was an extension of the Muskogee Turnpike from its current southeastern terminus at I-40 southeastward toward Poteau.

=== Proposed Turnpikes ===
- The Toby Keith Expressway (Formerly known as the East-West Connector) is a proposed turnpike which would run through the southern suburbs of Oklahoma City and parts of Norman. It would extend from the Kickapoo Turnpike (I-335) to I-44 in Newcastle. It was originally going to have frontage roads throughout the entire length, however they would be removed from the plans in some areas.
- The South Extension Turnpike is a proposed turnpike which would connect part of the East-West Connector to I-35 in Purcell.
- The Tri-City Connector is a proposed turnpike which would go around OKC Will Rogers International Airport to connect Airport Road (I-240) with I-44.

== Payment methods ==
=== PikePass ===
PikePass is the electronic toll collection system used by the Oklahoma Turnpike Authority. Created in 1990 and launched on January 1, 1991, PikePass provides an alternative to paying cash tolls. Most customers pay an initial $40 in prepaid tolls, which they can refill at their own convenience or have funds automatically withdrawn to replenish the account if it falls below a threshold. PikePass usage results in an approximately 50% savings on tolls compared to image-based tolling methods such as PlatePay.

==== Interoperability ====
Oklahoma is part of the Central Plains Interoperability Area, which allows electronic toll collection transponders issued from member agencies to be used on other tollways in the area. As of August 31, 2026, PikePass transponders can be used on all turnpikes in Illinois, Indiana, Kansas, Massachusetts, North Carolina, Pennsylvania, Texas, and most turnpikes in Florida and Colorado. Oklahoma turnpikes also accept all transponders from Kansas (K-TAG), Texas (EZ TAG, TollTag, TxTag), SunPass from Florida, and ExpressToll from Colorado. Interoperable transponders from these states receive the same 50% discount on tolls that is offered to PikePass users.

=== PlatePay ===
PlatePay is a cashless tolling system used by the Oklahoma Turnpike Authority for customers without a PikePass or interoperable transponder. Customers using PlatePay travel in the same lanes as PikePass customers when passing through a toll plaza and are not required to stop at a toll booth. Automatic license plate recognition is used with vehicle registration data to identify the registered owner of the vehicle, and an invoice is mailed for their toll which is paid through an online portal or by check. Due to added costs with processing, mailing and handling, PlatePay toll rates are significantly higher than both the PikePass rates and the previous cash rates.

PlatePay was first installed at the Peoria/Elm interchange on the Creek Turnpike, and went live on January 5, 2017. During this time the Peoria/Elm interchange operated as a special cashless interchange within an otherwise cash-based system while preparations were made for a broader roll-out across the system. PlatePay was phased in across the remainder of the Oklahoma turnpike system between July 2021 and November 2024.

== Criticism ==
The turnpike system has received criticism from many, most notably from Gary Richardson, former U.S. Attorney and candidate for Governor of Oklahoma in 2002 and 2018, who has called for the abolition of the Turnpike Authority. Critics have noted the lack of revenue from turnpikes that actually goes to the state of Oklahoma. The OTA counters that it receives no tax money to maintain, operate, and pay off the turnpike system; and, if the state had to pay routine maintenance and capital rehabilitation on the turnpikes, the cost to the government would be an additional $105 million annually.
