= L.L. Tisdale Parkway =

Highway in Oklahoma

- L.L. Tisdale Parkway highlighted in red

Route information
- Length: 3.2 mi (5.1 km)
- Existed: 1986–present

Major junctions
- South end: I-244 / US 64 / US 412 / SH-51 in Tulsa
- Gilcrease Expressway in Tulsa
- North end: 36th Street North in Tulsa

Location
- Country: United States
- State: Oklahoma
- Counties: Tulsa, Osage

Highway system
- Oklahoma State Highway System; Interstate; US; State; Turnpikes

The L.L. Tisdale Parkway is a 3.2-mile-long (5.1 km) expressway that runs through northwest Tulsa. The highway is named in honor of local Tulsa pastor, Rev. L.L. Tisdale. The parkway was originally known as the Osage Expressway, as part of a cancelled freeway project to Pawhuska, the capitol of the Osage Nation.

== Route description ==
The parkway begins as a four-lane divided freeway at an interchange with I-244/US 64/US 412/SH-51 just outside Downtown Tulsa. It runs north weaving into Osage County before returning to Tulsa County in Tulsa. At an intersection with the Gilcrease Expressway, the parkway becomes a three-lane undivided expressway at before ending at 36th Street North in Northern Tulsa. It is the Osage Nation's only expressway.

== History ==
Plans for the expressway were almost abandoned in 1983 by the Oklahoma Department of Transportation due to a lack of funding and other roads needing the funds. The highway was later funded entirely by the residents of Tulsa. Construction began on the Osage Expressway in 1986 and was completed in 1993, running from Interstate 244 to Apache Street. The expressway was extended further north in 1995 to 36th Street North, with construction finishing in 1997. With the northern extension, the Osage Expressway was renamed L.L. Tisdale Parkway in honor of the Reverend L.L. Tisdale.

== Exit list ==
The entire route is in Tulsa. All exits are unnumbered.

County	mi	km	Destinations	Notes
Tulsa	0.00	0.00	I-244 west / US 64 east / SH-51 east – Broken Arrow, Oklahoma City US 64 west / SH-51 west (US 412 west) to Cimarron Turnpike west – Sand Springs	Southern terminus
Tulsa	0.2	0.32	I-244 east / US 412 east – Downtown	Southbound exit and northbound entrance; exit 5C on I-244
Tulsa	0.3	0.48	Fairview Street	Southbound exit and northbound entrance
Tulsa–Osage county line	0.9	1.4	Pine Street – Gilcrease Museum	
Osage	1.8	2.9	Apache Street	
Tulsa	2.9	4.7	Northern end of freeway section	
Tulsa	2.9	4.7	Gilcrease Expressway – Tulsa Botanic Garden	At-grade intersection
Tulsa	3.2	5.1	36th Street North	Northern terminus; at-grade intersection
1.000 mi = 1.609 km; 1.000 km = 0.621 mi: Incomplete access
