= Interstate 444 =

Unsigned Interstate Highway in Tulsa, OK

Interstate 444
- Cherokee Expressway, Inner Dispersal Loop
- I-444 highlighted in red

Route information
- Auxiliary route of I-44
- Maintained by ODOT
- Length: 2.86 mi (4.60 km)
- Existed: 1970s–present
- Component highways: US 75 (entire length); US 64 / SH-51 (first two miles)
- NHS: Entire route

Major junctions
- West end: I-244 / US 64 / US 75 / SH-51 in Tulsa
- East end: I-244 / US 75 / US 412 in Tulsa

Location
- Country: United States
- State: Oklahoma
- Counties: Tulsa

Highway system
- Interstate Highway System; Main; Auxiliary; Suffixed; Business; Future; Oklahoma State Highway System; Interstate; US; State; Turnpikes
← US 412	→ SH-1

Interstate 444 (I-444) is an unsigned auxiliary route of Interstate 44 located in Tulsa, Oklahoma. It is part of the Interstate Highway System and makes up half of Tulsa's Inner Dispersal Loop (IDL), forming a partial beltway around Downtown Tulsa. Both ends of I-444 terminate at I-244, which makes up the other half of the IDL.

The route is signed in its entirety as U.S. Highway 75 (US 75); the first half is also signed as US 64 and State Highway 51 (SH-51), and the latter half is known as the Cherokee Expressway. The 2.86-mile-long (4.60 km) freeway was first planned around 1957 with construction occurring into the 1970s before being fully open in 1981. I-444 was originally signed as such until 1995.

== Route description ==
I-444 begins at its western terminus near the Arkansas River on the southwest side of Downtown Tulsa. It serves traffic heading to and from locations including Okmulgee, Oklahoma City, and Sand Springs, Oklahoma, as well as Joplin, Missouri. It splits from a complete interchange with I-244, which is also known as the Red Fork Expressway, at exit 4B and borders the southern side of downtown. I-444 carries concurrencies with US 64, US 75, and SH-51. A mile east, there is an incomplete junction at 11th Street and Houston Avenue that allows westbound traffic to exit and eastbound traffic to enter from 12th street. The next interchange provides access to 13th Street, Denver Avenue, and Cheyenne Avenue. Westbound movements here are also made from 12th street.

I-444 continues east before it turns to the north with US 75. US 64 and SH-51 split from I-444 at this point and continue eastward as the Broken Arrow Expressway. On the eastern side of downtown, I-444 is known as the Cherokee Expressway. A full junction allows vehicles to exit at 7th Street and enter from 8th street. I-444 then reaches its eastern terminus on the northeast side of downtown at another interchange with I-244, this time at exit 6B. I-244 now carries US 412, and is known as the Crosstown Expressway. Eastbound exiting traffic heads towards Joplin while westbound exiting traffic is signed for Oklahoma City. The US 75 freeway continues northbound as the Cherokee Expressway towards Bartlesville.

The total length of I-444 is 2.86 miles (4.60 km) long and serves Tulsa. It makes up the eastern and southern sections of the Inner Dispersal Loop.

== History ==
Plans to enclose portions of Tulsa with Interstate Highways existed as early as 1957. Labeled as "Tulsa's Comprehensive Plan", the IDL would develop a beltway around Downtown Tulsa. Construction on these freeways continued into the late 1970s. The final portion opened on November 5, 1981.

Both I-244 and I-444 initially used exit numbers and milemarkers that continued counting from where they split at I-44. This resulted in I-444 utilizing numbers in the 90s, despite being less than three miles long. I-444 was later resigned to avoid confusion caused from the previous numbering scheme. In 1995, further confusion between I-244 and I-444 prompted the Oklahoma Department of Transportation (ODOT) to convert I-444 into an unsigned route in favor of signing its concurrencies instead. At this point, the exit numbers were removed from signs leaving only the lettered suffixes. These letters were also eventually removed from signs.

In 2021, the Oklahoma House of Representatives tentatively approved a study to explore future alternatives to the Inner Dispersal Loop due to its appearance and expensive cost to maintain.

== Exit list ==
Exit numbers and mileposts no longer exist. The entire route is in Tulsa, Tulsa County.

mi	km	Old exit	New exit	Destinations	Notes
0.00	0.00	94A	1A	I-244 west / US 75 south – Okmulgee, Oklahoma City	Western end of US 75 concurrency; western terminus; I-244 exit 4B
0.00	0.00	94B	1B	I-244 east / US 64 / SH-51 – Sand Springs, Joplin	Western end of US 64/SH-51 concurrency; westbound exit and eastbound entrance; I-244 exit 4B
		94C	1C	11th Street, Houston Avenue	Westbound exit and eastbound entrance
		94D	1D	13th Street, Denver Avenue, Cheyenne Avenue	
		95	2	US 64 / SH-51 east – Broken Arrow	Eastern end of US 64/SH-51 concurrency
		96A	3A	7th Street – Downtown	
2.51	4.04	96B–C	3B–C	I-244 / US 412 – Joplin, Oklahoma City	I-244 exit 6B
2.86	4.60			US 75 north – Bartlesville	Northern end of US 75 concurrency; freeway continues as US 75
1.000 mi = 1.609 km; 1.000 km = 0.621 mi: Concurrency terminus; Incomplete access
