= U.S. Route 75 in Oklahoma =

Section of Numbered Highway in Oklahoma, United States

U.S. Highway 75
- US 75 highlighted in red

Route information
- Maintained by ODOT
- Length: 249.42 mi (401.40 km)

Major junctions
- South end: US 69 / US 75 at the Texas state line in Colbert
- US 70 in Durant; US 69 in Atoka; US 270 in Calvin; I-40 / US 62 from Pharoah to Henryetta; US 266 in Henryetta; US 62 in Okmulgee; I-44 in Tulsa; I-244 / US 64 / SH-51 / Future I-42 / US 412 in Tulsa; US 60 in Bartlesville
- North end: US-75 at the Kansas state line in Caney, KS

Location
- Country: United States
- State: Oklahoma
- Counties: Bryan, Atoka, Coal, Hughes, Okfuskee, Okmulgee, Tulsa, Washington

Highway system
- United States Numbered Highway System; List; Special; Divided; Oklahoma State Highway System; Interstate; US; State; Turnpikes
← SH-74	→ SH-76

U.S. Route 75 (US 75) is a major north–south highway that enters the U.S. state of Oklahoma from Texas concurrent with US 69 crossing the Red River. US 75 serves the city of Tulsa, the 2nd largest city in Oklahoma.

== Route description ==
US 75 enters the state concurrent with US 69 as a freeway. The freeway status drops between Colbert and Calera. The two highways regain their freeway status in Durant. This freeway ends about 12 miles north of Durant. The two highways split in Atoka. Through traffic traveling to Tulsa usually uses US 69 to the Indian Nation Turnpike as a faster route.

Leaving Atoka, US 75 serves many small communities and crosses the Canadian River before reaching I-40/US 62 about 82 miles northwest of Atoka. The three highways travel east to Henryetta. US 62 and US 75 leave I-40 at an interchange with the Indian Nation Turnpike. The two highways serve as a major route through the town. US 62 leaves US 75 in Okmulgee.

Coming out of Okmulgee, US 75 starts to enter a more urban area traveling into Tulsa. US 75 becomes a freeway in Glenpool, interchanging with the Creek Turnpike in Jenks. US 75 travels through western Tulsa before reaching an interchange at I-244. The two highways travel into Downtown Tulsa together, where US 75 splits off with a short overlap with US 64/SH 51. US 75 leaves downtown crossing I-244 for a second time.

US 75 serves north Tulsa before returning to a surface highway. From here, the highway travels to Kansas, only passing through the major community of Bartlesville.

== Tulsa expressways ==
The following is list of names for the expressway part of US 75 in the Tulsa area.

- Okmulgee-Bee Line Expressway (Okmulgee to Creek Turnpike)
- Okmulgee Expressway (Creek Turnpike to I-244)
- Martin Luther King, Junior Memorial Expressway (overlap with I-244)
- Broken Arrow Expressway (southern leg of Inner Dispersal Loop)
- Paul Harvey Memorial Expressway (eastern leg of the Inner Dispersal Loop)
- Chapelle Family Memorial Expressway (Inner Dispersal Loop to East 56th Street North)
- Cherokee Expressway (56th Street and north).

== Junction list ==
County	Location	mi	km	Exit	Destinations	Notes
Bryan	Red River	0.00	0.00		US 75 south (US 69 south) – Denison	Continuation into Texas
see US 69
Atoka	Atoka	47.2	76.0		US 69 north – McAlester, Tulsa	Northern end of US 69 concurrency
Coal	Coalgate	60.0	96.6		SH-43	Western terminus of SH-43
Coal	Coalgate	60.5	97.4		SH-31 west	Southern end of SH-31 concurrency
Coal	Coalgate	60.6	97.5		SH-31 east – McAlester	Northern end of SH-31 concurrency
Coal		64.3	103.5		SH-3 west – Ada	Northern end of SH-3 concurrency
Hughes	Calvin	92.1	148.2		US 270 east / SH-1	Interchange; southern end of US 270 concurrency
Hughes	Horntown	100.7	162.1		US 270 west	Northern end of US 270 concurrency
Hughes	Wetumka	110.8	178.3		SH-9	
Okfuskee	Weleetka	121.4	195.4		SH-84	Western terminus of SH-84
Okfuskee	Pharoah	128.0	206.0		I-40 west / US 62 east – Oklahoma City	Southern end of I-40/US 62 concurrency, I-40 exit 231
Okmulgee	Henryetta	133.9	215.5	237	I-40 BL / US 62 Bus. / US 75 Bus. – Henryetta	Exit number follows I-40
Okmulgee	Henryetta	136.7	220.0		I-40 east / Indian Nation Turnpike south – Fort Smith, McAlester, Dallas	Northern end of I-40 concurrency, south end of BL-40 concurrency; I-40 exit 240
Okmulgee	Henryetta	137.5	221.3		I-40 BL west (Main Street) / US 62 Bus. west / US 75 Bus. south	Northern end of I-40 BL concurrency
Okmulgee	Henryetta	138.9	223.5		US 266 east (Dewar Avenue) – Dewar, Grayson	Western terminus of US 266
Okmulgee	Okmulgee	149.5	240.6		US 62 east (E. 21st Street) – Morris, Muskogee	Northern end of US 62 concurrency
Okmulgee	Okmulgee	150.5	242.2		SH-56 west – Okmulgee State Park	Eastern terminus of SH-56
Okmulgee	Okmulgee	152.2	244.9		SH-56 Loop south – Green Country Technology Center	Western terminus of SH-56 Loop
Okmulgee	Preston	155.1	249.6		Preston Road	Proposed interchange
Okmulgee		159.2	256.2	—	US 75 Alt. north / SH-16 – Beggs, Muskogee	Interchange, southern terminus of US 75 Alt.
Tulsa	Glenpool	173.3	278.9	—	SH-67 – Kiefer, Bixby	Interchange
Tulsa	Glenpool	174.4	280.7	—	141st Street South	Interchange
Tulsa	Jenks	176.4	283.9	—	SH-117 (121st Street South) – Sapulpa	Interchange; southern end of freeway
Tulsa	Jenks	177.7	286.0	—	111th Street South	Southbound exit and northbound entrance
Tulsa	Jenks	177.9	286.3	—	Creek Turnpike (SH-364) – Oklahoma City, Broken Arrow	
Tulsa	Jenks	179.0	288.1	—	Main Street – Jenks	
Tulsa	Tulsa	180.5	290.5	—	81st Street South	
Tulsa	Tulsa	181.4	291.9	—	71st Street South	
Tulsa	Tulsa	182.5	293.7	—	61st Street South	
Tulsa	Tulsa	183.4	295.2	—	I-44 / SH-66 – Sapulpa, Oklahoma City, Claremore, Joplin	I-44 exit 224
Tulsa	Tulsa	184.6	297.1	—	41st Street South / Union Avenue	
Tulsa	Tulsa	185.4	298.4	—	I-244 west (Red Fork Expressway) – Oklahoma City	Southern end of I-244 concurrency; southbound exit and northbound left entrance; I-244 west exit 2
Tulsa	Tulsa	186.3	299.8	3A	Southwest Boulevard	Exit numbers follow I-244; no southbound exit
Tulsa	Tulsa	187.1	301.1	3B	21st Street / Union Avenue	Southbound exit only
Tulsa	Tulsa			4A	17th Street / Southwest Boulevard – OSU College of Osteo. Med.	Southbound exit and northbound entrance
Tulsa	Tulsa	187.5	301.8	—	I-244 east / US 64 west / SH-51 west (Red Fork Expressway) – Joplin, Sand Springs; I-444 begins	Northern end of I-244 concurrency; southern end of I-444/US 64/SH-51 concurrency; western terminus of unsigned I-444; I-244 exit 4B
Tulsa	Tulsa	See I-444				
Tulsa	Tulsa	190.1	305.9	—	Future I-42 / I-244 / US 412 / 1st Street – Joplin, Oklahoma City; I-444 ends	Northern end of I-444 concurrency; eastern terminus of unsigned I-444; 1st St. not signed northbound; I-244 exit 6B
Tulsa	Tulsa	190.6	306.7	—	Peoria Avenue	Northbound exit and southbound entrance
Tulsa	Tulsa	190.9	307.2	—	Pine Street	
Tulsa	Tulsa	192.4	309.6	—	Apache Street / Lewis Avenue	
Tulsa	Tulsa	192.8– 193.0	310.3– 310.6	—	Gilcrease Expressway west	
Tulsa	Tulsa	192.8– 193.0	310.3– 310.6	—	SH-11 east (Gilcrease Expressway) – Tulsa International Airport	Southern end of SH-11 concurrency
Tulsa	Tulsa	193.8	311.9	—	SH-11 west (36th Street North)	Northern end of SH-11 concurrency
Tulsa	Tulsa	195.8	315.1	—	56th Street North (SH-11B)	
Tulsa		196.8	316.7	—	66th Street North	
Tulsa		198.2	319.0	—	76th Street North	
Tulsa		198.9	320.1	—	86th Street North – Owasso, Sperry	Northern end of freeway
Tulsa		202.0	325.1	—	116th Street North	Interchange
Tulsa	Skiatook–Collinsville line	204.9	329.8	—	SH-20 – Collinsville, Skiatook	Interchange
Washington		220.1	354.2	—	County Road 3000	Interchange
Washington		225.2	362.4		County Road 2500	Interchange
Washington	Bartlesville	230.3	370.6		US 60 east	Southern end of US 60 concurrency
Washington	Bartlesville	231.4	372.4		US 60 west – Pawhuska, Ponca City	Interchange; northern end of US 60 concurrency
Washington	Dewey	234.3	377.1		SH-123	Northern terminus of SH-123
Washington		241.6	388.8		SH-10 west	Southern end of SH-10 concurrency
Washington	Copan	242.7	390.6		SH-10 east	Northern end of SH-10 concurrency
Washington		249.4	401.4		US-75 north – Independence	Continuation into Kansas
1.000 mi = 1.609 km; 1.000 km = 0.621 mi: Concurrency terminus; Electronic toll collection; Incomplete access; Unopened

U.S. Route 75
Previous state: Texas	Oklahoma	Next state: Kansas
