= Gilcrease Expressway =

Highway in Tulsa County, Oklahoma, United States

- Gilcrease Expressway highlighted in red

Route information
- Maintained by ODOT
- Length: 16.7 mi (26.9 km)
- Component highways: SH-344 from I-44 to US-64; SH-11 from US-75 to I-244

Western segment
- Length: 6.2 mi (10.0 km)
- South end: I-44 / SH-66 in Sapulpa
- Major intersections: US 64 / US 412 / SH-51 near Sand Springs
- North end: Edison Street in Tulsa

Eastern segment
- Length: 10.5 mi (16.9 km)
- West end: 41st West Avenue in Tulsa
- Major intersections: L.L. Tisdale Parkway in Tulsa; US 75 / SH-11 in Tulsa
- East end: I-244 / US 412 in Tulsa

Location
- Country: United States
- State: Oklahoma

Highway system
- Oklahoma State Highway System; Interstate; US; State; Turnpikes

The Gilcrease Expressway is a 16.7-mile-long (26.9 km) highway in Tulsa County, Oklahoma, United States. It is part of the county's long-term plan to complete an outer highway loop around Tulsa's central business district. The highway will connect Interstate 44 (I-44) in Sapulpa to I-244 near Tulsa International Airport.

== Route description ==
The eastern segment of the highway runs from North 41st West Avenue east to Interstate 244. From US-75 to I-244/US-412, the Gilcrease carries the easternmost part of State Highway 11. The currently existing highway serves Tulsa International Airport and surrounding areas.

Additionally, the Gilcrease Expressway Extension has been constructed. On October 29, 2015, Governor Mary Fallin announced Driving Forward, a $892 million turnpike package. A five-mile (8.0 km) tolled extension of the Gilcrease Expressway was included in the package. The project began in the third quarter of 2016.

On June 4, 2018, the Oklahoma Transportation Commission approved the designation Oklahoma State Highway 344 for the highway, to take effect upon completion of construction. The extension opened on November 14, 2022.

== Future ==
In 2010, the Oklahoma Legislature authorized the Oklahoma Turnpike Authority to study the construction of a turnpike to complete the Gilcrease Expressway. The cost of the turnpike was estimated at $373 million for the final 6.7 miles (10.8 km) of the expressway.

The next portion of the Gilcrease Expressway to be constructed is the segment between 41st West Avenue and Edison Street in West Tulsa. Although, the section between 41st West Avenue and Edison Street is named 31st Street North, 53rd West Avenue, Newton Street and 57th West Avenue.

Many homes have been removed along 57th West Avenue between West 26th Street and West 21st Street. Plans include construction of a bridge over the Arkansas River, connecting Sand Springs and Berryhill.

$88 million of a $918.7 million tax increase will be put forward to the expressway's extension.

== Junction list ==
The entire route is in Tulsa County.

Location	mi	km	Exit	Destinations	Notes
Sapulpa	0.00	0.00		I-44 / SH-66 – Joplin, Sapulpa, Oklahoma City SH-344 begins	Southern terminus; southern terminus of SH-344; exits 223A-B on I-44
Oakhurst	0.9	1.4	1	51st Street	
Oakhurst	1.5	2.4	Toll Gantry		
Oakhurst	2.0	3.2	2	41st Street South	
	2.7	4.3	Toll Gantry		
	4.0	6.4	4	21st Street South / Avery Drive	
Tulsa	4.9	7.9	Toll Gantry		
	5.6	9.0		US 64 / US 412 / SH-51 SH-344 ends	Northern terminus of SH-344
Tulsa	6.2	10.0	Northern end of limited-access section		
Tulsa	6.2	10.0		Edison Street	Current northern terminus
Gap in route
Tulsa	0.0	0.0		41st West Avenue	Current western terminus
Tulsa	2.2	3.5		L.L. Tisdale Parkway – Downtown Tulsa, Gilcrease Museum	
Tulsa	2.2	3.5	Western end of freeway section		
Tulsa	3.5	5.6		Peoria Avenue / Mohawk Boulevard	
Tulsa	4.4	7.1		Lewis Avenue	
Tulsa	5.0	8.0		US 75 / SH-11 west – Okmulgee, Downtown Tulsa, Bartlesville	Western end of SH-11 concurrency
Tulsa	5.6	9.0		Harvard Avenue	
Tulsa	6.5	10.5		Yale Avenue	
Tulsa	7.5	12.1		Apache Street / Sheridan Road – Tulsa Zoo	Apache Street not signed westbound
Tulsa	8.5	13.7		Virgin Street – Airport Terminal	Virgin Street not signed eastbound
Tulsa	9.1	14.6		Memorial Drive / Pine Street	Signed for Memorial Drive eastbound, Pine Street westbound
Tulsa	10.5	16.9		I-244 / US 412 to US 169 – Joplin, Downtown SH-11 ends	Eastern terminus; eastern terminus of SH-11; exit 12B on I-244
1.000 mi = 1.609 km; 1.000 km = 0.621 mi: Concurrency terminus; Electronic toll collection; Incomplete access
