= Gilcrease =

Gilcrease may refer to:

- Thomas Gilcrease (1890–1962), American oilman, art collector and philanthropist
- Gilcrease Museum, museum located northwest of downtown Tulsa, Oklahoma
- Gilcrease Expressway, highway in Tulsa County, Oklahoma
