= Special routes of U.S. Route 75 =

Special routes of U.S. Route 75

Highway system
- United States Numbered Highway System; List; Special; Divided

Six special routes of U.S. Route 75 exist. Two routes exist in Oklahoma, two in Kansas, one in Nebraska, and two in Iowa.

== Henryetta business loop ==
U.S. Highway 75 Business
- Location: Henryetta, Oklahoma
- Length: 2.94 mi (4.73 km)

The first special route along U.S. 75 is U.S. Route 75 Business in Henryetta, Oklahoma, in Okmulgee County. The route is 2.94 miles (4.73 km) in length. It begins at I-40 exit 237 west of town. It then continues east through the town to end at US-62/75 east of downtown. The entirety of the route is concurrent with Business Loop I-40 and U.S. 62 Business.

=== Major intersections ===
The entire route is in Henryetta, Okmulgee County.

mi	km	Destinations	Notes
0.00	0.00	I-40 / US 62 / US 75 / I-40 BL begins / US 62 Bus. begins – Oklahoma City	Southern terminus; I-40 exit 237; south end of I-40 Bus/US 62 Bus concurrency
2.94	4.73	US 62 / US 75 / I-40 BL ends / US 62 Bus. ends – Tulsa	Northern terminus; north end of I-40 Bus/US 62 Bus concurrency
1.000 mi = 1.609 km; 1.000 km = 0.621 mi: Concurrency terminus

== Beggs–Sapulpa alternate route ==
U.S. Highway 75 Alternate
- Location: Beggs–Sapulpa, Oklahoma
- Length: 30.15 mi (48.52 km)

U.S. Route 75 Alternate, the only such special route stemming from U.S. 75, is a former alignment of the mainline highway from east of Beggs to Sapulpa, Oklahoma, a suburb of Tulsa. The route is 30.15 miles (48.52 km) long. U.S. 75 Alternate is also sporadically signed as U.S. 75A and State Highway 75A.

The highway begins at U.S. 75 east of Beggs and travels west to that town, where it turns north. It runs through the towns of Mounds and Kiefer before reaching Sapulpa. In Sapulpa, its northern terminus is explicitly signed at an intersection with State Highway 66 and other state highways, but official Oklahoma Department of Transportation maps show it extending northeast along SH-66 until the point where it merges with I-44.

U.S. 75 followed what is now U.S. 75 Alternate prior to 1959. On August 28 of that year, mainline U.S. 75 was rerouted onto the new Okmulgee Beeline freeway and expressway, and U.S. 75 Alternate was established along the former route of the highway.

== Altoona business loop ==
U.S. Highway 75 Business
- Location: Altoona, Kansas
- Length: 1.6 mi (2.6 km)

=== Major intersections ===
The entire route is in Wilson County.

Location	mi	km	Destinations	Notes
	0.00	0.00	US-75	Southern terminus; northbound exit and southbound entrance
Altoona			K-47	
			US-75 – Topeka	Northern terminus; southbound exit and northbound entrance
1.000 mi = 1.609 km; 1.000 km = 0.621 mi: Incomplete access

== Topeka business loop ==
U.S. Highway 75 Business
- Location: Topeka, Kansas

== Nebraska City business loop ==
U.S. Highway 75 Business
- Location: Nebraska City, Nebraska
- Length: 5.2 mi (8.4 km)

=== Major intersections ===
The entire route is in Otoe County.

Location	mi	km	Destinations	Notes
Nebraska City	0.00	0.00	US 75 south (Lewis and Clark Trail south) – Auburn N-2 east – Iowa US 75 north / N-2 west (Lewis and Clark Trail north) – Omaha, Lincoln	Interchange; southern terminus of US 75 Bus.; road continues south as US 75/LCT (64th Road)
Nebraska City	1.4	2.3	4th Corso (N-2 Bus.)	
Belmont–Wyoming precinct line	5.2	8.4	US 75 (58 Road)	Northern terminus of US 75 Bus.; road continues west as G Road
1.000 mi = 1.609 km; 1.000 km = 0.621 mi

== Sioux City business loop ==
U.S. Highway 75 Business
- Location: Sioux City, Iowa
- Length: 10.334 mi (16.631 km)
- Existed: 2001–present

U.S. Highway 75 Business in Sioux City, Iowa was created in 2001 after the completion of a freeway around Sioux City. Officially, US 75 Business is known as Iowa Highway 376, but it is never signed as such. The route begins at the I-29/I-129/US 20/US 75 interchange in Sioux City and follows US 75's former route through Sioux City, rejoining US 75 on the city's northern edge.

The entire route is in Sioux City, Woodbury County.

mi	km	Exit	Destinations	Notes
0.000	0.000	144	I-29 north / I-129 west / US 20 / US 75 – Fort Dodge, Le Mars, South Sioux City	Northern end of I-29 overlap; exit number follows I-29
0.821	1.321	—	I-29 south – Council Bluffs	Southern end of I-29 overlap; exit 143 on I-29
4.199	6.758	—	Transit Avenue / Cunningham Drive	
4.867	7.833	—	Leech Avenue	At-grade intersection; southbound exit provides westbound access
5.060	8.143	—	US 20 Bus. (Gordon Drive) to I-29 / US 77 – Business District	
9.406	15.137	99	CR D12 (Floyd Boulevard) / 46th Street	Exit number not signed southbound; provides access to US 75 south
10.334	16.631	—	US 75 north – Le Mars	Northbound exit and southbound entrance only
1.000 mi = 1.609 km; 1.000 km = 0.621 mi: Concurrency terminus; Incomplete access

Northbound US 75 Business traffic follows I-29 southbound.

== Le Mars business loop ==
U.S. Highway 75 Business
- Location: Le Mars, Iowa
- Length: 3.082 mi (4.960 km)
- Existed: 2006–present

U.S. Route 75 Business in Le Mars, Iowa was created in 2006 after the completion of a by-pass around Le Mars. The business route begins at the Iowa Highway 3 interchange, with which the US 75 Business runs concurrently, and ends at the new US 75/Iowa 60 interchange. The portion of US 75 Business that is not concurrent with Iowa 3 is officially known as Iowa 404, but it is never signed as such. The entire route is in Le Mars, Plymouth County.

mi	km	Destinations	Notes
0.000	0.000	US 75 / Iowa 3 west	Southern terminus. Southern end of IA 3 overlap.
1.453	2.338	Iowa 3 east (Plymouth Street) / Iowa 404 north (5th Avenue NW)	Northern end of IA 3 overlap. IA 404 begins.
3.082	4.960	US 75 / Iowa 60 north / Iowa 404 south	Northern terminus. IA 60 begins. IA 404 ends.
1.000 mi = 1.609 km; 1.000 km = 0.621 mi

== Former routes ==
=== Galveston–Houston temporary route ===
Temporary U.S. Highway 75
- Location: Galveston–Houston, Texas
- Length: 50 mi (80 km)
- Existed: 1951

=== Houston business loop ===
Business U.S. Highway 75
- Location: Houston, Texas
- Length: 11 mi (18 km)
- Existed: 1942–1944

=== Denison-Sherman business loop ===
Business U.S. Highway 75
- Location: Denison-Sherman, Texas
- Length: 8.2 mi (13.2 km)
- Existed: 1990–1994

Business U.S. Highway 75-C or Bus. US 75-C ran from US 69 in Denison southwest to US 75 in Sherman as a replacement for Loop 93. On December 21, 1994, the highway was cancelled and redesignated as Texas State Highway 91 and extension of Texas State Highway Spur 503.

=== Oakhurst-Owasso temporary route ===
U.S. Highway 75 Temporary
- Location: Oakhurst–Owasso, Oklahoma
- Existed: 1965–1970

=== Tulsa business route ===
U.S. Highway 75 Business
- Location: Tulsa, Oklahoma
- Existed: 1966–1973

=== Wakarusa–North Topeka alternate ===
U.S. Highway 75 Alternate
- Location: Wakarusa–North Topeka, Kansas
- Length: 9 mi (14 km)
- Existed: 1964–1965

=== Topeka bypass route ===
U.S. Highway 75 Bypass
- Location: Topeka, Kansas
- Length: 11 mi (18 km)
- Existed: 1966–1998

=== North Topeka–Hoyt alternate ===
U.S. Highway 75 Alternate
- Location: North Topeka–Hoyt, Kansas
- Length: 9 mi (14 km)
- Existed: 1964–1988

Browse numbered routes
← Iowa 370	→ Iowa 404
← Iowa 376	→ Iowa 415
