= Inner Dispersal Loop =

The Inner Dispersal Loop is a collection of freeways that encircle Downtown Tulsa, Oklahoma.

Inner Dispersal Loop may also refer to:

- Interstate 244, a portion of which makes up the western and northern sections of the Inner Dispersal Loop
- Interstate 444, the entirety of which makes up the southern and eastern sections of the Inner Dispersal Loop
