= Atlas Life Building =

- U.S. National Register of Historic Places
- U.S. Historic district – Contributing property
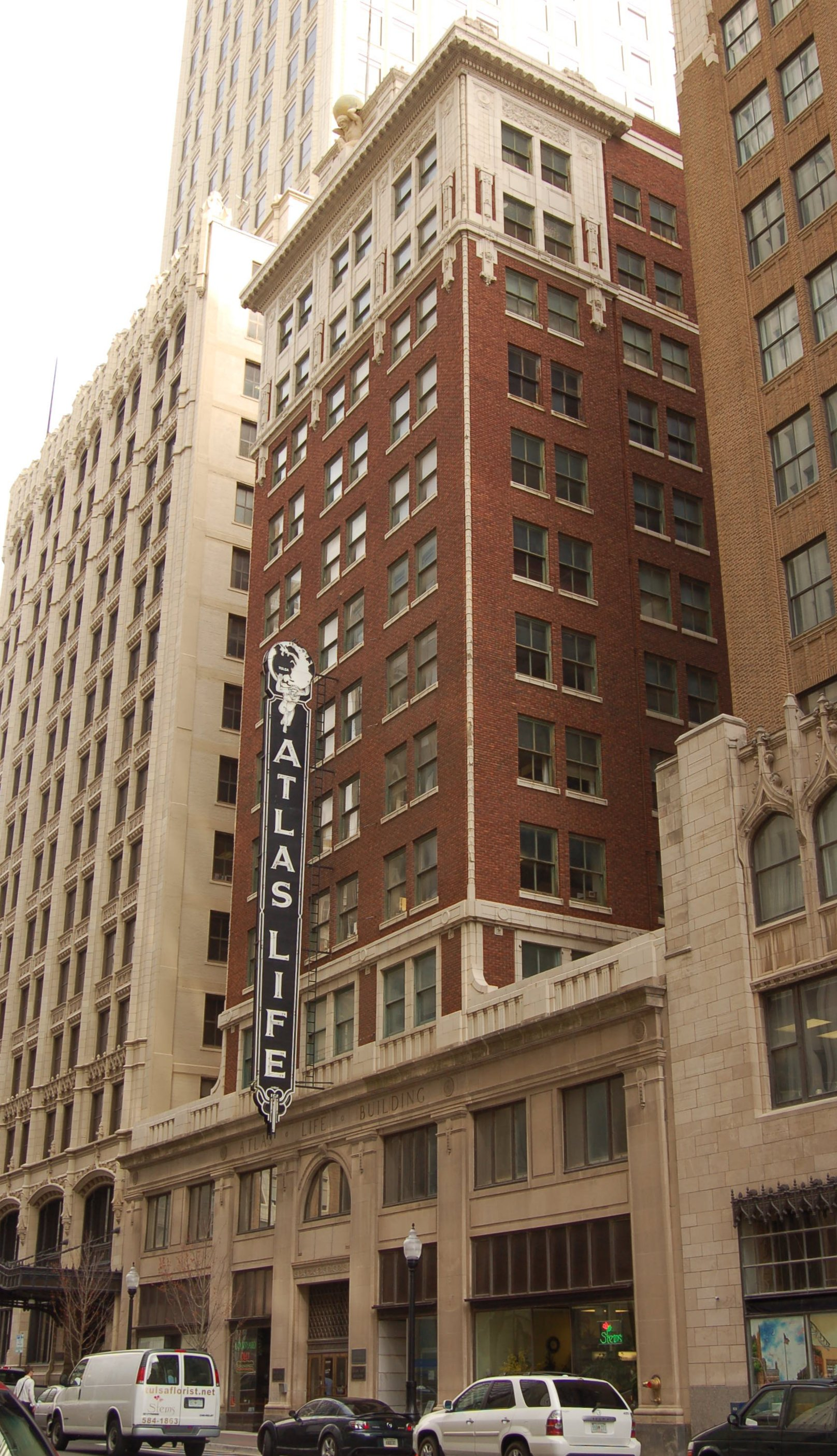
- Atlas Life Building, in 2008

- Location within Oklahoma Location within the United States
- Location: 415 S. Boston Ave., Tulsa, Oklahoma, USA
- Coordinates: 36°9′8″N 95°59′20″W
- NRHP reference No.: 09000358
- Added to NRHP: May 21, 2009

The Atlas Life Building is a historic twelve-story building in downtown Tulsa, Oklahoma. Designed by the firm Rush, Endacott and Rush, the building was completed in 1922. It is located at 415 S. Boston Avenue, sandwiched between the Philtower and Mid-Continent Tower. On May 19, 2009, it was added to the U.S. National Register of Historic Places. Originally an office building, it was converted to the Courtyard by Marriott Tulsa Downtown hotel in 2010.

== Atlas Life Insurance Company ==
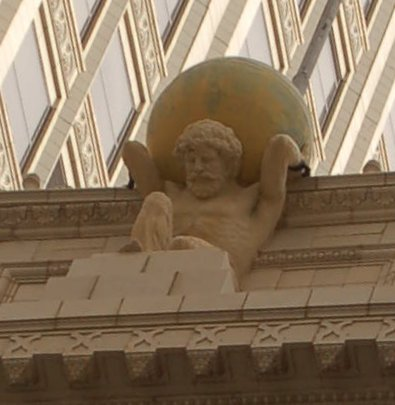
Atlas Statue

Atlas Life Insurance Company was founded in Tulsa in 1918. Within three years it had grown so rapidly that it had begun constructing its own high-rise office building. An elaborate ceremony accompanied its grand opening on November 22, 1922. The company's logo incorporated a figure of Atlas, a Titan of ancient Greek mythology, carrying the world on his back. A statue representing this is on top of the building facade. The company remained in business at this location until it was sold in 1991.

== Building description ==
The building's most recognizable feature is the four-story neon sign above the main entrance, which makes the Atlas Life Building a popular local landmark. The sign was installed in 1946, and has been retained by subsequent owners of the building. The ground floor occupies the entire 100-foot by 140-foot property. The second floor is T-shaped, with the top of the T fronting on Boston Avenue, while the remaining floors are 50 feet by 140 feet, centered above the ground floor. The building itself is faced with red brick, with white marble ornamentation concentrated at the third, eleventh, and twelfth floors. At the top is an ornate cornice surmounted by a crouching statue of Atlas. The building is seven bays wide at the base, narrowing to three above the second floor to allow some separation from the taller buildings on either side.

The building has an area of 86,231 square feet (8,011.1 m^{2}). The ground floor of the Atlas Life Building is home to the Tulsa Press Club, Baytide Petroleum and The New Atlas Grill.

== Building ownership ==
In 1991, State Mutual Insurance Company purchased Atlas Life Insurance Company and moved all its operations to Georgia. The Pearson Group acquired the building in 1997 from Tulsa Public Schools. On January 6, 2006, the building was sold by the Pearson Group to Navajo Properties LLC, a company affiliated with investor Maurice Kanbar. In 2008, Kanbar sold the building to new owners; it was then adapted for reuse as the Courtyard by Marriott Tulsa Downtown hotel in 2010.
