= Berryhill Public Schools =

School district in Oklahoma

Address
- 3128 South 63rd West Avenue Tulsa, Oklahoma, 74107; United States

District information
- Grades: Pre-school - 12
- Superintendent: Mike Campbell
- NCES District ID: 4004020

Students and staff
- Enrollment: 1,133 (2020-2021)
- Staff: 68.26 (on an FTE basis)
- Student–teacher ratio: 16.60

Other information
- Telephone: 918-446-1966
- Website: www.berryhillschools.org

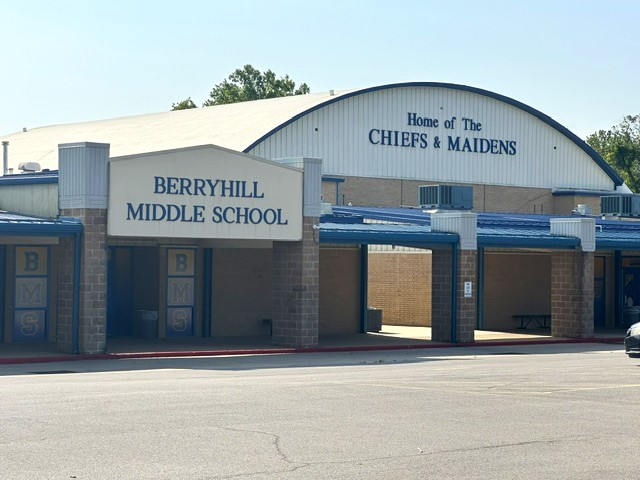
Berryhill Middle School, July 2026

The Berryhill Public Schools is a public school district in Tulsa County, Oklahoma, United States, based in an unincorporated area.

It includes portions of Oakhurst, Sand Springs, and Tulsa.

== Schools ==
The Berryhill Public Schools has an early childhood center, two elementary schools, one middle school, and one high school

=== Early childhood center ===
- Berryhill Early Childhood Center

=== Elementary schools ===
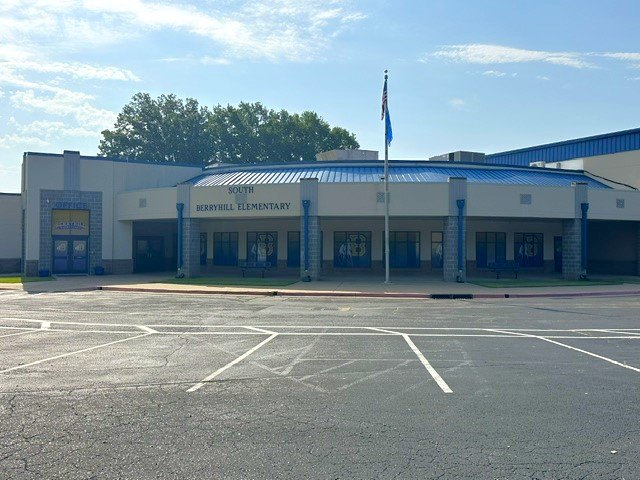
Berryhill South Elementary School, 7-2026

- North Elementary School
- South Elementary School

=== Middle school ===
- Berryhill Middle School

=== High school ===
- Berryhill High School

=== Alumni ===
- Jeremy smith defensive end for Tulsa;
- Kirk Flemings Berryhill Fire Fighter;
- The Funderburk Brothers
- Alex Jones: 17 Time State Champion Band Member
- Timothy Christensen: 3 Time State Champion Baritone, Trombone, and Bass Trombone, and actor of Lucas Beineke
- Zach Jackson drafted by the Toronto Blue Jays in the third round of the 2016 Major League Baseball draft, currently plays for the Oakland A's.
- Dean Green drafted by the Detroit Tigers in the 11th round of the 2011 Major League Baseball draft.

=== Activities ===
Berryhill's marching band program, the "Blue and Gold Brigade"or simply "The Brigade", has enjoyed great success in spite of its small size. They have achieved, most notably; thirty-one state-champion titles by the Oklahoma Bandmasters' Association; a sixteen-year winning streak as state champions at the OBA 1A-3A State Marching Band lasting from 2004 to 2022; numerous 'superior' ratings at OSSAA regional marching competitions; copious amounts of other awards from other competitions. The Berryhill Jazz Band has also earned 15 state titles throughout its tenure.
