= Oklahoma State Highway 51 =

Highway in Oklahoma

State Highway 51

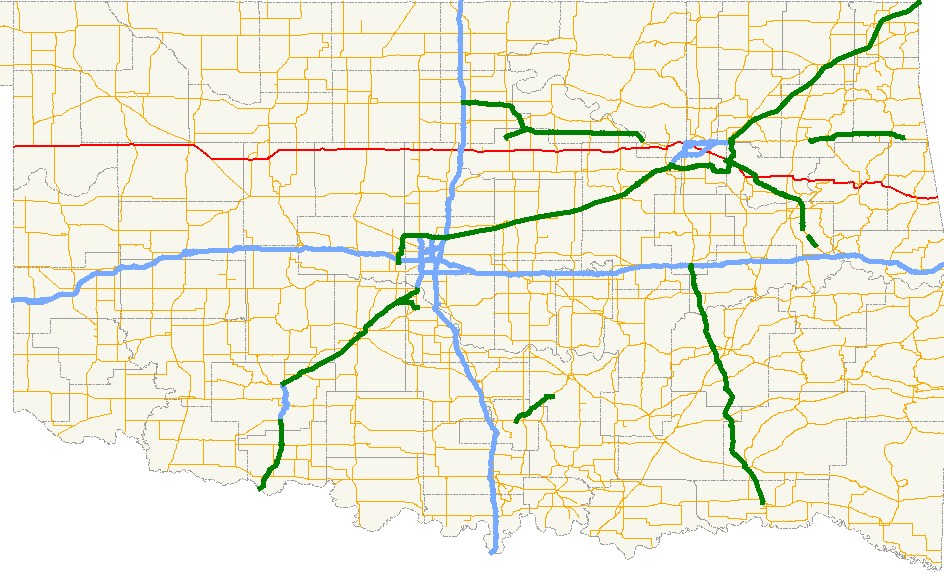

Route information
- Maintained by ODOT
- Length: 332.8 mi (535.6 km)
- Existed: June 1, 1927–present

Major junctions
- West end: US 60 at the Texas state line near Higgins, TX
- I-35 in Orlando; I-244 in Tulsa; I-444 in Tulsa; I-44 in Tulsa; Muskogee Turnpike in Broken Arrow
- East end: AR 244 at the Arkansas state line near Tolu, AR

Location
- Country: United States
- State: Oklahoma
- Counties: Ellis, Dewey, Blaine, Kingfisher, Logan, Payne, Creek, Tulsa, Wagoner, Cherokee, Adair

Highway system
- Oklahoma State Highway System; Interstate; US; State; Turnpikes
← SH-50	→ SH-52

State Highway 51, abbreviated to SH-51 or OK-51, is a major state highway in Oklahoma, United States. It runs for 332.8 miles (535.6 km) east–west across the state, running from the Texas state line to Arkansas. It is the third-longest state highway in the system.

== Route description ==
=== Texas to I-35 ===
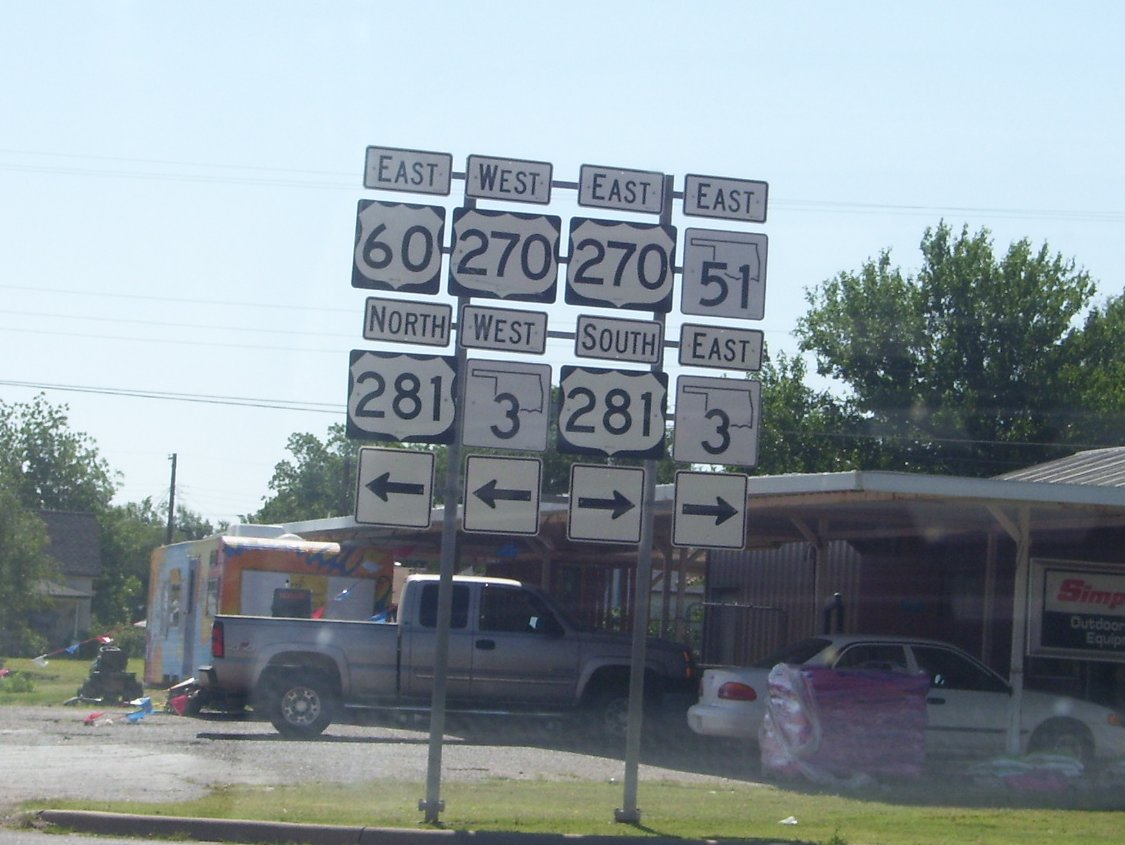
SH-51 meets many different highways in Seiling

SH-51 begins at the Texas line concurrent with US-60 just east of Higgins, Texas. It remains concurrent for 61 miles (98 km) until it reaches US-270/US-281/SH-3 at Seiling, Oklahoma. At Seiling, SH-51 joins with those three highways for nine miles (14 km) before splitting off on its own.

Eleven miles (18 km) after splitting off, Highway 51 meets SH-58 in Canton. It then continues east, crossing the North Canadian River and meeting SH-51A before turning northeast toward Okeene, where it intersects SH-8. SH-51 will go for 24 miles (39 km) before intersecting another highway.

In Hennessey SH-51 meets US-81 before continuing eastward. Seventeen miles (27 km) later, it meets SH-74 north of Crescent. Eleven miles (18 km) to the east, it shares a brief concurrency with US-77; Two miles (3.2 km) later it has an interchange at Interstate 35 at Exit 174.

=== I-35 to Tulsa ===
After crossing I-35, SH-51 becomes a multilane highway and a major corridor linking I-35 to Stillwater, the home of Oklahoma State University. Along this 13-mile (21 km) stretch is an intersection with SH-86. When SH-51 reaches Stillwater, it meets US-177.

Continuing east from Stillwater, the road returns to a two-lane highway at a 1-mile (1.6 km) concurrency with SH-108, and intersects with SH-18 Eight miles (13 km) later. Four miles (6.4 km) east of this, it passes through Yale, Oklahoma before crossing SH-99. It becomes a multilane highway again after SH-48. It turns into the "Mannford Freeway" before passing through the small towns of Mannford and Lotsee on its way toward the Tulsa area.

=== Tulsa and beyond ===
In Sand Springs, SH-51 crosses the Arkansas River with SH-97 before merging onto the Sand Springs Expressway (US-412/US-64). When this freeway ends at I-244 near downtown Tulsa, SH-51 merges onto I-244 southbound only to exit 1 mile (1.6 km) later, where it runs concurrent with US-64/US-75. This freeway is actually Interstate 444, but the route is not signed as such. After one more mile, SH-51 leaves the interstate with US-64 and becomes the Broken Arrow Expressway, a freeway running northwest–southeast through Tulsa which is known as "The BA" by locals and local media. US-64 leaves the freeway as a concurrency with US-169 southbound. Later, SH-51 will exit the freeway and become a four-lane highway toward Coweta. The mainline freeway becomes the Muskogee Turnpike.

At Coweta, SH-51 turns back east after heading southeast through the Tulsa area. After crossing the Muskogee Turnpike again and bridging the Verdigris River the highway soon enters Wagoner, where it junctions with US-69. Returning once again to a 2-lane road, Highway 51 crosses Ft. Gibson Lake and the town of Hulbert. Eleven miles (18 km) later, it passes through Tahlequah, where it has a brief concurrency with US-62/SH-10. After spitting with these highways, it heads southeast toward Stilwell, Oklahoma, running concurrent with US-59 for a mile on the way. After leaving Stilwell it provides access to Adair State Park, and then crosses the Arkansas line becoming Arkansas Highway 244, which quickly connects to Arkansas Highway 59.

== History ==
SH-51 was originally commissioned on June 1, 1927, as a connector from Stilwell to Eldon at SH-27 (present-day US-62). By 1928, it had been extended to Tulsa. On June 15, 1933, it was extended to the east to the Arkansas state line, where it became AR-45.

ODOT extended SH-51 west to Stillwater and Perry (via a segment of roadway currently serving as US-177). On March 18, 1935, the section from Stillwater to Perry was rescinded and SH-51 was extended to SH-8 at Okeene. It was then extended to Seiling on October 18, 1938. On March 23, 1943, it was extended to the Texas state line by a concurrency with US-60.

The Broken Arrow Expressway was built in the early 1960s and opened in 1964. It was not, however, officially named the Broken Arrow Expressway until July 6, 1999 by H.B. 1455.

The steel truss bridge carrying SH-51 across Stillwater Creek west of Stillwater, once considered the gateway into the city, was removed on March 25, 2008. In a first for the state of Oklahoma, the bridge, originally built in 1936, was sold to Payne County for $200,000 and transferred to a county road east of Stillwater, where it was installed over Council Creek.

== Major intersections ==
County	Location	mi	km	Destinations	Notes
Ellis		0.0	0.0	US 60 west – Canadian	Continuation into Texas; western end of US 60 concurrency
Ellis		6.7	10.8	US 283 north – Shattuck	Western end of US 283 concurrency
Ellis	Arnett	12.7	20.4	SH-46 north	Southern terminus of SH-46
Ellis	Arnett	13.7	22.0	US 283 south – Cheyenne	Eastern end of US 283 concurrency
Dewey	Vici	39.6	63.7	SH-34 north – Woodward	Western end of SH-34 concurrency
Dewey	Vici	40.5	65.2	SH-34 south – Hammon	Eastern end of SH-34 concurrency
Dewey		58.8	94.6	US 183 – Woodward, Taloga	
Dewey	Seiling	60.6	97.5	US 60 east / US 270 west / US 281 north / SH-3 west – Woodward, Chester	Western end of US-270/US-281/SH-3 concurrency; eastern end of US-60 concurrency
Dewey	Hucmac	69.0	111.0	US 270 east / US 281 south / SH-3 east – Watonga	Eastern end of US-270/US-281/SH-3 concurrency
Blaine	Canton	81.2	130.7	SH-58A north – Canton Lake	Southern terminus of SH-58A
Blaine	Canton	82.0	132.0	SH-58 south – Eagle City	Western end of SH-58 concurrecy
Blaine	Canton	83.0	133.6	SH-58 north – Fairview	Eastern end of SH-58 concurrency
Blaine	Southard	88.1	141.8	SH-51A – Fairview, Watonga	
Blaine	Okeene	98.9	159.2	SH-8 – Fairview, Watonga	
Kingfisher	Lacey	115.1	185.2	SH-132 north – Enid	Southern terminus of SH-132
Kingfisher	Hennessey	122.6	197.3	US 81 – Enid, Kingfisher	
Logan		138.1	222.3	SH-74E north – Marshall	Southern terminus of SH-74E
Logan		140.1	225.5	SH-74 – Covington, Crescent	
Logan		151.0	243.0	US 77 north – Perry	Western end of US-77 concurrency
Logan		151.3	243.5	US 77 south – Guthrie	Eastern end of US-77 concurrency
Payne	Orlando	153.8	247.5	I-35 – Wichita, Oklahoma City	Exit 174 on I-35
Payne		157.3	253.1	SH-86 north – Perry	Southern terminus of SH-86
Payne		162.0	260.7	Road to Lake Carl Blackwell	Southern terminus of the former SH-51C
Payne	Stillwater	170.4	274.2	US 177 – Ponca City, Perkins	
Payne		177.8	286.1	SH-108 north – Glencoe	Western end of SH-108 concurrency
Payne		178.8	287.8	SH-108 south – Ripley	Eastern end of SH-108 concurrency
Payne		186.8	300.6	SH-18 – Pawnee, Cushing	
Creek		197.6	318.0	SH-99 – Jennings, Oilton	
Creek		208.2	335.1	SH-48 – Cleveland, Bristow	
Creek		215.1	346.2	SH-151 north	Interchange; southern terminus of SH-151
Tulsa	Sand Springs	224.3	361.0	SH-97 south – Sapulpa	Western end of SH-97 concurrency
Tulsa	Sand Springs	225.5	362.9	US 64 west / US 412 west / SH-97 north	Eastern end of SH-97 concurrecy; western end of US-64/412 cocurrency; west end of freeway
Tulsa	Sand Springs	226.3	364.2	Adams Road	Westbound exit only
Tulsa	Sand Springs	227.1	365.5	South 81st West Avenue	
Tulsa		228.3	367.4	South 65th West Avenue	
Tulsa		228.8	368.2	SH-344 south (Gilcrease Expressway)	Northern terminus of SH-344
Tulsa	Tulsa	229.7	369.7	North 49th West Avenue	
Tulsa	Tulsa	231.0	371.8	North 33rd West Avenue	Westbound exit and eastbound entrance
Tulsa	Tulsa	231.1	371.9	Gilcrease Museum Road, South 25th West Avenue	
Tulsa	Tulsa	231.8	373.0	Quanah Avenue	Eastbound exit and westbound entrance
Tulsa	Tulsa	232.1	373.5	I-244 east / US 412 east / L.L. Tisdale Parkway north – Tulsa International Airport	Eastern end of US-412 cocurrency; western end of I-244 concurrency; I-244 Exits 5B-C
Tulsa	Tulsa	232.6	374.3	2nd Street – Downtown Tulsa	Eastbound exit and westbound entrance; I-244 Exit 5A
Tulsa	Tulsa	232.9	374.8	I-244 west / US 75 south – Oklahoma City	Eastern end of I-244 concurrency; western end of I-444/US-75 concurrency; I-244 Exit 4B
Tulsa	Tulsa	233.2	375.3	Houston Avenue, Southwest Boulevard, 30th Street	Westbound exit and eastbound entrance
Tulsa	Tulsa	233.6	375.9	13th Street / Denver Avenue / Cheyenne Avenue	
Tulsa	Tulsa	234.3	377.1	US 75 north (I-444) – Bartlesville	Eastern end of I-444/US-75 concurrency
Tulsa	Tulsa	234.8	377.9	Detroit Avenue	Westbound exit and eastbound entrance
Tulsa	Tulsa	234.9	378.0	Utica Avenue	
Tulsa	Tulsa	235.2	378.5	Lewis Avenue	No westbound exit
Tulsa	Tulsa	236.0	379.8	East 15th Street	
Tulsa	Tulsa	236.4	380.4	East 21st Street	
Tulsa	Tulsa	237.1	381.6	Harvard Avenue	
Tulsa	Tulsa	238.1	383.2	East 31st Street, Yale Avenue	
Tulsa	Tulsa	239.2	385.0	Sheridan Road	
Tulsa	Tulsa	239.6	385.6	I-44 / SH-66 – Joplin, Oklahoma City	I-44 Exit 231
Tulsa	Tulsa	240.3	386.7	Memorial Drive	
Tulsa	Tulsa	241.1	388.0	East 41st Street, Mingo Road	No westbound exit
Tulsa	Tulsa	242.0	389.5	US 64 east / US 169 – Bixby, Owasso	Eastern end of US-64 concurrency
Tulsa	Tulsa	242.9	390.9	Garnett Road	
Tulsa	Tulsa	243.4	391.7	51st Street / 129th East Avenue	Eastbound exit and westbound entrance
Tulsa	Broken Arrow	244.8	394.0	Aspen Avenue / 145th East Avenue	
Tulsa	Broken Arrow	245.9	395.7	Elm Place	
Tulsa	Broken Arrow	247.0	397.5	Lynn Lane	No eastbound entrance
Tulsa	Broken Arrow	247.5	398.3	Kenosha Street	
Tulsa	Broken Arrow	248.8	400.4	Muskogee Turnpike east to Creek Turnpike – Muskogee	Eastern end of freeway; no eastbound entrance; Muskogee Turnpike Exit 1
Wagoner	Coweta	258.0	415.2	SH-72 south – Haskell	Northern terminus of SH-72
Wagoner	Coweta	261.5	420.8	Muskogee Turnpike – Tulsa, Muskogee	Muskogee Turnpike Exit 13
Wagoner	Wagoner	272.6	438.7	US 69 – Chouteau, Muskogee	
Wagoner	Wagoner	275.1	442.7	SH-16 south	Northern terminus of SH-16
Cherokee	Hulbert	288.4	464.1	SH-80 west (South Broadway) – Fort Gibson Dam	Eastern terminus of SH-80
Cherokee	Tahlequah	297.3	478.5	SH-51 Spur / Choctaw Street	Southwestern terminus of SH-51 Spur
Cherokee	Tahlequah	300.7	483.9	US 62 west / SH-10 south / SH-82 south / US 62 Bus. north – Muskogee, Vian	Western end of US-62/SH-10/82 concurrency; southern terminus of US BUS 62
Cherokee	Tahlequah	303.0	487.6	SH-82 north / US 62 Bus. west – Locust Grove	Eastern end of SH-82 concurrency; northern terminus of US BUS 62
Cherokee		305.0	490.8	SH-10 north – Kansas	Eastern end of SH-10 concurrency
Cherokee	Eldon	310.7	500.0	US 62 east – Westville	Eastern end of US-62 concurrency
Adair	Stilwell	324.8	522.7	US 59 north – Westville	Western end of US-59 concurrency
Adair	Stilwell	325.7	524.2	US 59 south – Sallisaw	Eastern end of US-59 concurrency
Adair		332.8	535.6	AR 244 to AR 59	Eastern terminus; continuation into Arkansas
1.000 mi = 1.609 km; 1.000 km = 0.621 mi: Concurrency terminus; Incomplete access

== Spurs ==
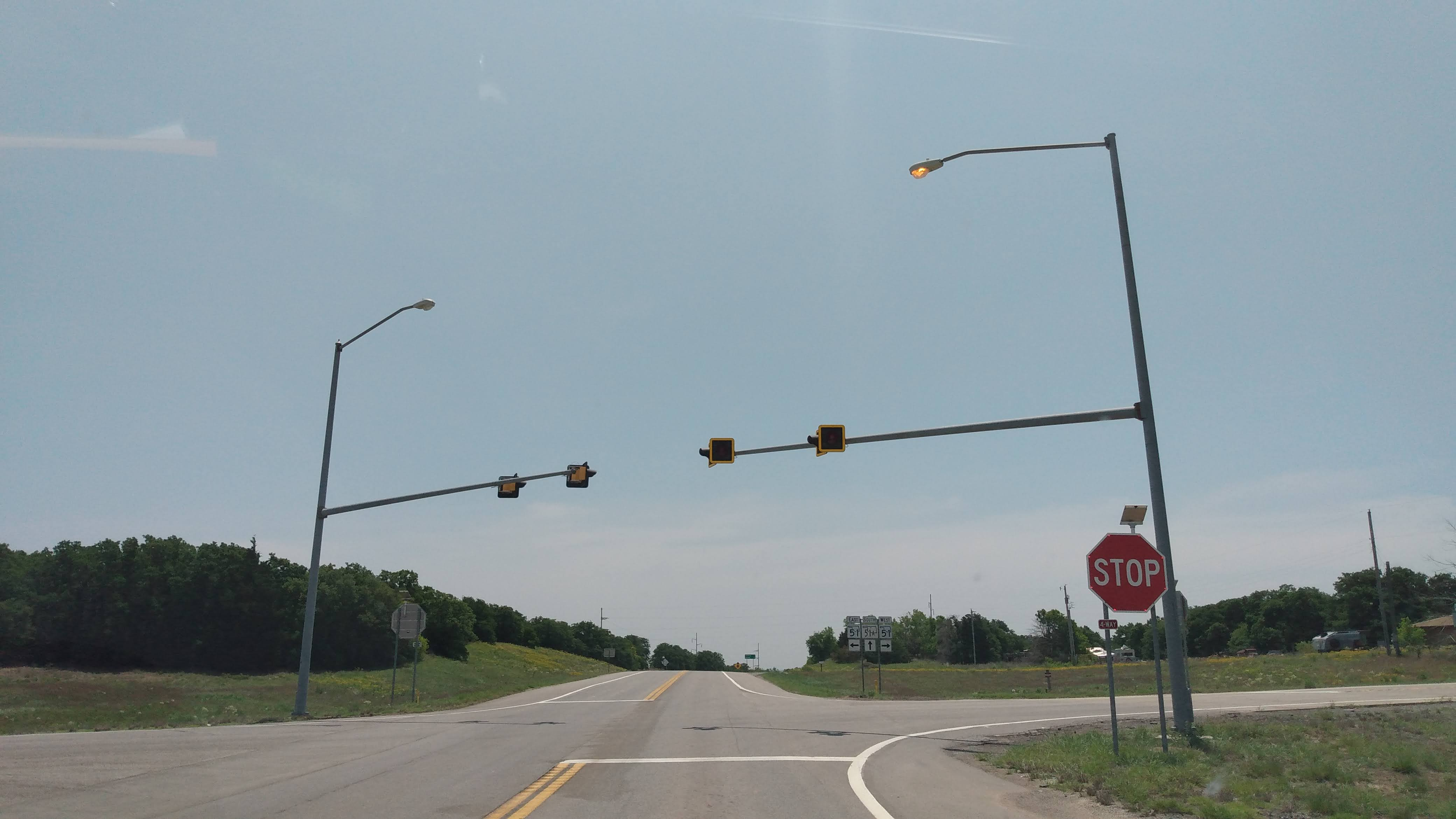
The SH-51 and SH-51A intersection in Southard, Oklahoma in 2023.

Like many in the Oklahoma state highway system, SH-51 has short spurs branching from it that bear the "51" number with a lettered suffix:

- SH-51A (23 miles [37 km]) runs from SH-58 northeast of Canton to SH-8 near Roman Nose State Park. It is the longest suffixed highway in the system.
- SH-51B (18 miles [29 km]) connects Coweta to US-69 north of Muskogee. It goes through the towns of Porter and Tullahassee.
- SH-51C (decommissioned) (1.7 miles [2.7 km]) connected SH-51 west of Stillwater to Carl Blackwell Lake until it was decommissioned in 2005.
- SH-51D (decommissioned) connected SH-51 south of Sand Springs with I-244 in Tulsa, running along Avery Drive and West 21st Street. It appeared on some ODOT maps as late as the 1970s, but is no longer shown.
- In 2004, ODOT completed SH-51 Spur, running for 3 miles (4.8 km) as part of a loop through northwest Tahlequah, serving Tahlequah Municipal Airport, and ending at State Highway 82. It is currently the newest Oklahoma state highway.
