= Tulsa Botanic Garden =

Botanical garden in Osage County, Oklahoma, United States

Coordinates: 36.209117°N 96.059994°W

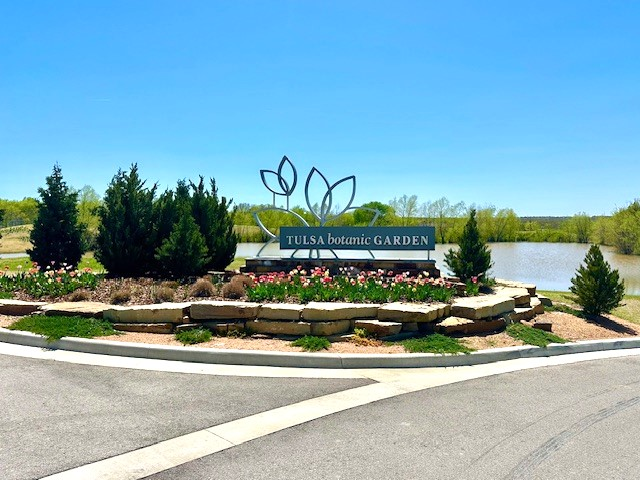
- Main Entrance
- Interactive map of Tulsa Botanic Garden
- Location: Osage County
- Nearest city: Tulsa
- Area: 170 acres (69 ha)
- Website: www.tulsabotanic.org

Tulsa Botanic Garden is a 170 acres (69 ha) botanical garden under ongoing development at 3900 Tulsa Botanic Drive, approximately 8 miles (13 km) northwest of downtown Tulsa, in Osage County, Oklahoma. It is located at the intersection of N 52 W Avenue and W 43 Street N. The mission of Tulsa Botanic Garden is to promote the beauty and importance of plants and nature to create a more sustainable and harmonious world.

== History ==
The project was first conceived in 1999, and called the Oklahoma Centennial Botanical Garden Research and Education Center (OCBG). Pat Woodrum became Executive Director in 2003. (Note: Woodrum had retired from her previous position as Executive Director of the Tulsa City and County Public Library System, where she had worked for 32 years.) In 2004, Persimmon Ridge, LLC donated 170 acres (69 ha) of land for the Garden site. The Oklahoma Centennial Commission awarded grants totaling $2.2 million to the OCBG in 2006 to begin construction on the site. The Assistant Principal Chief of the Osage Nation conducted a Blessing of the Land ceremony for the garden in 2007.

A 7 acres (2.8 ha) lake and 1,200 square feet (110 m^{2}) visitor center were dedicated in 2008, and opened to the public in 2009. F. Todd Lasseigne was named to run the garden in 2011. In 2013, some 1,200 plants were added, and the facility was renamed as the Tulsa Botanic Garden (TBG). Development continued during the following winter in preparation for the garden's April 2014 reopening.

Construction of water and electric mains to the Tulsa Botanic Garden was completed during the summer of 2014. Previously, the facility had to truck in water and use a portable propane generator to supply electricity. During early 2014, the center completed an outdoor shade structure, covering an area of 3,200 square feet (300 m^{2}). This structure will shelter plants that can not be grown in full sunlight. The center plans to build an indoor structure of the same size. Staff offices, which had been in the Harwelden mansion, moved to the center in the fall of 2014.

On October 2, 2014 the Garden announced progress on their first capital campaign, titled "Reaching for Generations”. The campaign, whose goal is to raise $17 million, (Note: The campaign had already raised $10 million by October 2, 2014.) will fund the construction of four gardens: The A.R. and Marylouise Tandy Floral Terraces will be a formal garden, set on four acres, that will showcase colors and textures throughout the season, using ornamental plants including perennials, shrubs and bulbs. The Children’s Discovery Garden is designed as a “wonderland” environment to provide experience-based learning for children and families. The Lotus Pool will highlight aquatic plants, like lotus and water lilies, and be surrounded by the circular All Seasons Garden that will be filled with plants throughout the year.

== Garden Development ==
Groundbreaking for the 3 acres (1.2 ha) A.R. and Marylouise Tandy Floral Terraces was Thursday, November 13, 2014. The $3 million project opened to the public on October 3, 2015.

The Children's Discovery Garden opened on May 15, 2016.

The J.E. and L.E. Mabee Grange building opened December 8, 2017.

The Garden hosted the United States Postal Service First Day of Issue Stamp Ceremony for Winter Berries stamps on September 17, 2019 in the A.R. and Marylouise Tandy Floral Terraces.

Groundbreaking for two new gardens, the Bumgarner Family Foundation Lotus Pool and Stanford Family Liberty Garden was held on March 2, 2022 Lt. Governor Matt Pinnell, Tulsa Mayor G.T. Bynum, Osage Nation Chief Geoffrey Standing Bear and other dignitaries and donors helped open the Lotus Pool and Liberty Garden at the ribbon cutting ceremony and grand opening July 21, 2023

The $2 million Jim and Cherry Bost Arboretum opened on two acres in October of 2024.

The Garden hosts an annual Botanic Garden Of Lights festival "Botanic Garden Of Lights", which is an event that has been held since the winter of 2018. Other annual events include Autumn in the Botanic Garden "Autumn in the Botanic Garden" which has a display and contest of scarecrows made by community members "Enter our Annual Scarecrow Display Contest" and Tulsa Botanic BLOOMS, one of the largest spring flower displays in the state of Oklahoma with over 200,000 daffodils, tulips, hyacinths, crocuses, and other spring flowering bulbs

== Gallery ==
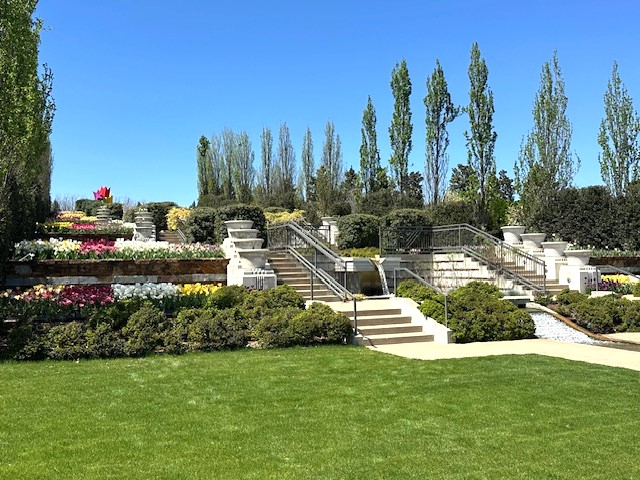
The central staircase up the Tandy Floral Terraces, 4-2025

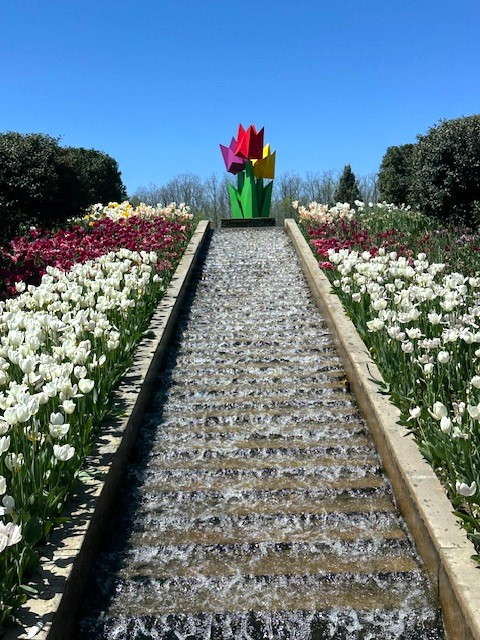
A water feature & artwork amidst the flowers

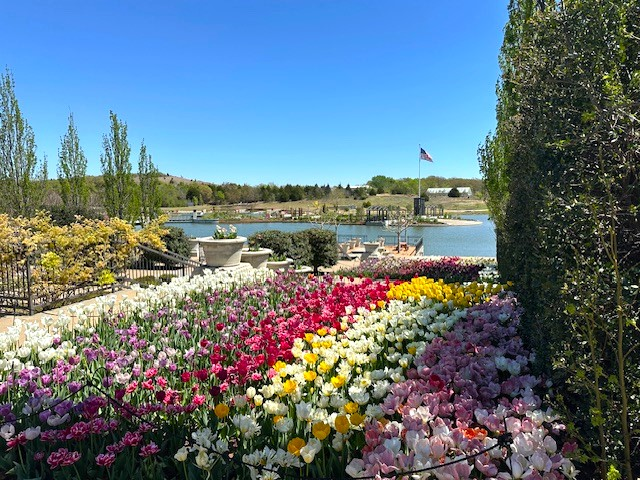
Flowerscape overlooking the 7-acre lake, 4-2025

Spring Giant in the Children’s Discovery Garden; note his lobster nose and fish cheeks

Preparing in September 2026 for BOOtanical: the Autumn Festival & Pumpkin Patch
