= Interstate 244 =

Highway in Oklahoma

Interstate 244
- Red Fork Expressway, Crosstown Expressway
- I-244 highlighted in red

Route information
- Auxiliary route of I-44
- Maintained by ODOT
- Length: 15.75 mi (25.35 km)
- NHS: Entire route

Major junctions
- West end: I-44 / SH-66 in Sapulpa
- US 75 in Tulsa; US 64 / US 75 / SH-51 in Tulsa; Future I-42 / US 64 / US 412 / SH-51 / L.L. Tisdale Parkway in Tulsa; I-444 / US 75 in Tulsa; SH-11 in Tulsa; US 169 in Tulsa
- East end: Future I-42 / I-44 / US 412 / SH-66 in Tulsa

Location
- Country: United States
- State: Oklahoma
- Counties: Tulsa

Highway system
- Interstate Highway System; Main; Auxiliary; Suffixed; Business; Future; Oklahoma State Highway System; Interstate; US; State; Turnpikes
← I-240	→ SH-251A

Interstate 244 (I-244), also known as the Martin Luther King Jr. Memorial Expressway (in honor of Martin Luther King Jr.) since 1984, the Crosstown Expressway and the Red Fork Expressway is a 15.8-mile-long (25.4 km) east–west Interstate Highway bypass route of I-44 around Tulsa, Oklahoma.

At both I-244's western and eastern terminus, the highway connects with I-44. I-244 runs from the western bank of the Arkansas River across the river and past downtown Tulsa, before running through the northern half of the city and connecting again with I-44.

In downtown Tulsa, I-244 forms the northern and western legs of the "Inner Dispersal Loop". The southern and eastern legs are formed by the unsigned I-444 (signed as U.S. Route 75 (US 75).

== Route description ==
I-244 begins at a stack interchange with I-44 (which is concurrent with State Highway 66 (SH-66) at this point). I-244 continues northeast from here, running parallel to Southwest Boulevard. Two interchanges provide access to 33rd West Avenue, 40th Place, and Southwest Boulevard. US 75 northbound then merges into I-244 eastbound at exit 2, forming a concurrency with the Interstate; US 75 south of here is a freeway headed south toward Glenpool and Okmulgee. The next three interchanges only provide partial access to the roads they link to. Exit 3A, which lacks a westbound exit ramp, provides access to Southwest Boulevard; exit 3B to 21st Street and Union Avenue and exit 4A to 17th Street and Southwest Boulevard provide only a westbound exit and eastbound entrance. North of exit 4A, I-244 and US 75 cross the Arkansas River.

Exit 4B marks I-244's entry into the Inner Dispersal Loop (IDL), a ring of freeways encircling Downtown Tulsa. At exit 4B, the southwest corner of the loop, US 75 splits away from I-244, joining I-444 which begins at this interchange and proceeds along the south and east edges of the loop. US 64 and SH-51 westbound join I-244 at this interchange, continuing along the westside of the loop with the Interstate. Two partial interchanges, exits 4C and 5A, provide access to Downtown Tulsa streets. I-244 then reaches the northwest corner of the IDL. At this point lies an interchange with two other freeways. US 64 and SH-51 split away from I-444 here to join westbound US 412, forming the Keystone Expressway. The L.L. Tisdale Parkway continues north from here. I-244 turns east from here, following the north leg of the IDL, joined by US 412 eastbound, which will overlap I-244 for the remainder of the highway. Three more exits to downtown streets are along this leg of the loop. At the northeast corner of the loop, I-244 junctions with I-444, which ends at this interchange and US 75 which continues north toward Bartlesville. I-244 and US 412 exit the loop on an easterly course.

East of the IDL, I-244 and US 412 run generally parallel to Admiral Place. This segment of the Interstate provides access to several major north–south streets, including Lewis, Harvard and Yale avenues. The interchanges at Sheridan Road and Memorial Drive are inverted single-point urban interchanges (SPUI) with lefthand entrance and exit ramps intersecting the surface street at a single traffic signal. East of here, I-244 intersects the Gilcrease Expressway again at its eastern terminus; this interchange also forms the eastern terminus of SH-11 which runs along the Gilcrease for its easternmost stretch. The next interchange to the east, serving Mingo Road, provides an exit for eastbound traffic and an entry to westbound traffic. I-244 then junctions with US 169, the Mingo Valley Expressway (a freeway). East of US 169 lies a parclo interchange with Garnett Road and a partial interchange, providing only an eastbound exit and westbound entrance with 129th East Avenue. I-244 then reaches its eastern terminus at a yield sign where it merges into eastbound I-44/SH-66. US 412 continues east along I-44.

== History ==
I-244 was completed in December 1975. It was named the Martin Luther King Jr. Expressway east from Downtown by the Oklahoma Highway Commission in 1984. The completion of the section that runs through Greenwood ("Black Wall Street") effectively ended generations of Black-American wealth and community cultivation in the previously named district.

The spans carrying I-244/US 75 across the Arkansas River to Downtown Tulsa were built in 1967. A $78 million (equivalent to $110 million in 2025) project commenced in April 2011 to replace the westbound bridge. The westbound bridge opened in July 2013.

The westbound span temporarily carried both east and westbound traffic while the eastbound span was replaced. It opened to traffic in September 2014 with overall completion scheduled for the spring of 2015.

== Future ==
Future Interstate 42
- Location: Noble County – Arkansas state line
- Length: 174 mi (280 km)

More recently, the Greenwood District in Tulsa has called for the removal of the I-244 corridor which is seen as just as damaging to the community as the Tulsa race massacre. However, the segment is also part of the future I-42 corridor, making this unlikely.

== Exit list ==
The entire route is in Tulsa County.

Location	mi	km	Exit	Destinations	Notes
Sapulpa	0.0	0.0		I-44 west / SH-66 west – Sapulpa, Oklahoma City	Western terminus
Sapulpa	0.1	0.16	1A	I-44 east / SH-66 east – Joplin, St Louis	Westbound exit and eastbound entrance; exit 223A on I-44
Oakhurst	0.2	0.32	1B	51st Street	Westbound exit only
Tulsa	1.0	1.6	1C	33rd West Avenue	
Tulsa	1.9	3.1	1D	40th Place / Southwest Boulevard	
Tulsa	2.5	4.0	2	US 75 south – Glenpool, Okmulgee	Western end of US-75 concurrency; westbound exit and eastbound entrance
Tulsa	3.6	5.8	3A	Southwest Boulevard	No westbound exit
Tulsa	4.0	6.4	3B	23rd Street	Westbound exit and eastbound entrance
Tulsa	4.4	7.1	4A	17th Street / Southwest Boulevard	Westbound exit and eastbound entrance
Tulsa	4.7	7.6	4B	US 64 east / US 75 north / SH-51 east (I-444 east) – Broken Arrow, Bartlesville	Eastern end of US-75 concurrency; western end of US-64/SH-51 concurrency
Tulsa	4.9	7.9	4C	7th Street – Downtown Tulsa	Eastbound exit and westbound entrance
Tulsa	5.2	8.4	5A	2nd Street – Downtown Tulsa	Westbound exit and eastbound entrance
Tulsa	5.5– 5.6	8.9– 9.0	5	Future I-42 west / US 64 west / US 412 west / SH-51 west / L.L. Tisdale Parkway north – Sand Springs, Enid	Signed as exits 5B (west) and 5C (north); eastern end of US 64/SH-51 concurrency; western end of US 412 concurrency; southern terminus of L.L. Tisdale Parkway
Tulsa	6.2	10.0	6A	Cincinnati Avenue / Detroit Avenue	
Tulsa	6.6	10.6	6B	US 75 (I-444 west) – Bartlesville, Okmulgee	Exits 3B-C on US 75
Tulsa	7.1	11.4	6C	1st Street – Downtown Tulsa	Westbound exit and eastbound entrance
Tulsa	7.7	12.4	7	Utica Avenue / Lewis Avenue / Peoria Avenue	
Tulsa	8.7	14.0	8	Delaware Avenue / Lewis Avenue	
Tulsa	9.4	15.1	9	Harvard Avenue	Westbound exit and eastbound entrance
Tulsa	10.2	16.4	10	Yale Avenue	
Tulsa	11.3	18.2	11	Sheridan Road – Tulsa Zoo	
Tulsa	12.3	19.8	12A	Memorial Drive	
Tulsa	12.5	20.1	12B	SH-11 west (Gilcrease Expressway) – Tulsa International Airport	Eastern terminus of SH-11
Tulsa	13.0	20.9	13A	Mingo Road	Eastbound exit and westbound entrance
Tulsa	13.7	22.0	13	US 169 (Mingo Valley Expressway) – Owasso, Nowata	Signed as exits 13B (south) and 13C (north)
Tulsa	14.4	23.2	14	Garnett Road	
Tulsa	15.1	24.3	15	129th East Avenue	Eastbound exit and westbound entrance
Tulsa	15.7	25.3		Future I-42 east / I-44 east / US 412 east / SH-66 east – Joplin	Eastern terminus; eastern end of US 412 concurrency; exit 236B on I-44
1.000 mi = 1.609 km; 1.000 km = 0.621 mi: Concurrency terminus; Incomplete access
