= Pharoah, Oklahoma =

Pharoah
- Unincorporated community
- Location within the state of Oklahoma Pharoah (the United States)
- Coordinates: 35°25′13″N 96°07′23″W
- Country: United States
- State: Oklahoma
- County: Okfuskee
- Elevation: 768 ft (234 m)
- Time zone: UTC-6 (Central (CST))
  - Summer (DST): UTC-5 (CDT)
- GNIS feature ID: 1096590

Pharoah, originally spelled "Pharaoh," but incorrectly spelled by the Oklahoma Department of Transportation and other state entities and agencies, is an unincorporated community in Okfuskee County, Oklahoma, United States. It is nine miles east of Okemah just south of Interstate 40 on US Route 75. The community was named after a rancher and cattleman, O.J. Pharaoh. Oil and gas production have historically been important industries in Okfuskee County, and, in the 1920s, oil wells were drilled around Pharoah. A post office opened in Pharoah on June 8, 1921; the current nearest post office is in Weleetka.
