= Oakhurst, Oklahoma =

- Census-designated place
- Post Office at Oakhurst, September of 2026

- Location within Creek County, and the state of Oklahoma
- Coordinates: 36°4′45″N 96°3′5″W
- Country: United States
- State: Oklahoma
- Counties: Tulsa, Creek

Area
  - Total: 5.54 sq mi (14.34 km^{2})
  - Land: 5.54 sq mi (14.34 km^{2})
  - Water: 0.0039 sq mi (0.01 km^{2})
- Elevation: 768 ft (234 m)

Population (2020)
  - Total: 2,262
  - Density: 408.6/sq mi (157.77/km^{2})
- Time zone: UTC-6 (Central (CST))
  - Summer (DST): UTC-5 (CDT)
- ZIP code: 74050
- Area codes: 539/918
- FIPS code: 40-53350
- GNIS feature ID: 1096147

Oakhurst is an unincorporated community and census-designated place (CDP) in Creek and Tulsa counties in the U.S. state of Oklahoma. The population was 2,262 at the 2020 census, a slight increase from the 2010 population of 2,185.

== Geography ==
Oakhurst is located in western Tulsa County and northeastern Creek County at 36°4′45″N 96°3′5″W (36.079291, -96.051444). It is bordered by Tulsa to the east, Sand Springs to the northwest, and Sapulpa to the south. Interstate 44 passes through the community, with access from exits 221 and 222. Downtown Tulsa is 7 miles (11 km) to the northeast via Interstate 244, which branches from I-44 in northeast Oakhurst.

According to the United States Census Bureau, the CDP has a total area of 5.7 square miles (14.7 km^{2}), all land. The CDP has lost area over time as the surrounding cities expand; in 2000 the area of Oakhurst was 6.7 square miles (17.4 km^{2}).

== History ==
Oakhurst was established in 1918.

== Demographics ==
Historical population
| Census | Pop. | Note | %± |
|---|---|---|---|
| 2000 | 2,731 | | — |
| 2010 | 2,185 | | −20.0% |
| 2020 | 2,262 | | 3.5% |
U.S. Decennial Census

=== 2020 census ===
As of the 2020 census, Oakhurst had a population of 2,262. The median age was 42.3 years. 20.8% of residents were under the age of 18 and 18.5% of residents were 65 years of age or older. For every 100 females there were 105.8 males, and for every 100 females age 18 and over there were 110.8 males age 18 and over.

84.5% of residents lived in urban areas, while 15.5% lived in rural areas.

There were 902 households in Oakhurst, of which 27.8% had children under the age of 18 living in them. Of all households, 49.6% were married-couple households, 21.5% were households with a male householder and no spouse or partner present, and 22.8% were households with a female householder and no spouse or partner present. About 27.4% of all households were made up of individuals and 11.7% had someone living alone who was 65 years of age or older.

There were 1,023 housing units, of which 11.8% were vacant. The homeowner vacancy rate was 1.2% and the rental vacancy rate was 7.5%.

Racial composition as of the 2020 census
| Race | Number | Percent |
|---|---|---|
| White | 1,568 | 69.3% |
| Black or African American | 20 | 0.9% |
| American Indian and Alaska Native | 234 | 10.3% |
| Asian | 10 | 0.4% |
| Native Hawaiian and Other Pacific Islander | 1 | 0.0% |
| Some other race | 84 | 3.7% |
| Two or more races | 345 | 15.3% |
| Hispanic or Latino (of any race) | 223 | 9.9% |

=== 2000 census ===
As of the census of 2000, there were 2,731 people, 1,067 households, and 767 families residing in the CDP. The population density was 406.8 inhabitants per square mile (157.1/km^{2}). There were 1,191 housing units at an average density of 177.4 per square mile (68.5/km^{2}). The racial makeup of the CDP was 81.03% White, 1.28% African American, 10.00% Native American, 0.55% Asian, 0.07% Pacific Islander, 0.73% from other races, and 6.33% from two or more races. Hispanic or Latino of any race were 2.49% of the population.

There were 1,067 households, out of which 28.2% had children under the age of 18 living with them, 55.9% were married couples living together, 10.4% had a female householder with no husband present, and 28.1% were non-families. 24.7% of all households were made up of individuals, and 9.0% had someone living alone who was 65 years of age or older. The average household size was 2.56 and the average family size was 3.04.

In the CDP, the population was spread out, with 24.6% under the age of 18, 7.8% from 18 to 24, 28.2% from 25 to 44, 26.4% from 45 to 64, and 12.9% who were 65 years of age or older. The median age was 38 years. For every 100 females, there were 97.8 males. For every 100 females age 18 and over, there were 97.5 males.

The median income for a household in the CDP was $34,858, and the median income for a family was $41,104. Males had a median income of $30,227 versus $20,453 for females. The per capita income for the CDP was $15,125. About 6.7% of families and 8.9% of the population were below the poverty line, including 3.9% of those under age 18 and 4.6% of those age 65 or over.

== Education ==
The portion in Tulsa County is mostly in the Tulsa Public Schools school district, with a portion in the Berryhill Public Schools school district.

The portion in Creek County is divided between Tulsa Public Schools and the Sapulpa Public Schools school district.
