= Downtown Tulsa =

Human settlement in Tulsa, Oklahoma, United States

Downtown Tulsa is an area of approximately 1.4 square miles (3.6 km^{2}) surrounded by an inner-dispersal loop (IDL) created by Interstate 244, US 64, US 75, Highway 51, and US 412. The area serves as Tulsa's financial and business district; it is the focus of a large initiative to draw tourism, which includes plans to capitalize on the area's historic architecture. Much of Tulsa's convention space is located in downtown, such as the Tulsa Performing Arts Center and the Arvest Convention Center, as well as the BOK Center. Prominent downtown sub-districts include the Blue Dome District, the Tulsa Arts District, and the Greenwood Historical District, which includes the site of ONEOK Field, a baseball stadium for the Tulsa Drillers opened in 2010. The Tulsa World and This Land Press have their headquarters in Downtown Tulsa.

In 2010, the estimated population of downtown is 4,000. The daytime population is estimated to be 36,000.

== Downtown districts ==
Tulsa includes many structures built during the Oil Boom in the 1920s and 1930s, including Art Deco buildings such as the Mid-Continent Tower, Boston Avenue Methodist Church, and the Exchange Bank Building (today known as the 320 South Boston Building). Oilman Waite Phillips left a significant architectural impact on downtown Tulsa through the Philtower and Philcade buildings. Other notable Tulsa buildings include the Atlas Life Building, Holy Family Cathedral, Holy Trinity Greek Orthodox Church, and the Mayo Hotel, the former of which once served as home to J. Paul Getty. Known for a time as "Terra Cotta City", Tulsa hosted the International Sixth Congress on Art Deco in 2001.

Downtown Tulsa is in the northwest quadrant of the city and is ringed by an expressway system called the inner dispersal loop. Downtown's buildings include many large office towers. At 667 ft (203 m), the BOK Tower (formerly One Williams Center) was the tallest building in any of the 5 "plains states" (Oklahoma, Kansas, Nebraska, North Dakota and South Dakota) until the Devon Tower in Oklahoma City was completed in 2012. The BOK Tower was designed in 1975 by Minoru Yamasaki & Associates, the same architect who designed the World Trade Center in New York City.

The Tulsa Performing Arts Center occupies a half city block in Tulsa's historical downtown. The PAC is also the design of Minoru Yamasaki. It houses five theatres and a reception hall. More than a quarter of a million people visit the Center each year to attend a performance from one of Tulsa's seven acclaimed musical and dramatic companies including the Tulsa Ballet, Tulsa Symphony Orchestra, Tulsa Opera, and a variety of symphonic groups. The PAC hosts a multitude of cultural events through the fall, winter and spring.

In 2005 the City of Tulsa broke ground on a 19,199 seat regional events center designed by architect César Pelli. The arena was named the BOK Center (or Bank of Oklahoma Center) and opened on August 30, 2008.

=== Blue Dome District ===
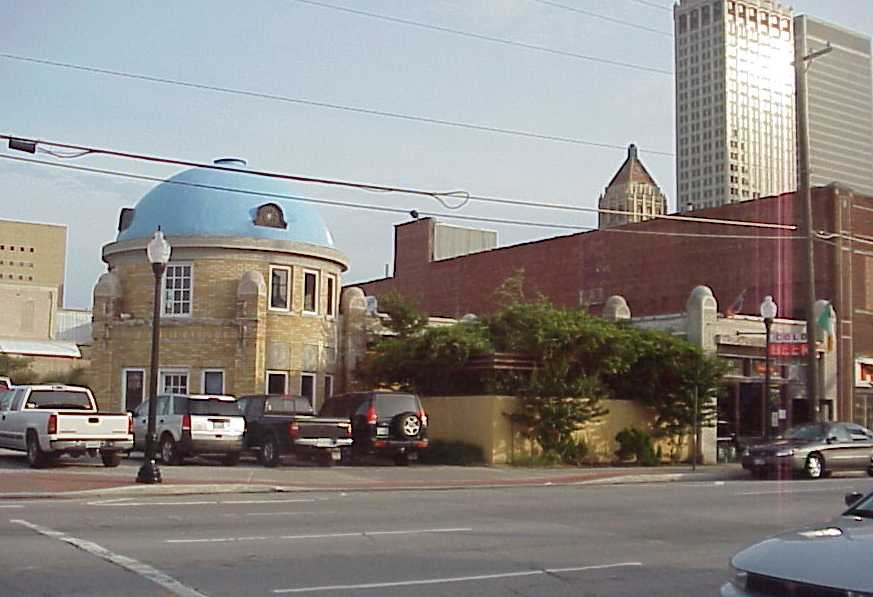
The Blue Dome, a former Gulf Oil Service Station, built in 1924.

The Blue Dome District, named for a distinctive, domed building at Second Street and Elgin Avenue, in the area in the eastern section of downtown. The building was originally constructed in 1924 as a Gulf Oil service by station. It has been converted to an information desk/office for the district, and is about two blocks south of the OneOK field.

=== Art Deco District ===
Tulsa boasts one of the nation’s most extensive collections of art deco architecture, which is most visible in the downtown Deco District. This region spans the area from 1st to 8th street, with borders at Boston and Cheyenne. This area is located in the heart of the skyscrapers of Downtown Tulsa and thus has many food, beverage, and fitness options readily available.

Buildings associated with Tulsa’s Deco District include the Philtower, Philcade, Atlas Life, Tulsa Club, and Public Service Company of Oklahoma buildings. Architectural tours of downtown are available, and the district includes underground pedestrian tunnels, some of which are accessible on guided tours. Tulsa International Mayfest, an annual arts and music festival, has also been held in the downtown area.

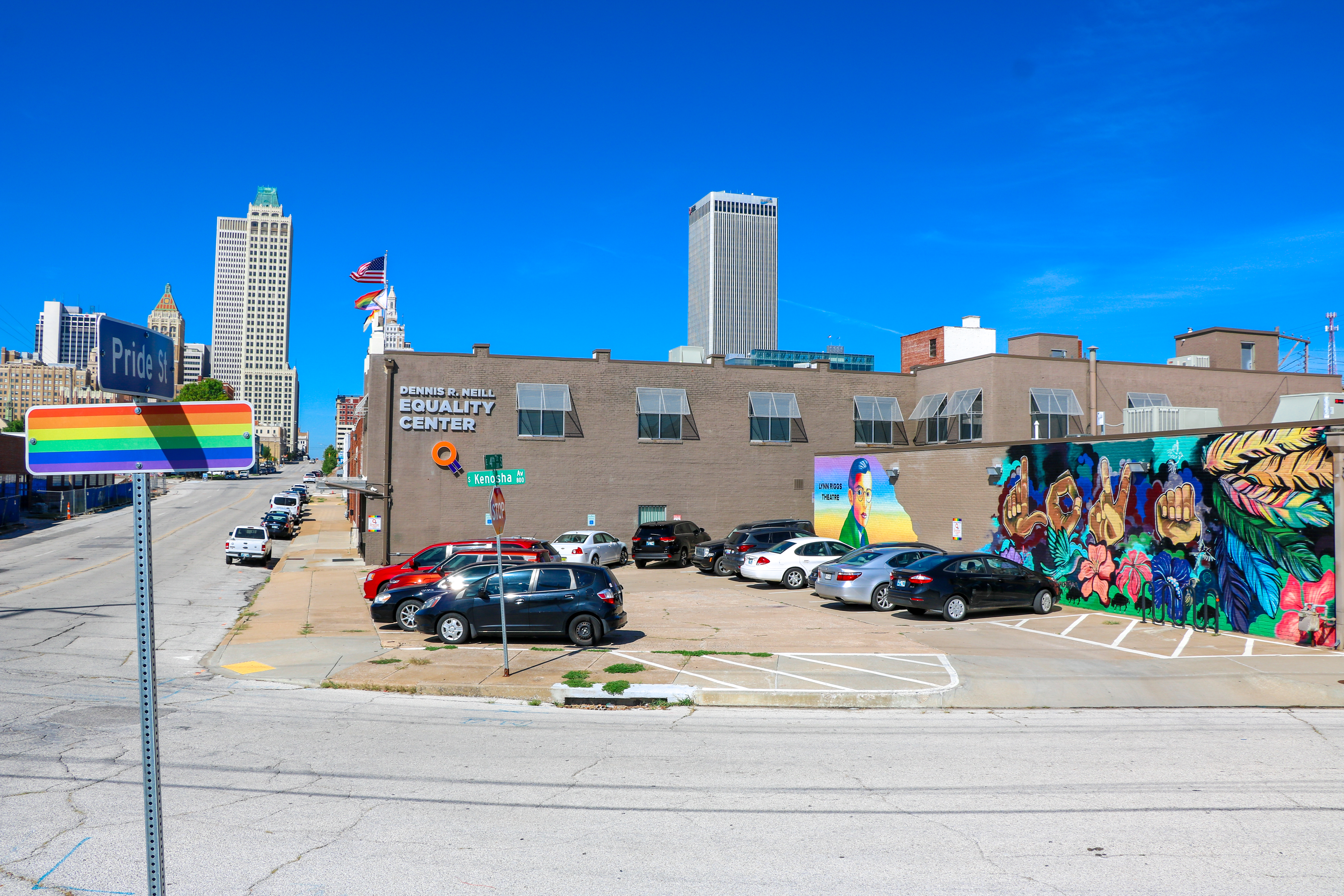
The Dennis R. Neill Equality Center in 2020.

=== East Village ===
East Village comprises 115 acres bordered by East 2nd and East 7th Streets, Detroit Avenue and Lansing Avenue, just inside the inner-dispersal loop. This area boasts an upscale martini bar, a hair salon, a pet day care, photography studios, lofts, a knitting room and living arts district, among others. The cornerstone of this neighborhood is the fifth largest LGBT community center in the United States, the Dennis R. Neill Equality Center, owned and operated by Oklahomans for Equality/OkEq (formerly Tulsa Oklahomans for Human Rights/TOHR), with further development being planned for more restaurants, residential lofts and retail. Oklahomans for Equality has hosted Tulsa Pride on the first weekend of June each year since 1982.

The development in the East Village has provided Tulsans and visitors with many food and entertainment opportunities. With areas like the Bond Center for large events intertwined with luxurious apartment complexes, the feeling of community is particularly strong within this area. There is a shopping complex made from repurposed shipping containers known as The Boxyard. The annual MOJO music fest occurs in this region, mixing live music with local craft beers and food trucks.

=== Greenwood Historical District ===
The Greenwood Historical District is just north of downtown and east of the Tulsa Arts District. It was once one of the most affluent African-American communities in the United States and referred to as Black Wall Street. In 1921, thirty-five blocks of businesses and residences were burned in this district during the infamous Tulsa Race Massacre. The Oklahoma Legislature passed laws in 2001 aimed at revitalizing Greenwood, setting up a scholarship fund for college-bound descendants of riot victims and appropriating $2 million for a riot memorial. As of 2004, two blocks of the old neighborhood have been restored and are part of the Greenwood Historical District. It is now home to the Greenwood Cultural Center, the Tulsa Race Riot Memorial, and the Oklahoma Jazz Hall of Fame, as well as Oklahoma State University-Tulsa and Langston University.

The John Hope Franklin Reconciliation Park details the relationship between African-Americans and the state of Oklahoma throughout history with an emphasis on the Tulsa Race Riot. The Mabel B. Little Heritage House takes visitors back to the 1920s with its classic furnishings and information about the Riots. The Greenwood Cultural Center strives to educate on the unique history of the Greenwood District, with a focus on jazz and the blues as well. Alongside these important landmarks in the Greenwood District lies a growing retail district bordering OneOK Field on the east.

=== Tulsa Arts District ===
Formerly known as the Brady Arts District, the Tulsa Art District is located north across the Santa Fe Railroad tracks from the central business district and centered at Main Street & Reconciliation Way. The Tulsa Arts District is one of Tulsa's oldest areas, characterized by two-story brick warehouses.

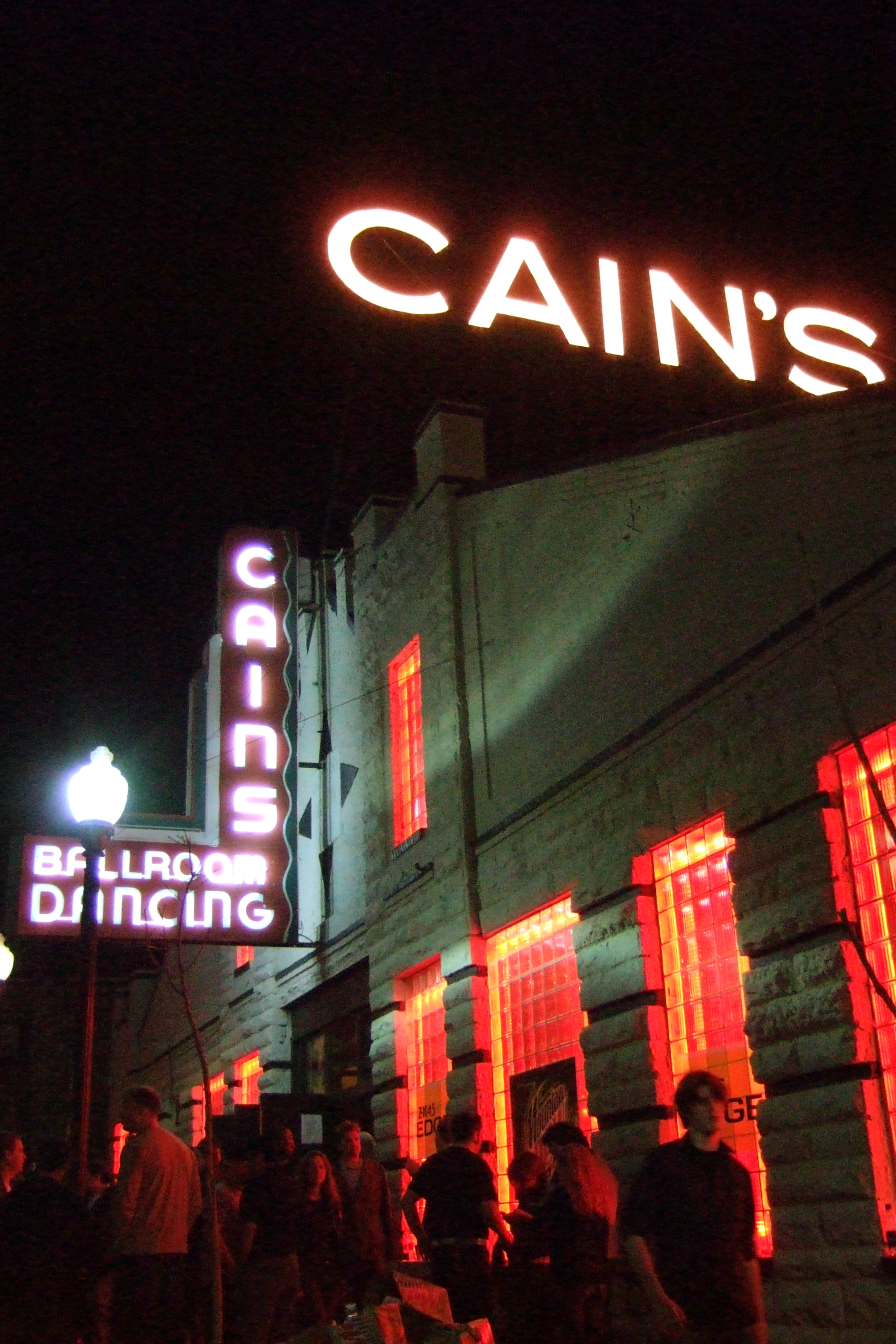
Cain's Ballroom

The Tulsa Theater, built between 1912 and 1914, was originally designed to serve as the city's municipal auditorium and was simply called "Convention Hall" for the first forty years of its life and was one of three internment camps where African Americans were detained after the 1921 Tulsa Race Riot. In 1952, major additions were added and the building was renamed Tulsa Municipal Theater. The building was listed on the National Register of Historic Places in 1979. Supplanted as the city auditorium in 1979 by construction of the Performing Arts Center in downtown, it continues to be used today for a wide variety of concerts and theatrical productions.

North of the theater on Main Street is the Cain's Ballroom, formerly the garage of the Brady family and the home of Bob Wills and his band, the Texas Playboys. The district is also the location of many local artists' galleries, restaurants with late night hours, bars and dance clubs. It is also an emerging gay neighborhood, with several gay or gay-friendly bars and numerous supportive shops and restaurants.

A few blocks southeast of Cain's Ballroom is Guthrie Green. This urban park is a cross between a garden and an amphitheater with events ranging from movie nights to workout classes hosted there. With family friendly concerts, food truck Wednesdays, and a splash pad, the Guthrie Green has become a central point for the Tulsa Arts District. In fact, on the first Friday of every month, local businesses in this area center their First Friday Art Crawl around the Green, with exhibits at Philbrook Downtown, 108 Contemporary, and the Hardesty Arts Center (AHHA).

Today, the Tulsa Arts District is one of the most diverse areas in all of Tulsa. It hosts restaurants, clubs, museums, and businesses. There is presently construction which will more than double the number of permanent residents in this artistic enclave.

== Gallery ==
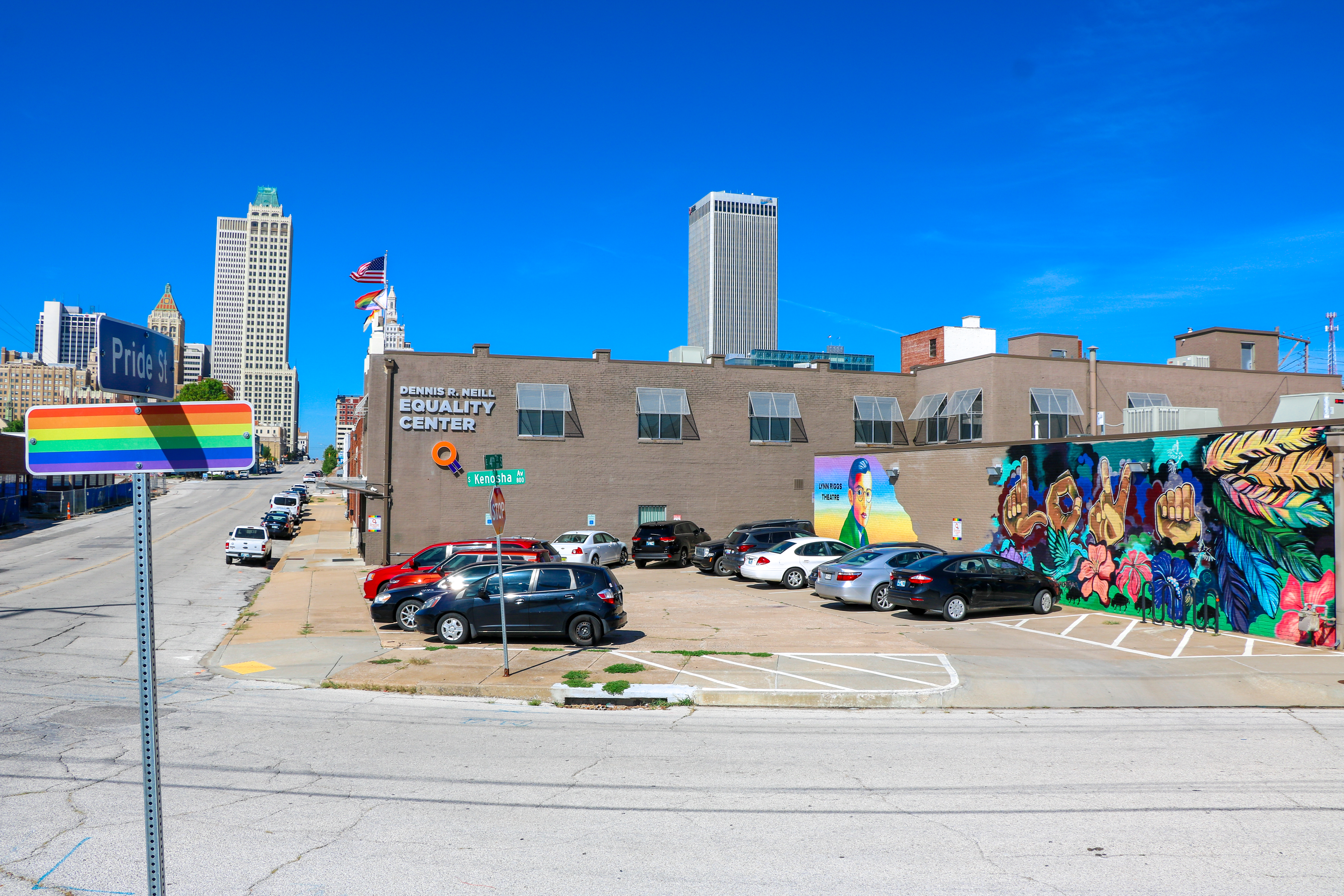
Oklahomans for Equality, 4th & Pride Street
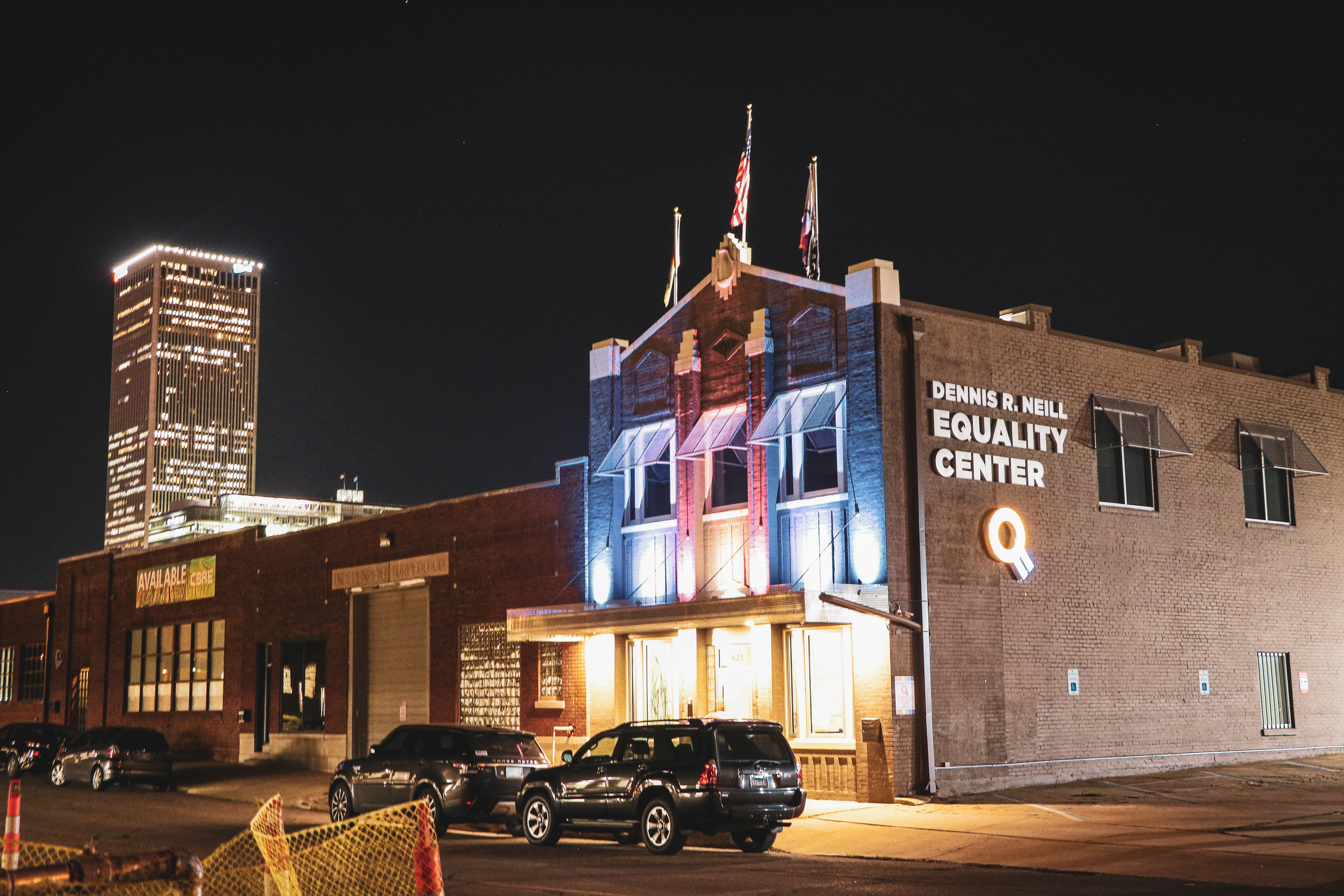
The Dennis R. Neill Equality Center in the East Village District in Downtown Tulsa/Tvlse, Creek Nation-Oklahoma

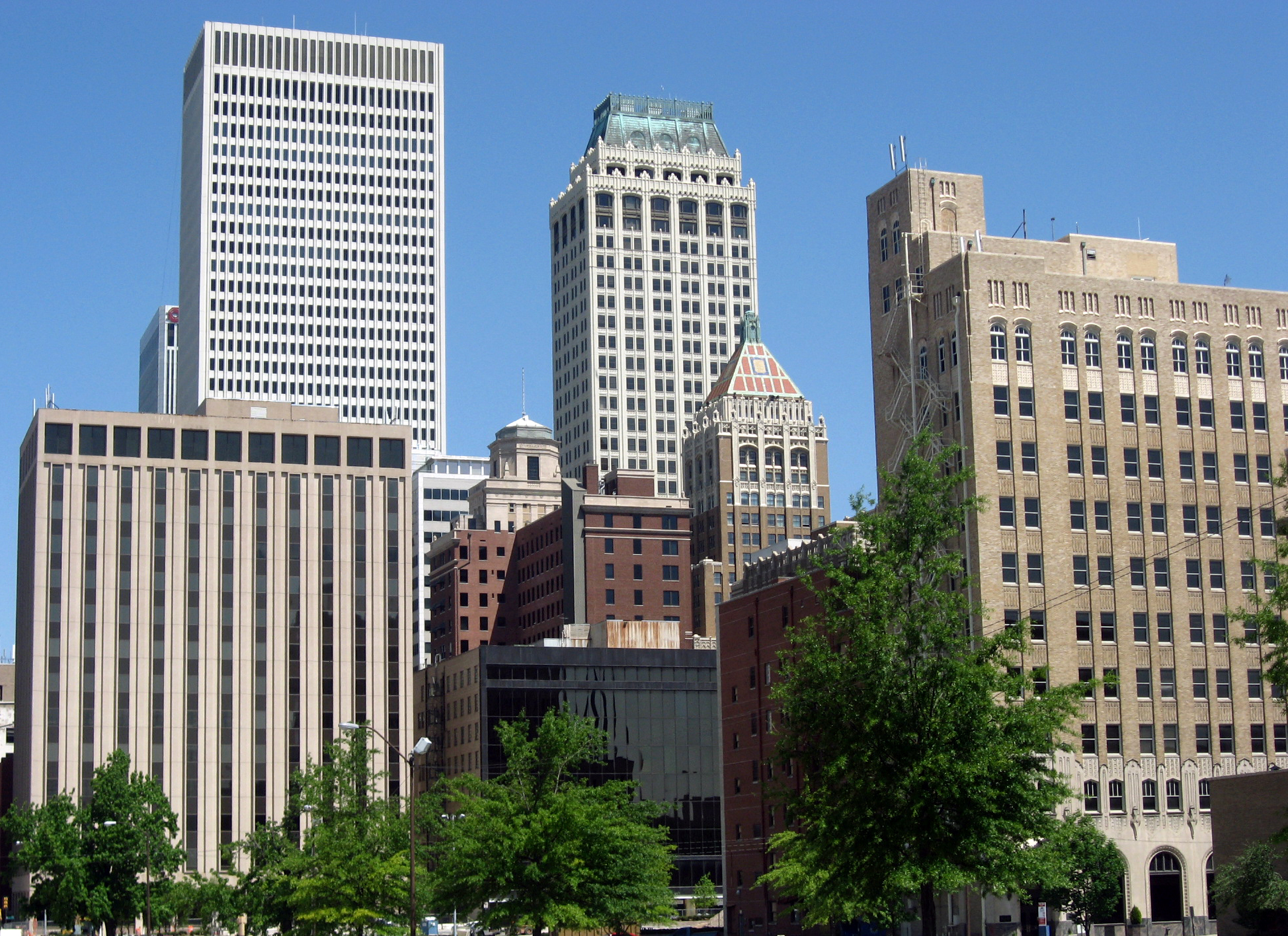
Downtown Tulsa

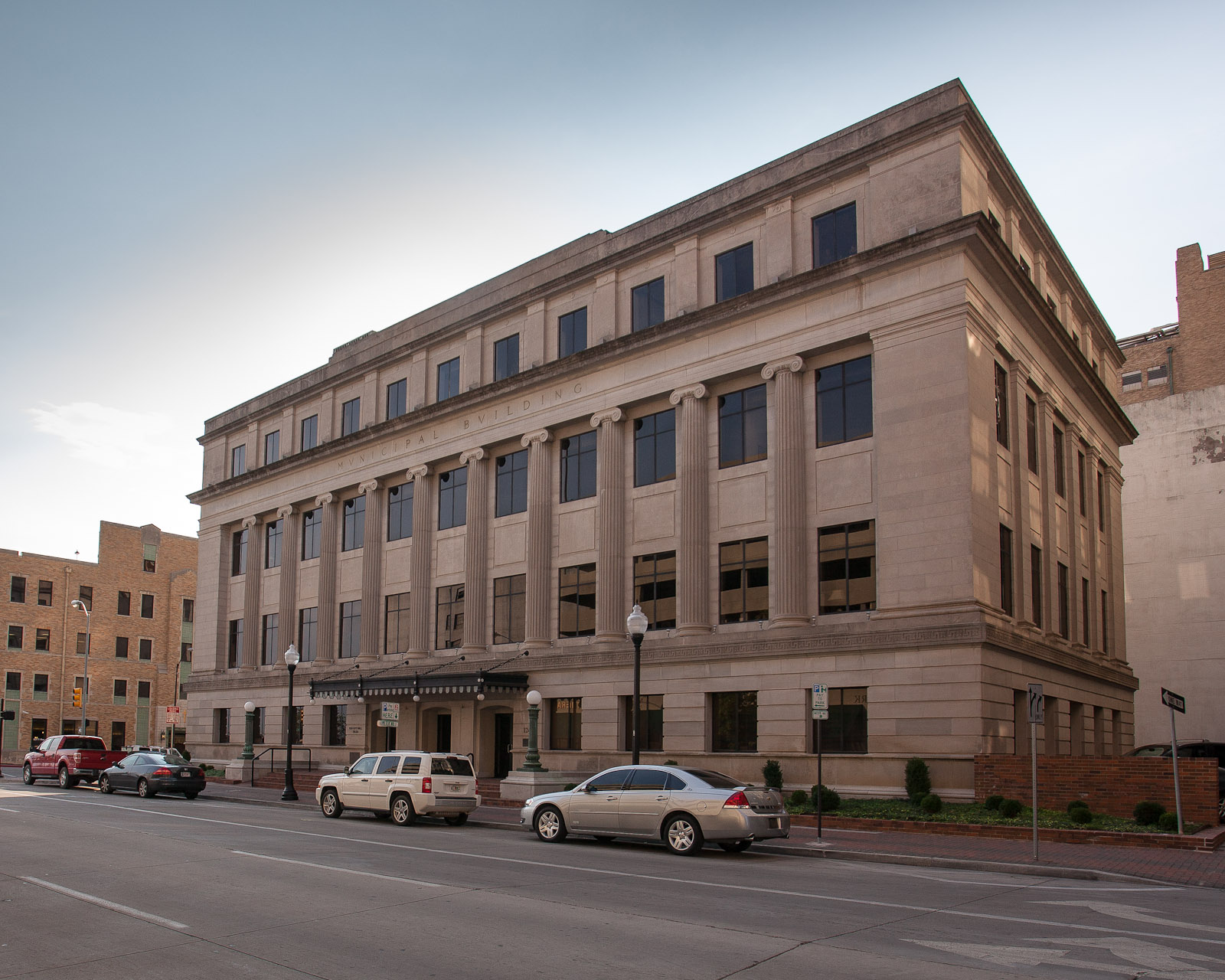
Tulsa Municipal Building

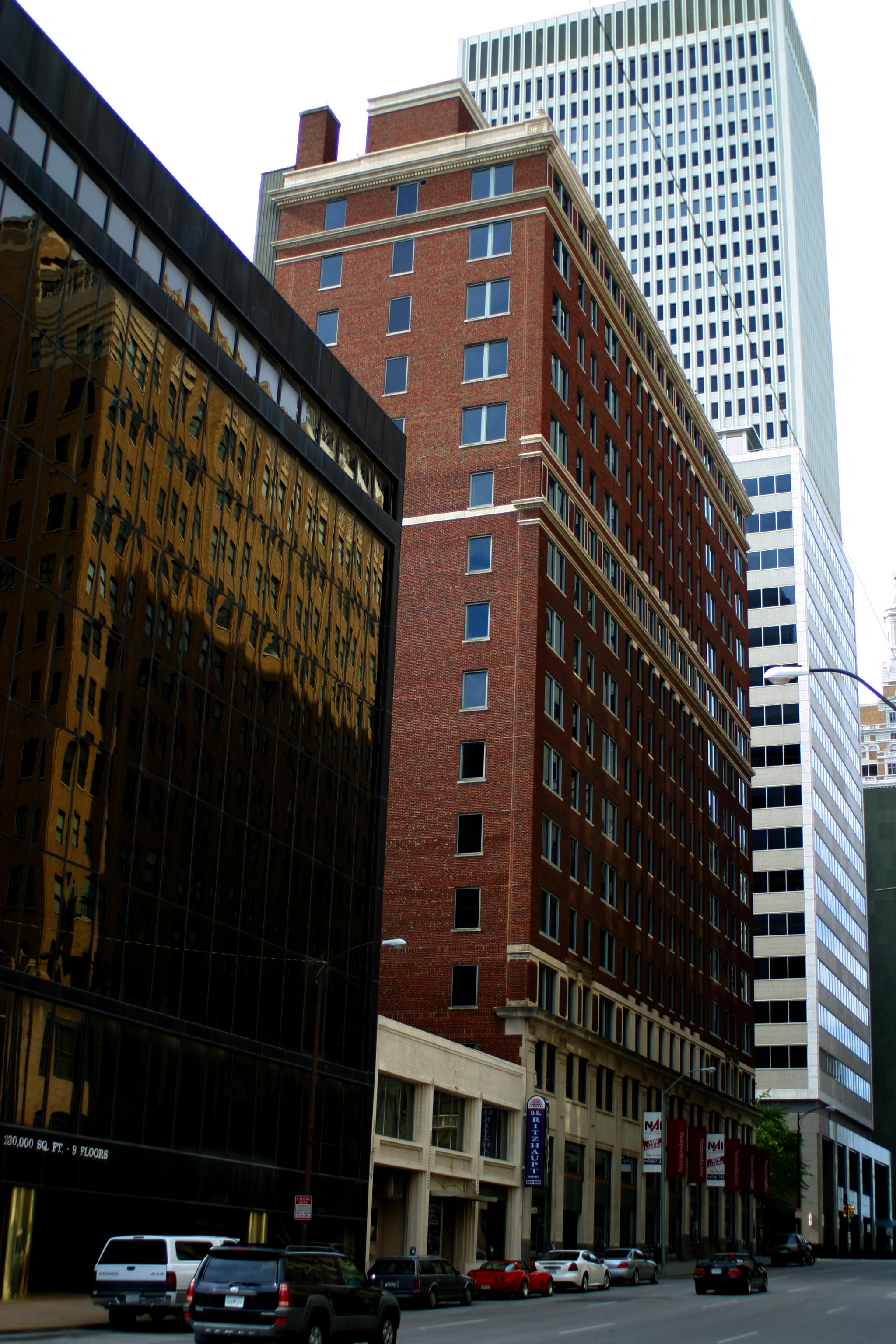
Looking North along Boston Avenue from 6th Street

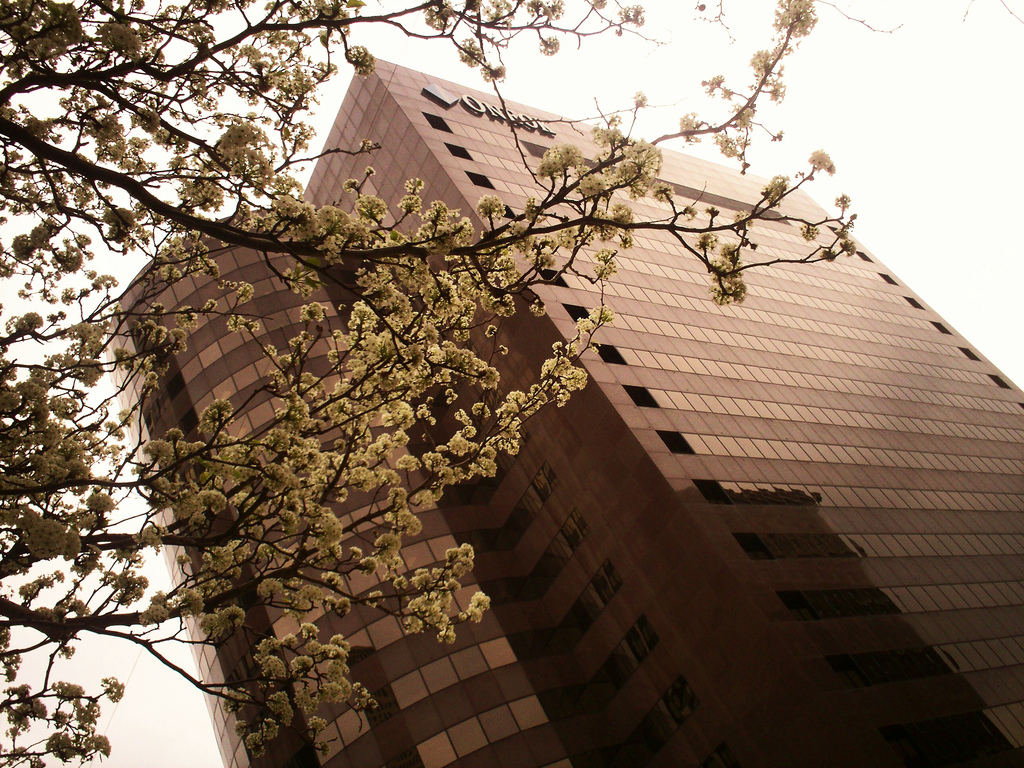
ONEOK

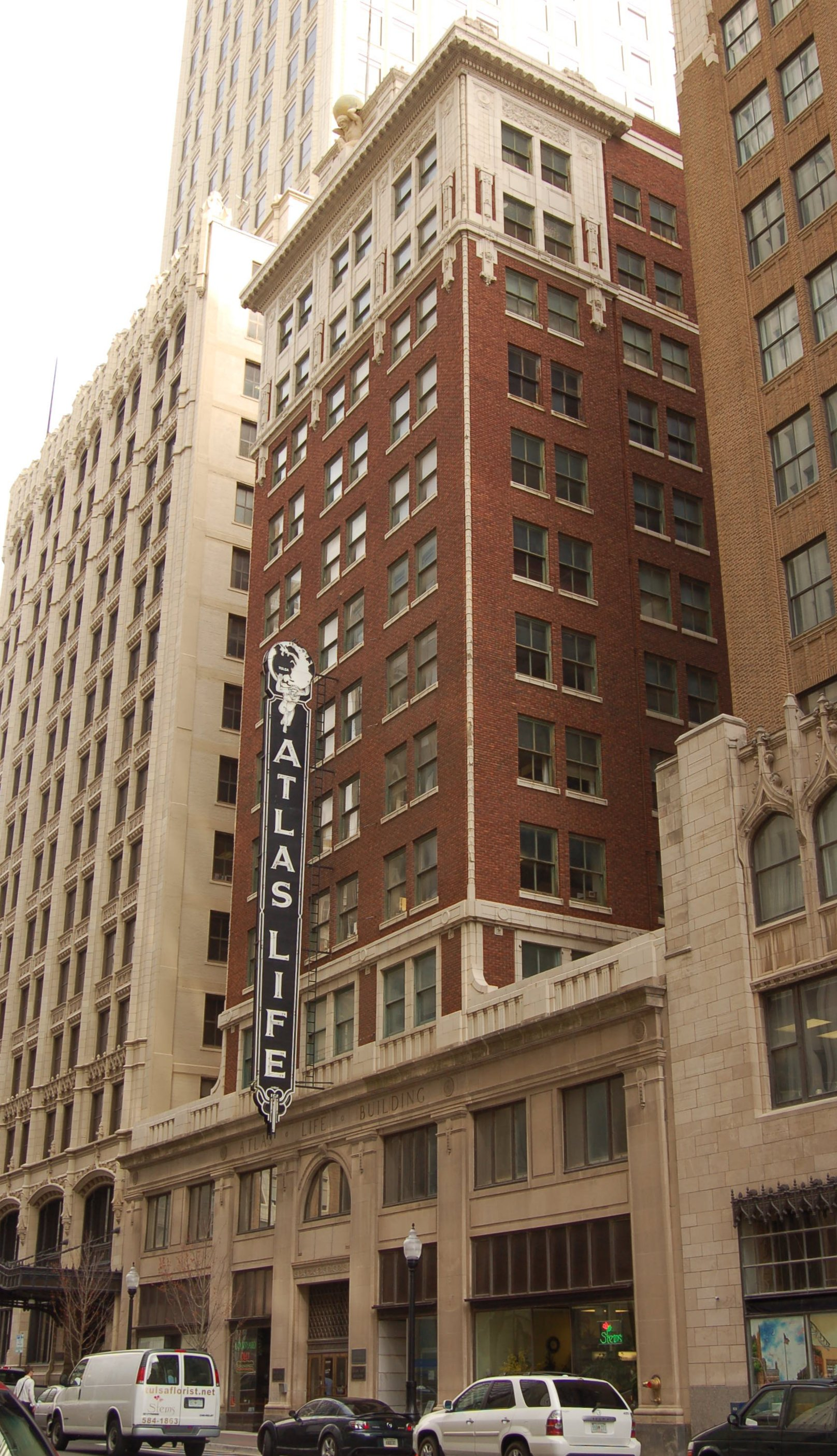
Atlas Life

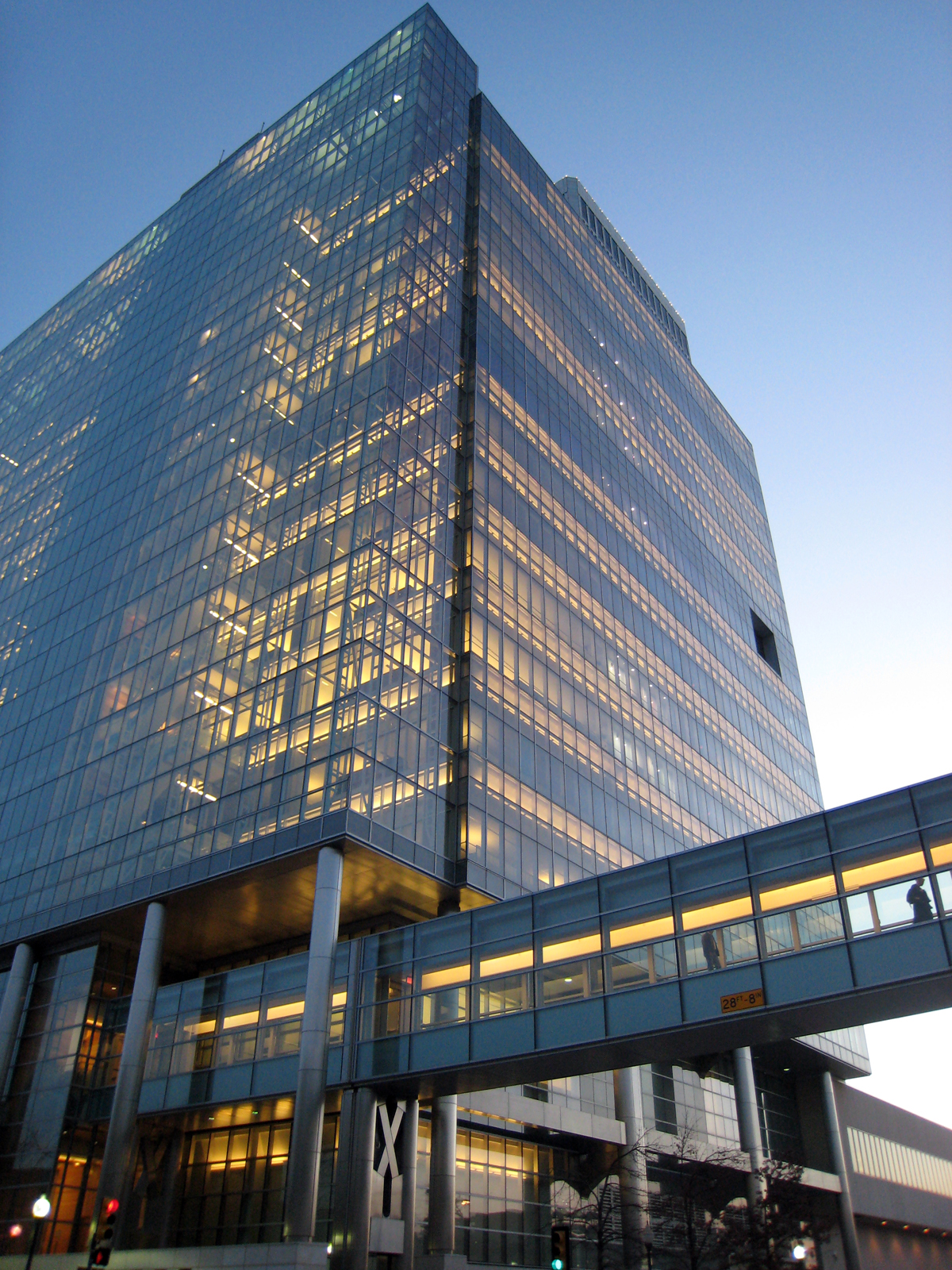
Williams Technology Center

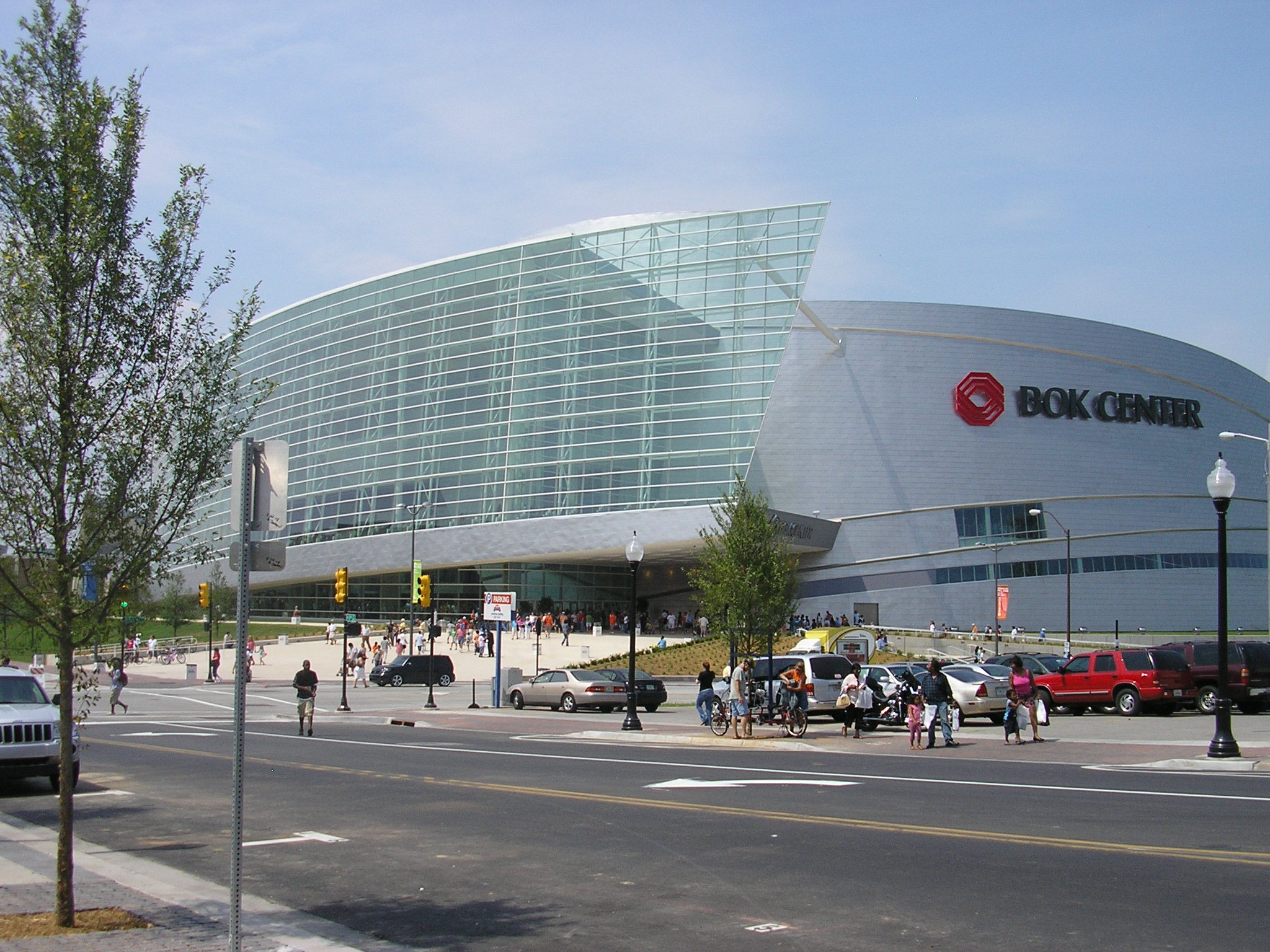
BOK Center

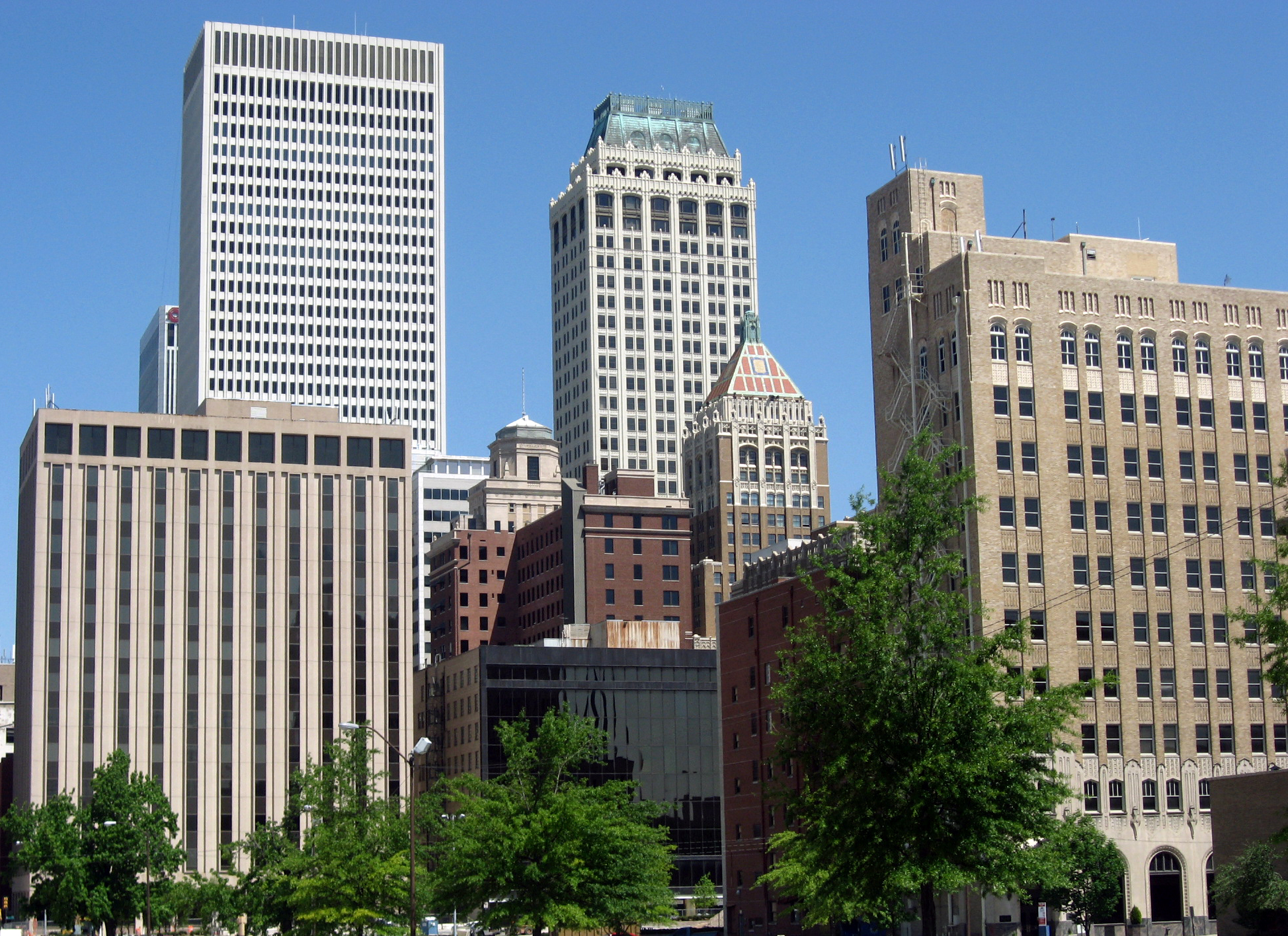
Downtown buildings

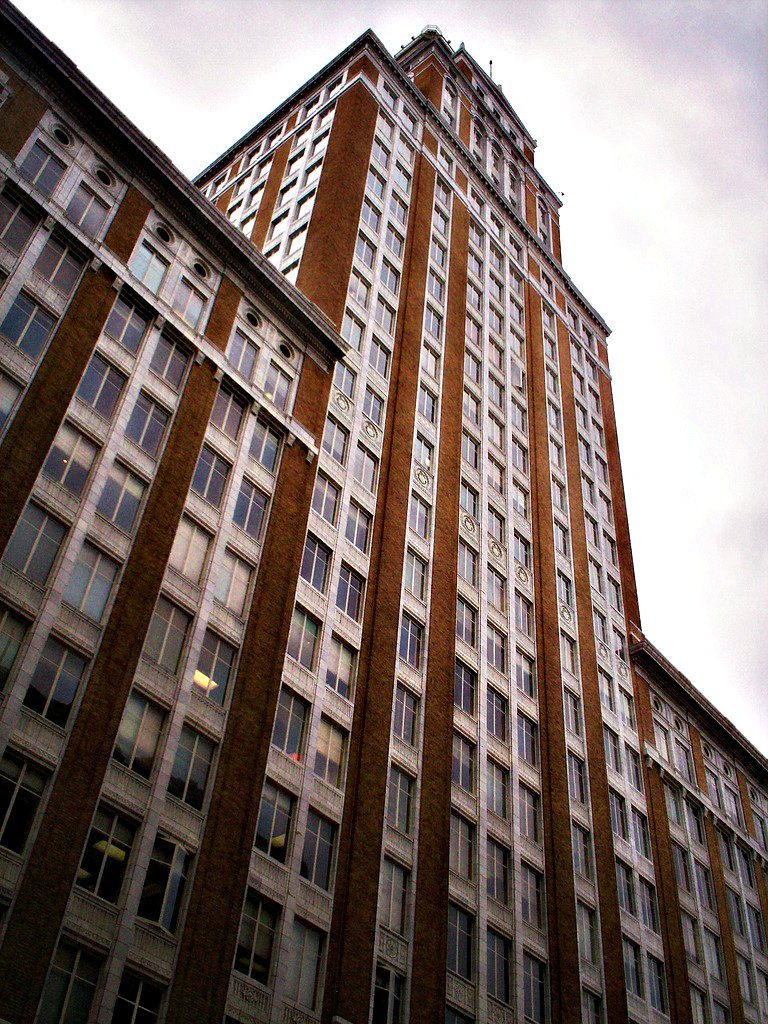
320 S. Boston Building

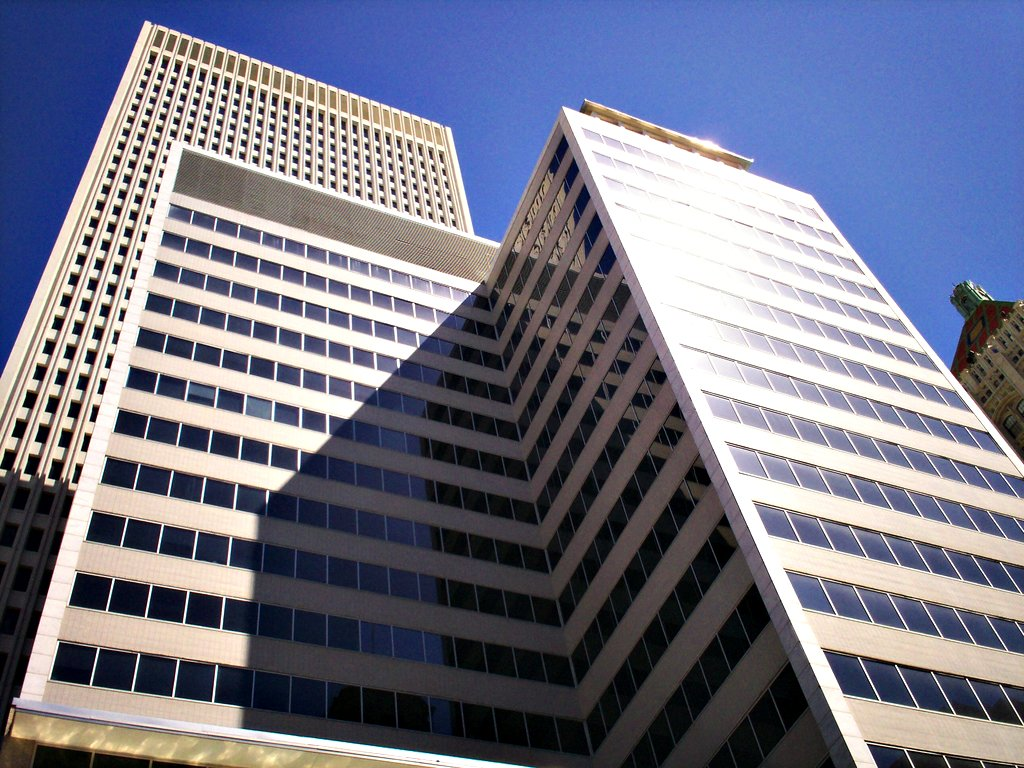
First National Bank Building and First Place Tower

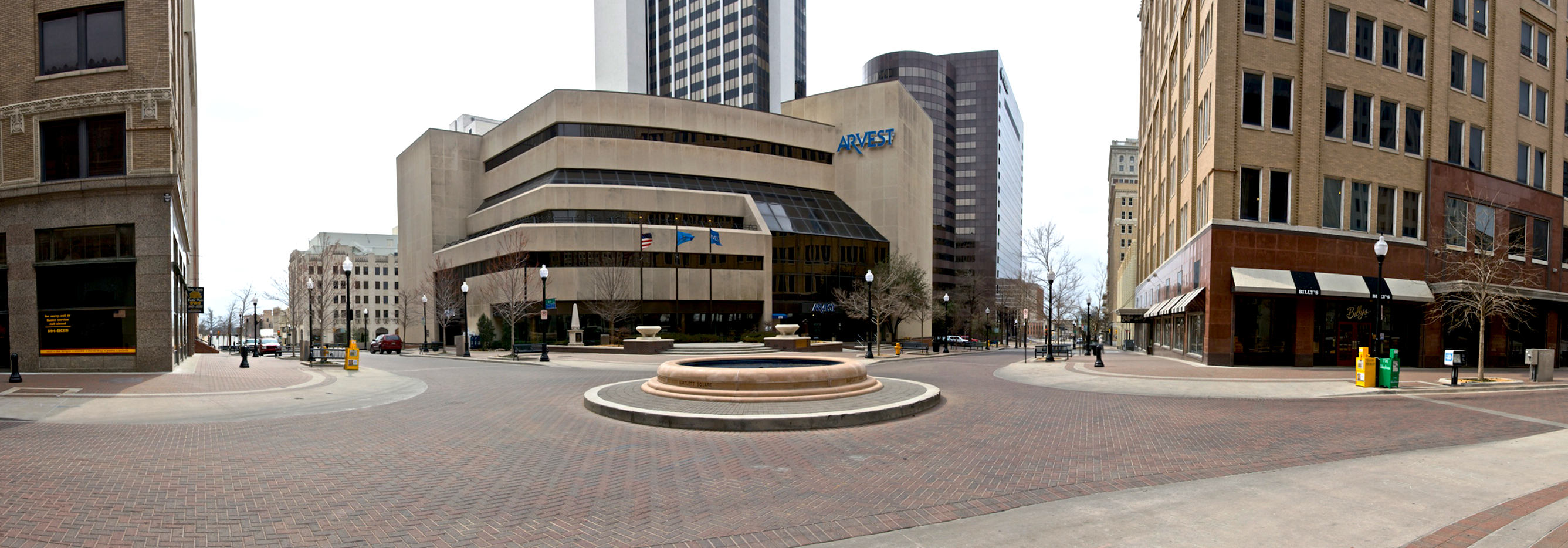
Bartlett Square at 5th and Main

== See also ==
- Tulsa
- List of companies based in Tulsa, Oklahoma
