= U.S. Route 412 in Oklahoma =

Highway in Oklahoma

U.S. Highway 412
- US 412 highlighted in red

Route information
- Maintained by ODOT and OTA
- Length: 504.11 mi (811.29 km)
- Existed: February 1, 1988–present

Major junctions
- West end: US 56 / US 64 / US 412 at the New Mexico state line near Clayton, NM
- US 54 in Guymon; I-35 / US 64 near Perry; I-44 Toll / Will Rogers Turnpike / Creek Turnpike in Fair Oaks; US 69 in Chouteau
- East end: Future I-42 / US 412 at the Arkansas state line in West Siloam Springs

Location
- Country: United States
- State: Oklahoma
- Counties: Cimarron, Texas, Beaver, Harper, Ellis, Woodward, Major, Garfield, Noble, Payne, Pawnee, Osage, Tulsa, Rogers, Mayes, Delaware

Highway system
- United States Numbered Highway System; List; Special; Divided; Oklahoma State Highway System; Interstate; US; State; Turnpikes
← US 385	→ I-444

U.S. Route 412 (US 412) is a U.S. highway in the south-central portion of the United States, connecting Springer, New Mexico to Columbia, Tennessee. A 504.11-mile (811.29 km) section of the highway crosses the state of Oklahoma, traversing the state from west to east. Entering the state southwest of Boise City, US 412 runs the length of the Oklahoma Panhandle and serves the northern portion of the state's main body, before leaving the state at West Siloam Springs. Along the way, the route serves many notable cities and towns including Boise City, Guymon, Woodward, Enid and the state's second-largest city, Tulsa.

US 412 has two tolled sections, both of them in Oklahoma—the Cimarron Turnpike and the Cherokee Turnpike. The tolled portions of the highway are operated by the Oklahoma Turnpike Authority (OTA), with the remainder of the route maintained by the Oklahoma Department of Transportation (ODOT). In addition to the freeway-grade turnpikes, a large amount of the highway has been upgraded to four-lane expressway facilities, although some portions remain two-lane, especially in the Panhandle. Much of US 412's route through Oklahoma either overlaps or is in close proximity to that of US 64.

US 412 was extended into Oklahoma in 1988 to encourage recreational travel and the resulting economic benefit to the state. This extension, in which the new designation replaced or overlapped several already existing highways, brought US 412's western terminus to Woodward. In 1993, it was extended west of Oklahoma, bringing it through the Panhandle and into New Mexico.

== Route description ==
=== The Panhandle ===
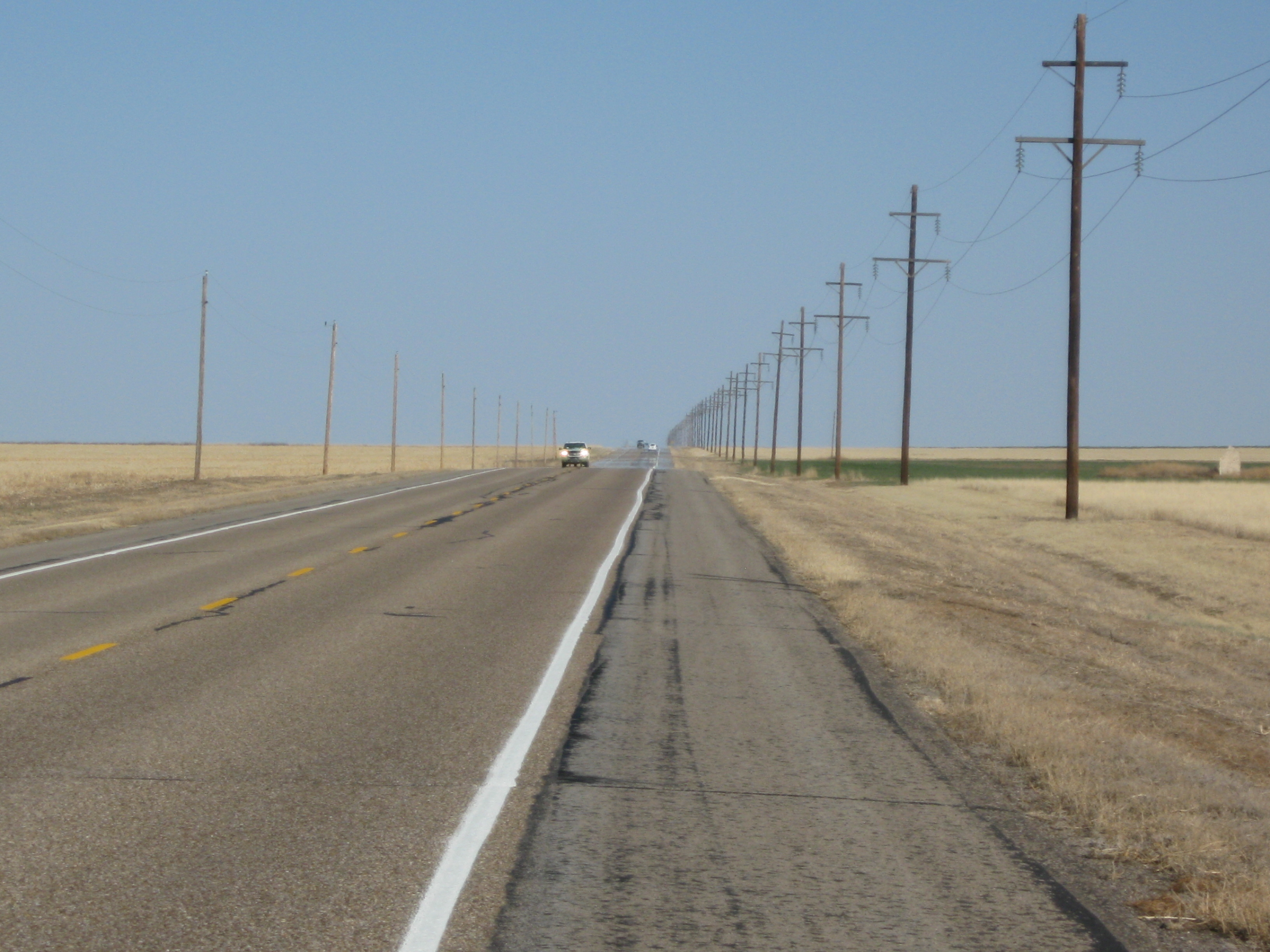
US 412 east of Boise City

U.S. Route 412 crosses the New Mexico–Oklahoma state line northeast of Clayton, New Mexico, concurrent with US 56 and US 64. The three highways enter the state just north of the extreme southwest corner of Cimarron County, the westernmost tip of the Oklahoma Panhandle. The highways head northeast, passing through disconnected parcels of the Rita Blanca National Grassland. The first town US 56, US 64 and US 412 encounter in Oklahoma is unincorporated Felt, which they skirt the northern edge of. The highways then cross the Beaver River before intersecting US 385, which joins the other three highways in a concurrency as they approach Boise City, the county seat. In Boise City, the highways reach a traffic circle which surrounds the Cimarron County Courthouse. At this traffic circle, US 56, US 64 and US 412 all turn east, while US 385 splits away to the north. State Highway 3 (SH-3) enters the circle from the north and leaves from the east, following US 412, while SH-325 begins at the circle and heads west toward Kenton. East of town, US 56/US 64/US 412/SH-3 have an interchange with US 287, which bypasses Boise City to the east. Six miles (9.7 km) northeast of here, US 56 splits away from the other highways; it continues northeast, while US 64/US 412/SH-3 turn onto a due east course. The routes intersect SH-171 eight miles (13 km) east of the split.

Approximately 12 miles (19 km) east of the SH-171 junction, US 64/US 412/SH-3 cross into Texas County. Seven miles (11 km) east of the county line, at unincorporated Four Corners, SH-95 joins the concurrency; it splits away after following the other three routes for five miles (8.0 km). The next major highway junction lies 18.1 miles (29.1 km) to the east, where SH-136 joins with US 64/US 412/SH-3 as the highways turn south toward Guymon. The four highways cross the Beaver River once again before entering that city, Texas County's seat and the largest city in the Panhandle. In Guymon, US 64 splits away to the east, while US 412 and State Highways 3 and 136 continue south, turning back east along US 54 to form a short concurrency. A US 412 truck route follows US 64 and US 54 around the east side of the city, reuniting with mainline US 412 where it splits away from SH-136. Just 217 feet (66 m) east of the US 54 junction, SH-136 splits away to the south, leaving US 412 and SH-3 to continue east. Southwest of Optima Lake, the two highways serve as the southern terminus of SH-94. East of the highway junction, US 412/SH-3 enter Optima National Wildlife Refuge, where they cross Coldwater Creek, one of the lake's tributaries. After leaving the refuge, the routes pass through the town of Hardesty. From Hardesty, the road continues due east, crossing Palo Duro Creek and Chiquita Creek, two tributaries of the Beaver River. The highways then leave Texas County.

The third county US 412 and SH-3 enter is Beaver County, the panhandle's easternmost county. The highways' route across Beaver County is arrow-straight, proceeding due east with only a single curve at the extreme east edge of the county. At the unincorporated location of Bryan's Corner, approximately 7 miles (11 km) east of the county line, the highway intersects US 83. Near the county's east–west midpoint, at Elmwood, US 412 and SH-3 intersect US 270 and SH-23. While SH-23 passes through the intersection north to south, eastbound US 270, following southbound SH-23 from Beaver, joins US 412/SH-3 heading east. The three highways continue on, passing through Slapout, before curving slightly to the north as they exit both Beaver County and the Oklahoma Panhandle.

=== Northwest Oklahoma ===
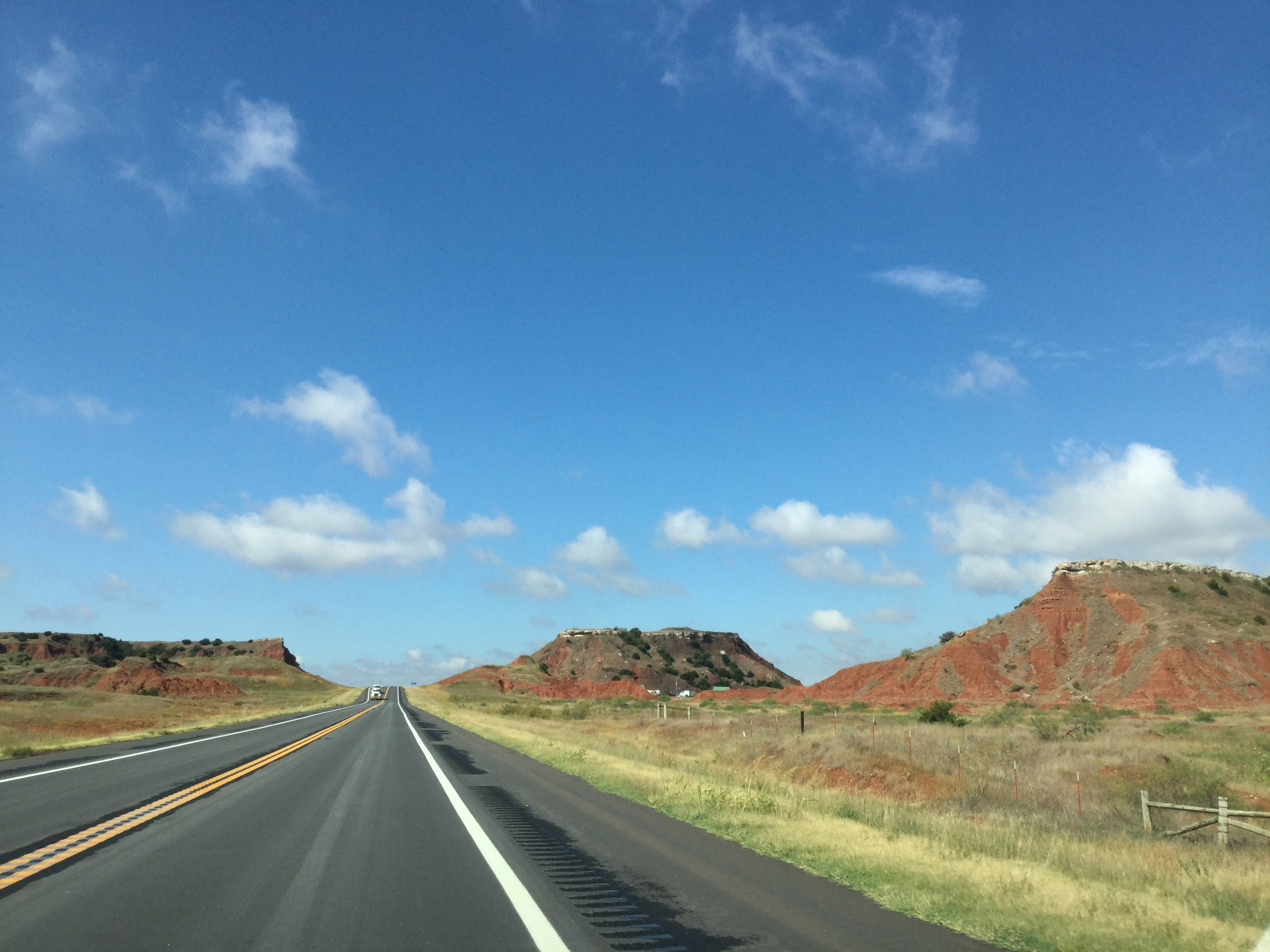
The Glass Mountains, found along US 412, are a major physical feature of Northwest Oklahoma.

Upon entering the main body of Oklahoma, the first county US 270/US 412/SH-3 pass through is Harper County. Here, they intersect US 283 south of Laverne; eight miles (13 km) east of US 283, in May, they intersect SH-46. US 270/US 412/SH-3 only cross the southwest part of Harper County before curving southeast into Ellis County. The routes, however, only clip the northeast corner of the county, traversing only 1.81 miles (2.91 km) of it before passing into Woodward County.

Shortly after entering Woodward County, US 270/US 412/SH-3 enter the town of Fort Supply. There, the routes junction with US 183, which joins the other routes as they make their way southeast. Thirteen miles (21 km) southeast of Fort Supply, the four highways enter the city of Woodward, the largest city within a nine-county area and the commercial hub of northwest Oklahoma. On the west edge of town, the four highways serve as the eastern terminus of the western segment of SH-15, a route made discontinuous by the establishment of US 412 (see history). US 270/US 183/US 412/SH-3 proceed east through Woodward. In downtown, they meet with SH-34; here, US 412 leaves the four-way concurrency, as it continues east by itself while the other three highways it has followed since Fort Supply turn south to overlap SH-34 instead. For the first time since its western terminus in New Mexico, where it began concurrent with US 56, US 412 is the sole highway designation on the road it follows.

As US 412 leaves town, it passes south of Boiling Springs State Park, running parallel to SH-34C and SH-50B, both of which serve the park. Along this stretch, it crosses the Beaver River for the third and final time, though this time it has since become the North Canadian River. SH-50 forms a concurrency with US 412 for 1.3 miles (2.1 km) before splitting off again in Mooreland. The highway passes just south of Curtis as it continues east out of Woodward County.

The next northwestern Oklahoma county that US 412 serves is Major County. The first intersection with another highway that US 412 comes to is with US 281 at Bouse Junction. East of here, US 412 skirts the northern edge of the Glass Mountains (also known as the Gloss Mountains), turning southeast before returning to a due east course. At Orienta, the highway begins a concurrency with US 60 and SH-8; the three highways turn north and together cross the Cimarron River. South of Cleo Springs, US 60 and US 412 turn east, while SH-8 splits away to the north. From here, it is a straight shot into Enid along US 60/US 412; there are no curves along the highway for over 33 miles (53 km). US 60 and US 412 continue to the east, meeting up with SH-58 on the north edge of Ringwood. The two US highways pass through Meno before coming to the Major–Garfield County line.

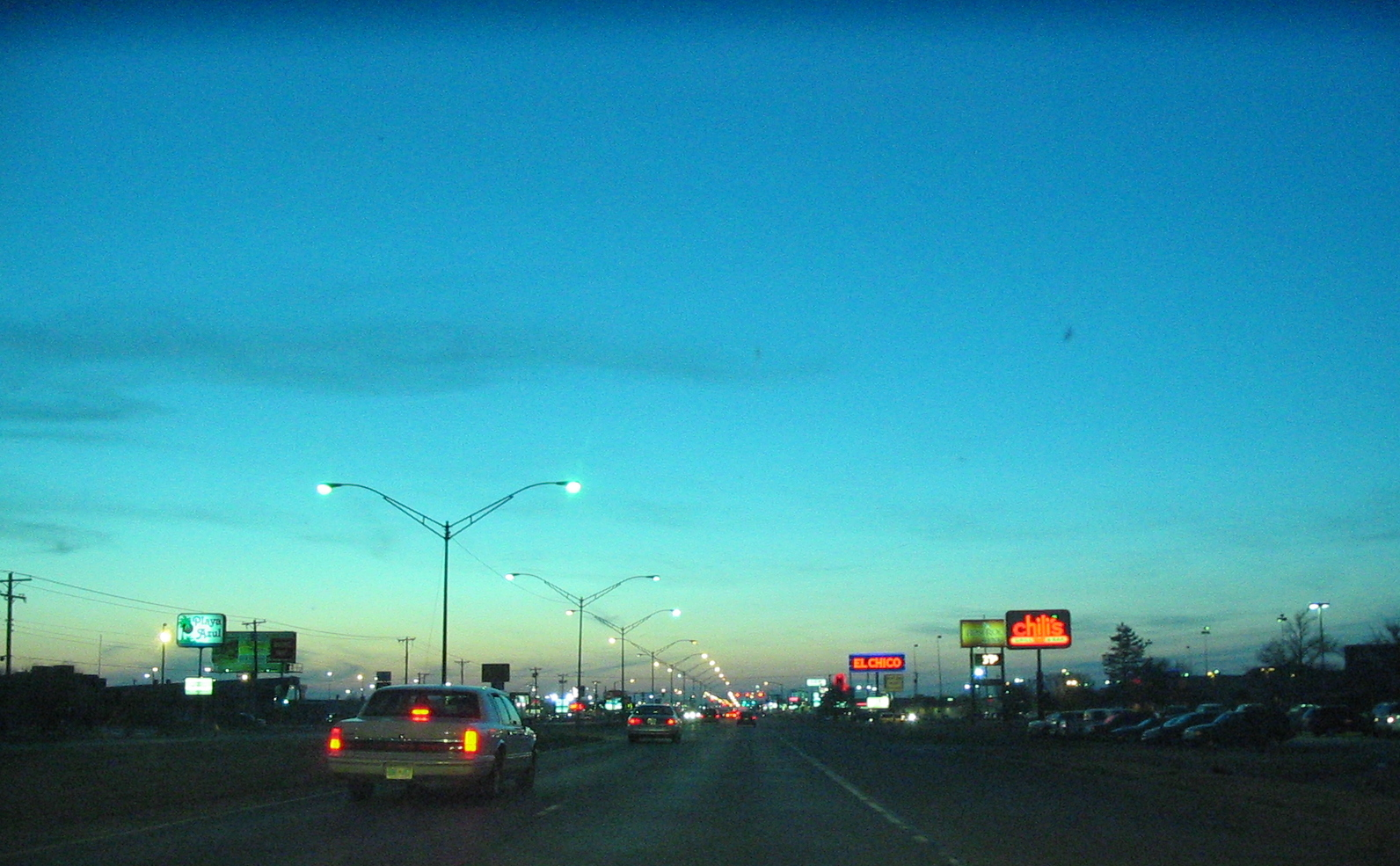
U.S. Route 412 (Owen K. Garriott) in Enid, Oklahoma

Soon after entering Garfield County, US 60/US 412 run through Lahoma. Three miles (4.8 km) east of there, they share a brief concurrency with SH-132. The two highways enter the county seat of Garfield County, the city of Enid, along Owen K. Garriott Road, named in honor of the astronaut. In downtown Enid, the routes intersect US 81; US 60 breaks away from US 412 to turn north along US 81, while US 412 continues east along Garriott Road. On the east side of Enid, US 412 reunites with US 64; the two form a concurrency as Garriott Road becomes an expressway heading east out of town. The next highway junction is an interchange with SH-74; this interchange also serves as the western terminus of the eastern segment of SH-15. From here, US 64/US 412 proceed due east into Noble County to a cloverleaf interchange with Interstate 35 (I-35). US 64 follows I-35 south toward Perry, while US 412 continues straight ahead, where it will form the Cimarron Turnpike.

=== Northeast Oklahoma ===
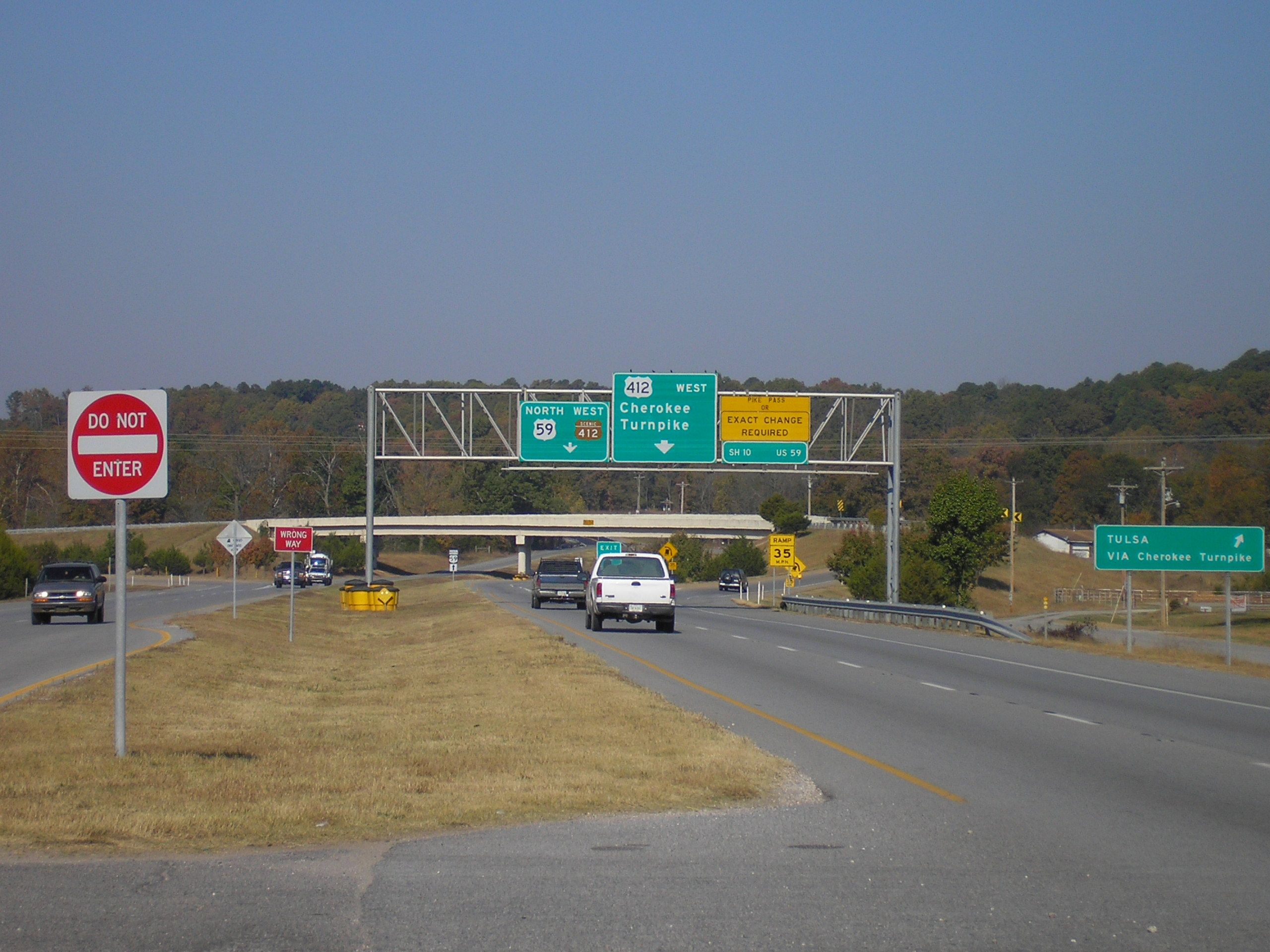
The beginning of the Cherokee Turnpike, headed westbound on US 412

The Cimarron Turnpike, carrying US 412, passes through Noble, Payne and Pawnee Counties. The highway heads east from I-35 to its first interchange, Exit 3, which provides access to US 77. The first mainline toll plaza is just west of Exit 15, a cloverleaf interchange with no straight-line ramps (forcing all traffic getting on or off to pass through the toll plaza) connecting the turnpike to US 177. East of the US 177 interchange, the highway curves to the south, crossing Black Bear Creek. US 412 then meets US 64 once again, interchanging with it at Exit 23 east of Morrison. The turnpike then turns back east, with a spur route (accessible only from the westbound turnpike) branching off to the southwest toward Stillwater. The Lone Chimney service plaza, a twenty-four-hour concession area, is located in the median of the turnpike east of the interchange with the spur. South of Pawnee lies an interchange (Exit 37) with SH-18. Just south of Hallett, a second mainline toll plaza sits just west of the SH-99 interchange; again, this interchange is a cloverleaf interchange with only loop ramps. The turnpike's final exit is Exit 60, a partial interchange with SH-48 southeast of Cleveland. The missing movements are provided by US 64, the northern terminus of SH-48, which merges with US 412 as the Cimarron Turnpike ends. The two routes continue east as a freeway.

The US 64/US 412 freeway, known locally as the Keystone Expressway, serves the western outlying areas of the Tulsa metropolitan area. Passing south of Westport, the freeway is routed along a peninsula in extreme southeastern Pawnee County, before crossing Keystone Lake, formed by the impounded Arkansas River, into far southern Osage County. US 64 and US 412 only traverse a short distance in the county, however; after 1.42 miles (2.29 km) the two routes pass into Tulsa County. Just south of the county line, the freeway has an interchange with SH-151, a short connector route that runs across Lake Keystone's dam. At this interchange the Keystone Expressway ends. The Sand Springs Expressway continues from here, through Sand Springs, where it includes an interchange with SH-97 and SH-51, the latter of which joins US 64/US 412 on the freeway. The three routes then continue east into Tulsa proper.

The Sand Springs Expressway comes to an end at the northwest corner of the Inner Disperal Loop (IDL), a ring of freeways surrounding Downtown Tulsa. At a stack interchange there, US 64 and SH-51 split away to the south along I-244; this will be the final intersection US 412 and US 64 will have in Oklahoma. US 412 continues east along I-244. This interchange is also the southern terminus of L.L. Tisdale Parkway. I-244 and US 412 form the north side of the IDL; at its northeast corner, they interchange with US 75, the east side of the loop; south of the interchange, US 75 also carries the I-444 designation. I-244/US 412 continue east, with exit ramps to local streets, as well as SH-11 and US 169. I-244 ends at I-44/SH-66; US 412 forms a concurrency with the latter two routes as they continue east into Rogers County.

Upon entering Rogers County, I-44/US-412/SH-66 parallel the southern boundary of the county, staying just north of the Rogers–Tulsa and, further east, Rogers–Wagoner county lines. In Rogers County, the three highways enter the city of Catoosa, one of Tulsa's eastern suburbs. In Catoosa, the freeway serves as the southern terminus of SH-167, which serves the city's port and SH-66 splits off toward Claremore. I-44 and US 412 continue east for a short distance before going separate directions; I-44 exits from US-412 and joins the Will Rogers Turnpike. This interchange is also the northern terminus of the Creek Turnpike. US 412 becomes an expressway, and continues east of the interchange, passing through Fair Oaks on its way out of the Tulsa metro. In rural south-central Rogers County, it connects to SH-412P, a state highway spur to Port 33, before crossing the Verdigris River, a component of the McClellan–Kerr Arkansas River Navigation System. US 412 continues east through unincorporated territory before reaching Inola, where it has an interchange with SH-88, 1.39 miles (2.24 km) north of that highway's southern terminus. US 412 then heads eastward out of Rogers County.

After leaving Rogers County, the next county along US 412 is Mayes County. South of Chouteau, the route provides access to US 69 via an interchange. Just west of US 412's crossing of the Grand River, the highway intersects SH-412B, which connects US 412 to SH-69A. After crossing the river, US 412 comes to a fork in the road; one half of the fork is the Cherokee Turnpike, which mainline US 412 follows, while the other is US 412 Alternate, which runs parallel to the turnpike on an old alignment of US 412.

The first interchange on the Cherokee Turnpike is with SH-82 in Locust Grove. The turnpike continues east, passing into Delaware County to intersect US 412 Alternate again between Rose and Leach. East of this interchange, a service area lies in the median of the roadway; east of there, the highway passes through the Cherokee Turnpike's only mainline toll plaza. The turnpike's final interchange is with US 59 and SH-10 in Kansas. The Cherokee Turnpike then ends, merging with US 59; at this junction, US 412 Alternate, which was concurrent with US 59, also ends. US 59 and US 412 continue southeast through Flint, before turning due east to West Siloam Springs. There, US 59 splits away from US 412, while US 412 remains on an easterly trajectory, crossing the state line into Siloam Springs, Arkansas.

== History ==
US 412 initially connected Walnut Ridge, Arkansas to Jackson, Tennessee. Mr. Murphy, deputy director of ODOT, recommended to the Transportation Commission that US 412 be extended into Oklahoma on February 1, 1988. ODOT hoped that establishing US 412 in Oklahoma would generate new recreational traffic, thus benefiting the state economically. The new western terminus was to become the US 183/US 270 junction in Woodward; from there, the highway extended for 288.42 miles (464.17 km) to the east, exiting the state in West Siloam Springs. The Transportation Commission approved the recommendation unanimously.

The US 412 designation was applied to preexisting Oklahoma highways. From Woodward to just east of Enid, US 412 replaced SH-15. From there to the I-35 junction, it was overlaid on US 64; east of I-35, the designation was applied to the Cimarron Turnpike. US 412 continued east from the end of the turnpike along US 64. From there, it was routed through the Tulsa metropolitan freeway system along I-244 and I-44. East of Tulsa, the highway replaced SH-33 to the Arkansas line. The highway designations made redundant by US 412 were removed, effective December 12, 1988.

The first major change to US 412 occurred on November 5, 1991, when US 412 was rerouted onto the newly built Cherokee Turnpike. US 412 Scenic, which was later redesignated US 412 Alternate, was established along the old highway, allowing the highway system to retain a free alternate to the new toll road. US 412 was extended west on May 5, 1993; like its initial extension into Oklahoma, this new portion of US 412 followed existing highways: US 56, US 64, US 270 and SH-3.

Subsequent changes to US 412 have been more minor. On March 7, 1994, the highway was relocated near Chouteau. Finally, on October 4, 2004, the Transportation Commission approved the realignment of US 60, US 412 and SH-8 at their junction near Orienta. Other than routine maintenance, there have been no further changes to the highway since then.

== Tolls ==
As of 2013, passengers of two-axle vehicles (such as cars and motorcycles) pay a total of $3.00 to travel the entire length of the Cimarron Turnpike and $2.50 to travel the entire length of the Cherokee Turnpike. Tolls vary based on the entrance and exit used. Both turnpikes accept OTA's Pikepass transponder system as an alternative to cash payment. Pikepass customers receive discounted toll rates; the Pikepass rate for the full length of the Cimarron is $2.85, and the discounted rate for the Cherokee is $2.40.

Toll revenues from the two turnpikes US 412 uses are not necessarily used to maintain those highways. Under a practice known as cross-pledging, all OTA toll revenue is pledged against the sum of OTA's indebtedness, including bonds financing the state's other turnpikes.

== Future ==
Future Interstate 42
- Location: Noble County – Arkansas state line
- Length: 174 mi (280 km)

On May 20, 2021, Senator Jim Inhofe, Republican of Oklahoma, introduced legislation to designate the portion of US 412 between I-35 in Noble County and I-49 in Springdale, Arkansas as future Interstate 42. (I-42) The bill, titled the "Future Interstate in Oklahoma and Arkansas Act" (S. 1766), was cosponsored by senators John Boozman and Tom Cotton, both Republicans of Arkansas. The senators' stated reasons for seeking an Interstate designation along the US 412 included encouraging economic development, expanding opportunities for employment in the region, making travel safer and shipping easier, attracting new businesses, and better connecting rural and urban communities. Other supporters of the measure include the mayor of Tulsa, G. T. Bynum, and the heads of both ODOT and the Arkansas Department of Transportation (ArDOT). The language of the bill was later included in the Infrastructure Investment and Jobs Act (H.R. 3684). Interstate 42 (I-42) was the proposed designation but was withdrawn. ArDOT and ODOT later resubmitted the application to the Spring 2024 meeting; AASHTO approved the route as Interstate 42, conditional on it being upgraded to Interstate standards.

== Junction list ==
County	Location	mi	km	Exit	Destinations	Notes
Cimarron		0.00	0.00		US 56 west / US 64 west / US 412 west – Clayton	Continuation into New Mexico
Cimarron		28.4	45.7		US 385 south – Dalhart	Western end of US 385 concurrency
Cimarron	Boise City	31.7	51.0		US 385 north / SH-3 west (Cimarron Avenue north) / SH-325 west (Main Street west) – Kenton, Denver	Traffic circle around Cimarron County courthouse; eastern end of US-385 concurrency; western end of SH-3 concurrency; eastern terminus of SH-325
Cimarron		33.3	53.6		US 287 – Amarillo, Denver, Stratford	Interchange; US 287 exit 21
Cimarron		39.4	63.4		US 56 east – Elkhart	Eastern end of US 56 concurrency; former SH-114
Cimarron		47.1	75.8		SH-171 – Keyes, Stratford	
Texas		66.0	106.2		SH-95 north – Yarbrough, Elkhart	Western end of SH-95 concurrency
Texas		71.0	114.3		SH-95 south – Texhoma	Eastern end of SH-95 concurrency
Texas		89.1	143.4		SH-136 north – Hugoton	Western end of SH-136 concurrency
Texas	Guymon	93.4	150.3		US 64 east / US 412 Truck east / SH-3 Truck east / SH-136 Truck south (NE 12th Street)	Eastern end of US 64 concurrency; western terminus of US 412 Truck/SH-3 Truck; northern terminus of SH-136 Truck
Texas	Guymon	94.2	151.6		US 54 west (South 2nd Street)	Western end of US 54 concurrency
Texas	Guymon	94.6	152.2		US 412 Truck west / SH-3 Truck west / SH-136 Truck north (US 54 east) – Liberal	Eastern end of US 54 concurrency; eastern terminus of US 412 Truck/SH-3 Truck; southern terminus of SH-136 Truck
Texas	Guymon				US 54 east	Eastern end of US 54 concurrency
Texas	Guymon	94.65	152.32		SH-136 south (East Street)	Eastern end of SH-136 concurrency
Texas		109.2	175.7		SH-94 north – Hooker	Southern terminus of SH-94
Beaver		132.2	212.8		US 83 – Liberal, Beaver, Perryton, Turpin	
Beaver		149.1	240.0		US 270 west / SH-23 – Beaver, Booker	Western end of US 270 concurrency
Harper		184.3	296.6		US 283 – Laverne, Shattuck	
Harper	May	192.5	309.8		SH-46 – Buffalo, Gage	
Ellis	No major junctions					
Woodward	Fort Supply	201.9	324.9		US 183 north – Buffalo	Western end of US 183 concurrency
Woodward	Woodward	215.8	347.3		SH-15 west (Oklahoma Avenue west)	Eastern terminus of SH-15
Woodward	Woodward	217.9	350.7		US 270 east / SH-3 east / US 183 south / SH-34 (9th Street)	Eastern end of US 183/US 270/SH-3 concurrency
Woodward		227.0	365.3		SH-50 south	Western end of SH-50 concurrency
Woodward	Mooreland	228.3	367.4		SH-50 north (Main Street)	Eastern end of SH-50 concurrency
Major		246.1	396.1		US 281 – Waynoka, Seiling, Little Sahara State Park	
Major	Orienta	270.5	435.3		US 60 west / SH-8 south – Orienta, Fairview	Western end of US 60/SH-8 concurrency
Major		273.5	440.2		SH-8 north	Northern end of SH-8 concurrency
Major		284.2	457.4		SH-58	
Garfield		296.2	476.7		SH-132 south	Western end of SH-132 concurrency
Garfield		297.2	478.3		SH-132 north	Eastern end of SH-132 concurrency
Garfield	Enid	304.2	489.6		US 60 east / US 81 (Van Buren Street)	Eastern end of US 60 concurrency
Garfield	Enid	307.2	494.4		US 64 west – Northwestern Oklahoma State University, Northern Oklahoma College, Enid Campuses	Interchange; western end of US 64 concurrency
Garfield		321.2	516.9		SH-15 east / SH-74 – Covington, Garber	Interchange; western terminus of SH-15
Noble		335.6	540.1		I-35 / US 64 east – Perry, Oklahoma City, Wichita	Interchange; western end of controlled-access highway; eastern end of US 64 concurrency; last free exit eastbound; future western terminus of I-42; I-35 exit 194
See Cimarron Turnpike
Pawnee	Westport	394.8	635.4	—	US 64 west to SH-48 south – Cleveland, Bristow, Pawnee	Westbound exit and eastbound entrance; western end of US 64 concurrency; last free exit westbound
Pawnee	Westport	396.6	638.3	—	Westport Road	Serves Westport Airport
Pawnee	Westport	400.1	643.9	—	Old Keystone Road	
Pawnee	Westport	402.0	647.0	—	Bears Glen	
Osage	No major junctions					
Tulsa	Sand Springs	404.4	650.8	—	SH-151 south – Keystone State Park	Northern terminus of SH-151
Tulsa	Sand Springs	405.7	652.9	—	209th West Avenue	
Tulsa	Sand Springs	407.7	656.1	—	177th West Avenue	
Tulsa	Sand Springs	411.0	661.4	—	Willow Street	
Tulsa	Sand Springs	412.2	663.4	—	SH-51 west / SH-97 junction – Sapulpa, Mannford	Western end of SH-51 concurrency
Tulsa	Sand Springs				2nd Street	Eastbound entrance only
Tulsa	Sand Springs	413.0	664.7	—	Adams Road	Westbound exit only
Tulsa	Sand Springs	414.4	666.9	—	81st West Avenue	
Tulsa	Tulsa	415.3	668.4	—	65th West Avenue	Westbound access via SH-344 exit
Tulsa	Tulsa			—	SH-344 (Gilcrease Expressway)	
Tulsa	Tulsa	416.4	670.1	—	49th West Avenue	Eastbound access via SH-344 exit
Tulsa	Tulsa	417.5	671.9	—	33rd West Avenue	Westbound exit and eastbound entrance
Tulsa	Tulsa	417.9	672.5		25th West Avenue	
Tulsa	Tulsa	418.5	673.5	—	Quanah Avenue	Eastbound exit and westbound entrance
Tulsa	Tulsa	418.8– 419.0	674.0– 674.3	—	I-244 west / US 64 east / SH-51 east to US 75 south – Broken Arrow, Okmulgee, Oklahoma City	Eastbound exit and westbound left entrance; eastern end of US 64/SH-51 concurrency; I-244 exit 5B
Tulsa	Tulsa	418.8– 419.0	674.0– 674.3	—	L.L. Tisdale Parkway north	Left entrance eastbound; no westbound exit; southern terminus of L.L. Tisdale Parkway
Tulsa	Tulsa	418.8– 419.0	674.0– 674.3	—	I-244 west / US 64 east / SH-51 east – Broken Arrow, Oklahoma City	Westbound exit and eastbound entrance; western end of I-244 concurrency; I-244 exit 5B
Tulsa	Tulsa	418.8– 419.0	674.0– 674.3	5C	L.L. Tisdale Parkway north	Westbound exit only; exit numbers follow I-244; southern terminus of L.L. Tisdale Parkway
Tulsa	Tulsa	419.6	675.3	6A	M.L.K. Jr. Boulevard, Detroit Avenue	Left exit and entrance eastbound; M.L.K. Jr. Blvd. is formerly Cincinnati Boulevard
Tulsa	Tulsa	420.3	676.4	6B	US 75 (I-444 south) – Bartlesville, Okmulgee	I-444 unsigned; left entrance eastbound from US 75 north, left exits
Tulsa	Tulsa			6C	1st Street – Downtown	Westbound exit and eastbound entrance
Tulsa	Tulsa	421.0	677.5	7	Utica Avenue	
Tulsa	Tulsa	422.0	679.1	8	Delaware Avenue	
Tulsa	Tulsa	422.7	680.3	9	Harvard Avenue	Eastbound access is part of exit 8
Tulsa	Tulsa	423.5	681.6	10	Yale Avenue	
Tulsa	Tulsa	424.6	683.3	11	Sheridan Road – Tulsa Zoo	Left exits and entrances
Tulsa	Tulsa	425.6	684.9	12A	Memorial Drive	Left exits and entrances
Tulsa	Tulsa	425.9	685.4	12B	SH-11 west – Tulsa International Airport	Left exit eastbound
Tulsa	Tulsa	426.6	686.5	13A	Mingo Road	Eastbound exit and westbound entrance
Tulsa	Tulsa	427.0	687.2	13B-C	US 169 – Owasso, Nowata	Signed as exits 13B (north) and 13C (south)
Tulsa	Tulsa	427.7	688.3	14	Garnett Road	
Tulsa	Tulsa	428.5	689.6	15	129th East Avenue	Eastbound exit and westbound entrance
Tulsa	Tulsa	429.1	690.6	—	I-44 west / SH-66 west – Sapulpa, Oklahoma City	Westbound left exit and eastbound left entrance; eastern terminus of I-244; eastern end of I-244 concurrency; western end of I-44/SH-66 concurrency
Tulsa–Rogers county line	Tulsa–Catoosa line	430.9	693.5	238	165th East Avenue	Exit numbers follow I-44
Tulsa–Rogers county line	Tulsa–Catoosa line	432.7	696.4	240	SH-167 north (193rd East Avenue)	
Tulsa–Rogers county line	Catoosa	433.2	697.2	241	SH-66 east – Catoosa, Claremore	Eastern end of SH-66 concurrency; no eastbound entrance; former US 66 east
Rogers	Fair Oaks	433.8– 434.3	698.1– 698.9	—	I-44 Toll east / Will Rogers Turnpike east / Creek Turnpike west – Claremore, Joplin, Oklahoma City	Eastern end of I-44 concurrency; Creek Turnpike exits 33A-B
Rogers	Fair Oaks				4115 Road	At-grade intersection; eastern end of freeway
Rogers		440.6	709.1		SH-412P	Northern terminus of SH-412P
Rogers		446.1	717.9		SH-88 – Inola, Claremore	Interchange
Mayes	Chouteau	456.3	734.3		US 69 – Wagoner, Chouteau	Interchange
Mayes		459.9	740.1		SH-412B	Southern terminus of SH-412B
Mayes		460.8	741.6		US 412 Alt. east – Locust Grove, Siloam Springs	Eastbound left exit and westbound entrance; last free exit eastbound; western terminus of US 412 Alt.
Mayes		460.8	741.6	Cherokee Turnpike begins		
Mayes	Locust Grove	467.0	751.6	6	SH-82 – Locust Grove, Tahlequah	Tolled eastbound exit and westbound entrance; exit numbers follow Cherokee Turnpike
Delaware	Rose	477.9	769.1	17	US 412 Alt. – Rose, Leach	Tolled eastbound exit and westbound entrance
Delaware		479.4	771.5	18	Cherokee Service Plaza	Closed and demolished; left exits and entrances
Delaware		480.5	773.3	Toll gantry		
Delaware	Kansas	489.1	787.1	28	US 59 / SH-10 – Kansas, Tahlequah	Tolled westbound exit and eastbound entrance
Delaware	Flint Creek	493.4	794.1	Cherokee Turnpike ends		
Delaware	Flint Creek	493.4	794.1		US 59 north / US 412 Alt. west – Kansas, Grove, Tulsa	Westbound left exit and eastbound left entrance; last free exit westbound; eastern terminus of US 412 Alt.; western end of US 59 concurrency
Delaware	West Siloam Springs	501.9	807.7		US 59 south – Watts, Westville, Stilwell	Eastern end of US 59 concurrency
Oklahoma–Arkansas line		504.11	811.29		Future I-42 east / US 412 east – Siloam Springs, Springdale	Continuation into Arkansas
1.000 mi = 1.609 km; 1.000 km = 0.621 mi: Closed/former; Concurrency terminus; Electronic toll collection; Incomplete access

== Spur routes ==
US 412 anchors three state highway spur routes in Oklahoma. These three routes all bear the number "412" with a letter suffix, on an Oklahoma state highway shield.

=== SH-412A ===
State Highway 412A
- Location: Oaks, Oklahoma
- Length: 2.98 mi (4.80 km)
- Existed: ca. 1957–present

State Highway 412A is the only US 412 spur route to not directly connect to mainline US 412. SH-412A has a total length of 2.98 miles (4.80 km).

SH-412A begins at the Cherokee–Delaware county line in the town of Oaks. The route proceeds north through town. After leaving Oaks, the highway enters unincorporated territory before ending at US 412 Alternate at the unincorporated location of Twin Oaks.

SH-412A existed prior to the extension of US 412 in Oklahoma. As the adjacent section of highway was part of SH-33 prior to becoming US 412, what would become SH-412A was originally designated as SH-33C. SH-33C was first shown on the Oklahoma state highway map in 1958. At the time of the highway's designation, it was a gravel highway; by 1959, however, it had been paved. The first revision of the state highway map to reflect the renumbering of SH-33 to US 412 was the 1989 edition; this was also the first to show SH-33C redesignated as SH-412A.

=== SH-412B ===
State Highway 412B
- Location: Mayes County, Oklahoma
- Length: 5.33 mi (8.58 km)
- Existed: ca. 1986–present

State Highway 412B is a spur route of US 412 lying entirely within Mayes County. It is 5.33 miles (8.58 km) long.

SH-412B begins at US 412 just west of the Grand River bridge and the western terminus of the Cherokee Turnpike. From there, the highway follows a winding path to the north, passing east of Chouteau, before ending at SH-69A between MidAmerica Industrial Park to the west and Sportsmen Acres to the east.

The highway that is currently SH-412B was first shown on the official state map in 1987 as SH-33G, connecting to SH-33 at its southern terminus. By 1989, the first edition of the map to show US-412 in Oklahoma, SH-33G had been renumbered to SH-412B.

=== SH-412P ===
State Highway 412P
- Location: Rogers County, Oklahoma
- Length: 1.26 mi (2.03 km)

State Highway 412P is a spur of US 412 in Rogers County. SH-412P begins at US 412 heading south, then turns east. It then ends at Port 33 of the McClellan–Kerr Arkansas River Navigation System, along the Verdigris River. SH-412P is 1.26 miles (2.03 km) long. The highway does not appear on the official state map.

U.S. Route 412
Previous state: New Mexico	Oklahoma	Next state: Arkansas
