= Cherokee Turnpike =

Highway in Oklahoma, U.S.

Cherokee Turnpike
- Cherokee highlighted in red

Route information
- Maintained by Oklahoma Turnpike Authority
- Length: 32.8 mi (52.8 km)
- Existed: November 5, 1991–present
- Component highways: Future I-42 / US 412 Toll entire length

Major junctions
- West end: Future I-42 / US 412 near Locust Grove
- East end: Future I-42 / US 59 / US 412 in Flint Creek

Location
- Country: United States
- State: Oklahoma
- Counties: Mayes, Delaware

Highway system
- Oklahoma State Highway System; Interstate; US; State; Turnpikes

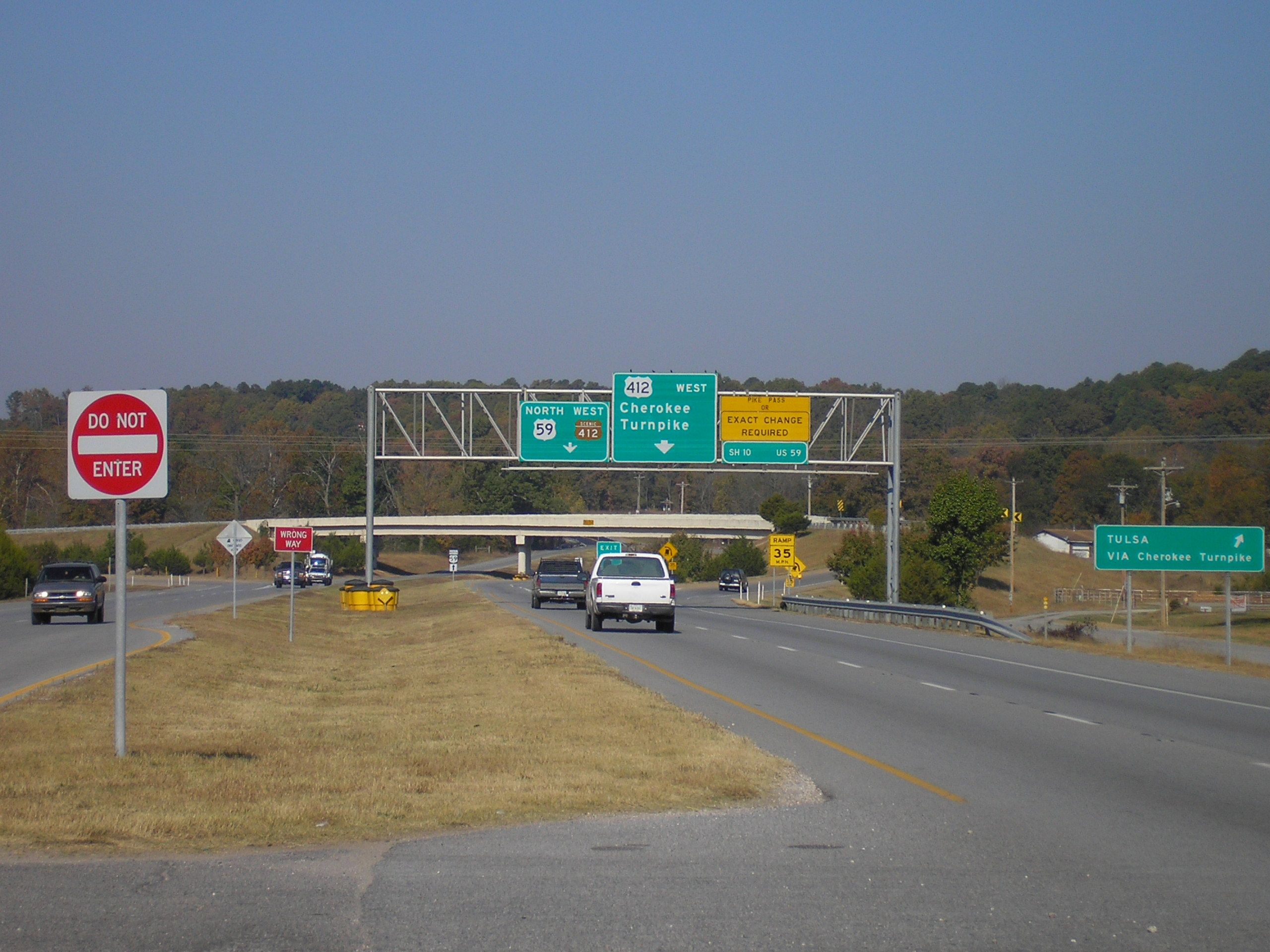
Eastern terminus of the Cherokee Turnpike near Kansas, Oklahoma. Exiting right takes traffic onto the toll road; continuing due west is US 59/US 412 Alternate.

The Cherokee Turnpike is a controlled-access toll road in eastern Oklahoma. Opened in 1991, the route is a four-lane freeway carrying US 412 from east of Kansas, Oklahoma to east of Chouteau and has a total length of 32.8 miles (52.8 km) and a speed limit of 80 mph (130 km/h). As of November 2025, The Cherokee Turnpike is the easternmost road in the United States with a posted 80 MPH speed limit.

An alternate route, US 412 Alternate, provides a free but not controlled-access route through the towns bypassed by the Turnpike with only a 55 mph (89 km/h) speed limit.

== Route description ==
The turnpike begins by branching off US 412 east of the Grand River in Mayes County. The turnpike carries US 412 for its entire length; the old alignment of US 412, which was also at one time State Highway 33, is now US 412 Alternate. The Cherokee Turnpike runs within a close distance of US 412 Alternate for its entire length. The turnpike generally varies only a few degrees from true east–west throughout its entire route.

The turnpike's first exit is a diamond interchange with State Highway 82 just south of Locust Grove. From this point, the road travels 11 miles (18 km) without another exit. During this interval, the highway crosses from Mayes into Delaware County. Just after crossing the county line, the Cherokee has its second exit, again meeting US 412 Alternate southeast of Rose. This second exit is a partial cloverleaf with loop ramps in the northwest, northeast, and southwest quadrants.

Continuing east, the turnpike passes through a barrier toll plaza. The final exit, another 11 miles (18 km) from the US 412 Alternate exit, occurs north of Kansas, Oklahoma at US 59/SH-10, which is another diamond interchange. After this interchange, US 412 Alternate crosses over the turnpike with no interchange. The median gradually widens again as US 412 Alternate, now concurrent with US 59, crosses under the westbound lanes and begins running through the median. The eastbound lanes eventually merge with US 59/US 412 Alternate. This marks the eastern terminus of both the Cherokee Turnpike and US 412 Alternate. US 59 and mainline US 412 continue east toward West Siloam Springs, Oklahoma where they split and US 412 crosses the state line into Siloam Springs, Arkansas.

== History ==
The Cherokee Turnpike resulted from the same 1987 compromise between urban and rural legislators that resulted in the Kilpatrick, Creek and Chickasaw Turnpikes. The turnpike opened to traffic on November 5, 1991.

== Services ==
An Oklahoma Tourism Information Center is located on the turnpike near the Kansas exit, 13 miles (21 km) from the Arkansas–Oklahoma state line. Free coffee is available at the tourism center.

Law enforcement along the Cherokee Turnpike is provided by Oklahoma Highway Patrol Troop XD, a special troop assigned to the turnpike.

== Tolls ==
A two-axle vehicle currently pays $5.70 (PikePass holders pay less) to drive the full length of the Turnpike. This is equivalent of a toll of 17 cents per mile. Drivers in vehicles with more than two axles, such as truckers, pay higher tolls.

Tolls are collected for eastbound traffic upon exiting at Locust Grove and Leach, and entry at Kansas. Westbound traffic must pay toll upon exit at Kansas and entry at Leach and Locust Grove. All traffic passing through the barrier toll west of the Kansas exit must pay toll, regardless of direction.

== Future ==
Future Interstate 42
- Location: Noble County – Arkansas state line
- Length: 174 mi (280 km)

On May 20, 2021, Senator Jim Inhofe, Republican of Oklahoma, introduced legislation to designate the portion of US 412 between I-35 in Noble County and I-49 in Springdale, Arkansas as future Interstate 42. (I-42) The bill, titled the "Future Interstate in Oklahoma and Arkansas Act" (S. 1766), was cosponsored by senators John Boozman and Tom Cotton, both Republicans of Arkansas. The senators' stated reasons for seeking an Interstate designation along the US 412 included encouraging economic development, expanding opportunities for employment in the region, making travel safer and shipping easier, attracting new businesses, and better connecting rural and urban communities. Other supporters of the measure include the mayor of Tulsa, G. T. Bynum, and the heads of both ODOT and the Arkansas Department of Transportation (ArDOT). The language of the bill was later included in the Infrastructure Investment and Jobs Act (H.R. 3684). Interstate 42 (I-42) was the proposed designation but was withdrawn. ArDOT and ODOT later resubmitted the application to the Spring 2024 meeting; AASHTO approved the route as Interstate 42, conditional on it being upgraded to Interstate standards.

== Exit list ==
County	Location	mi	km	Exit	Destinations	Notes
Mayes		0.00	0.00		Future I-42 west / US 412 west – Tulsa	Western end of Cherokee Turnpike and toll road
Mayes		0.00	0.00		US 412 Alt. east – Locust Grove, Siloam Springs	Eastbound left exit and westbound entrance; last free exit eastbound
Mayes	Locust Grove	6.2	10.0	6	SH-82 – Locust Grove, Tahlequah	Tolled eastbound exit and westbound entrance
Delaware	Rose	17.1	27.5	17	US 412 Alt. – Rose, Leach	Tolled eastbound exit and westbound entrance
Delaware		18.6	29.9	18	Cherokee Service Plaza	Closed and demolished; left exits and entrances
Delaware		19.7	31.7	Toll gantry		
Delaware	Kansas	28.3	45.5	28	US 59 / SH-10 – Kansas, Tahlequah	Tolled westbound exit and eastbound entrance
Delaware	Flint Creek	32.8	52.8		US 59 north / US 412 Alt. west – Kansas, Tulsa	Westbound left exit and eastbound left entrance; last free exit westbound
Delaware	Flint Creek	32.8	52.8		Future I-42 east / US 59 south / US 412 east – Siloam Springs	Eastern end of Cherokee Turnpike and toll road
1.000 mi = 1.609 km; 1.000 km = 0.621 mi: Closed/former; Electronic toll collection; Incomplete access

== See also ==
- Oklahoma Turnpike Authority
- Pikepass
