= Oklahoma State Highway 136 =

Highway in Oklahoma, United States

State Highway 136

Route information
- Maintained by ODOT
- Length: 36.2 mi (58.3 km)

Major junctions
- South end: SH 136 at the Texas state line
- US 54 / US 64 / US 412 / SH-3 in Guymon
- North end: K-25 at the Kansas state line

Location
- Country: United States
- State: Oklahoma

Highway system
- Oklahoma State Highway System; Interstate; US; State; Turnpikes
← SH-135	→ SH-137

State Highway 136 (abbreviated SH-136) is a state highway in Oklahoma. It runs 36.2 miles (58.3 km) across Texas County in the Oklahoma Panhandle, from the adjoining state of Texas in the south to Kansas in the north. SH-136 does not have any letter-suffixed spur routes branching from it, however, it does have a truck route bypassing downtown Guymon.

State Highway 136 was designated as such to match the number of the Texas state highway to which it connects.

== Route description ==
SH-136 begins at the Texas state line about 20 miles (32 km) north of Gruver. It runs north 13 miles (21 km) to Guymon, where it joins US-64, US-412 and SH-3 through the city. The routes divide five miles (8 km) north of Guymon, after crossing the Beaver River, with Highway 136 running uninterrupted the remaining 18 miles (29 km) to the Kansas line.

== Junction list ==
County	Location	mi	km	Destinations	Notes
Texas–Oklahoma state line		0.0	0.0	SH 136 continues south into Texas	
Texas	Guymon	13.6	21.9	US 412 / SH-3	Southern end of US-412/SH-3 concurrency
Texas	Guymon	13.6	21.9	US 54 / US 412 Truck / SH-3 Truck / SH-136 Truck	Eastern end of US-54 concurrency
Texas	Guymon	14.0	22.5	US 54	Western end of US-54 concurrency
Texas	Guymon	14.8	23.8	US 64 / US 412 Truck / SH-3 Truck / SH-136 Truck	Southern end of US-64 concurrency
Texas		19.1	30.7	US 64 / US 412 / SH-3	Northern end of US-64/US-412/SH-3 concurrency
Oklahoma–Kansas state line		36.2	58.3	K-25 continues north into Kansas	
1.000 mi = 1.609 km; 1.000 km = 0.621 mi: Concurrency terminus
