= Oklahoma State Highway 95 =

State highway in Oklahoma, United States

State Highway 95

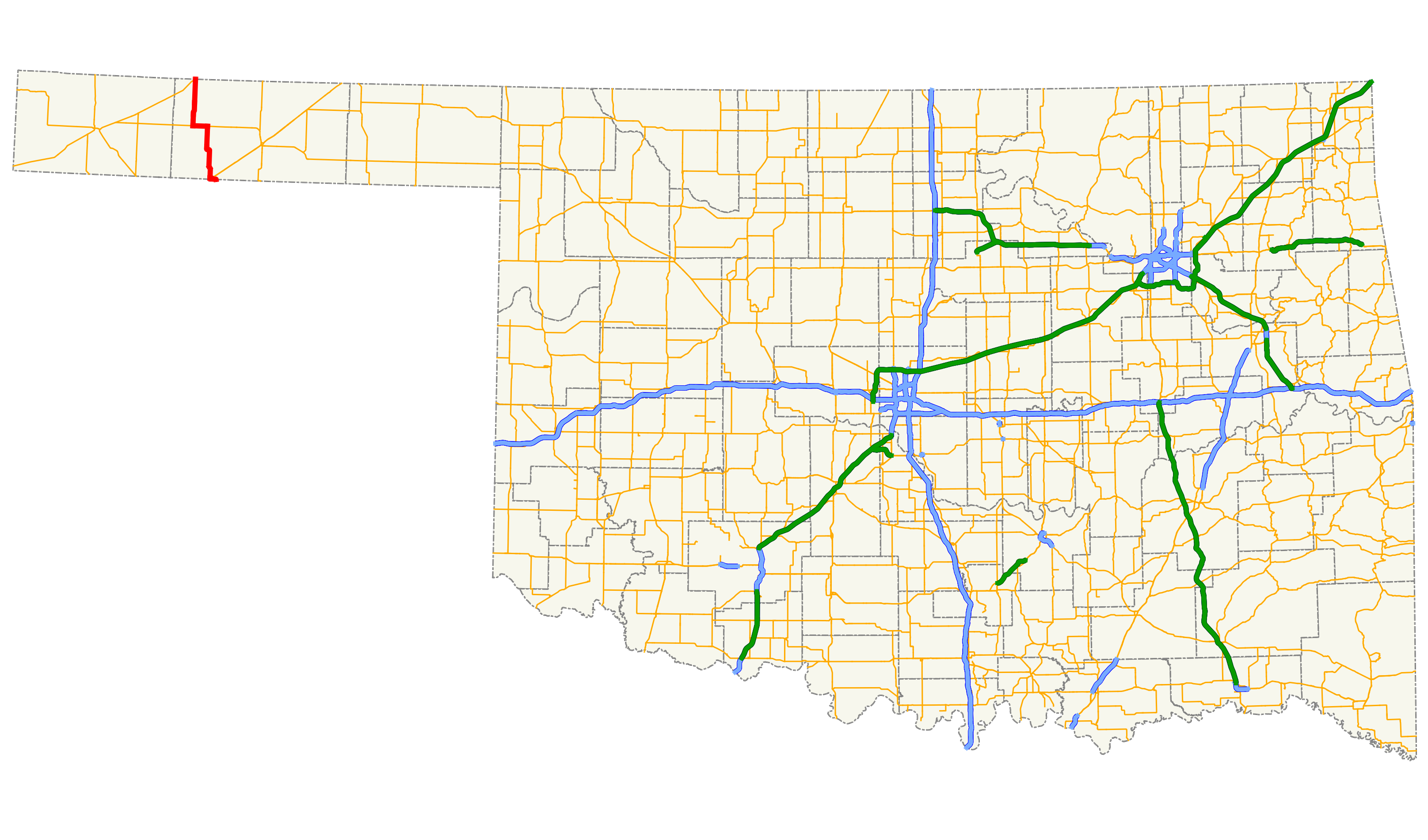

Route information
- Maintained by ODOT
- Length: 42.1 mi (67.8 km)
- Existed: ca. 1952–present

Major junctions
- South end: FM 1290 at the Texas state line near Texhoma
- US 54 in Texhoma; US 64 / US 412 / SH-3 in Four Corners
- North end: US 56 south of Elkhart, Kan.

Location
- Country: United States
- State: Oklahoma

Highway system
- Oklahoma State Highway System; Interstate; US; State; Turnpikes
← SH-94	→ SH-96

State Highway 95 (abbreviated SH-95) is a state highway in the Panhandle region of the U.S. state of Oklahoma. This route, which is 42.1 miles (67.8 km) long, runs entirely through western Texas County. SH-95 does not have any lettered spur routes.

== Route description ==
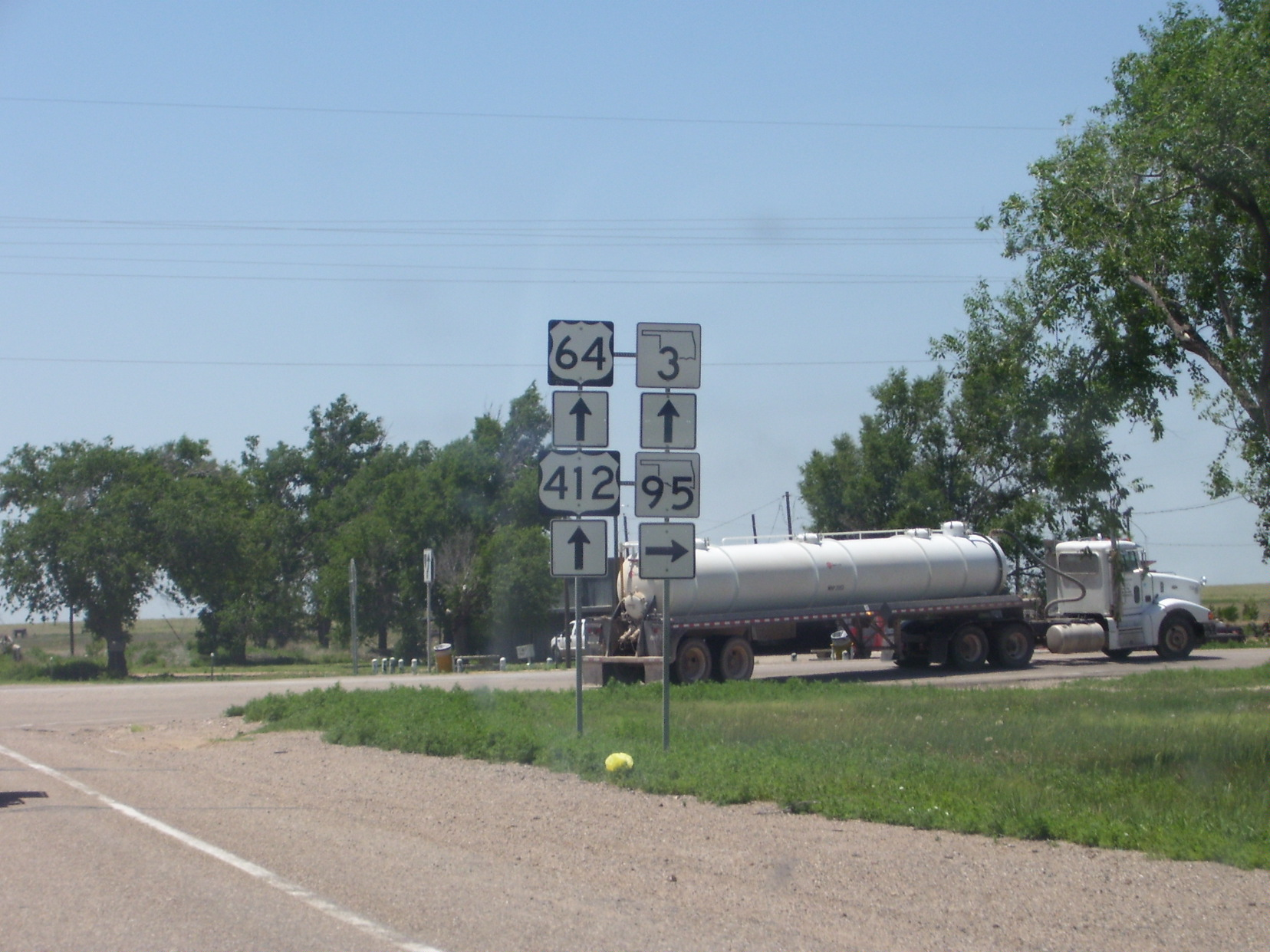
SH-95 signage at Four Corners

SH-95 begins where Farm to Market Road 1290 crosses into Oklahoma from Texas. Feet (meters) after crossing the state line, the highway curves to the west to parallel the state line as it approaches Texhoma. In Texhoma, the route crosses US-54. SH-95 then turns north immediately after the intersection. It then bridges the Beaver River and heads north for 19 miles (31 km), after which it meets US-64/412/SH-3.

SH-95 turns west to run concurrent with the other three routes. The four routes proceed together for 5 miles (8.0 km). SH-95 then splits off to the north at Four Corners. The route then passes through Eva and runs east of Surrey Hills before meeting US-56 just south of Elkhart, Kansas. This intersection serves as SH-95's northern terminus.

== History ==
State Highway 95 began as an unnumbered farm-to-market road. It was first assigned the SH-95 designation between 1950 and 1954. By 1955, US-56 had been established through Oklahoma. Its original route followed the section of SH-95 north of US-64, so SH-95 was truncated back to the US-64 junction. This change was reverted in 1961, and US-56 and SH-95 ran concurrent north of US-64. The following year, US-56 was rerouted over SH-114, leaving SH-95 on its own once again.

Before 2003, SH-95 extended 0.1 miles (0.16 km) beyond US-56 to the Kansas state line, connecting to K-27. After KDOT realigned K-27 to run east of Elkhart, ODOT truncated SH-95 to US-56.

== Junction list ==
The entire route is in Texas County.

Location	mi	km	Destinations	Notes
	0.00	0.00	FM 1290 south – Gruver	Continuation into Texas
Texhoma	1.9	3.1	US 54 (South Street) – Stratford TX, Goodwell	
	21.2	34.1	US 64 east / US 412 east / SH-3 east – Guymon, Oklahoma City	Southern end of US-64 / US-412 / SH-3 concurrency
Four Corners	26.2	42.2	US 64 west / US 412 west / SH-3 west – Boise City	Northern end of US-64 / US-412 / SH-3 concurrency
	42.1	67.8	US 56 – Hugoton Ks., Boise City	Northern terminus; road continues as Muncy Avenue
1.000 mi = 1.609 km; 1.000 km = 0.621 mi: Concurrency terminus
