= Oklahoma State Highway 3 =

Highway in Oklahoma

State Highway 3

Route information
- Maintained by ODOT
- Length: 615.0 mi (989.7 km)
- Existed: 1939–present

Major junctions
- West end: US 287 / US 385 at the CO state line near Boise City
- I-344 / Kilpatrick Turnpike near Oklahoma City; I-44 in Oklahoma City; I-40 in Oklahoma City; I-35 in Oklahoma City; I-40 in Shawnee; Indian Nation Turnpike in Antlers
- East end: AR 32 at the AR state line near Tom

Location
- Country: United States
- State: Oklahoma

Highway system
- Oklahoma State Highway System; Interstate; US; State; Turnpikes
← SH-2	→ SH-4

State Highway 3, also abbreviated as SH-3 or OK-3, is a highway maintained by the U.S. state of Oklahoma. Traveling diagonally through Oklahoma, from the Panhandle to the far southeastern corner of the state, SH-3 is the longest state highway in the Oklahoma road system, at a total length of 615 miles (990 km) via SH-3E (see below).

== Route description ==
=== In the northwest ===
SH 3 begins at the Colorado state line 19 mi (31 km) north of Boise City, Oklahoma. At this terminus, it is concurrent with US-287/US-385. It remains concurrent with the two U.S. Routes until reaching Boise City, with US-287 splitting away at an intersection north of the city. US-385/SH-3 then encounter a traffic circle which contains five other highways. After the circle, US-385 splits off, and SH-3, US-56, US-64, and US-412, though US-56 splits off within the next 8 miles (13 km).

In Guymon, US-64 splits off. At Elmwood, US-270 joins US-412, coming from a concurrency with SH-23. SH-3 remains concurrent with US-270 through Watonga. In Seiling, US-183 leaves the concurrency but is quickly replaced by U.S. Highway 281. SH-33 joins the roadbed 20 miles (32 km) later.

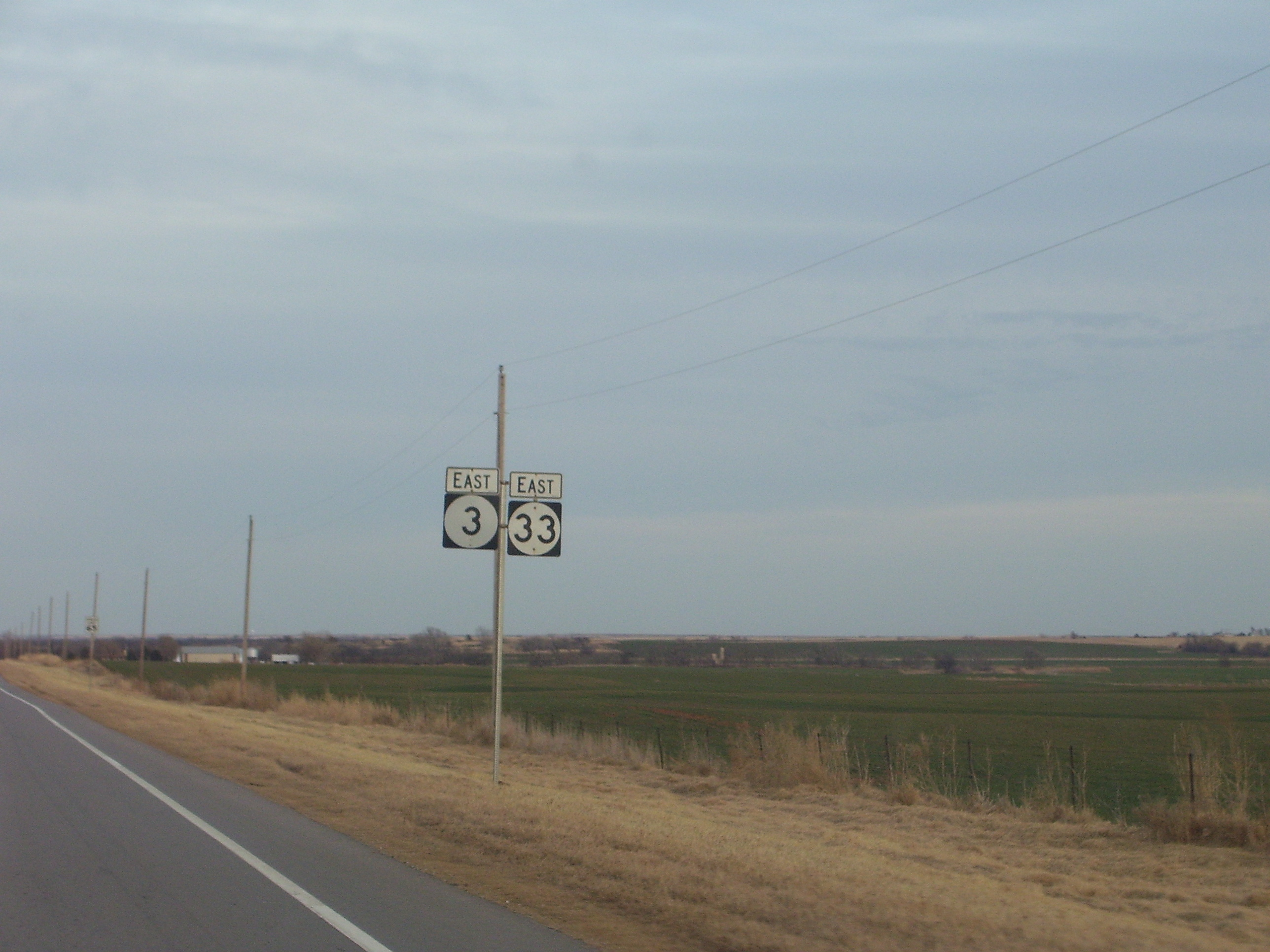
SH-3 and SH-33 concurrency between Watonga and Kingfisher.

In Watonga, SH-33 and SH-3 split off from US-270 and US-281. SH-3 and SH-33 remain concurrent for an additional 28 miles (45 km), until Kingfisher, where SH-3 joins US-81. It will stay concurrent with US-81 for 13 miles (21 km), through the town of Okarche. 3 miles (4.8 km) after Okarche, SH-3 leaves US-81. This marks the first point that SH-3 has not been part of a concurrency.

=== Through Oklahoma City ===
Beginning at the split from US-81, SH-3 becomes a major artery in the Oklahoma City highway system, commonly known as the Northwest Expressway because it is a diagonal route and because it serves the northwestern part of the metro area (despite the fact that it is a suburban arterial road and not an expressway due to the high commercial density). It skirts the northern limits of El Reno before entering the Oklahoma City limits. The often-congested Northwest Expressway passes through the suburb of Warr Acres and passes close to Lake Hefner.

At the intersection with the Lake Hefner Parkway (SH-74), SH-3 again re-enters a concurrency. The Lake Hefner Parkway ends very shortly after, and SH-3 becomes concurrent with I-44 through the western side of the city. Near Will Rogers World Airport, SH-3 transfers to I-240 along the southern side of the city. After I-240 ends, SH-3 is transferred onto I-40/US-270, which it remains concurrent with for 16 miles (26 km).

=== SH-3E/3W split ===
In Shawnee, SH-3 splits into two highways, SH-3E and SH-3W. SH-3W splits off I-40 onto US-177, along with US-270, at milemarker 181 on I-40. It continues along with US-270 and US-177 through the west side of Shawnee and continues south of that city until Tecumseh, where US-270 splits off. South of Asher, SH-3W leaves US-177 and veers southeast toward Ada.

SH-3E, the longer of the two split routes, was the original routing of Highway 3 before the two highways were split. It remains on I-40 for 5 miles (8.0 km) after SH-3W splits off. When it does split off, it joins SH-18. It follows a route closer to the center of Shawnee. After leaving Shawnee, it heads southeast toward Seminole. Here, it meets US-377/SH-99. SH-3E merges onto this highway, and they will remain concurrent until after they reach Ada.

In Ada, SH-3E and SH-3W are reunited and become SH-3 once again.

=== Ada to Atoka ===
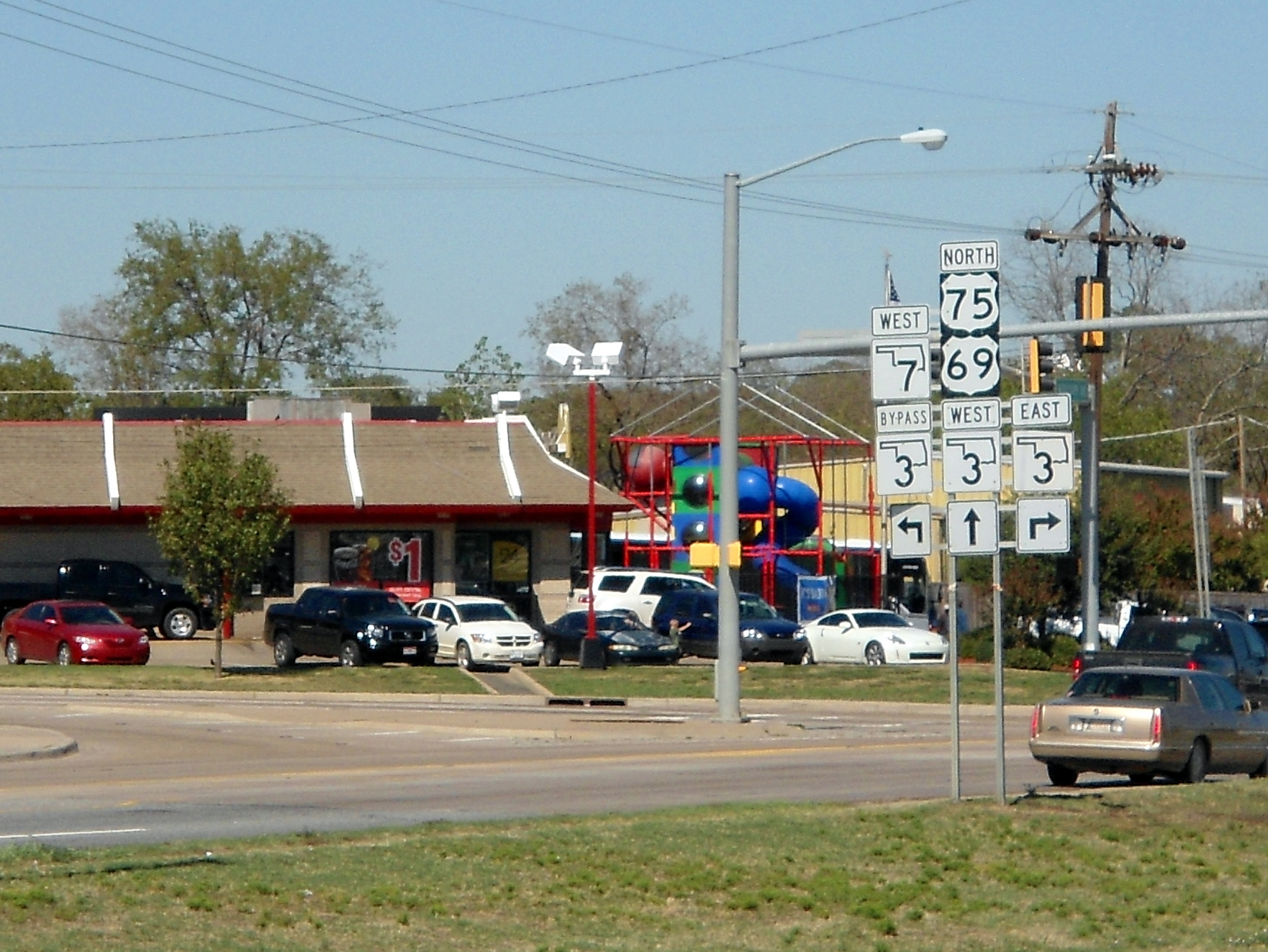
SH-3 intersects US 69/US 75, SH-7, and Bypass SH-3 in Atoka.

SH-3 then becomes part of the Richardson Loop, a freeway around the west and south sides of Ada. Throughout the Richardson Loop, it overlaps SH-1 and US-377/SH-99 at different times. The highway then becomes two-lane once again and heads southeast to the town of Coalgate, where begins an 18-mile (29 km) concurrency with US-75, lasting through Atoka. In Atoka, US-75 splits off to join US-69.

=== Antlers to Arkansas ===
Two miles west of Antlers, the highway has an interchange with the Indian Nation Turnpike, and in Antlers it intersects U.S. Highway 271. After reaching the town of Broken Bow, it turns southward and overlaps US-259 and US-70.

Near Idabel, the highway splits off after being with US-259 for 13 miles (21 km). 28 miles (45 km) later, it becomes AR 32 as it crosses the state line into Arkansas.

== History ==
The current SH-3 was designated on 15 May 1939. The original highway included all of current SH-3 up to Antlers, where it terminated at US-271. It was extended to the Arkansas state line on 4 August 1952. SH-3 ended there concurrent with US-70 and SH-7, near DeQueen, Arkansas. On 7 January 1963, the highway was given its own alignment from near Idabel to Arkansas, taking over that of SH-21, which was eliminated at that time.

From the highway's commissioning to 1976, there was only one fork of SH-3 between Shawnee and Ada, which was the path of current SH-3E. SH-3W and SH-3E were created on 4 October 1976; the new SH-3W took over all of SH-13. Other than minor realignments, the highway remains essentially the same today.

In the early 1980s, Governor George Nigh was able to obtain $97.1 million to upgrade the highway between Oklahoma City and Colorado, despite opponents labeling the project "the highway to nowhere". House Concurrent Resolution 1067 labeled the highway as "Governor George Nigh's Northwest Passage." ODOT officially so named the highway on 2 February 1981.

== Notes ==
- SH-3's concurrency with I-44 in Oklahoma City is an example of a wrong-way concurrency – I-44 West is SH-3 East and vice versa.
- SH-3's concurrency with US-70 is also a wrong-way concurrency, as US-70 is signed as going west and SH-3 as going east.
- The SH-3 bypass around Atoka is named the Cecil B. "Bud" Greathouse Bypass. It was designated by ODOT on 4 October 1982.

== Spurs ==

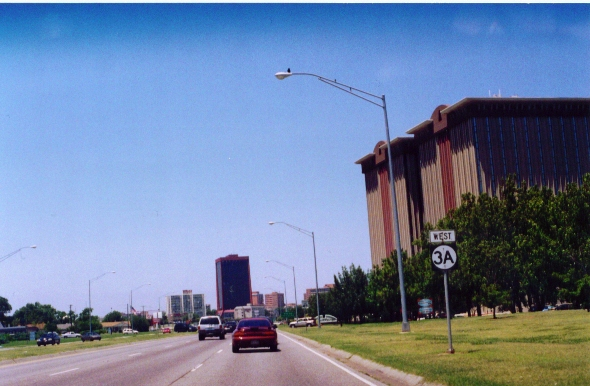
Former SH-3A

SH-3 had two lettered spurs, SH-3A and SH-3B.

SH-3A continued the alignment of the Northwest Expressway for two more miles before ending at I-44 near Penn Square Mall. It was originally known as SH-66A, a spur off US 66, which once ran through the area. The combined effect of US-66 being decommissioned and "3A" being a more logical name for an extension of SH-3 led to the name change. SH-3A was decommissioned in 2009.

SH-3B is entirely in Atoka, Oklahoma and runs between US-75/SH-3 and SH-7.

== Junction list ==
County	Location	mi	km	Exit	Destinations	Notes
Cimarron		0.00	0.00		US 287 north / US 385 north	Continuation into Colorado; western end of US-287/US-385 concurrency
Cimarron		17.6	28.3		US 287 south	Eastern end of US-287 concurrency
Cimarron	Boise City	18.5	29.8		US 56 west / US 64 west / US 412 west / US 385 south (Cimarron Avenue south) / SH-325 west (Main Street west) – Clayton, NM, Kenton	Traffic circle around Cimarron County courthouse; eastern end of US-385 concurrency; western end of US-412 concurrency; western end of US-56 concurrency; western end of US-64 concurrency; eastern terminus of SH-325
Cimarron		20.3	32.7		US 287 – Amarillo, TX, Denver, CO, Stratford, TX	Interchange
Cimarron		26.4	42.5		US 56 east	Eastern end of US-56 concurrency; former SH-114
Cimarron		34.1	54.9		SH-171	
Texas	Four Corners	53.0	85.3		SH-95 north	Western end of SH-95 concurrency
Texas		58.0	93.3		SH-95 south	Eastern end of SH-95 concurrency
Texas		76.1	122.5		SH-136 north	Western end of SH-136 concurrency
Texas	Guymon	80.4	129.4		US 64 east / US 412 Truck east / SH-3 Truck east / SH-136 Truck south (NE 12th Street)	Eastern end of US-64 concurrency; western terminus of US-412 Truck/SH-3 Truck; northern terminus of SH-136 Truck
Texas	Guymon	81.2	130.7		US 54 west (South 2nd Street)	Western end of US-54 concurrency
Texas	Guymon	81.6	131.3		US 412 Truck west / SH-3 Truck west / SH-136 Truck north / US 54 east – Liberal, KS	Eastern end of US-54 concurrency; eastern terminus of US-412 Truck/SH-3 Truck; southern terminus of SH-136 Truck
Texas	Guymon	81.65	131.40		SH-136 south (East Street)	Eastern end of SH-136 concurrency
Texas		96.2	154.8		SH-94 north – Hooker	Southern terminus of SH-94
Beaver	Bryan's Corner	119.2	191.8		US 83 – Liberal, KS, Beaver, Perryton, TX, Turpin	
Beaver	Elmwood	136.1	219.0		US 270 west / SH-23 – Beaver, Booker, TX	Western end of US-270 concurrency
Harper		171.3	275.7		US 283 – Laverne, Shattuck	
Harper	May	179.5	288.9		SH-46 – Buffalo, Gage	
Ellis	No major junctions					
Woodward		188.9	304.0		US 183 north – Buffalo	Western end of US-183 concurrency
Woodward	Woodward	202.8	326.4		SH-15 west (Oklahoma Avenue west)	Eastern terminus of SH-15
Woodward	Woodward	204.9	329.8		US 412 east (Oklahoma Avenue east) / SH-34 north (9th Street north) – Enid	Eastern end of US-412 concurrency; western end of SH-34 concurrency
Woodward		208.7	335.9		SH-34 south – Elk City, Vici	Eastern end of SH-34 concurrency
Woodward		217.5	350.0		SH-50 north – Mooreland	Southern terminus of SH-50
Dewey		236.0	379.8		US 183 south – Taloga, Clinton	Eastern end of US-183 concurrency
Dewey	Seiling	238.1	383.2		US 60 east / US 281 north – Waynoka, Fairview	Northern end of US-60/US-281 concurrency
Dewey	Seiling	238.7	384.2		US 60 west / SH-51 west (Shepherd Street) to US 183 – Vici	Southern end of US-60 concurrency; western end of SH-51 concurrency
Dewey	Hucmac	247.1	397.7		SH-51 east – Canton, Southard	Eastern end of SH-51 concurrency
Blaine		266.9	429.5		SH-33 west / SH-58 north – Canton, Thomas	Western end of SH-33 concurrency; southern terminus of SH-58
Blaine	Watonga	276.5	445.0		US 270 east / US 281 south / SH-8 (Clarence Nash Boulevard) – Okeene, Geary	Eastern end of US-270/US-281 concurrency
Kingfisher	Kingfisher	304.1	489.4		US 81 north (Main Street north) / SH-33 east (Broadway Avenue east)	Eastern end of SH-33 concurrency; western end of US-81 concurrency
Canadian		316.4	509.2		US 81 south – El Reno	Trumpet interchange; eastern end of US-81 concurrency
Canadian	Oklahoma City	329.9	530.9		SH-4 (Piedmont Road) – Piedmont, Yukon	
Canadian	Oklahoma City	333.5	536.7		I-344 Toll (Kilpatrick Turnpike)	Diamond interchange
Oklahoma	Oklahoma City	340.4	547.8		SH-74 north (Lake Hefner Parkway north)	Diamond interchange; west end of freeway section; western end of SH-74 (Lake Hefner Pkwy.) concurrency
Oklahoma	Oklahoma City	341.1	548.9	—	NW 50th Street	
Oklahoma	Oklahoma City	341.9	550.2	123B	SH-66 west – Warr Acres, Bethany	Stack interchange; exit numbers follow I-44
Oklahoma	Oklahoma City	341.9	550.2	—	I-44 east (SH-66 east) / SH-74 end	Stack interchange; I-44 exit 123B; southern terminus of SH-74; Western end of I-44 concurrency
Oklahoma	Oklahoma City	342.4	551.0	123A	NW 36th Street	Westbound exit and eastbound entrance
Oklahoma	Oklahoma City	343.2	552.3	122	NW 23rd Street	
Oklahoma	Oklahoma City	344.2	553.9	121A-B	NW 10th Street – Fair Park	Signed as exits 121B (west) and 121A (east); Fair Park signed westbound only
Oklahoma	Oklahoma City	345.5	556.0	120A-B	I-40 (US 270) – Amarillo, Fort Smith	Full diamond interchange; signed as exits 120B (east) and 120A (west)
Oklahoma	Oklahoma City	346.3	557.3	119	SW 15th Street	
Oklahoma	Oklahoma City	347.3	558.9	118	SW 29th Street	
Oklahoma	Oklahoma City	348.1	560.2	117A	SW 44th Street	Signed as exit 117B northbound
Oklahoma	Oklahoma City	348.6	561.0	116B	I-240 west (Airport Road)	Western end of I-240 concurrency; former SH-152
Oklahoma	Oklahoma City	349.4	562.3	116A	SW 59th Street	
Oklahoma	Oklahoma City	350.0	563.3	1A	I-44 / US 62 west – Lawton	Eastern end of I-44 concurrency; western end of US-62 concurrency; exit number not signed eastbound
Oklahoma	Oklahoma City	see I-240 (mile 10.0–26.8)				
Oklahoma	Oklahoma City	366.8	590.3	—	I-40 west (US 270 west) / I-240 end – Oklahoma City	Eastern terminus of I-240; I-40 exit 165; eastern end of I-240 concurrency; western end of I-40/US-270 concurrency
Oklahoma	Oklahoma City	368.1	592.4	166	Choctaw Road	Exit numbers follow I-40
Oklahoma	Oklahoma City	371.2	597.4	169	Peebly Road	
Oklahoma	Oklahoma City	374.0	601.9	172	Harrah Newalla Road	
Pottawatomie	McLoud	378.1	608.5	176	SH-102 (McLoud Road)	Western end of SH-102 concurrency
Pottawatomie	Dale	380.2	611.9	178	SH-102 – Dale, Bethel Acres	Eastern end of SH-102 concurrency
Pottawatomie	Shawnee	382.9	616.2	181	I-40 / SH-3E east / US 270 / SH-3W east / US 177 – Shawnee, Tecumseh	SH-3 east splits into SH-3W and SH-3E; eastern end of I-40/US-270 concurrency; exit number is for US-177/US-270/SH-3W
See SH-3E and SH-3W
Pontotoc		440.4	708.8	—	SH-1 east / SH-3E (J.A. Richardson Loop) / SH-3W / SH-19 west – Seminole, McAlester, Shawnee, Pauls Valley	West end of freeway section; northern end of SH-1 concurrency; SH-3 west splits into SH-3W and SH-3E
Pontotoc		440.4	708.8	—	Ada	Westbound exit only
Pontotoc		440.9	709.6	—	Reeves Road	Eastbound exit only
Pontotoc		441.3	710.2	—	SH-1 west – Latta, Roff, Sulphur	Southern end of SH-1 concurrency
Pontotoc		442.3	711.8	—	Oak Avenue	Eastbound exit and westbound entrance
Pontotoc		443.4	713.6	—	Kerr Lab Road	
Pontotoc	Ada	444.4	715.2	—	US 377 / SH-99 north – Ada, McAlester	Western end of US-377/SH-99 concurrency; westbound exit and eastbound entrance
Pontotoc	Ada	445.3	716.6	—	Stonecipher Boulevard	
Pontotoc	Ahloso	446.2	718.1	—	US 377 / SH-99 south – Fittstown, Tishomingo, Madill	East end of freeway; eastern end of US-377/SH-99 concurrency
Pontotoc		454.9	732.1		Stonewall	Interchange
Coal		461.5	742.7		SH-48 – Lula, Allen, Tupelo	
Coal		471.1	758.2		US 75 north – Calvin	Western end of US-75 concurrency
Coal	Coalgate	474.9	764.3		SH-31 east (Main Street north)	Northern end of SH-31 concurrency
Coal	Coalgate	475.0	764.4		SH-31 west (Ohio Avenue)	Southern end of SH-31 concurrency
Coal	Coalgate	475.4	765.1		SH-43 east (Lafayette Avenue)	Western terminus of SH-43
Atoka	Atoka				SH-3 Byp. east (Greathouse Drive) – Antlers, Wapanucka	Western terminus of SH-3 Byp.
Atoka	Atoka	488.2	785.7		US 69 north (Mississippi Avenue north) – McAlester, Tulsa	Western end of US-69 concurrency
Atoka	Atoka	489.6	787.9		US 69 south (Mississippi Avenue south) / US 75 south / SH-7 / SH-3 Byp. west (13th Street west) – Tishomingo, Durant	Eastern end of US-69/US-75 concurrency; eastern terminus of SH-3 Byp./SH-7
Pushmataha	Antlers	519.8	836.5		Indian Nation Turnpike – Hugo, Paris, Henryetta, Tulsa	Interchange; Indian Nation Tpk. exit 16
Pushmataha	Antlers	520.5	837.7		SH-2 north – Moyers, Clayton	Southern terminus of SH-2
Pushmataha	Antlers	521.5	839.3		US 271 south – Hugo	Western end of US-271 concurrency
Pushmataha	Antlers	522.4	840.7		US 271 north – Wilburton, Poteau, Clayton	Eastern end of US-271 concurrency
Pushmataha	Rattan	534.2	859.7		SH-93 south – Hugo	Northern terminus of SH-93
Pushmataha	Oleta	538.3	866.3		SH-147 south	Northern terminus of SH-147
McCurtain		565.9	910.7		SH-98 south	Northern terminus of SH-98
McCurtain	Broken Bow	577.0	928.6		US 70 east (Martin Luther King Drive) / US 259 north (Park Drive north) – DeQueen Ark., Beavers Bend	Northern end of US-70/US-259 concurrency
McCurtain	Idabel	584.8	941.1		US 70 Byp. begins / US 70 west – Southeastern Oklahoma State University McCurtain Campus, Hugo	Southern end of US-70 concurrency; northern end of US-70 Byp. concurrency
McCurtain	Idabel	586.7	944.2		US 259 south / US 70 Byp. west	Eastern end of US-259 concurrency; southern end of US-70 Byp. concurrency
McCurtain		615.0	989.7		AR 32 east	Continuation into Arkansas
1.000 mi = 1.609 km; 1.000 km = 0.621 mi: Concurrency terminus; Incomplete access; Tolled; Route transition

=== SH-3E ===
County	Location	mi	km	Exit	Destinations	Notes
Pottawatomie		387.0	622.8	181	I-40 / SH-3 west / SH-3W east / US 177 / US 270 – Stillwater, Tecumseh	Exit numbers follow I-40; eastern end of I-40 concurrency; SH-3E west and SH-3W merge into SH-3
Pottawatomie	Shawnee			185	Kickapoo Street – Shawnee	
Pottawatomie	Shawnee	389.7	627.2		I-40 east / SH-18 north – Meeker	Western end of SH-18 concurrency; I-40 exit 186
Pottawatomie	Shawnee	391.7	630.4		SH-18 south (Harrison Street south)	Eastern end of SH-18 concurrency
Pottawatomie	Earlsboro	397.6	639.9		SH-9A to I-40 – Earlsboro	
Pottawatomie		398.9	642.0		SH-99A east	Western terminus of SH-99A
Seminole	Seminole	406.5	654.2		US 270 west / SH-9 – Eufaula, Norman	Western end of US-270 concurrency
Seminole	Seminole	408.9	658.1		US 270 east (Broadway Avenue east) / US 377 / SH-99 north (Milt Phillips Avenue north)	eastern end of US-270 concurrency, western end of US-377/SH-99 concurrency
Seminole	Seminole	411.4	662.1		SH-59 west – Maud	Western end of SH-59 concurrency
Seminole	Bowlegs	414.1	666.4		SH-59 east – Bowlegs, Wewoka	Eastern end of SH-59 concurrency
Seminole		428.5	689.6		SH-39 west (Broadway Street) / SH-56 east – Wewoka, Konawa	Eastern terminus of SH-39; western terminus of SH-56
Canadian River					Haney-Abbott Bridge	
Pontotoc	Ada	439.4	707.1	—	US 377 / SH-99 south / SH-1 east – Agri-Plex, Ada, McAlester	West end of freeway; eastern end of US-377/SH-99 concurrency, western end of SH-1 concurrency
Pontotoc		440.4	708.8	—	SH-3W / SH-19 west – Shawnee	Eastbound exit and westbound entrance; eastern terminus of SH-19
Pontotoc		440.4	708.8	—	Ada	Eastbound exit and westbound entrance
Pontotoc		440.4	708.8	—	SH-3 east / SH-1 (J.A. Richardson Loop)	SH-3E east and SH-3W merge into SH-3
1.000 mi = 1.609 km; 1.000 km = 0.621 mi: Concurrency terminus; Incomplete access; Route transition

=== SH-3W ===
County	Location	mi	km	Destinations	Notes
Pottawatomie				I-40 / SH-3 west (US 270 west) – Oklahoma City	Interchange; SH-3W west and SH-3E merge into SH-3; western end of US-270 concurrency; I-40 exit 181
Pottawatomie				I-40 east (SH-3E east) – Okemah	Interchange; westbound exit and eastbound entrance; I-40 exit 181
Pottawatomie				US 177 north to SH-270	Interchange; left entrance eastbound, left exits; western end of US-177 concurrency
Pottawatomie	Shawnee	387.3	623.3	US 270 Bus. east (Kickapoo Spur)	Interchange; western terminus of US-270 Bus.
Pottawatomie	Shawnee	388.8	625.7	US 270 Bus. west / SH-18 north (Farrall Avenue)	Interchange; southern terminus of SH-18, eastern terminus of US-270 Bus.
Pottawatomie	Tecumseh	392.4	631.5	Tecumseh	Interchange
Pottawatomie	Tecumseh	394.6	635.0	US 270 east / SH-9 – Tecumseh, Seminole	Eastbound exit split into "US-270 / SH-9 east – Seminole" and "SH-9 west – Tecumseh"; eastern end of US-270 concurrency
Pottawatomie	Chisney	401.4	646.0	SH-59B west – Macomb	Eastern terminus of SH-59B
Pottawatomie	Pearson	406.4	654.0	SH-59 east – Pearson, St. Louis	Northern end of SH-59 concurrency
Pottawatomie	Asher	412.4	663.7	SH-39 – Konawa, Lexington, Purcell	
Canadian River				Pottawatomie–Pontotoc county line	
Pontotoc–McClain county line		415.1	668.0	US 177 south / SH-59 west – Stratford, Sulphur	Southern end of US-177/SH-59 concurrency
Pontotoc		421.0	677.5	SH-59A west	Eastern terminus of SH-59A
Pontotoc		431.9	695.1	SH-19 west – Stratford, Pauls Valley	Interchange
Pontotoc		433.4	697.5	SH-3E west / SH-1 (J.A. Richardson Loop) / Main Street – McAlester, Seminole, Ada	Interchange; eastbound left exit and westbound entrance (left entrance from Main St.)
Pontotoc		433.4	697.5	SH-3 east / SH-1 (J.A. Richardson Loop) / SH-19 end – Roff, Coalgate	Interchange; SH-3W east and SH-3E merge into SH-3; eastern terminus of SH-19
1.000 mi = 1.609 km; 1.000 km = 0.621 mi: Concurrency terminus; Incomplete access; Route transition
