= Four Corners, Texas County, Oklahoma =

Unincorporated community in Oklahoma, US

Coordinates: 36°45′43″N 101°54′25″W

Location of Four Corners within Texas County, Oklahoma

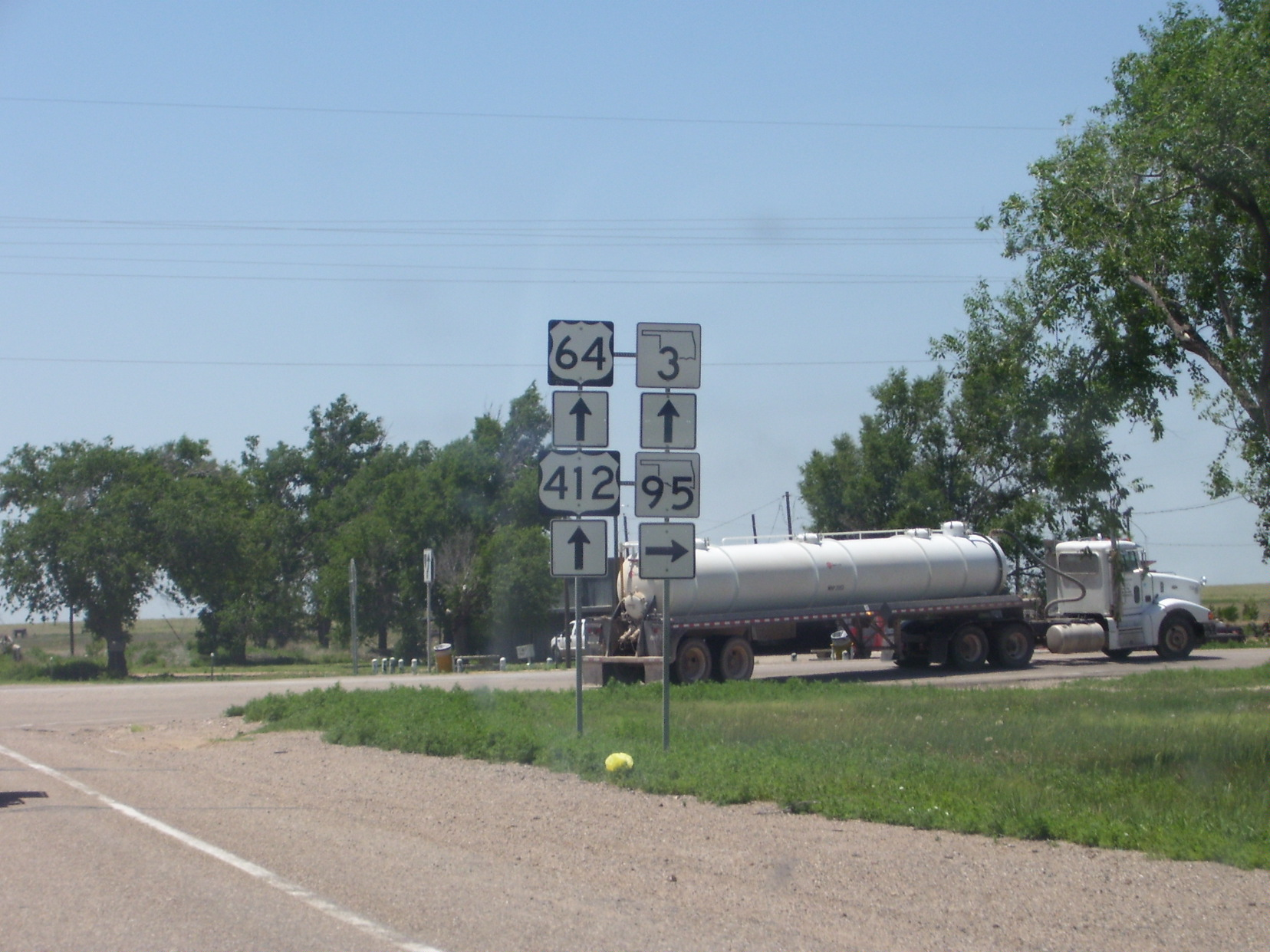
Highway intersection at Four Corners

Four Corners is an unincorporated community in western Texas County, Oklahoma, United States. It is located at the western US-64/412/State Highway 3 - SH-95 junction in the Oklahoma Panhandle. Eva is two miles to the north and Guymon is located 22 miles to the east-southeast.
