= Oklahoma State Highway 171 =

State highway in Oklahoma, United States

State Highway 171
- SH-171 highlighted in red

Route information
- Maintained by ODOT
- Length: 21.47 mi (34.55 km)
- Existed: ca. 1974–present

Major junctions
- South end: US 287 northeast of Kerrick, TX
- US 64 / US 412 / SH-3 near Keyes
- North end: US 56 in Keyes

Location
- Country: United States
- State: Oklahoma

Highway system
- Oklahoma State Highway System; Interstate; US; State; Turnpikes
← US 169	→ US 177

State Highway 171, abbreviated as SH-171, is a state highway in Cimarron County, Oklahoma, in the Oklahoma Panhandle. It runs for 21.47 miles (34.55 km) north and south through the eastern part of the county, connecting U.S. Highway 287 near the Oklahoma-Texas state line to US-56 in Keyes. The only other highway it intersects with is US-64/412/SH-3, three miles (5 km) south of Keyes. SH-171 has no lettered spur routes.

SH-171 was established circa 1974 with its present-day routing and termini, and may have initially been numbered SH-170. It had assumed its current number by 1976.

== Route description ==
State Highway 171 begins at US-287 near Kerrick, Texas, 0.3 miles (0.48 km) northwest of the Texas state line. From the southern terminus, SH-171 heads due north. Approximately five miles (8.0 km) north of the terminus, SH-171 crosses the intermittent Beaver River (a local name for the North Canadian River). As the route continues north, it passes to the east of two intermittent lakes, Ritner Lake and Sampsel Lake. The highway then comes to a junction with US-64, US-412, and SH-3; the three highways head toward Boise City to the west and Guymon to the east. SH-171 continues north, passing along the eastern edge of the town of Keyes. The route then comes to an end at US-56.

== History ==
The route of the present-day SH-171 was first shown as a state highway on the 1975 official state map, implying its creation in 1974. On this edition of the map only, it is shown as State Highway 170. By 1976, it was shown as SH-171. The route has always been paved, and follows the same routing that it did in 1974.

== Junction list ==
The entire route is in Cimarron County.

Location	mi	km	Destinations	Notes
	0.0	0.0	US 287 (President Donald J. Trump Highway) – Stratford TX, Boise City	Southern terminus
	17.9	28.8	US 64 / US 412 / SH-3 – Guymon, Boise City	
Keyes	21.4	34.4	US 56 – Elkhart, Boise City	Northern terminus; former SH-114
1.000 mi = 1.609 km; 1.000 km = 0.621 mi
