= Leach, Oklahoma =

- Census-designated place
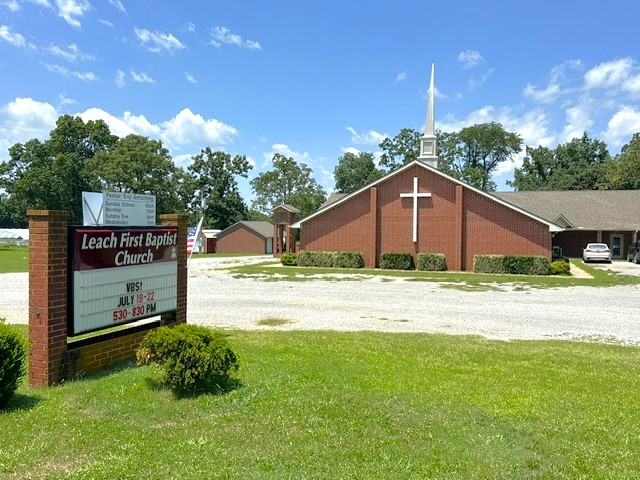
- Leach First Baptist Church in July of 2026

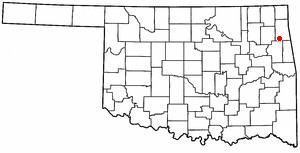
- Location of Leach, Oklahoma
- Coordinates: 36°11′52″N 94°54′36″W
- Country: United States
- State: Oklahoma
- County: Delaware

Area
  - Total: 5.75 sq mi (14.89 km^{2})
  - Land: 5.75 sq mi (14.89 km^{2})
  - Water: 0 sq mi (0.00 km^{2})
- Elevation: 1,139 ft (347 m)

Population (2020)
  - Total: 249
  - Density: 43.3/sq mi (16.72/km^{2})
- Time zone: UTC-6 (Central (CST))
  - Summer (DST): UTC-5 (CDT)
- FIPS code: 40-41900
- GNIS feature ID: 2408592

Leach is an unincorporated community and census-designated place (CDP) in southwestern Delaware County, Oklahoma, United States, along U.S. Route 412 and 412 Alternate. As of the 2020 census, Leach had a population of 249.

== History ==
The locale started under the name of Ulm, changing to Leach on February 20, 1897, and appearing under the latter name in a 1911 Rand-McNally map of the county. The community has the name of J. R. Leach, an early settler.

On May 20, 2019, a nocturnal EF2 tornado was reported to have caused extensive damage in the vicinity of Leach.

== Geography ==
Leach is located in southwestern Delaware County and is 7 miles (11 km) west of the town of Kansas and 16 miles (26 km) east of Locust Grove.

According to the United States Census Bureau, the Leach CDP has a total area of 5.8 square miles (14.9 km^{2}), all land.

== Demographics ==
Historical population
Census	Pop.	Note	%±
2020	249		—
U.S. Decennial Census

=== 2020 census ===
As of the 2020 census, Leach had a population of 249. The median age was 42.5 years. 22.1% of residents were under the age of 18 and 19.7% of residents were 65 years of age or older. For every 100 females there were 137.1 males, and for every 100 females age 18 and over there were 142.5 males age 18 and over.

0.0% of residents lived in urban areas, while 100.0% lived in rural areas.

There were 86 households in Leach, of which 31.4% had children under the age of 18 living in them. Of all households, 44.2% were married-couple households, 20.9% were households with a male householder and no spouse or partner present, and 26.7% were households with a female householder and no spouse or partner present. About 29.0% of all households were made up of individuals and 12.8% had someone living alone who was 65 years of age or older.

There were 100 housing units, of which 14.0% were vacant. The homeowner vacancy rate was 0.0% and the rental vacancy rate was 13.6%.

Racial composition as of the 2020 census
Race	Number	Percent
White	82	32.9%
Black or African American	2	0.8%
American Indian and Alaska Native	91	36.5%
Asian	19	7.6%
Native Hawaiian and Other Pacific Islander	0	0.0%
Some other race	13	5.2%
Two or more races	42	16.9%
Hispanic or Latino (of any race)	8	3.2%

=== 2000 census ===
As of the census of 2000, there were 220 people, 81 households, and 66 families residing in the CDP. The population density was 35.3 inhabitants per square mile (13.6/km^{2}). There were 94 housing units at an average density of 15.1/sq mi (5.8/km^{2}). The racial makeup of the CDP was 48.64% White, 40.45% Native American, and 10.91% from two or more races. Hispanic or Latino of any race were 1.36% of the population.

There were 81 households, out of which 38.3% had children under the age of 18 living with them, 67.9% were married couples living together, 9.9% had a female householder with no husband present, and 17.3% were non-families. 16.0% of all households were made up of individuals, and 3.7% had someone living alone who was 65 years of age or older. The average household size was 2.72 and the average family size was 2.99.

In the CDP, the population was spread out, with 28.6% under the age of 18, 8.2% from 18 to 24, 26.4% from 25 to 44, 26.4% from 45 to 64, and 10.5% who were 65 years of age or older. The median age was 32 years. For every 100 females, there were 103.7 males. For every 100 females age 18 and over, there were 109.3 males.

The median income for a household in the CDP was $30,972, and the median income for a family was $31,964. Males had a median income of $23,646 versus $24,375 for females. The per capita income for the CDP was $11,119. About 17.3% of families and 18.3% of the population were below the poverty line, including 16.9% of those under the age of eighteen and 30.0% of those 65 or over.

== Education ==
It is in the Leach Public School school district.
