= Oklahoma State Highway 94 =

State highway in Oklahoma, United States

State Highway 94

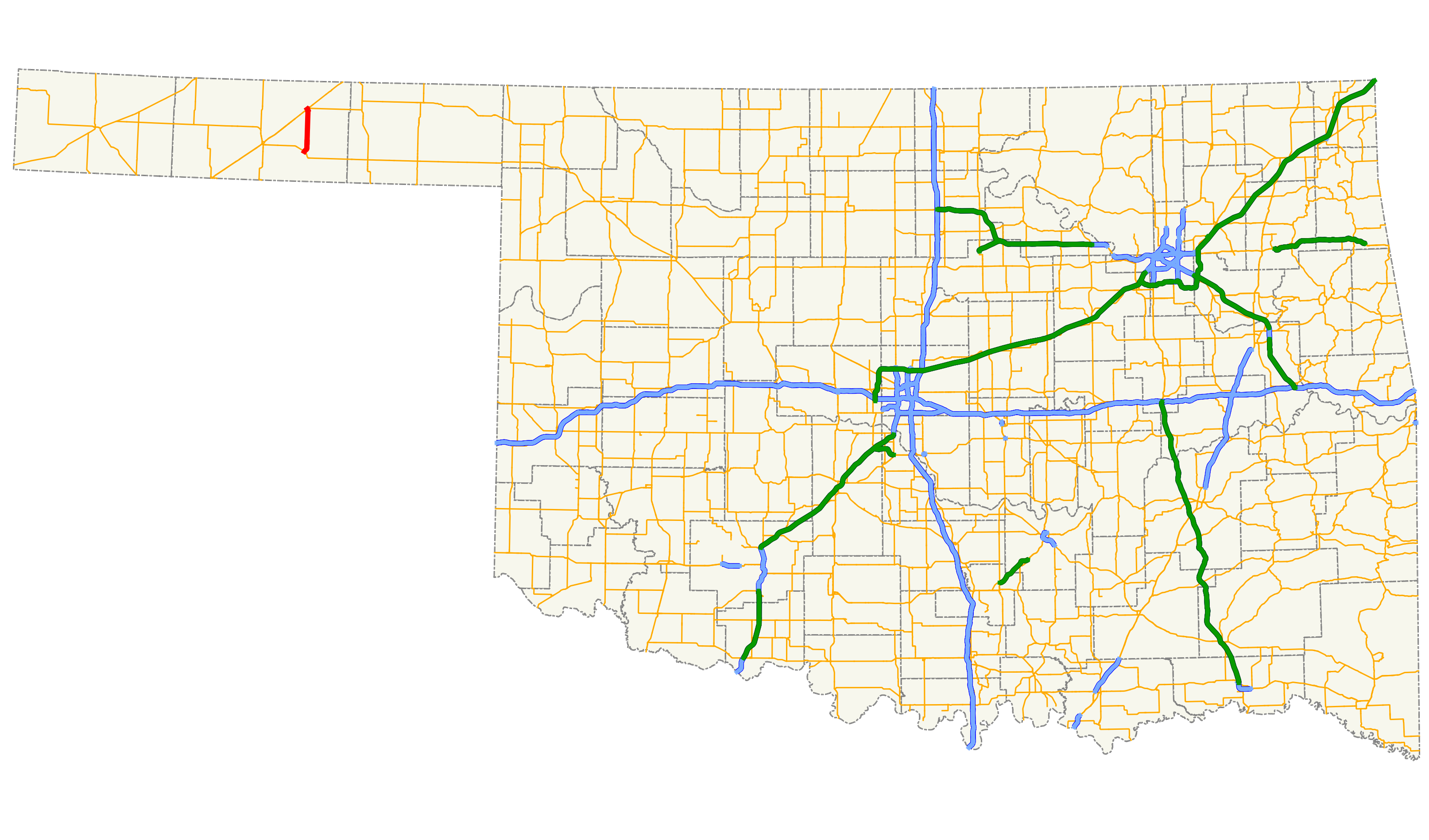

Route information
- Maintained by ODOT
- Length: 14.92 mi (24.01 km)
- Existed: ca. 1943–present

Major junctions
- South end: US 412 / SH-3 northwest of Hardesty
- North end: US 54 / US 64 in Hooker

Location
- Country: United States
- State: Oklahoma

Highway system
- Oklahoma State Highway System; Interstate; US; State; Turnpikes
← SH-93	→ SH-95

State Highway 94 (abbreviated SH-94 or OK-94) is a state highway in the Oklahoma panhandle. It runs north–south through Texas County for a total of 14.92 miles (24.01 km). It has no lettered spur routes. The highway was commissioned around 1943 as a dirt road and was upgraded to gravel, and later, pavement throughout the 1950s.

== Route description ==
SH-94 begins at US-412/SH-3 three miles (5 km) northwest of Hardesty. SH-94 briefly passes through the Optima National Wildlife Refuge while crossing the Beaver River (which is dammed downstream to form Optima Lake). The highway is mostly straight and level for its entire length. It ends in Hooker at U.S. Highway 54/64.

== History ==
State Highway 94 first appears on the June 1944 state highway map, implying it was first commissioned sometime during 1943 or the first half of 1944. At this time, the highway had the same termini and routing as it does today, but was entirely dirt. In 1949, it was upgraded to gravel. In 1956, the road was wholly paved. No further changes other than routine maintenance have occurred since then.

== Junction list ==
County	Location	mi	km	Destinations	Notes
Texas		0.00	0.00	US 412 / SH-3	Southern terminus
Texas	Hooker	14.92	24.01	US 54 / US 64	Northern terminus
1.000 mi = 1.609 km; 1.000 km = 0.621 mi
