= Oklahoma State Highway 50 =

State highway in Oklahoma, United States

State Highway 50

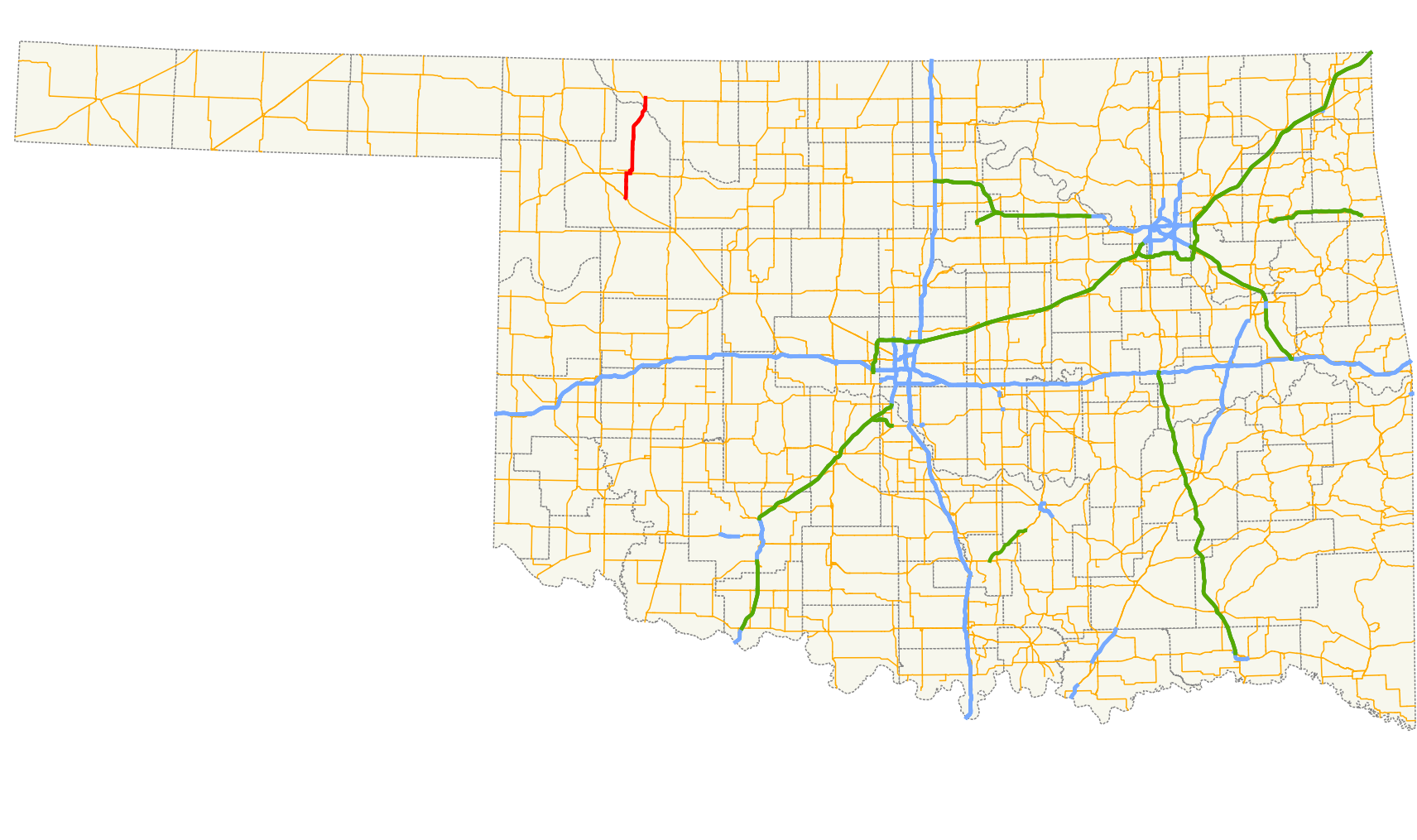

Route information
- Maintained by ODOT
- Length: 37.7 mi (60.7 km)

Major junctions
- South end: US 183 / US 270 / SH-3 southwest of Woodward
- US 412 in Mooreland
- North end: US 64 north of Freedom

Location
- Country: United States
- State: Oklahoma

Highway system
- Oklahoma State Highway System; Interstate; US; State; Turnpikes
← SH-49	→ SH-51

State Highway 50 (abbreviated SH-50) is a state highway in northwestern Oklahoma. The majority of the 37.7-mile (60.7 km) highway is in Woodward County, though the northernmost three miles (4.8 km) are in Woods County. SH-50 runs near two state parks and has a lettered spur that goes to each of them.

== Route description ==
State Highway 50 begins at US-183/270/SH-3 between Woodward and Seiling. Much of the first section of highway runs through the Moscow Flats area west of the North Canadian River. The highway crosses Indian Creek, a tributary of the North Canadian, before crossing the river itself. SH-50 intersects US-412 between Woodward and Mooreland. SH-50 turns east and overlaps US-412 to Mooreland.

Upon reaching Mooreland, SH-50 splits off to the north. On the northern outskirts of town, SH-50 intersects one of its spur routes, SH-50B, which connects Mooreland to Boiling Springs State Park. SH-50 briefly turns east, continuing the alignment of SH-50B, before turning back north again. SH-50 follows a due north heading in this area, paralleling Long Creek and crossing many of the intermittent streams that feed it. The road then turns northeast toward Alabaster Caverns State Park. As the highway approaches the park, it spawns a spur leading into the park, SH-50A, before continuing northeast, clipping the northwest corner of the park boundary. The road then gradually eases into a more northerly heading as it approaches the Cimarron River.

SH-50 bridges the Cimarron River south of Freedom, in the process leaving Woodward County and entering Woods County. The road then passes through the west side of Freedom. After leaving the town, the road continues due north to its junction with US-64, where it terminates.

== History ==
State Highway 50 was first commissioned on March 2, 1927, running from State Highway 47 in Mooreland (later SH-15, present-day US-412) to US-64 and the original State Highway 1 north of Freedom. Between January 1, 1929, and March 1, 1930, the highway was extended west along US-64, then north along a segment of old SH-1, passing through Lookout and ending at the Kansas state line. On November 1, 1954, State Highway 34 was extended to follow SH-50 in concurrency north of US-64.

SH-50 underwent a major realignment on October 6, 1958, bypassing a gravel section with a straighter paved route. At the same time, SH-50A was established to connect the new road to Alabaster Caverns. Around this time, SH-34C, formerly a continuous highway linking SH-34 to Boiling Springs State Park and onward to SH-50, was split into two highways, with the middle section through the park being decommissioned. The section of highway east of the park was renumbered to SH-50B.

Also occurring on October 6, 1958, was the southern extension of SH-50, starting at US-183/270/SH-3, continuing north to SH-15, and continuing east along SH-15 to Mooreland, where it linked up with existing SH-50. The extension would not be shown on state highway maps until the 1960 edition, however.

The highway was at its greatest extent from 1958 to 1964, when it started at its present-day southern terminus and continued all the way north to the Kansas state line. However, virtually all of the highway north of Freedom was concurrent with another route. On November 9, 1964, SH-50 was truncated to end at its present-day northern terminus at US-64.

In the early 1980s, a new bridge was built across the Cimarron River south of Freedom. SH-50 was realigned to use this new crossing on April 6, 1981. No changes have occurred to the highway since then.

== Spurs ==
SH-50 has two lettered spurs. They each run to a state park.

=== SH-50A ===
State Highway 50A
- Location: Woodward County
- Length: 0.54 mi (870 m)

SH-50A connects SH-50 to Alabaster Caverns State Park near Freedom.

=== SH-50B ===
State Highway 50B
- Location: Woodward County
- Length: 4.56 mi (7.34 km)

SH-50B connects SH-50 to Boiling Springs State Park near Mooreland.

== Junction list ==
County	Location	mi	km	Destinations	Notes
Woodward		0.0	0.0	US 183 / US 270 / SH-3	Southern terminus
Woodward		8.5	13.7	US 412	US-412 joins northbound and splits southbound
Woodward	Mooreland	9.8	15.8	US 412	US-412 joins southbound and splits northbound
Woodward		10.9	17.5	SH-50B	Eastern terminus of SH-50B
Woodward		29.0	46.7	SH-50A	Western terminus of SH-50A
Woods		37.7	60.7	US 64	Northern terminus
1.000 mi = 1.609 km; 1.000 km = 0.621 mi: Concurrency terminus
