= Duke Cook =

American gridiron football player (1933–2005)

Profile
- Positions: Center, Linebacker

Personal information
- Born: January 22, 1933; Mooreland, Oklahoma, U.S.
- Died: April 10, 2005 (aged 72); Oklahoma, U.S.
- Listed height: 6 ft 2 in (1.88 m)
- Listed weight: 210 lb (95 kg)

Career history
- 1956: Calgary Stampeders

Hubert (Duke) Cook (January 22, 1933 – April 10, 2005) was an American professional football player who played for the Calgary Stampeders. He played college football at Trinity University and Oklahoma State University. He lived in Oklahoma City.
