= U.S. Route 287 in Oklahoma =

Segment of American highway

U.S. Highway 287
- US 287 highlighted in red

Route information
- Maintained by ODOT
- Length: 40.8 mi (65.7 km)

Major junctions
- South end: US 287 at the Texas state line near Kerrick, TX
- US 56 / US 64 / US 412 in Boise City; US 385 in Boise City
- North end: US 287 / US 385 at the Colorado state line near Campo, CO

Location
- Country: United States
- State: Oklahoma
- Counties: Cimarron

Highway system
- United States Numbered Highway System; List; Special; Divided; Oklahoma State Highway System; Interstate; US; State; Turnpikes
| ← US 283 | → SH-325 |

U.S. Route 287 (US-287) is a north–south highway that starts at the Texas state line north of Kerrick, Texas, and ends at the Colorado state line south of Campo, Colorado.

== Route description ==
In Oklahoma, US-287 remains within Cimarron County, located at the end of the Panhandle. After crossing the state line north of Kerrick, Texas, the highway intersects State Highway 171 (SH-171) at its southern terminus. US-287 continues northwest, crossing the Beaver River, toward Boise City. On the east side of town, the highway crosses US-56, US-64, US-412, and SH-3. After about 1.6 miles (2.6 km), the highway forms a concurrency with US-385 and SH-3. These three highways head north to the Colorado state line. SH-3 ends there, while US-287 and US-385 continue onward into Colorado.

== History ==
On May 28, 2021, Oklahoma governor Kevin Stitt signed legislation designating a roughly 20-mile portion of U.S. 287 between Boise City and the Oklahoma-Texas border as the President Donald J. Trump Highway, effective as of November 1.

== Junction list ==
The entire route is in Cimarron County.

| Location | mi | km | Destinations | Notes |
|---|---|---|---|---|
| | 0.00 | 0.00 | US 287 south – Stratford, Amarillo | Continuation into Texas |
| | 0.3 | 0.48 | SH-171 north | |
| Boise City | 20.6– 21.5 | 33.2– 34.6 | US 412 / SH-3 (US 56 / US 64) – Boise City, Guymon | Interchange |
| Boise City | 23.1 | 37.2 | US 385 south / SH-3 east – Boise City | Southern end of US-385/SH-3 concurrency |
| | 40.8 | 65.7 | SH-3 ends / US 287 north / US 385 north – Lamar, Denver | Northern end of SH-3 concurrency; continuation into Colorado |
1.000 mi = 1.609 km; 1.000 km = 0.621 mi: Concurrency terminus

U.S. Route 287
| Previous state: Texas | Oklahoma | Next state: Colorado |
