= Flint Creek, Oklahoma =

- Census-designated place
- Location within the state of Oklahoma
- Coordinates: 36°10′35″N 94°44′37″W
- Country: United States
- State: Oklahoma
- County: Delaware

Area
  - Total: 6.37 sq mi (16.49 km^{2})
  - Land: 6.37 sq mi (16.49 km^{2})
  - Water: 0 sq mi (0.00 km^{2})
- Elevation: 1,171 ft (357 m)

Population (2020)
  - Total: 741
  - Density: 116.4/sq mi (44.93/km^{2})
- Time zone: UTC-6 (Central (CST))
  - Summer (DST): UTC-5 (CST)
- FIPS code: 40-26415
- GNIS feature ID: 2408215

Flint Creek is an unincorporated area and census-designated place (CDP) in Delaware County, Oklahoma, United States. As of the 2020 census, Flint Creek had a population of 741.

== Geography ==
Flint Creek is located along the southern border of Delaware County with Adair County to the south. The Illinois River and Flint Creek form the southeastern boundary of the CDP, U.S. Route 59 forms the northeastern edge, Five Mile Hollow Road forms part of the northern edge, and Oklahoma State Highway 10 forms the western extent of the CDP. Flint Creek is 5 miles (8 km) southeast of the town of Kansas.

According to the United States Census Bureau, the CDP has a total area of 6.4 square miles (16.6 km^{2}), all land.

== Demographics ==
Historical population
Census	Pop.	Note	%±
2020	741		—
U.S. Decennial Census

=== 2020 census ===
As of the 2020 census, Flint Creek had a population of 741. The median age was 44.4 years. 21.3% of residents were under the age of 18 and 17.4% of residents were 65 years of age or older. For every 100 females there were 93.5 males, and for every 100 females age 18 and over there were 95.6 males age 18 and over.

0.0% of residents lived in urban areas, while 100.0% lived in rural areas.

There were 289 households in Flint Creek, of which 26.0% had children under the age of 18 living in them. Of all households, 54.3% were married-couple households, 22.5% were households with a male householder and no spouse or partner present, and 19.0% were households with a female householder and no spouse or partner present. About 29.1% of all households were made up of individuals and 16.0% had someone living alone who was 65 years of age or older.

There were 435 housing units, of which 33.6% were vacant. The homeowner vacancy rate was 6.8% and the rental vacancy rate was 0.0%.

Racial composition as of the 2020 census
Race	Number	Percent
White	469	63.3%
Black or African American	3	0.4%
American Indian and Alaska Native	130	17.5%
Asian	4	0.5%
Native Hawaiian and Other Pacific Islander	0	0.0%
Some other race	4	0.5%
Two or more races	131	17.7%
Hispanic or Latino (of any race)	25	3.4%

=== 2000 census ===
As of the census of 2000, there were 580 people, 217 households, and 182 families residing in the CDP. The population density was 91.7 inhabitants per square mile (35.4/km^{2}). There were 326 housing units at an average density of 51.5 per square mile (19.9/km^{2}). The racial makeup of the CDP was 84.14% White, 0.17% African American, 11.72% Native American, and 3.97% from two or more races. Hispanic or Latino of any race were 0.86% of the population.

There were 217 households, out of which 30.9% had children under the age of 18 living with them, 72.4% were married couples living together, 6.9% had a female householder with no husband present, and 16.1% were non-families. 12.9% of all households were made up of individuals, and 2.3% had someone living alone who was 65 years of age or older. The average household size was 2.67 and the average family size was 2.88.

In the CDP, the population was spread out, with 25.7% under the age of 18, 7.1% from 18 to 24, 28.4% from 25 to 44, 25.5% from 45 to 64, and 13.3% who were 65 years of age or older. The median age was 37 years. For every 100 females, there were 110.1 males. For every 100 females age 18 and over, there were 111.3 males.

The median income for a household in the CDP was $30,781, and the median income for a family was $33,438. Males had a median income of $23,750 versus $17,917 for females. The per capita income for the CDP was $15,457. About 12.1% of families and 11.7% of the population were below the poverty line, including 13.3% of those under age 18 and 18.7% of those age 65 or over.

== Education ==
It is in the Kansas Public Schools school district.
