= Keyes, Oklahoma =

Town in Oklahoma, US

- Town
- Location within Cimarron County and Oklahoma
- Coordinates: 36°48′27″N 102°15′7″W
- Country: United States
- State: Oklahoma
- County: Cimarron

Area
  - Total: 0.36 sq mi (0.93 km^{2})
  - Land: 0.36 sq mi (0.93 km^{2})
  - Water: 0 sq mi (0.00 km^{2})
- Elevation: 3,944 ft (1,202 m)

Population (2020)
  - Total: 276
  - Density: 770/sq mi (300/km^{2})
- Time zone: UTC-6 (Central (CST))
  - Summer (DST): UTC-5 (CDT)
- ZIP Code: 73947
- Area code: 580
- FIPS code: 40-39600
- GNIS ID: 1094354

Keyes is a town in Cimarron County, Oklahoma, United States. As of the 2020 census, the town’s population was 276.

== History ==
Keyes was established in 1925 by the Elkhart and Santa Fe Railway (both leased to and a wholly owned subsidiary of the Atchison, Topeka and Santa Fe Railway). The company named the town after a deceased railroad engineer. The line is now part of the Cimarron Valley Railroad.

Keyes was also the final destination of the Beaver, Meade and Englewood Railroad, which reached town from the east on June 25, 1931. That line was abandoned in 1972.

== Geography ==
Keyes is located at 36°48′30″N 102°15′00″W.

According to the United States Census Bureau, the town has a total area of 0.4 square miles (1.0 km^{2}), all land.

Keyes is at the intersection of U.S. Route 56 and the northern terminus of Oklahoma State Highway 171. Keyes is approximately 16 miles northeast of the Cimarron County seat, Boise City, and about 26 miles southwest of Elkhart, Kansas.

The closest major airport is Liberal Mid-America Regional Airport, about 91 miles.

== Demographics ==
Historical population
Census	Pop.	Note	%±
1930	350		—
1940	227		−35.1%
1950	431		89.9%
1960	627		45.5%
1970	569		−9.3%
1980	557		−2.1%
1990	454		−18.5%
2000	410		−9.7%
2010	324		−21.0%
2020	276		−14.8%
U.S. Decennial Census

=== 2020 census ===
As of the 2020 census, Keyes had a population of 276. The median age was 50.5 years. 20.7% of residents were under the age of 18 and 25.4% of residents were 65 years of age or older. For every 100 females there were 110.7 males, and for every 100 females age 18 and over there were 102.8 males age 18 and over.

0.0% of residents lived in urban areas, while 100.0% lived in rural areas.

There were 128 households in Keyes, of which 29.7% had children under the age of 18 living in them. Of all households, 43.0% were married-couple households, 25.8% were households with a male householder and no spouse or partner present, and 25.8% were households with a female householder and no spouse or partner present. About 27.4% of all households were made up of individuals and 16.4% had someone living alone who was 65 years of age or older.

There were 179 housing units, of which 28.5% were vacant. The homeowner vacancy rate was 0.0% and the rental vacancy rate was 17.0%.

Racial composition as of the 2020 census
Race	Number	Percent
White	229	83.0%
Black or African American	0	0.0%
American Indian and Alaska Native	0	0.0%
Asian	0	0.0%
Native Hawaiian and Other Pacific Islander	0	0.0%
Some other race	27	9.8%
Two or more races	20	7.2%
Hispanic or Latino (of any race)	42	15.2%

=== 2010 census ===
As of the 2010 United States census, there were 324 people, 131 households, and 88 families residing in the town. There were 234 housing units. The racial makeup of the town was 94.1% White, 0.6% Native American, 0.3% Asian, 2.8% from other races, and 2.2% from two or more races. Hispanic or Latino of any race were 14.2% of the population.

There were 131 households, out of which 30.5% had children under the age of 18 living with them, 67.2% were married couples living together, 6.1% had a female householder with no husband present, and 32.8% were non-families. 29.8% of all households were made up of individuals, and 16.8% had someone living alone who was 65 years of age or older. The average household size was 2.47 and the average family size was 3.08.

In the town, the population was spread out, with 26.2% under the age of 18, 6.8% from 18 to 24, 19.8% from 25 to 44, 26.5% from 45 to 64, and 20.7% who were 65 years of age or older. The median age was 43.0 years. For every 100 females, there were 101.2 males, and for every 100 females age 18 and over, there were 99.2 males.

=== Income and poverty ===
According to the 2013 American Community Survey, The median income for a household in the town was $36,827, and the median income for a family was $62,639. Males had a median income of $36,750 versus $40,833 for females. The per capita income for the town was $22,522. About 8.1% of families and 23.2% of the population were below the poverty line, including 53.5% of those under age 18 and 0.0% of those age 65 or over.

== Economy ==
The town's location in the Hugoton Friedrich Basin makes it an ideal source for helium production from natural gas. A helium plant was built near Keyes in 1958. 169,000 million cubic feet (4.8×10^{9} m^{3}) of liquid helium is produced annually by the Keyes Helium Company.

== Transportation ==
U.S. Route 56 highway runs along the north side of Keyes.

== Education ==
The school district is Keyes Public Schools.

== Notable people ==
- Jack Hoxie (1885–1965), rodeo cowboy, Hollywood silent movie cowboy actor
