= Kansas, Oklahoma =

- Town
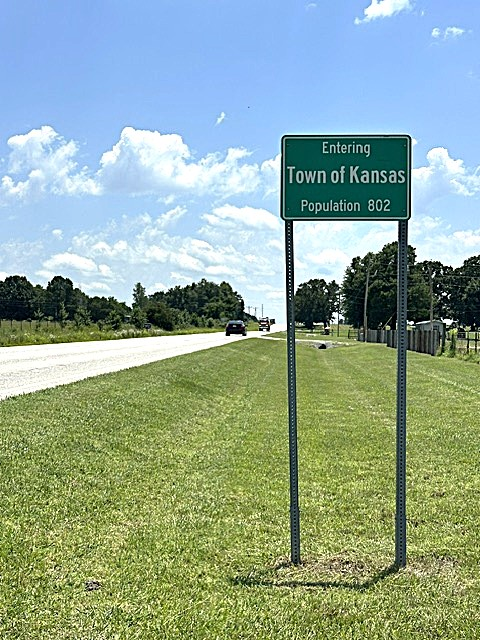
- Kansas, Oklahoma boundary sign, 7-2026

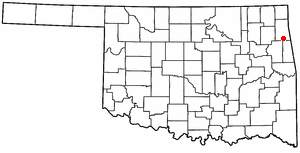
- Location in Oklahoma
- Coordinates: 36°12′19″N 94°47′20″W
- Country: United States
- State: Oklahoma
- County: Delaware

Area
  - Total: 2.04 sq mi (5.28 km^{2})
  - Land: 2.04 sq mi (5.28 km^{2})
  - Water: 0 sq mi (0.00 km^{2})
- Elevation: 1,148 ft (350 m)

Population (2020)
  - Total: 711
  - Density: 348.5/sq mi (134.57/km^{2})
- Time zone: UTC-6 (Central (CST))
  - Summer (DST): UTC-5 (CDT)
- ZIP Code: 74347
- Area codes: 539/918
- FIPS code: 40-38600
- GNIS feature ID: 2412816
- Website: www.kansasok.net

Kansas is a town in Delaware County, Oklahoma, United States. The population was 711 at the 2020 census and an estimated 744 in 2023.

== Geography ==
Kansas is located in southern Delaware County. Spring Creek flows through the town.

Oklahoma State Highway 10 passes through the town.

According to the U.S. Census Bureau, the town of Kansas has a total area of 2.04 square miles (5.28 km^{2}), all land.

=== Climate ===
Climate data for Kansas, Oklahoma
Month	Jan	Feb	Mar	Apr	May	Jun	Jul	Aug	Sep	Oct	Nov	Dec	Year
Mean daily maximum °F (°C)	46.8 (8.2)	52.2 (11.2)	62 (17)	72.3 (22.4)	78.1 (25.6)	85.2 (29.6)	91.3 (32.9)	90.6 (32.6)	82.7 (28.2)	73.2 (22.9)	60.4 (15.8)	49.8 (9.9)	70.4 (21.3)
Mean daily minimum °F (°C)	25.2 (−3.8)	29.7 (−1.3)	38.8 (3.8)	48.6 (9.2)	56.2 (13.4)	64.1 (17.8)	68.4 (20.2)	67.2 (19.6)	60.5 (15.8)	49.6 (9.8)	39.1 (3.9)	29.1 (−1.6)	48 (9)
Average precipitation inches (mm)	2.2 (56)	2.3 (58)	4.2 (110)	4.3 (110)	5.4 (140)	5 (130)	2.6 (66)	3.8 (97)	5.4 (140)	4.1 (100)	3.9 (99)	3.2 (81)	46.4 (1,180)
Source 1: weather.com
Source 2: Weatherbase.com

== Demographics ==
Historical population
Census	Pop.	Note	%±
1920	154		—
1930	163		5.8%
1970	317		—
1980	491		54.9%
1990	556		13.2%
2000	685		23.2%
2010	802		17.1%
2020	711		−11.3%
U.S. Decennial Census

=== 2020 census ===
As of the 2020 census, Kansas had a population of 711. The median age was 37.3 years. 24.9% of residents were under the age of 18 and 15.5% of residents were 65 years of age or older. For every 100 females there were 88.1 males, and for every 100 females age 18 and over there were 85.4 males age 18 and over.

0.0% of residents lived in urban areas, while 100.0% lived in rural areas.

There were 243 households in Kansas, of which 40.3% had children under the age of 18 living in them. Of all households, 45.3% were married-couple households, 16.0% were households with a male householder and no spouse or partner present, and 30.5% were households with a female householder and no spouse or partner present. About 17.7% of all households were made up of individuals and 7.0% had someone living alone who was 65 years of age or older.

There were 288 housing units, of which 15.6% were vacant. The homeowner vacancy rate was 5.2% and the rental vacancy rate was 11.8%.

Racial composition as of the 2020 census
Race	Number	Percent
White	232	32.6%
Black or African American	2	0.3%
American Indian and Alaska Native	384	54.0%
Asian	0	0.0%
Native Hawaiian and Other Pacific Islander	0	0.0%
Some other race	9	1.3%
Two or more races	84	11.8%
Hispanic or Latino (of any race)	24	3.4%

=== 2010 census ===
The median income for a household in Kansas was $25,893, and the median income for a family was $26,736. Males had a median income of $19,000 versus $21,771 for females. The per capita income for Kansas was $9,984. About 26.5% of families and 30.8% of the population were below the poverty line, including 36.2% of those under age 18 and 17.5% of those age 65 or over.

== Economy ==
Kansas is the location of one of the few remaining domestic custom pew and church manufacturers. Born Again Pews, owned and operated by local church leader Rex Blisard, began in 2005 as a ministry service, and evolved into a successful operation that delivers furniture nationwide.

Kansas is the location of one of the four campuses of Northeast Tech, a vocational and technical school. The Kansas campus has approximately 300 students, both adults as well as high school juniors and seniors from the Colcord, Jay, Locust Grove, Oaks, and Kansas schools districts.

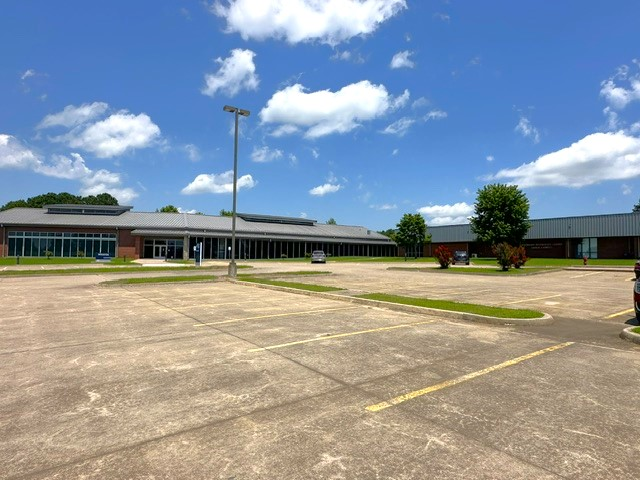
Kansas Campus of Northeast Tech as seen in July of 2026

== Education ==
It is in the Kansas Public Schools school district.

The town is host to the Kansas Campus of Northeast Tech, open since 1996.

== Notable people ==
- Darrell Winfield, the Marlboro Man, whose image for many years helped sell Marlboro cigarettes, was born in Kansas in 1929.
