= U.S. Route 59 in Oklahoma =

Highway in Oklahoma

U.S. Highway 59
- US 59 highlighted in red

Route information
- Maintained by ODOT
- Length: 216.47 mi (348.37 km)
- Existed: c. 1935–present

Major junctions
- South end: US 59 / US 270 at the Arkansas state line near Page
- US 259 near Heavener; US 270 in Heavener; US 271 in Poteau; I-40 / US 64 in Sallisaw; US 62 in Westville; Future I-42 / US 412 Toll / Cherokee Turnpike in Kansas; I-44 Toll / Will Rogers Turnpike / US 60 / US 69 near Afton
- North end: US-59 at the Kansas state line near Chetopa, KS

Location
- Country: United States
- State: Oklahoma
- Counties: Le Flore, Sequoyah, Adair, Delaware, Ottawa, Craig

Highway system
- United States Numbered Highway System; List; Special; Divided; Oklahoma State Highway System; Interstate; US; State; Turnpikes
← SH-58	→ SH-59

U.S. Route 59 (US 59) heads along the eastern portion of the state of Oklahoma. US 59's 216.47-mile (348.37 km) route through Oklahoma takes it through the mountainous terrain of the eastern Oklahoma Ouachitas and Ozarks. US 59 serves several lakes and towns through Oklahoma's Green Country, including Grand Lake, a major recreation center. The route enters the state from Arkansas near Fogel, Arkansas and ends at the Kansas state line south of Chetopa, Kansas.

US 59 was first designated in Oklahoma around 1935. The highway's route at that time was largely the same as it is today; however, between the Afton area and Welch, US 59 passed through Vinita instead following the modern-day route passing east of it. US 59 was changed to follow the present-day route in 1951. Since then, US 59 has undergone only minor adjustments, many of which eliminated curves and provided a more direct route for travelers using the highway to traverse eastern Oklahoma.

== Route description ==
=== Le Flore County ===
US 59 enters Oklahoma in Le Flore County, in the Ouachita National Forest, at the state line at Fogel, Arkansas. US 270 is concurrent with US 59 as it crosses the line. The two routes head westward from the state line, passing through a valley between Black Fork Mountain and Rich Mountain. The first Oklahoma town the two routes pass through is unincorporated Page. Northwest of town, US 59 and US 270 form the northern terminus of US 259 which heads south towards Longview, Texas and Nacogdoches, Texas crossing I-30 and I-20. After this junction, US 59 and US 270 curve around to the north and pass through the two small hamlets of Zoe and Stapp. US 59 and US 270 head north, paralleling the Black Fork Poteau River as they leave the national forest, into Hodgen. North of Hodgen, the highways cross the main branch of the Poteau River and pass through the Wister Wildlife Management Area. Upon landing on the north bank of the river, US 59 and US 270 curve to the northeast as they enter Heavener, where SH-128 terminates. On the north side of the town, US 270 splits away to the west. US 59 parallels the Kansas City Southern Railroad and passes Heavener Memorial Cemetery. The highway turns to the northwest, passing through Howe and intersects with SH-83 at its northern terminus. North of this junction, US 59 crosses the Poteau River again.

US 59 heads northward, coming to an interchange with US 271 just north of the Choctaw Country Club in the city of Poteau, county seat of Le Flore County. At this interchange, US 59 exits from the mainline to join US 271; continuing north through the interchange places the motorist on the Poteau Bypass, an unnumbered state highway. US 59 and US 271 proceed through Poteau, coming to an interchange at the southern terminus of SH-112 which is also the northern terminus of the Poteau Bypass. The two concurrent roads head north through the towns of Shady Point and Panama. North of Panama, US 59 and US 271 form the eastern terminus of SH-31. At Sunset Corner, US 59 turns to the west and US 271 turns to the east, ending the concurrency. SH-9 passes straight through this intersection from west to east; upon turning west, US 59 follows SH-9 for five miles (8.0 km), splitting away southeast of Cowlington. Just north of this junction, US 59 widens to a four-lane divided highway. It crosses the Arkansas River on a bridge just downstream of the dam that impounds Robert S. Kerr Reservoir. Upon crossing the river, the highway enters Sequoyah County.

=== Sequoyah and Adair counties ===
US 59's first highway junction in Sequoyah County is with SH-141 west of Gans, where the latter highway reaches its western terminus. US 59 continues northward, crossing Wildhorse Mountain as well as Little Sallisaw Creek, just upstream of where it empties into Robert S. Kerr Reservoir. The highway then enters the county seat of Sequoyah County, Sallisaw, where it has an interchange with Interstate 40 at Exit 308. North of the interstate, US 59 intersects US 64, turning east to follow the latter route into downtown Sallisaw. US 59 splits away to the north, becoming a two-lane highway. North of town, the highway serves as the western terminus of SH-101. US 59 then passes through unincorporated Brushy. North of Brushy, the highway winds through the Brushy Mountains. The road exits Sequoyah County north of this group of mountains.

The next county US 59 enters is mountainous Adair County. The route continues to follow a winding course as it makes its way northeast to unincorporated Cherry Tree. The highway continues northeast past Cherry Tree, before turning back to a due north course as it makes its way into the county seat of Stilwell. Here, the U.S. route has brief concurrencies with SH-100 and SH-51. US 59 leaves Stilwell, twisting through mountainous terrain alongside Peavine Creek until the stream's mouth at the Baron Fork of the Illinois River. The highway crosses the Baron Fork, then passes west of the unincorporated location of Baron. About twelve miles (19 km) north of Stilwell, the highway intersects with US 62 in Westville. From Westville, US 59 heads northward. The highway passes just east of Mission Mountain; north of the mountain, the road begins paralleling a Kansas City Southern railroad line. In northern Adair County, US 59 serves unincorporated Ballard and the town of Watts, where it runs just west of Lake Frances. North of Watts, the highway crosses the Illinois River and continues northward into Delaware County.

=== Delaware, Ottawa and Craig counties ===
In Delaware County, US 59 enters West Siloam Springs and becomes concurrent with US 412. This junction is only 0.07 miles (0.11 km) west of the Oklahoma–Arkansas state line. The two roads head westward through West Siloam Springs before coming to unincorporated Flint. US 59 and US 412 split here, with US 412 following the Cherokee Turnpike, which begins at this interchange. The eastern terminus of US 412 Alternate is also at this interchange; it becomes concurrent with US 59 as the two routes head west. The two highways enter Kansas, Oklahoma, where they part ways at an intersection with SH-10; US 412 Alternate continues to the east, while US 59 turns north along SH-10. Just north of this intersection lies an interchange with mainline US 412, which is still on the Cherokee Turnpike at this point. US 59 and SH-10 head north out of the town of Kansas, intersecting with SH-116 at its western terminus west of Colcord. As US 59 and SH-10 follow a course with many curves as they approach Eucha Lake, which they bridge the east arm of. In Jay, SH-20 joins the concurrency as US 59 and SH-10 turn east toward downtown Jay. There, the three highways form the southern terminus of SH-127. On the east side of Jay, US 59 and SH-10 turn north, leaving SH-20 as it heads east towards its intersection with Arkansas Highway 43. North of Jay, US 59 and SH-10 intersect with SH-127 again, this time at its northern terminus. US 59 and SH-10 cross over the Honey Creek arm of Grand Lake o' the Cherokees before coming to Grove, where SH-10 turns east and US 59 turns west. As it leaves Grove, US 59 turns northwest, running the length of a peninsula out into the lake. At the end of the peninsula, US 59 crosses the lake yet again, landing on the north shore near Copeland. The highway then passes into Ottawa County.

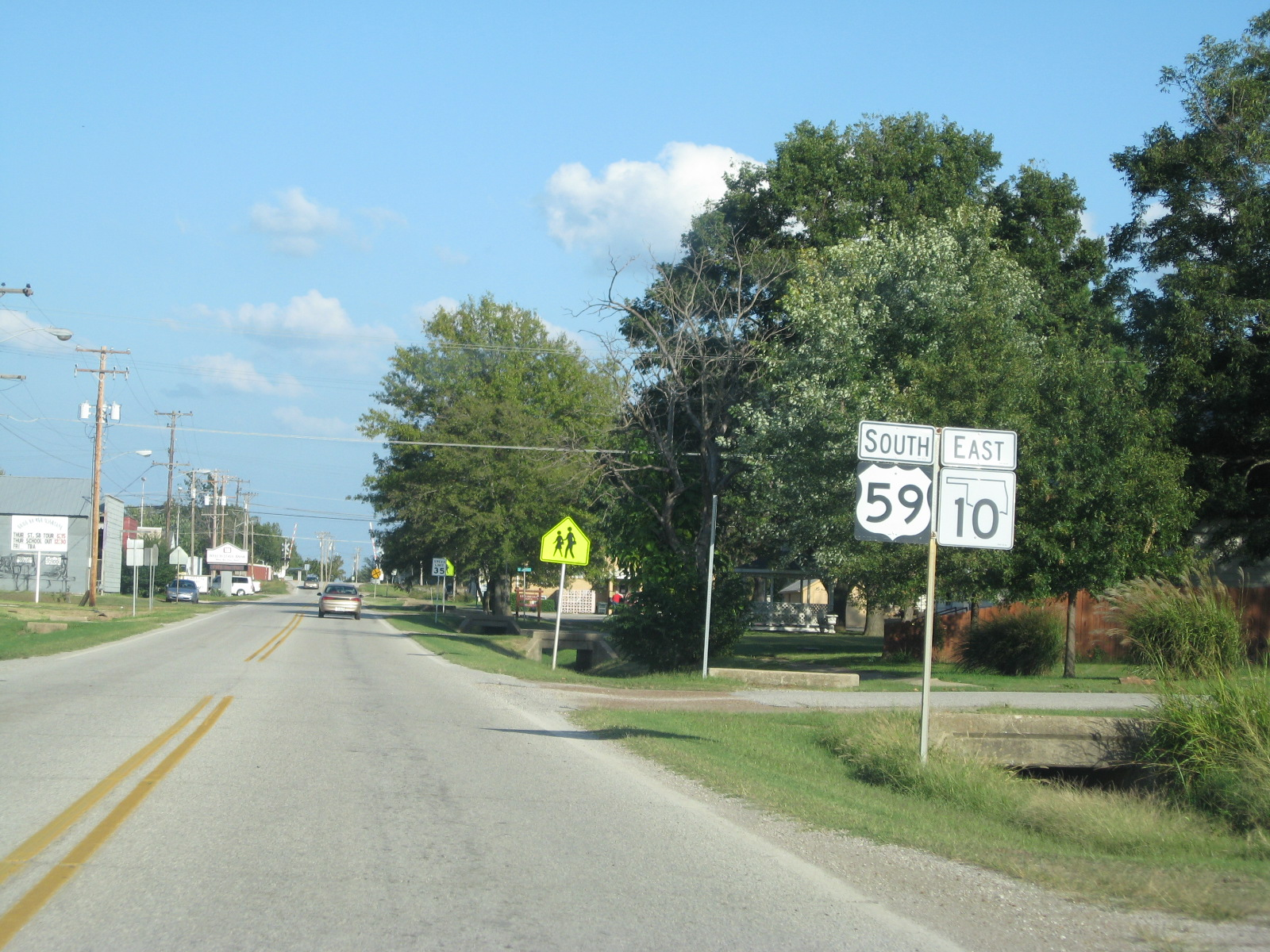
US 59 and SH-10 in Welch

The next highway junction for US 59, the first in Ottawa County, is with SH-125. US 59 turns due west shortly after this junction, then curves to due north. Just east of Afton, US 59 joins US 60 and US 69 and the three highways head northeast. However, only 0.8 miles (1.3 km) northeast of the junction, US 60 splits off at a cloverleaf interchange which also provides access to I-44, the Will Rogers Turnpike. US 59 and US 69 continue northward to Narcissa, where they are the site of SH-25's eastern terminus. Further north, at Dotyville, US 59 meets SH-10 again, turning west along it, while US 69 heads east along SH-10 toward Miami. US 59 and SH-10 continue west, turning north for one mile (1.6 km) before turning back to the west. Southwest of Dawes, the highways cross into Craig County. The northernmost town that US 59 serves in Oklahoma is Welch. Here, US 59 splits away from SH-10, turning northward along unsigned SH-2, its final stretch in Oklahoma. The highway crosses the Kansas state line 14.53 miles (23.38 km) north of Welch.

== History ==
Before US 59 was designated in Oklahoma, what would become its route was designated as US 270 between the Arkansas state line and Poteau, US 271 between Poteau and Sunset Corner, SH-10 along the modern-day SH-9 concurrency, SH-17 between Sallisaw and West Siloam Springs, SH-33 between West Siloam Springs and the town of Kansas, and SH-10 between Kansas and Grove. There was no road between modern-day SH-9 and Sallisaw. US 59 first appeared on the official state map in 1935. At this time, the road south of Sallisaw was marked as "Conditional Location", and between Grove and the Kansas state line, the highway followed a different route: it proceeded west out of Grove to meet US 60 / US 66 south of Afton, concurring with those two highways to Vinita, where it turned north along SH-2, following it to Welch and the state line.

The gap between SH-10 and Sallisaw was filled by the designation of a state highway there by the Oklahoma State Highway Commission on November 15, 1935. The commission designated this highway as US 59, effective upon the completion of its construction. Maintenance of the portion of this road in Sequoyah County was authorized on October 22, 1936.

On October 3, 1951, the highway commission approved the realignment of US 59 between the highway junction northeast of Afton and Welch. The old highway between Vinita and Welch became the northern SH-2. The Highway Commission modified US 59's route through Westville on February 5, 1952. Previously, at the site of the present-day US 59 / US 62 intersection, US 59 turned east along US 62, splitting off at Williams Avenue, then followed Williams Avenue north to Main Street, where it turned east. At the eastern city limit of Westville, US 59 turned north, joining its modern-day alignment 3.2 miles (5.1 km) north of the US 62 junction. With the 1952 realignment, US 59 continued straight through the intersection, bypassing Westville to the west. The next change to US 59 was a realignment between the SH-33 junction in the town of Kansas and downtown Jay. The new highway had several curves straightened, reducing this segment's length from 20.6 miles (33.2 km) to 18.9 miles (30.4 km). This change was approved by the Highway Commission on August 19, 1952.

On July 6, 1964, the Oklahoma State Highway Commission approved a realignment to US 59's route through Poteau. Another change, further north, was approved on March 4, 1968. This moved US 59 onto a new bridge over the Arkansas River upon completion of its construction, with the old highway being turned over to the U.S. Army Corps of Engineers. An application for this change was received by the American Association of State Highway Officials (AASHO) on March 26, 1968, and approved by that body on June 18, 1968.

The highway commission approved another alteration to US 59 in the Poteau area on February 5, 1973. On that date, the commission approved a realignment of US 59 from a point south of the intersection with US 270 and US 271, to that junction, and on into Poteau. The realignment was submitted to AASHO on April 10 of that year, received on April 13, and approved on June 26. A section of highway north of Jay was straightened on October 7, 1974. Another straightening was approved the following year, this time in the vicinity of Heavener; this change was approved by the highway commission on August 19, 1975, and approved by AASHO, now renamed to AASHTO, on July 13, 1976. On March 7, 1977, the Oklahoma State Transportation Commission (which had replaced the highway commission) approved another straightening in the Howe area. The realignment was approved by AASHTO on July 7, 1977.

The next change to US 59 came on November 2, 1981, when the transportation commission approved moving just over 5 1/2 miles (8.9 km) of highway between Flint and West Siloam Springs to the north of the previous alignment. AASHTO approved the realignment on June 29, 1982. A section of highway, south of Stilwell, in Sequoyah and Adair counties, was straightened, shortening the highway by 0.22 miles (350 m). The transportation commission approved on October 4, 1982.

On September 7, 1999, the Oklahoma State Transportation Commission approved an item realigning US 59 and SH-100 in Stilwell, removing US 59 from Second Street and placing it on Front Street. On March 3, 2003, the commission approved elimination of two sharp curves in western Ottawa County, shortening the highway by 0.57 miles (0.92 km).

The section of US 59 between I-40 and SH-9 was pressed into service as a detour for eastbound I-40 traffic after the collapse of its bridge over the Arkansas River on May 26, 2002.

== Junction list ==
County	Location	mi	km	Destinations	Notes
Oklahoma–Arkansas line		0.00	0.00	US 59 south / US 270 east – Mena	Continuation into Arkansas
Le Flore		8.5	13.7	US 259 south – Broken Bow	Northern terminus of US 259
Le Flore	Heavener	22.5	36.2	SH-128 east – Bates	Western terminus of SH-128
Le Flore	Heavener	23.3	37.5	US 270 west – Lake Wister State Park, Wister	Northern end of US 270 concurrency
Le Flore		30.4	48.9	SH-83 east – Monroe, Hartford	Western terminus of SH-83
Le Flore	Poteau	34.1	54.9	US 59 Byp. north (Cavanal Expressway) / US 271 south – Wister, Sallisaw, Fort Smith	Parclo interchange; southern end of US 271 concurrency; southern terminus of US 59 Byp.
Le Flore	Poteau	38.9	62.6	US 59 Byp. south (Cavanal Expressway) / SH-112 north	Parclo interchange; northern terminus of US 59 Byp.; southern terminus of SH-112
Le Flore		46.4	74.7	SH-31 west – Bokoshe, Kinta	Eastern terminus of SH-31
Le Flore	Sunset Corner	51.9	83.5	US 271 north / SH-9 east – Spiro, Fort Smith	Northern end of US 271 concurrency, eastern end of SH-9 concurrency
Le Flore		57.4	92.4	SH-9 west – Keota, Stigler	Western end of SH-9 concurrency
Sequoyah		72.6	116.8	SH-141 east – Gans	Western terminus of SH-141
Sequoyah	Sallisaw	78.2	125.9	I-40 – Fort Smith, Oklahoma City I-40 BL begins	Western terminus of I-40 BL; exit 308 on I-40
Sequoyah	Sallisaw	79.0	127.1	US 64 west	Western end of US 64 concurrency
Sequoyah	Sallisaw	80.1	128.9	US 64 east / I-40 BL east	Eastern end of US 64 concurrency
Sequoyah		83.4	134.2	SH-101 east – Akins	Western terminus of SH-101
Adair	Stilwell	107.5	173.0	SH-100 east – Evansville	Southern end of SH-100 concurrency
Adair	Stilwell	108.1	174.0	SH-100 west – Tenkiller	Northern end of SH-100 concurrency
Adair	Stilwell	109.4	176.1	SH-51 east	Southern end of SH-51 concurrency
Adair	Stilwell	110.1	177.2	SH-51 west – Tahlequah, Tulsa	Northern end of SH-51 concurrency
Adair	Westville	122.1	196.5	US 62 – Fayetteville, Tahlequah, Muskogee	
Delaware	West Siloam Springs	140.5	226.1	US 412 east – Siloam Springs, Springdale	Southern end of US 412 concurrency
Delaware	Flint Creek	148.8	239.5	Future I-42 west / US 412 Toll west / Cherokee Turnpike west – Tulsa US 412 Alt. begins	Northern end of US 412 concurrency; northbound exit and southbound entrance; eastern terminus of US 412 Alt. and the Cherokee Turnpike
Delaware	Kansas	153.1	246.4	US 412 Alt. west / SH-10 south – Leach, Locust Grove, Tulsa, Tahlequah	Northern end of US 412 concurrency; southern end of SH-10 concurrency
Delaware	Kansas	153.6	247.2	Future I-42 / US 412 Toll / Cherokee Turnpike – Siloam Springs, Tulsa	Diamond interchange; Cherokee Turnpike exit 28
Delaware		157.4	253.3	SH-116 east – Colcord	Western terminus of SH-116
Delaware	Jay	170.3	274.1	SH-20 west – Spavinaw, Pryor Creek	Western end of SH-20 concurrency
Delaware	Jay	172.0	276.8	SH-127 north – Drowning Creek, Zena	Southern terminus of SH-127
Delaware	Jay	172.5	277.6	SH-20 east – Southwest City	Eastern end of SH-20 concurrency
Delaware		177.6	285.8	SH-127 south – Zena, Drowning Creek	Northern terminus of SH-127
Delaware	Grove	184.5	296.9	SH-10 north	Northern end of SH-10 concurrency
Ottawa		192.8	310.3	SH-125 – Monkey Island, Fairland	
Ottawa	Afton	198.3	319.1	US 60 west / US 69 south	Southern end of US 60/US 69 concurrency
Ottawa		199.1	320.4	US 60 east – Fairland	Interchange; northern end of US 60 concurrency
Ottawa		199.1	320.4	I-44 Toll / Will Rogers Turnpike – Joplin, Tulsa	I-44 exit 302
Ottawa	Narcissa	204.8	329.6	SH-25 west – Bluejacket	Eastern terminus of SH-25
Ottawa	Dotyville	209.2	336.7	US 69 north / SH-10 east – Miami	Northern end of US 69 concurrency; southern end of SH-10 concurrency
Craig	Welch	220.4	354.7	SH-2 south (Washington Street south) / SH-10 west (4th Street west) – Vinita, Pryor Creek, Lenapah	Northern end of SH-10 concurrency; southern end of SH-2 concurrency
Oklahoma–Kansas line		229.4	369.2	US-59 north – Chetopa, Oswego SH-2 ends	Continuation into Kansas; northern terminus of SH-2
1.000 mi = 1.609 km; 1.000 km = 0.621 mi: Concurrency terminus; Electronic toll collection

== Poteau Bypass ==
U.S. Highway 59 Bypass
- Location: West of Poteau
- Length: 4.29 mi (6.90 km)

U.S. Route 59 Bypass, also known as the Cavanal Expressway, is a special route of U.S. Route 59 running along the west outskirts of Poteau. It is 4.29 miles (6.90 km) long.

On the official state highway maps, US 59 is shown routed along the bypass. It is signed alternately as US 59 Bypass and US 59/US 271.

U.S. Route 59
Previous state: Arkansas	Oklahoma	Next state: Kansas
