= Oklahoma State Highway 125 =

State highway in Oklahoma, United States

State Highway 125
- SH-125 highlighted in red

Route information
- Maintained by ODOT
- Length: 25.7 mi (41.4 km)
- Existed: ca. 1958–present

Major junctions
- South end: Monkey Island, Grand Lake O' the Cherokees
- US 59 near Copeland; US 60 in Fairland
- North end: US 69 / SH-10 in Miami

Location
- Country: United States
- State: Oklahoma

Highway system
- Oklahoma State Highway System; Interstate; US; State; Turnpikes
← SH-123	→ SH-127

State Highway 125 (abbreviated SH-125) is a state highway in northeastern Oklahoma that is 25.7 miles (41.4 km) long. It begins in the south at Grand Lake O' the Cherokees, ending in Miami at US-69/SH-10. It has no lettered spur routes.

SH-125 was established in the late 1950s as a gravel spur to Monkey Island from US-59. It was paved within the first five years of its existence, and was extended north to Miami in the early 1970s.

== Route description ==
State Highway 125 begins on Monkey Island, a peninsula jutting into Grand Lake, at the Shangri-La resort at the southern tip of the peninsula. From the southern terminus, the highway proceeds northeast through a series of sharp curves, providing access to Grand Lake Regional Airport, a general aviation facility. It continues north to the former Teramiranda Airport, then crosses Echo Bay, leaving Monkey Island. The route then meets State Highway 85A six miles (9.7 km) north of SH-125's southern terminus; this junction forms SH-85A's eastern terminus. North of the junction, SH-125 makes a hard right, turning east, then a hard left, turning it back on a northward course. After negotiating a few curves west of Copeland, SH-125 crosses from Delaware County into Ottawa County.

SH-125 intersects US-59 just north of the county line. Its next highway junction, with US-60, occurs in Fairland, 5.30 miles (8.53 km) north of the Delaware–Ottawa county line. SH-125 overlaps US-60 for 0.1 miles (0.16 km) before splitting away to the north. The highway turns west as it approaches Miami, crossing over I-44 (the Will Rogers Turnpike) with no direct access. As it enters Miami, it turns to the north, curving northeast to bridge the Neosho River, one of the two primary tributaries of Grand Lake. As the route lands on the north shore of the river, it begins to follow South Main Street. SH-125 ends at Steve Owens Boulevard (3rd Avenue), which carries US-69 and SH-10.

== History ==
SH-125 first appears on the 1959 edition of the Oklahoma state highway map. Initially, it began at Monkey Island and had a northern terminus at US-59 (which, at the time, was also concurrent with SH-25). In 1959, the entirety of SH-125 had a gravel driving surface. By 1961, the highway had been paved. The highway's northern terminus was moved to Miami by 1972, extending it through rural Ottawa County and Fairland. No major changes to the highway have occurred since then.

== Junction list ==
County	Location	mi	km	Destinations	Notes
Delaware		0.0	0.0	End of route	Southern terminus
Delaware		6.7	10.8	SH-85A	Eastern terminus of SH-85A
Ottawa		10.8	17.4	US 59	
Ottawa	Fairland	15.5	24.9	US 60	Western end of US-60 concurrency
Ottawa	Fairland	15.6	25.1	US 60	Eastern end of US-60 concurrency
Ottawa	Miami	25.7	41.4	US 69 / SH-10	Northern terminus
1.000 mi = 1.609 km; 1.000 km = 0.621 mi: Concurrency terminus
