= Oklahoma State Highway 137 =

State highway in Oklahoma, United States

State Highway 137

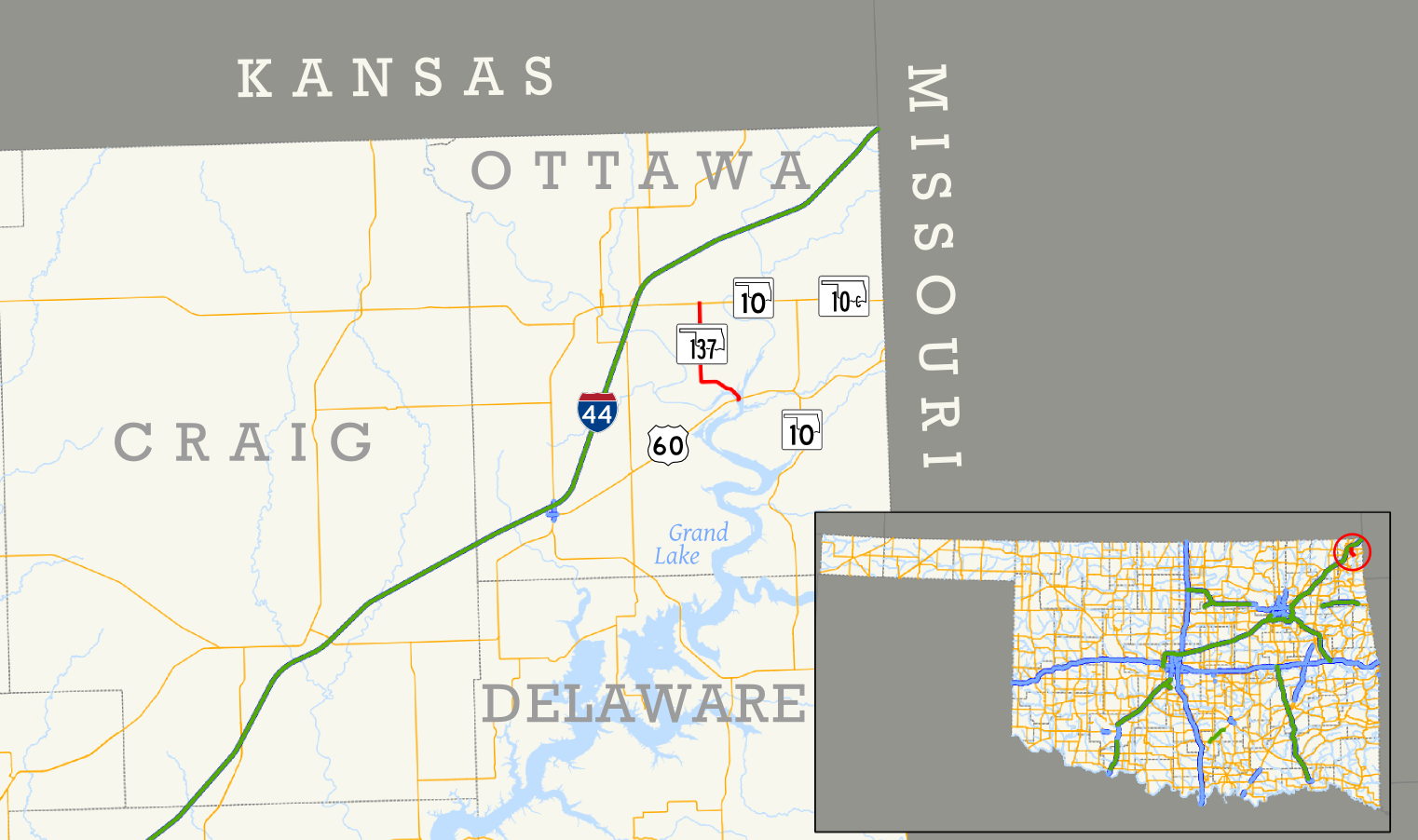

Route information
- Maintained by ODOT
- Length: 6.31 mi (10.15 km)
- Existed: 1957–present

Major junctions
- South end: US 60 in Twin Bridges State Park
- North end: SH-10 east of Miami

Location
- Country: United States
- State: Oklahoma

Highway system
- Oklahoma State Highway System; Interstate; US; State; Turnpikes
← SH-136	→ SH-141

State Highway 137 (SH-137) is a 6.31-mile (10.15 km) highway in Ottawa County, Oklahoma. It is a two-lane highway beginning at State Highway 10 east of Miami and ends at U.S. Highway 60 in Twin Bridges State Park on the north side of the Grand Lake o' the Cherokees. It has no lettered spur routes.

SH-137 was established circa 1957. The highway's northern terminus was formerly US-69 Alternate in Quapaw, but the portion of highway from SH-10 to US-69 Alternate has since been removed from the state highway system.

== Route description ==
SH-137 begins at an intersection with US-60 in Twin Bridges State Park. The intersection lies between the Neosho River and the Spring River, near the point where the two rivers merge to form the Grand Lake o' the Cherokees. From the terminus, the highway heads northwest out of the park. After clearing the park boundaries, the road curves to due west, then makes a sharp curve onto a due north course. Approximately 3 miles (4.8 km) north of the turn, the highway passes through the unincorporated location of Ottawa. The highway's terminus lies 1 mile (1.6 km) further north, at an intersection with SH-10.

== History ==
SH-137 first appears on the 1958 state highway map. At this time, the route began at US-60 and continued north to SH-10 north of Ottawa as it does today. However, it continued north from there; its northern terminus was in Quapaw at what was then US-66 (present day US-69 Alternate). The highway had a gravel surface at this time. SH-137 was paved in its entirety by 1961. The route remained in this configuration throughout the remainder of the twentieth century.

In 2002, the portion of highway north of SH-10 was stripped of its designation as SH-137 and turned over to Ottawa County, truncating the route to its present-day termini. No further changes have occurred to the route since.

== Junction list ==
The entire route is in Ottawa County.

Location	mi	km	Destinations	Notes
Twin Bridges State Park	0.00	0.00	US 60	Southern terminus
	6.31	10.15	SH-10	Northern terminus
1.000 mi = 1.609 km; 1.000 km = 0.621 mi
