= Oklahoma State Highway 2 =

State highway in Oklahoma, United States

State Highway 2

Route information
- Maintained by ODOT

Section 1
- Length: 116.7 mi (187.8 km)
- South end: SH-3 west of Antlers
- Major intersections: US 271 in Clayton; US 270 in Wilburton; SH-9 in Whitefield; I-40 in Warner
- North end: US 64 / US 266 in Warner

Section 2
- Length: 26.3 mi (42.3 km)
- South end: US 60 / US 69 in Vinita
- North end: US-59 at the Kansas state line

Location
- Country: United States
- State: Oklahoma

Highway system
- Oklahoma State Highway System; Interstate; US; State; Turnpikes
← SH-1	→ SH-3

State Highway 2, abbreviated SH-2 or OK-2, is a designation for two distinct highways maintained by the U.S. state of Oklahoma. Though they were once connected, the middle section of highway was concurrent with three different U.S. highways, so the middle section was decommissioned for reasons of redundancy.

The southern section of highway runs from Antlers to U.S. Highway 64 near Warner, covering 116.7 miles (187.8 km) through the southeastern part of the state. The northern SH-2 runs for 26.3 miles (42.3 km) through Craig County in northeastern Oklahoma.

== Route descriptions ==
=== Southern section ===
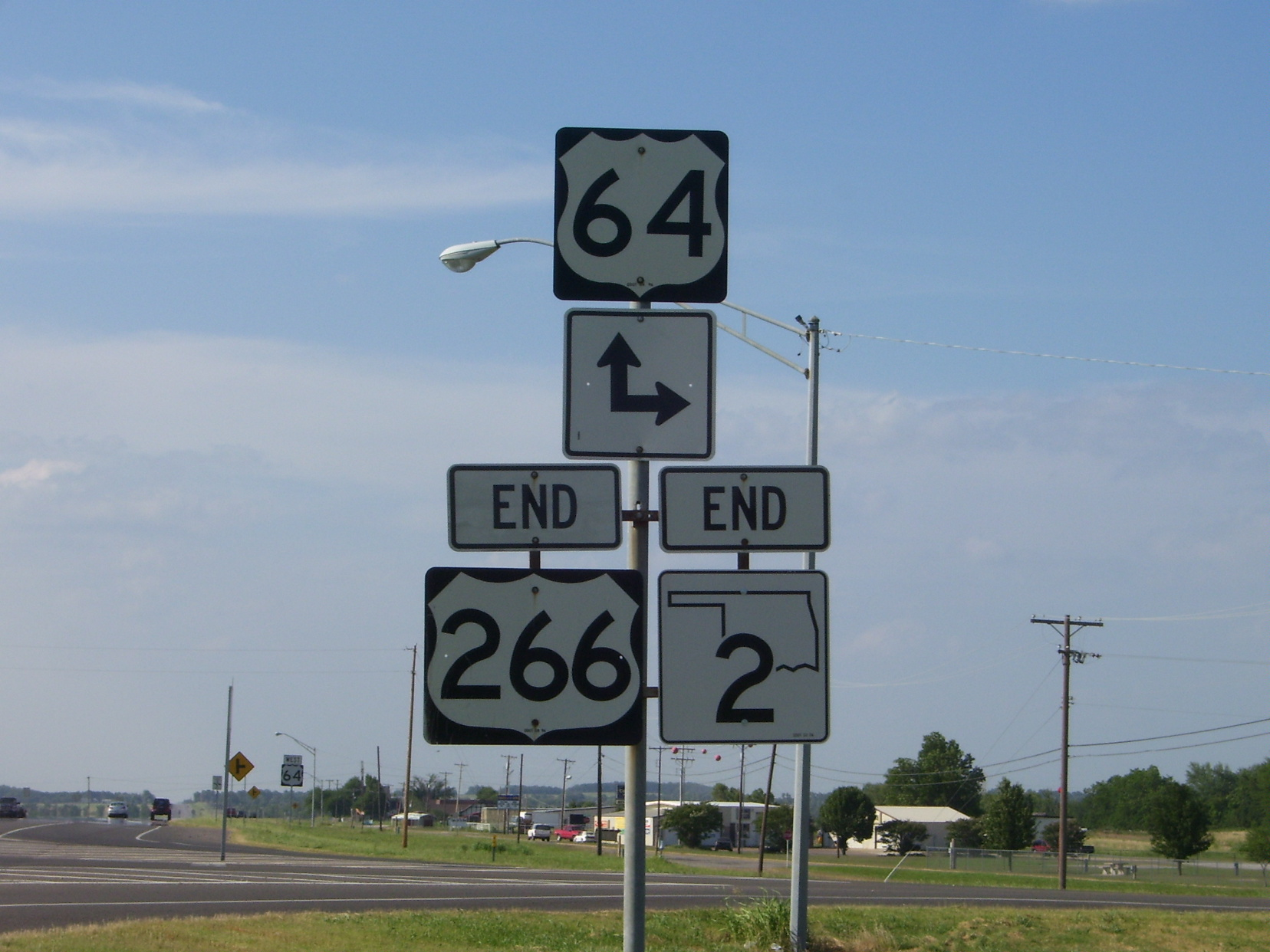
The end of US-266 and SH-2 near Warner

The southern section of SH-2 begins at SH-3 in Antlers. It travels north-northwest from here, roughly parallelling the Kiamichi River, until reaching Clayton and US-271. North of Clayton, Highway 2 and US-271 overlap for 3 miles (4.8 km). Immediately after this, SH-2 meets SH-43's eastern terminus southeast of Sardis Lake. SH-2 then crosses over the lake and meets SH-1/SH-63, and the three form a six-mile (10 km) concurrency. This area is mountainous and has some tight hairpin curves. After the concurrency Highway 2 continues northward, meeting US-270 at Wilburton.

SH-2 then passes Robbers Cave State Park and the eastern edge of the Sansbois Mountains before reaching SH-31 east of Quinton, and the two form a six-mile (10 km) concurrency until Kinta. One hundred miles (160 km) north of here, Highway 2 meets SH-9. Three miles (4.8 km) later, the highway passes the eastern terminus of SH-71, south of the town of Porum, Oklahoma. 10 miles (16 km) later, SH-2 meets US-266, which it will overlap until its end. After having an interchange at I-40 milemarker 278, both SH-2 and US-266 end at US-64 near Warner.

=== Northern section ===
The northern SH-2 begins at US-60/US-69 in Vinita. It then heads due north, meeting SH-25 four miles (6.4 km) west of Bluejacket. Six miles north of here, it comes to a junction with US-59 and SH-10 in Welch, Oklahoma.

All signage for SH-2 ends at US-59/SH-10 in Welch. However, the official definition of the highway contains an unsigned concurrency with US-59 to the point where it crosses the state line into Kansas.

== History ==
The northern SH-2, between Vinita and the Kansas state line, was once part of US-73.

Until the early 1980s a portion of SH-2 was one of the last unpaved state highways in the Oklahoma road network. The section between the communities of Kosoma, Oklahoma and Stanley, Oklahoma in the Kiamichi River Valley, remained gravel. Its builders during the 1930s and 1940s, in order to save the expense of building two bridges across the Kiamichi River, routed the highway mid-way up the flank of Bull Creek Mountain. The highway traversed the mountain at its midway point, with no shoulders or guard rails. During the 1980s a new route was opened in the floor of the valley, featuring modern bridges across Pine Creek and the Kiamichi River. The old route on Bull Creek Mountain was decommissioned and is no longer in use.

The old route from Clayton to Antlers (using Bull Creek Mountain) was known as Hwy 144. When the Route was renovated through the Valley (crossing the river in 2 places) and paved, the Route was renamed SH2.

The section of SH-2 between I-40 and SH-9 was pressed into service as a detour for eastbound I-40 traffic after the collapse of its bridge over the Arkansas River on May 26, 2002.

== Junction list ==
=== Southern section ===
County	Location	mi	km	Destinations	Notes
Pushmataha	Antlers	0.0	0.0	SH-3	Southern terminus
Pushmataha	Clayton	33.4	53.8	US 271	Southern end of US-271 concurrency
Pushmataha		36.7	59.1	US 271	Northern end of US-271 concurrency
Pushmataha		38.8	62.4	SH-43	
Latimer		45.5	73.2	SH-1 / SH-63	Southern end of SH-1/SH-63 concurrency
Latimer		51.6	83.0	SH-1 / SH-63	Northern end of SH-1/SH-63 concurrency
Latimer		63.3	101.9	US 270	Southern end of US-270 concurrency
Latimer	Wilburton	63.8	102.7	US 270	Northern end of US-270 concurrency
Haskell		82.8	133.3	SH-31	Western end of SH-31 concurrency
Haskell	Kinta	88.5	142.4	SH-31	Eastern end of SH-31 concurrency
Haskell	Whitefield	98.6	158.7	SH-9	
Muskogee		104.5	168.2	SH-71	Eastern terminus of SH-71
Muskogee		114.0	183.5	US 266	Southern end of US-266 concurrency
Muskogee		115.1	185.2	I-40	I-40 exit 278
Muskogee	Warner	116.7	187.8	US 64	Northern terminus of SH-2, eastern terminus of US-266
1.000 mi = 1.609 km; 1.000 km = 0.621 mi: Concurrency terminus

=== Northern section ===
County	Location	mi	km	Destinations	Notes
Craig	Vinita	0.0	0.0	US 60 / US 69	Southern terminus
Craig	Pyramid Corners	11.4	18.3	SH-25	
Craig	Welch	17.3	27.8	US 59 / SH-10	Southern end of US-59 concurrency
Oklahoma–Kansas state line		26.3	42.3	SH-2 ends US-59 continues north into Kansas	
1.000 mi = 1.609 km; 1.000 km = 0.621 mi: Concurrency terminus
