= U.S. Route 60 in Oklahoma =

Section of U.S. Highway in Oklahoma, United States

U.S. Highway 60
- US-60 highlighted in red

Route information
- Maintained by ODOT
- Length: 352.39 mi (567.12 km)
- Existed: May 29, 1930–present

Major junctions
- West end: US 60 at the Texas state line near Higgins, TX
- US 283 near Arnett; US 183 near Seiling; US 81 in Enid; US 64 in North Enid; I-35 near Tonkawa; US 77 in Ponca City; US 75 in Bartlesville; US 169 in Nowata; I-44 / US 69 in Vinita; US 59 near Afton
- East end: US 60 at the Missouri state line in Seneca, MO

Location
- Country: United States
- State: Oklahoma
- Counties: Ellis, Dewey, Major, Garfield, Grant, Kay, Osage, Washington, Nowata, Craig, Delaware, Ottawa

Highway system
- United States Numbered Highway System; List; Special; Divided; Oklahoma State Highway System; Interstate; US; State; Turnpikes
← SH-59	→ US 62

U.S. Route 60 (US-60) is a transcontinental U.S. highway extending from near Brenda, Arizona to Virginia Beach, Virginia on the Atlantic Ocean. Along the way, 352.39 miles (567.12 km) of the route lies within the state of Oklahoma. The highway crosses into the state from Texas west of Arnett and serves many towns and cities in the northern part of the state, including Arnett, Seiling, Fairview, Enid, Ponca City, Pawhuska, Bartlesville, and Vinita. US-60 exits Oklahoma near Seneca, Missouri. In Oklahoma, US-60 has three business routes, serving Tonkawa, Ponca City, and Seneca. The first 60.2 miles (96.9 km) of the route, from the Texas line to Seiling, is also designated as State Highway 51 (SH-51).

US-60, as originally designated, did not enter Oklahoma. Instead, it ended in Springfield, Missouri, continuing east from there. AASHO approved an extension of US-60 on May 29, 1930, which extended it west through Oklahoma to Amarillo, Texas. US-60's extension displaced US-164 in its entirety; that designation was then retired.

== Route description ==
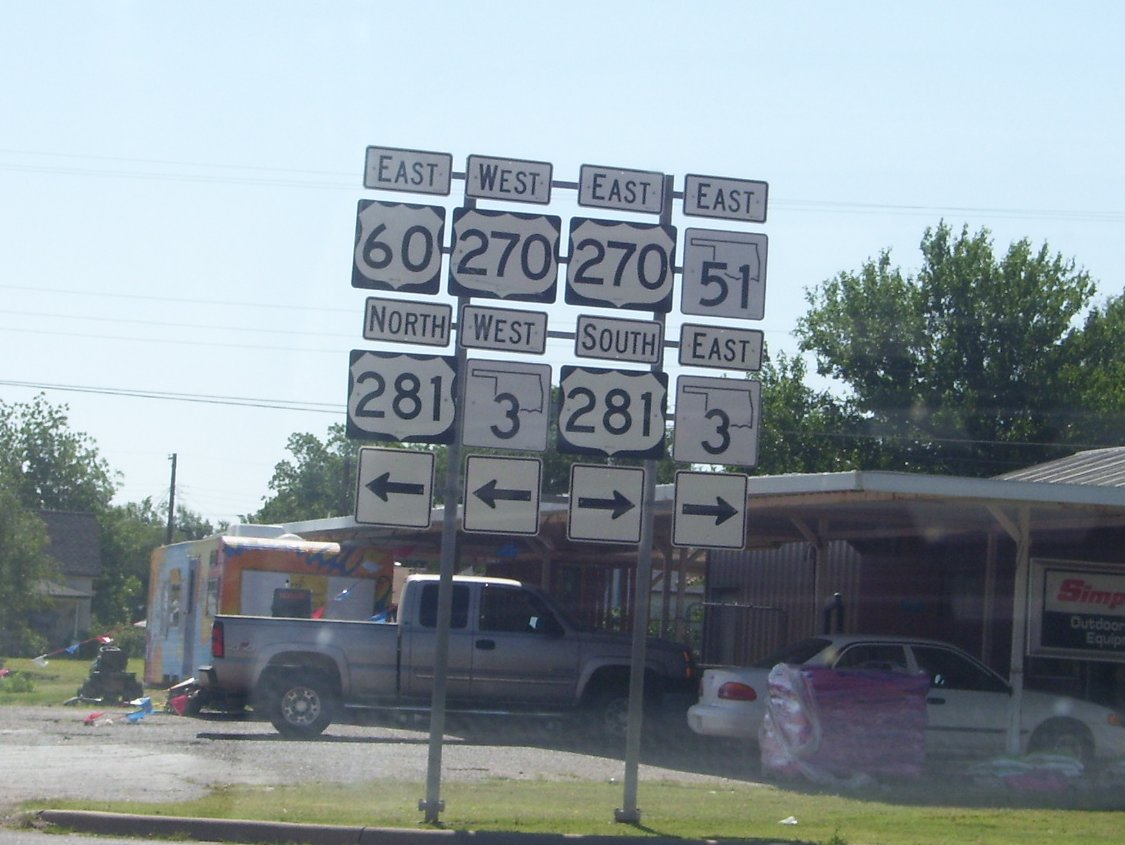
US-60 and SH-51 part ways in Seiling after spending their first 60.2 miles concurrent. The concurrency of US 60 and US 270 demonstrates one of the examples of a wrong-way concurrency.

US-60 enters Oklahoma in Ellis County, just east of Higgins, Texas. SH-51 begins at the state line concurrent with US-60, and will remain so for the next 60.2 miles (96.9 km). The highways head due east from the state line for seven miles (11 km) before coming to an intersection with US-283. US-283 follows US-60 and SH-51 into Arnett, where they serve as the southern terminus for SH-46. East of Arnett, US-283 splits off to the south. US-60/SH-51 continue east through the unincorporated location of Harmon and on into Dewey County.

In the northwest part of Dewey County, US-60/SH-51 pass through Vici, where they share a brief concurrency with SH-34. The highways continue east for 11 miles (18 km) to Cestos, another unincorporated place, and proceed for eight miles (13 km) to a junction with US-183. US-60/SH-51 then enter the city of Seiling, where the two routes part ways. SH-51 turns southeast along eastbound US-270, southbound US-281, and southbound SH-3; US-60 instead follows westbound US-270, northbound US-281, and northbound SH-3. The four routes pass through downtown Seiling. On the north side of town, US-270 and SH-3 continue to the northwest, while US-60 and US-281 take a more northerly tack that will take them towards Major County.

US-60 and US-281 cross the North Canadian River into Major County north of Seiling. They split at unincorporated Chester, five miles (8.0 km) north of Seiling; US-281 continues north toward Waynoka, while US-60 turns east. US-60 then passes through a series of unincorporated locations: Orion, Bado, Dane, and Cedar Springs. The highway next enters Fairview, the county seat. On the south side of town, US-60 and SH-58 join in a concurrency and head north. In downtown Fairview, SH-58 leaves the concurrency but SH-8 joins US-60 as it continues north out of town. Six miles (9.7 km) north of Fairview, US-60 and SH-8 meet US-412 at unincorporated Orienta; US-412 joins the concurrency. The three highways cross the Cimarron River together before SH-8 splits off to the north towards Cleo Springs. US-60 and US-412 continue to the east, meeting up with SH-58 again on the north edge of Ringwood. The two US highways pass through Meno before coming to the Major–Garfield County line.

Soon after entering Garfield County, US-60/US-412 run through Lahoma. Three miles (4.8 km) east of there, they share a brief concurrency with SH-132. The two highways enter the county seat of Garfield County, the city of Enid, along Owen K. Garriott Road, named in honor of the astronaut. In downtown Enid, US-60 turns off of Garriott and onto Van Buren Street, leaving US-412 and joining US-81 instead. The two routes proceed north towards a junction with US-64, which joins the other US routes to form a three-way concurrency—a wrong-way concurrency, as US-60 eastbound is also US-64 westbound and vice versa. The routes straddle the line between Enid and North Enid and serve as the eastern terminus of SH-45. All three highways then exit Enid, and continue north to leave Garfield County as well.

Upon leaving Garfield County, US-60/US-64/US-81 enter Grant County. Fourteen miles (23 km) north of Enid, the three routes come to a T junction; US-64 turns west here, while US-60 and US-81 head east. After four miles (6.4 km), the highways come to the town of Pond Creek; here US-81 splits off towards the county seat of Medford and on to Kansas. US-60 continues east, crossing the Salt Fork of the Arkansas River and briefly concurring with SH-74 to the west of Lamont, where the two part ways.

Kay County is the next county US-60 passes through, and the first settlement US-60 comes to is the city of Tonkawa. Here, US-60 has an interchange with one of the two interstate highways it will meet in Oklahoma, Interstate 35 (I-35) at exit 214. East of I-35, US-60 begins a concurrency with US-77; this interchange is also the western terminus of US-60 Business, which serves downtown Tonkawa. US-177 joins the concurrency at the next interchange, which is also the other end of the Tonkawa business loop. Further east is an interchange with SH-156, the northern terminus of that route. US-60/US-77/US-177 then reach the outskirts of Ponca City, Kay County's largest city. Ponca City, too, has a business loop from US-60, which begins at the next interchange east. The three U.S. routes mostly bypass the city to the south, only actually entering the city limits at its far southern extent. In Ponca City, US-60 Business reunites with mainline US-60 and ends. This intersection is also where the three-way concurrency between the U.S. routes breaks; US-77 heads north along US-60 Business, deeper into Ponca City, US-177 heads south toward Stillwater, and US-60 heads east to cross the Arkansas River.

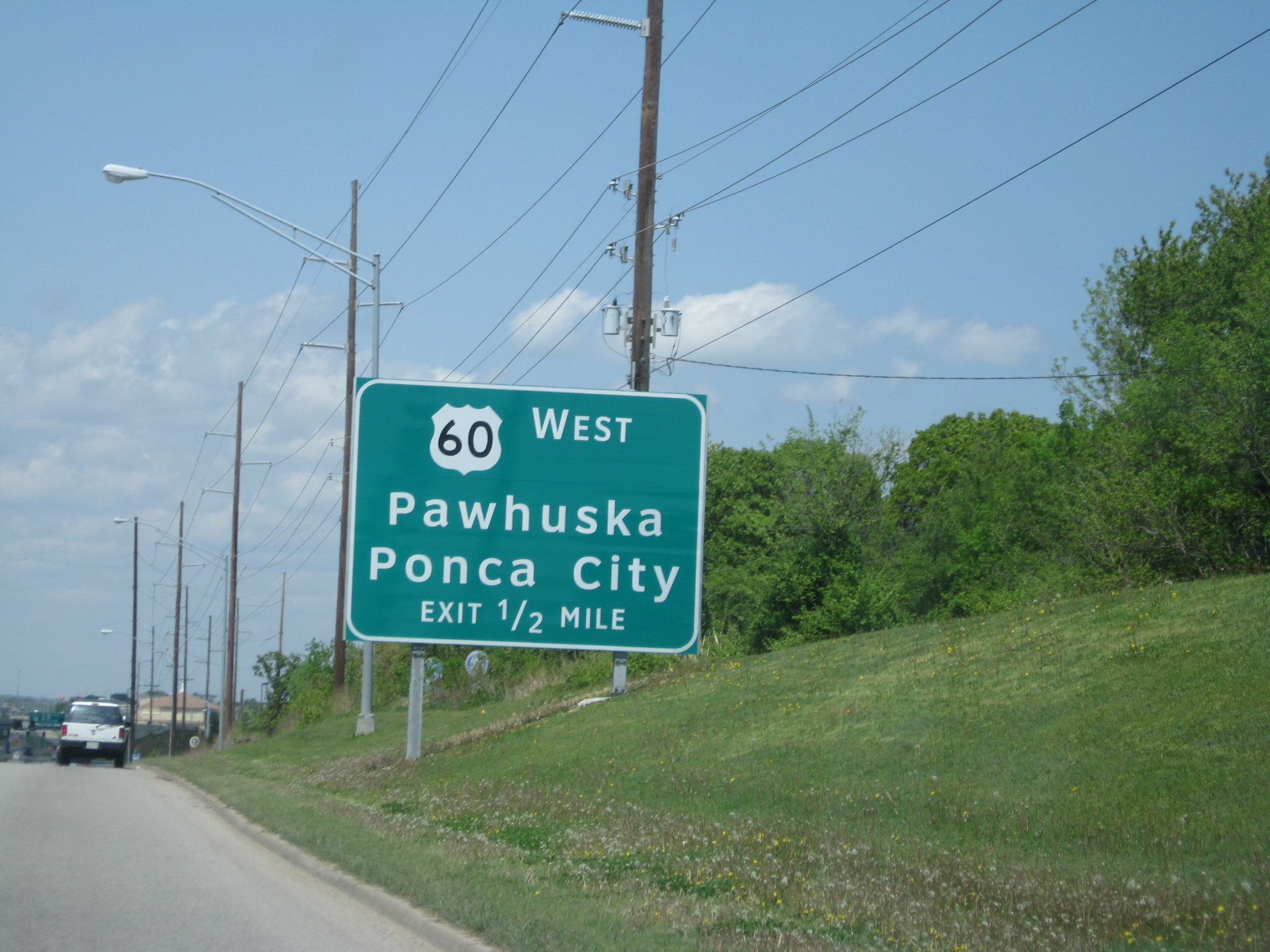
US-60 connects many north-central Oklahoma cities and towns, including Ponca City, Pawhuska, and Bartlesville, where this sign is located.

Upon crossing the Arkansas, US-60 enters Osage County and the Osage Nation reservation, which is coterminous with the county. US-60 does not have another junction with a state highway for 21 miles (34 km), when it comes to an intersection with SH-11 and SH-18 southeast of Burbank. SH-11 splits away from SH-18 to follow US-60 instead. From the SH-18 junction, the highways' next state highway junction lies 20 miles (32 km) further east, in Pawhuska, the county seat. Here, US-60 and SH-11 come to a T intersection with SH-99; eastbound SH-11 heads south along SH-99 while US-60 heads north. North of Pawhuska, US-60 splits off to the east once again, as SH-99 continues north to the Kansas line. US-60 serves as the northern terminus of a spur route to Osage Hills State Park; this route, while state maintained and numbered as SH-35, does not bear any conventional state highway signage.

US-60 next comes to a junction with SH-123 as it enters Bartlesville. The SH-123 junction lies a few feet into Washington County; south of the junction, US-60 and SH-123 form a concurrency, and the two routes curve slightly to the west and straddle the Washington–Osage county line. After only 0.2 miles (0.32 km), US-60 turns to the east along Adams Boulevard, splitting away from SH-123, and fully enters Washington County. US-60 runs through downtown Bartlesville on Adams, then bridges the Caney River. The highway continues to an interchange with US-75. At this interchange, US-60 turns south and overlaps US-75 before splitting off to the east once again, leaving Bartlesville and, soon, Washington County behind.

Next along US-60's route is Nowata County, and the county seat of the same name, 17 miles (27 km) east of Bartlesville. In Nowata, the route uses a series of local streets to pass through town, following, from west to east, Davis Avenue, Pecan Street, Delaware Avenue, and Pine Street before turning onto Cherokee Avenue. It intersects with US-169 Alternate at Maple Street, then with US-169 itself at Ash Street. In the east part of Nowata, US-60 transitions from Cherokee Avenue to Fairview Avenue, which it remains on as it exits town. Three miles (4.8 km) east of Nowata, the highway passes through unincorporated Coodys Bluff, where it crosses the Verdigris River. five miles (8.0 km) east of Coody's Bluff, the highway junctions with SH-28. US-60 continues into Craig County, leaving Nowata County.

US-60's first highway junction in Craig County is at the eastern terminus of SH-66 east of the incorporated location of White Oak. US-60 then proceeds east, joining with US-69 as the two head into Vinita, the county seat. In Vinita, the highways serve as the southern terminus of the northern SH-2. Just outside Vinita, US-60 has its first interchange with I-44, which is also carrying the Will Rogers Turnpike at this point (this is US-69's second I-44 junction; it previously intersected I-44 near Big Cabin). Four miles (6.4 km) east of the I-44 junction, US-60/US-69 serve as the northern terminus of SH-82. East of here, the two US highways clip the corner of Delaware County; while in Delaware County, they meet SH-85 at is northern terminus.

Ottawa County is the final Oklahoma county that both US-60 and US-69 will pass through. The two routes first pass through the town of Afton. The first highway junction in the county is with US-59, which concurs with the other two highways. Less than a mile north of the US-59 junction, the three highways pass through a cloverleaf interchange; proceeding north through this interchange places a motorist on US-59/US-69 bound for Miami, heading west leads to the toll booth for I-44, and turning east puts the motorist on US-60 eastbound. US-60, now with no other highways concurrent with it, will parallel the BNSF rail line for the remainder of its time in Oklahoma. The next town the route passes through is Fairland; here, it has a brief concurrency with SH-125. US-60 crosses the Neosho River (also known as the Grand River) into Twin Bridges State Park. Within the park, the highway serves as the southern terminus of SH-137. US-60 crosses the Spring River to exit the park. Northeast of Wyandotte, US-60 has a brief concurrency with SH-10. As it approaches the state line, US-60 Business splits from US-60, serving Seneca, Missouri. US-60 then leaves Oklahoma, continuing into Newton County, Missouri.

== History ==
US-60 replaced the entirety of US-164.

US-60 as designated in the original U.S. highway system had a western terminus in Springfield, Missouri. On May 29, 1930, AASHO approved an extension westward to Amarillo, Texas, bringing the route through Oklahoma for the first time. From west to east, US-60 displaced US-164 (from Amarillo to Enid, its entire length), SH-11 (from Ponca City to Pawhuska), and SH-25 (from Pawhuska to Vinita). The section of highway between what was then US-59/US-66/US-69 (now only US-59/US-69) north of Afton and Seneca, Missouri was purpose-built as US-60.

The first two changes to US-60 in Oklahoma after its inception occurred in the northeastern part of the state. The highway's routing through Bartlesville was changed on September 15, 1936. On October 22, 1936, a section of US-60 and SH-48 (the precursor to SH-99 in that area) in Osage County north of Pawhuska was abandoned in favor of a new alignment that led to a new grade separation.

At the request of the Ponca City Chamber of Commerce, the Oklahoma Highway Commission approved several changes to the highway marking in the vicinity of that city. Both US-77 and US-60 had a bypass route marked around town as a "Belt Line", while city routes (the precursor to business routes) were marked through town. The US-60 Belt Line approximated the route of present-day US-60 Business, while the US-60 City Route penetrated further into downtown Ponca City. These routes were established on September 9, 1938.

US-60 would be realigned through many of the towns it served in the late 1940s and early 1950s. The highway was adjusted through Fairland to use Connor Avenue, a shorter, straighter route through town; this change was approved on July 11, 1949. The highway's route through Nowata was altered next, on November 13, 1950. Previously, US-60 followed Delaware Avenue to Oak Street, where it turned south, before turning back to the east on Cherokee Avenue; after the change, it turns south on Pine Street and joins Cherokee Avenue further west. On the same date, the highway was realigned through Bartlesville. The US-60 system through Ponca City was next to be reworked, on July 14, 1952. The previous US-60 and US-77 Belt Line routes and City Routes were removed in favor of a new US-60 route bypassing the city to the south on Harding Avenue and proceeding east across a new Arkansas River bridge—the present day route. Further west, US-60 and US-177 were realigned in Tonkawa on May 4, 1953, replacing an alternate US-60/US-177 that previously paralleled the main highway there.

The mid-1950s saw two alterations of US-60 in rural areas. The first concerned the section of US-60 between then-US-59/US-66/US-69 and Fairland. Previously, US-60 diverged from the other three U.S. routes further north and headed due east towards Fairview. The new (present-day) alignment of US-60, approved December 17, 1956, instead diverged at an interchange also serving the Will Rogers Turnpike, then headed northeast to Fairland. After realignment, the route was 1.4 miles (2.3 km) shorter than before. The next change occurred on April 23, 1957, in Major County, northeast of Orienta. Here, the highway was realigned due to a new bridge over the Cimarron River; the old highway was turned over to Major County to maintain.

On July 17, 1958, the Highway Commission approved a reroute of US-60 and US-81 through Enid. Rather than passing through the north half of the city on Grand Avenue and North Enid Boulevard as the two routes did previously, they now proceeded north along Van Buren Avenue. The next changes to the route occurred in Osage County. A 3.1-mile (5.0 km) segment of US-60/SH-11 west of Pawhuska with many curves was replaced with a newer, straighter alignment on October 6, 1958, with the old highway segment being transferred to the county. Further straightening of the route, further west, was approved on April 3, 1961.

The easternmost stretch of US-60 in Oklahoma was revised in 1965. Previously, US-60 passed directly through Seneca, Missouri. In 1965, the Oklahoma and Missouri Departments of Highways submitted a request to reroute US-60 to the south, and to redesignate a portion of old US-60 serving Seneca, as well as a segment of Missouri Route 43 connecting to the new US-60, as US-60 Business. The remainder of the bypassed portion of US-60 in Missouri, east of Route 43, was to be abandoned. This request was approved by the Oklahoma Highway Commission on March 1, submitted to AASHO on May 5, and approved by AASHO on July 12.

Two realignments to US-60 occurred on March 6, 1967. First, a portion of US-60 west of Nowata was straightened. Second, a segment of US-60/SH-11 east of Burbank was rerouted to the south on a straighter alignment; this new alignment also removed a concurrency with SH-18. On April 3, 1967, the Oklahoma Highway Commission approved a realignment of a short segment of US-60/US-64/US-81 north of Enid in Garfield and Grant Counties. AASHO received applications for both the Burbank and Enid-area relocations on April 24 and approved both of them at the organization's June 20 meeting.

On July 14, 1969, US-60/US-77/US-177 west of Ponca City was moved to a new alignment, and a section of temporary highway linking the new road to the old road continuing west toward Tonkawa had the three U.S. designations applied to it. AASHO received the application for this move on August 25, and it was approved on October 26. Further west, the Oklahoma Department of Highways constructed a section of highway bypassing Tonkawa to the north and east. The Highway Commission approved moving US-60 to this highway and designating the old highway as US-60 Business on August 9, 1971. AASHO received an application for this change on October 8 of that year and approved it on December 4. The section of highway between the Tonkawa bypass and the Ponca City bypass was upgraded next; this road was designated as US-60/US-77/US-177 on November 7, 1974. This change was submitted to AASHO, now renamed to AASHTO, on April 29, 1975, received on May 1, and approved on June 17.

On January 6, 1986, the Oklahoma State Transportation Commission (which had replaced the Highway Commission) approved rerouting US-60/SH-11 on the east side of Pawhuska. While the two highways still passed through Pawhuska from west to east, after turning north, the new route bypassed much of the city. The application for this alteration was submitted to AASHTO on September 22, received the same day, and approved on November 8.

The next change to US-60 did not take place until the 21st century. On March 19, 2001, 0.73 miles (1.17 km) US-60 and SH-51 west of Arnett were moved slightly to connect to a new bridge. Because ODOT demolished the old highway rather than turning it over to Ellis County, this change did not require approval from the Highway Commission. Finally, on October 4, 2004, the Transportation Commission approved the realignment of US-60, US-412, and SH-8 at their junction near Orienta. No further changes to the route are on record.

== Junction list ==
County	Location	mi	km	Destinations	Notes
Oklahoma–Texas line		0.00	0.00	US 60 west – Canadian, Pampa, Amarillo; SH-51 ends	Continuation into Texas; western end of SH-51 concurrency
Ellis		6.7	10.8	US 283	Western end of US-283 concurrency
Ellis	Arnett	12.7	20.4	SH-46	Southern terminus of SH-46
Ellis		13.7	22.0	US 283	Eastern end of US-283 concurrency
Dewey	Vici	39.5	63.6	SH-34	Western end of SH-34 concurrency
Dewey		40.3	64.9	SH-34	Eastern end of SH-34 concurrency
Dewey		58.7	94.5	US 183	
Dewey	Seiling	60.4	97.2	US 270 / SH-3 / SH-51 east / US 281 south (Main Street south) – Watonga, Canton	Eastern end of SH-51 concurrency, southern end of US-270/US-281/SH-3 concurrency
Dewey	Seiling	61.0	98.2	US 270 / SH-3 west – Woodward	Northern end of US-270/SH-3 concurrency
Major	Chester	65.5	105.4	US 281	northern end of US-281 concurrency
Major	Fairview	91.6	147.4	SH-58 south	Western end of SH-58 concurrency
Major	Fairview	92.6	149.0	SH-8 / SH-58 (State Road)	Eastern end of SH-58 concurrency, Western end of SH-8 concurrency
Major	Orienta	98.6	158.7	US 412	Western end of US-412 concurrency
Major		101.6	163.5	SH-8 north	Northern end of SH-8 concurrency
Major	Ringwood	112.3	180.7	SH-58	
Garfield		124.3	200.0	SH-132 south	Western end of SH-132 concurrency
Garfield		125.3	201.7	SH-132 north	Eastern end of SH-132 concurrency
Garfield	Enid	132.3	212.9	US 81 south (Van Buren Street south) / US 412 east (Owen K. Garriot Road east) – Cherokee Strip Regional Heritage Center, Welcome Center	Eastern end of US-412 concurrency; western end of US-81 concurrency; US-412 east provides access to INTEGRIS Bass Baptist Health Center
Garfield	Enid			Chestnut Avenue west	Interchange
Garfield	Enid	136.3	219.4	US 64 east (4th Street) / US 60 west / US 81 south (Van Buren Bypass)	Interchange; eastbound access to US-64 east via U-turn north of exit; southern end of US-64 concurrency
Garfield	Enid	137.7	221.6	SH-45	Eastern terminus of SH-45
Grant		151.7	244.1	US 64 west	Northern end of US-64 concurrency
Grant	Pond Creek	155.8	250.7	US 81 north	Eastern end of US-81 concurrency
Grant		168.9	271.8	SH-74	Western end of SH-74 concurrency
Grant	Lamont	170.8	274.9	SH-74	Eastern end of SH-74 concurrency
Kay	Tonkawa	182.2	293.2	I-35 – Perry, Blackwell	I-35 exit 214
Kay	Tonkawa	184.2	296.4	US 77 south (Main Street) / US 60 Bus. east	Interchange; US-60 Bus. not signed westbound; western end of US-77 concurrency; western terminus of US-60 Bus.
Kay		185.8	299.0	US 177 north / US 60 Bus. east – Blackwell, Tonkawa	Interchange; US-60 Bus. not signed eastbound; western end of US-177 concurrency; eastern terminus of US-60 Bus.
Kay		193.8	311.9	SH-156 south – Marland	Interchange; northern terminus of SH-156
Kay		194.4	312.9	US 60 Bus. east	Interchange; eastbound exit and westbound entrance; western terminus of US-60 Bus.
Kay	Ponca City	197.8	318.3	US 77 north / US 60 Bus. west (Dr. Martin Luther King Jr. Memorial Parkway) / US 177 south (14th Street) – Downtown	Eastern end of US-77/US-177 concurrency, eastern terminus of US-60 Bus.
Osage		219.2	352.8	SH-11 / SH-18	Western end of SH-11 concurrency
Osage	Pawhuska	240.5	387.0	SH-11 / SH-99	Eastern end of SH-11 concurrency, southern end of SH-99 concurrency
Osage		246.0	395.9	SH-99	Northern end of SH-99 concurrency
Osage		253.2	407.5	SH-35	Northern terminus of SH-35
Washington	Bartlesville	263.6	424.2	SH-123	Northern end of SH-123 concurrency
Washington–Osage county line	Bartlesville	263.8	424.5	SH-123	Southern end of SH-123 concurrency
Washington	Bartlesville	267.4	430.3	US 75	Interchange, northern end of US-75 concurrency
Washington	Bartlesville	268.9	432.8	US 75	Southern end of US-75 concurrency
Nowata	Nowata	286.2	460.6	US 169 Alt.	
Nowata	Nowata	286.7	461.4	US 169	
Nowata		294.7	474.3	SH-28	
Craig		309.9	498.7	SH-66	Eastern terminus of SH-66
Craig		311.2	500.8	US 69	Western end of US-69 concurrency
Craig	Vinita	315.1	507.1	SH-2 north (Wilson Street north)	Southern terminus of SH-2
Craig		316.1	508.7	I-44 Toll / Will Rogers Turnpike	I-44 exit 289
Craig		320.5	515.8	SH-82	Northern terminus of SH-82
Delaware		324.9	522.9	SH-85	Northern terminus of SH-85
Ottawa		332.1	534.5	US 59	Western end of US-59 concurrency
Ottawa		332.9	535.8	US 59 / US 69 north / I-44 Toll / Will Rogers Turnpike	Cloverleaf interchange; I-44 exit 302; eastern end of US-59/US-69 concurrency
Ottawa	Fairland	337.3	542.8	SH-125	Western end of SH-125 concurrency
Ottawa	Fairland	337.4	543.0	SH-125	Eastern end of SH-125 concurrency
Ottawa	Twin Bridges State Park	344.0	553.6	SH-137	Southern terminus of SH-137
Ottawa		346.8	558.1	SH-10	Western end of SH-10 concurrency
Ottawa		347.3	558.9	SH-10	Eastern end of SH-10 concurrency
Ottawa		352.0	566.5	US 60 Bus.	Western terminus of US-60 Bus.
Oklahoma–Missouri line		352.3	567.0	US 60 east – Neosho, Aurora, Springfield	Continuation into Seneca, Missouri
1.000 mi = 1.609 km; 1.000 km = 0.621 mi: Concurrency terminus; Incomplete access; Tolled

U.S. Route 60
Previous state: Texas	Oklahoma	Next state: Missouri
