= Dotyville, Oklahoma =

- CDP
- Location within Ottawa County and the state of Oklahoma
- Coordinates: 36°51′05″N 94°54′35″W
- Country: United States
- State: Oklahoma
- County: Ottawa

Area
  - Total: 0.46 sq mi (1.19 km^{2})
  - Land: 0.46 sq mi (1.19 km^{2})
  - Water: 0 sq mi (0.00 km^{2})
- Elevation: 774 ft (236 m)

Population (2020)
  - Total: 89
  - Density: 193.8/sq mi (74.84/km^{2})
- Time zone: UTC-6 (Central (CST))
  - Summer (DST): UTC-5 (CDT)
- FIPS code: 40-21150
- GNIS feature ID: 2408684

Dotyville is a census-designated place (CDP) in Ottawa County, Oklahoma, United States. As of the 2020 census, Dotyville had a population of 89.

== Geography ==
Dotyville is located on Oklahoma State Highway 10, just southwest of Miami across the Neosho River.

According to the United States Census Bureau, the CDP has a total area of 0.9 square miles (2.3 km^{2}), all land.

== Demographics ==
Historical population
Census	Pop.	Note	%±
2000	17		—
2010	87		411.8%
2020	89		2.3%
U.S. Decennial Census

Dotyville is a part of the Joplin, Missouri metropolitan area.

=== 2020 census ===
As of the 2020 census, Dotyville had a population of 89. The median age was 40.8 years. 23.6% of residents were under the age of 18 and 14.6% of residents were 65 years of age or older. For every 100 females there were 161.8 males, and for every 100 females age 18 and over there were 240.0 males age 18 and over.

0.0% of residents lived in urban areas, while 100.0% lived in rural areas.

There were 32 households in Dotyville, of which 6.3% had children under the age of 18 living in them. Of all households, 46.9% were married-couple households, 18.8% were households with a male householder and no spouse or partner present, and 34.4% were households with a female householder and no spouse or partner present. About 46.9% of all households were made up of individuals and 40.7% had someone living alone who was 65 years of age or older.

There were 45 housing units, of which 28.9% were vacant. The homeowner vacancy rate was 0.0% and the rental vacancy rate was 0.0%.

Racial composition as of the 2020 census
Race	Number	Percent
White	62	69.7%
Black or African American	0	0.0%
American Indian and Alaska Native	15	16.9%
Asian	0	0.0%
Native Hawaiian and Other Pacific Islander	1	1.1%
Some other race	2	2.2%
Two or more races	9	10.1%
Hispanic or Latino (of any race)	0	0.0%

=== 2000 census ===
As of the census of 2000, there were 17 people, 7 households, and 7 families residing in the CDP. The population density was 19.2 people per square mile (7.5/km^{2}). There were 7 housing units at an average density of 7.9/sq mi (3.1/km^{2}). The racial makeup of the CDP was 64.71% White, 29.41% Native American, and 5.88% from two or more races.

There were 7 households, out of which 28.6% had children under the age of 18 living with them, 100.0% were married couples living together, and 0.0% were non-families. No households were made up of individuals, and none had someone living alone who was 65 years of age or older. The average household size was 2.43 and the average family size was 2.43.

In the CDP, the population was spread out, with 11.8% under the age of 18, 5.9% from 18 to 24, 5.9% from 25 to 44, 52.9% from 45 to 64, and 23.5% who were 65 years of age or older. The median age was 50 years. For every 100 females, there were 88.9 males. For every 100 females age 18 and over, there were 87.5 males.

The median income for a household in the CDP was $58,750, and the median income for a family was $58,750. Males had a median income of $0 versus $41,250 for females. The per capita income for the CDP was $29,150. None of the population and none of the families were below the poverty line.

== Education ==
The school district is Miami Public Schools.
