= Oklahoma State Highway 85 =

State highway in Oklahoma, United States

State Highway 85

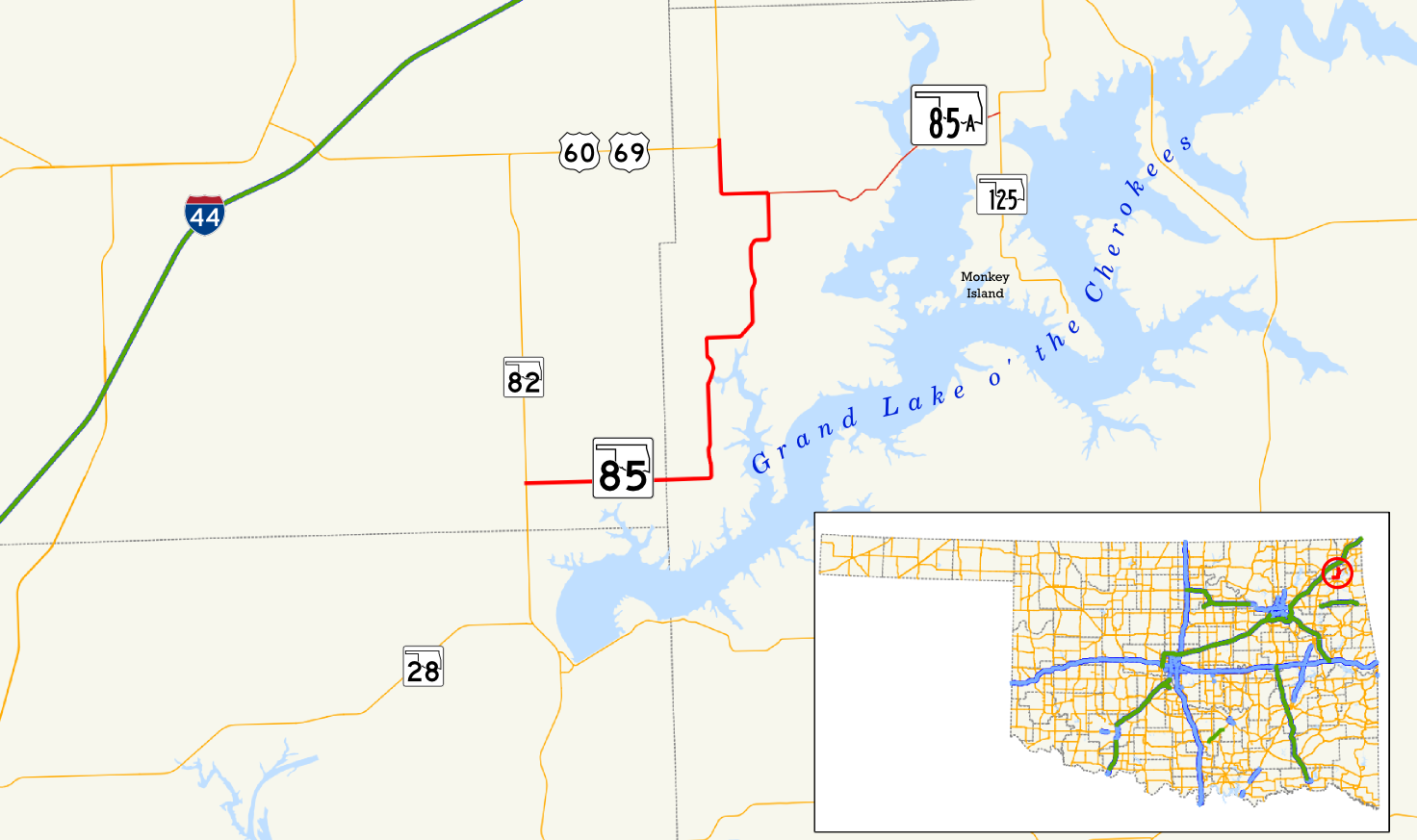

Route information
- Maintained by ODOT
- Length: 13.41 mi (21.58 km)

Major junctions
- South end: SH-82 west of Ketchum
- North end: US 60 / US 69 south of Afton

Location
- Country: United States
- State: Oklahoma

Highway system
- Oklahoma State Highway System; Interstate; US; State; Turnpikes
← SH-84	→ SH-86

State Highway 85 (abbreviated SH-85 or OK-85) is a state highway in the northeastern part of the U.S. state of Oklahoma. The highway is 13.3 miles (21.4 km) long. SH-85 provides access to the northwest shore of Grand Lake, a major recreation center for northwest Oklahoma. SH-85 has one lettered spur highway, SH-85A.

== Route description ==
SH-85 begins at State Highway 82 west of the town of Ketchum, in Craig County. The highway travels east along Ketchum Road into the town. On the east side of Ketchum, SH-85 crosses into Delaware County. Shortly after crossing the county line, the route turns north. The road crosses the Duck Creek arm of Grand Lake, then turns east and then northeast before returning to a due north course. SH-85 then passes through the unincorporated settlement of Cleora. SH-85 then briefly turns east before once again heading north. SH-85 crosses Duck Creek proper near its source.

SH-85 then approaches a T intersection. The eastern leg of the T is SH-85A, while SH-85 follows the west leg of the T. The highway turns north again to intersect US-60/69, where SH-85 ends.

== SH-85A ==
State Highway 85A
- Location: Delaware County
- Length: 5.68 mi (9.14 km)

SH-85A, a 5.68-mile (9.14 km) highway entirely in Delaware County, is the only lettered spur highway from SH-85. It begins at an intersection with SH-85 north of Cleora. The highway travels east to pass through the town of Bernice, on the shores of Grand Lake. The highway crosses an arm of the lake just east of the town. SH-85A then ends at State Highway 125.

== Junction list ==
County	Location	mi	km	Destinations	Notes
Craig		0.0	0.0	SH-82	Southern terminus
Delaware		11.3	18.2	SH-85A	Western terminus of SH-85A
Delaware		13.4	21.6	US 60 / US 69	Northern terminus
1.000 mi = 1.609 km; 1.000 km = 0.621 mi
