= Oklahoma State Highway 123 =

State highway in Oklahoma, United States

State Highway 123

Route information
- Maintained by ODOT
- Length: 22.7 mi (36.5 km)

Major junctions
- South end: SH-11 east of Barnsdall
- US 60 in Bartlesville
- North end: US 75 in Dewey

Location
- Country: United States
- State: Oklahoma

Highway system
- Oklahoma State Highway System; Interstate; US; State; Turnpikes
← SH-120	→ SH-125

State Highway 123 (abbreviated SH-123) is a state highway in the U.S. state of Oklahoma. It runs a general southwest–northeast course for 22.7 miles (36.5 km) in northern Oklahoma. SH-123 has no lettered spur routes.

== Route description ==
SH-123 begins east of Barnsdall, Oklahoma, in Osage County at State Highway 11. It heads north to the Woolaroc Museum before turning northeast. As it approaches the Washington County line, it turns northward to parallel it. SH-123 then enters western Bartlesville, overlapping US-60 for one-fifth of a mile (0.32 km). SH-123 briefly runs east–west before turning north and leaving Bartlesville. It then heads due north until it changes course and runs due east to Dewey, where it terminates at US-75.

== Junction list ==
County	Location	mi	km	Destinations	Notes
Osage	Barnsdall	0.0	0.0	SH-11	Southern terminus
Osage–Washington county line	Bartlesville	17.6	28.3	US 60	Western end of US-60 concurrency
Washington	Bartlesville	17.8	28.6	US 60	Eastern end of US-60 concurrency
Washington	Dewey	22.7	36.5	US 75	Northern terminus
1.000 mi = 1.609 km; 1.000 km = 0.621 mi: Concurrency terminus
