= Oklahoma State Highway 127 =

State highway in Oklahoma, United States

State Highway 127
- SH-127 highlighted in red

Route information
- Maintained by ODOT
- Length: 13.08 mi (21.05 km)
- Existed: c. 1958–present

Major junctions
- West end: US 59 / SH-10 / SH-20 in Jay
- East end: US 59 / SH-10 north of Jay

Location
- Country: United States
- State: Oklahoma

Highway system
- Oklahoma State Highway System; Interstate; US; State; Turnpikes
← SH-125	→ SH-128

State Highway 127 (SH-127) is a state highway in Delaware County, Oklahoma. It runs from US-59/SH-10/SH-20 in Jay, through the community of Zena, and ends at US-59/SH-10 north of Jay. Its total length is 13.08 miles (21.05 km) It has no lettered spur routes.

SH-127 was established as a state highway in the late 1950s. Initially, it was an all-gravel route. By the mid-1970s, the highway had been upgraded to a paved road.

== Route description ==
SH-127 begins in downtown Jay at the intersection of South Main Street (US-59/SH-10/SH-20) and South 5th Street. From this point, SH-127 eastbound proceeds north along South 5th Street to Cherokee Street, where it turns west. It turns back to the north along North 14th Street, which it follows out of Jay. Eastbound SH-127 then turns northwest, passing through a landform known as Muskrat Hollow. The highway then turns to the north, emerging into Courthouse Prairie. It makes a sharp turn to the east, and then to the north, before reaching Zena. It heads generally east from Zena, with four sharp curves between the unincorporated place and the highway's eastern terminus. SH-127 ends at US-59/SH-10 between Jay and Grove. While SH-127 is just over 13 miles (21 km) long, the distance between its two termini along US-59/SH-10 is only 5.6 miles (9.0 km).

== History ==
SH-127 first appears on the state highway map of 1959, following the same general route as it does today, although it was a gravel highway rather than being paved. The first section of the highway to be upgraded was the section between Zena and the eastern terminus; this segment was paved by 1967. The remainder of the route was paved by 1975, resulting in its present-day configuration.

== Junction list ==
The entire route is in Delaware County.

Location	mi	km	Destinations	Notes
Jay	0.00	0.00	US 59 / SH-10 / SH-20	Western terminus
	13.08	21.05	US 59 / SH-10	Eastern terminus
1.000 mi = 1.609 km; 1.000 km = 0.621 mi
