= Cleora, Oklahoma =

- Census-designated place
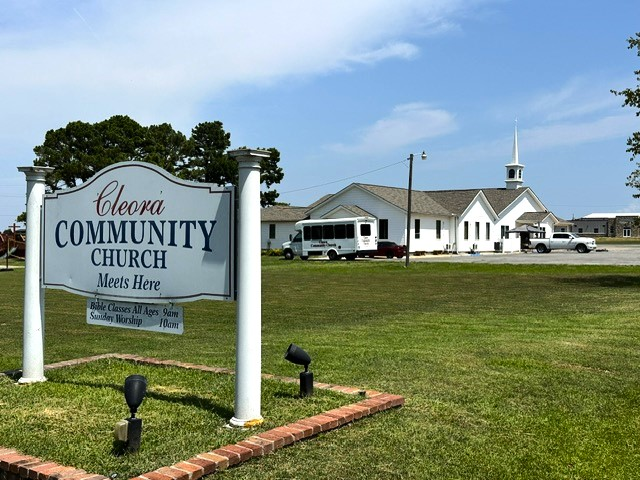
- A church at Cleora in August of 2026

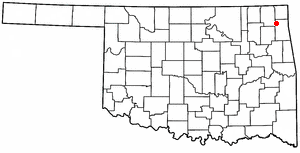
- Location of Cleora, Oklahoma
- Coordinates: 36°34′25″N 94°56′53″W
- Country: United States
- State: Oklahoma
- County: Delaware

Area
  - Total: 12.17 sq mi (31.53 km^{2})
  - Land: 11.85 sq mi (30.70 km^{2})
  - Water: 0.32 sq mi (0.83 km^{2})
- Elevation: 791 ft (241 m)

Population (2020)
  - Total: 1,220
  - Density: 103.0/sq mi (39.75/km^{2})
- Time zone: UTC-6 (Central (CST))
  - Summer (DST): UTC-5 (CDT)
- FIPS code: 40-15250
- GNIS feature ID: 2407633

Cleora is an unincorporated community and census-designated place (CDP) in Delaware County, Oklahoma, United States, along State Highway 85. As of the 2020 census, Cleora had a population of 1,220. The Cleora Post Office existed from November 28, 1900, until October 15, 1954. Cleora was established in District 2 of the old Indian Territory. It was named for Cleora Ann Lunday, sister of the postmaster, Ed Lunday.

== History ==
Few dates are available to detail how the community developed. Settlement began circa 1890, before Oklahoma became a state, and was part of the Cherokee Nation of Indian Territory. The main occupation was farming. The rich soil produced wheat, corn and oats. However, the unnamed community was far from any larger settlements. The local residents had to travel to either Afton or Vinita to either shop or get their mail. Local resident, Ed Lunday, soon built a general store, and was then persuaded by the other residents to apply for a post office. He needed to name the post office before submitting his application, and decided to name it for one of his six sisters. (Note: The Lunday sisters were named Rebecca, Flora, Lula, Rosie, Cleora and Maud. Their names were put in a hat and one name was drawn. Cleora was the winner.) The Cleora post office was established in Lunday's store on November 28, 1900. A school, two churches (Methodist and Christian) and some houses had been built before 1904, when a tornado destroyed the Christian church.

The Kansas, Oklahoma and Gulf Railway (KO&G) built its main line through Cleora in 1910, apparently bringing prosperity in its wake. Sunday's general store moved into a larger building and Bob Aldrich opened a hardware store. Other businesses were a two-story hotel, lumber company, grain elevator and livery stable.

In 1928, residents decided to consolidate the three small school districts of Old Cleota, New Cleota and Walnut Hill.

When planning began for the Pensacola Dam and the Grand Lake o' the Cherokees, it was learned that much of the older sites would be inundated by the project. Although some residents moved to higher ground, many others simply moved away.

== Geography ==
Cleora is located in northwestern Delaware County on the northwest side of the Grand Lake o' the Cherokees. It is 5 miles (8 km) southwest of Bernice, 10 miles (16 km) south of Afton, and 14 miles (23 km) southeast of Vinita.

According to the United States Census Bureau, the CDP has a total area of 12.2 square miles (31.5 km^{2}), of which 11.9 square miles (30.7 km^{2}) is land and 0.31 square miles (0.8 km^{2}), or 2.64%, is water.

== Demographics ==
Historical population
Census	Pop.	Note	%±
2020	1,220		—
U.S. Decennial Census

=== 2020 census ===
As of the 2020 census, Cleora had a population of 1,220. The median age was 60.4 years. 10.0% of residents were under the age of 18 and 40.4% of residents were 65 years of age or older. For every 100 females there were 104.4 males, and for every 100 females age 18 and over there were 100.7 males age 18 and over.

0.0% of residents lived in urban areas, while 100.0% lived in rural areas.

There were 607 households in Cleora, of which 15.0% had children under the age of 18 living in them. Of all households, 55.0% were married-couple households, 18.5% were households with a male householder and no spouse or partner present, and 20.9% were households with a female householder and no spouse or partner present. About 27.1% of all households were made up of individuals and 10.9% had someone living alone who was 65 years of age or older.

There were 1,661 housing units, of which 63.5% were vacant. The homeowner vacancy rate was 2.4% and the rental vacancy rate was 5.4%.

Racial composition as of the 2020 census
Race	Number	Percent
White	984	80.7%
Black or African American	3	0.2%
American Indian and Alaska Native	146	12.0%
Asian	5	0.4%
Native Hawaiian and Other Pacific Islander	0	0.0%
Some other race	3	0.2%
Two or more races	79	6.5%
Hispanic or Latino (of any race)	19	1.6%

=== 2000 census ===
As of the census of 2000, there were 1,113 people, 518 households, and 386 families residing in the community. The population density was 92.3 inhabitants per square mile (35.6/km^{2}). There were 1,326 housing units at an average density of 110.0 per square mile (42.5/km^{2}). The racial makeup of the community was 86.25% White, 0.09% African American, 11.05% Native American, 0.09% from other races, and 2.52% from two or more races. Hispanic or Latino of any race were 0.45% of the population.

There were 518 households, out of which 16.8% had children under the age of 18 living with them, 67.8% were married couples living together, 3.5% had a female householder with no husband present, and 25.3% were non-families. 21.6% of all households were made up of individuals, and 12.4% had someone living alone who was 65 years of age or older. The average household size was 2.15 and the average family size was 2.44.

The population age was spread out, with 14.7% under the age of 18, 4.3% from 18 to 24, 16.3% from 25 to 44, 38.1% from 45 to 64, and 26.6% who were 65 years of age or older. The median age was 54 years. For every 100 females, there were 97.0 males. For every 100 females age 18 and over, there were 93.7 males.

The median income for a household in the community was $35,368, and the median income for a family was $42,411. Males had a median income of $37,411 versus $26,184 for females. The per capita income for the community was $29,245. About 8.0% of families and 9.0% of the population were below the poverty line, including 8.7% of those under age 18 and 5.8% of those age 65 or over.

== Education ==
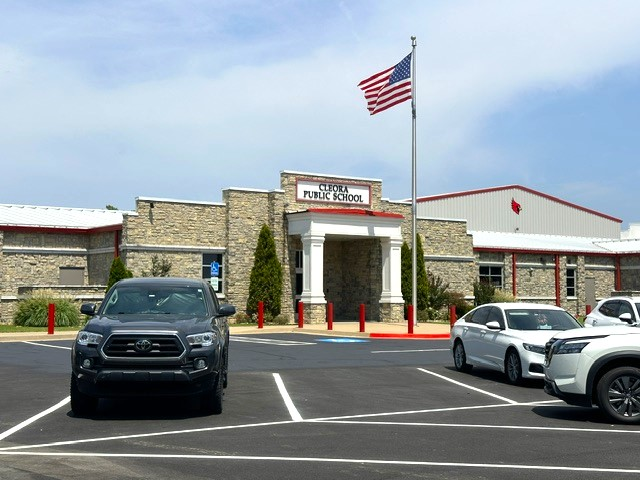
Cleora Public School in August, 2026

Almost all of Cleora is in the Cleora Public School school district, with a piece in the Ketchum Public Schools school district.
