= Oklahoma State Highway 141 =

State highway in Oklahoma, United States

State Highway 141
- SH-141 highlighted in red

Route information
- Maintained by ODOT
- Length: 8.24 mi (13.26 km)
- Existed: 1958–present

Major junctions
- West end: US 59 south of Sallisaw
- East end: US 64 near Gans

Location
- Country: United States
- State: Oklahoma

Highway system
- Oklahoma State Highway System; Interstate; US; State; Turnpikes
← SH-137	→ SH-142

State Highway 141 (SH-141) is an 8.24-mile-long (13.26 km) state highway in Sequoyah Co., Oklahoma, USA. It connects U.S. Route 59 (US-59) to US-64 and runs through Gans. It has no lettered spur routes.

SH-141 was first added to the state highway system in 1958 as a gravel highway and was gradually paved between then and 1966.

== Route description ==
State Highway 141 begins at US-59 east of Robert S. Kerr Lake, south of Sallisaw. From this terminus, SH-141 proceeds due east for about 3 miles (4.8 km). The highway then turns north for about a half mile (0.3 km) before resuming its easterly course. The highway continues east for about 3 miles (4.8 km) more, passing south of Pine Mountain. The highway then turns northeast to pass through the town of Gans, where it crosses a railroad track. Northeast of town, the road turns to the east once again before coming to an end at US-64.

== History ==
SH-141 first appeared on the 1959 official state map, implying that it was commissioned the previous year. At this time, SH-141 had the same extent as it does today, but was completely gravel, and terminated north of Gans rather than turning back east as it does today. By 1961, the highway had been rerouted to end at its current eastern terminus; the portion of highway east of Gans was also paved at this time. In 1966 the remainder of the highway was paved.

== Junction list ==
The entire route is in Sequoyah County.

Location	mi	km	Destinations	Notes
	0.00	0.00	US 59	Western terminus
	8.24	13.26	US 64	Eastern terminus
1.000 mi = 1.609 km; 1.000 km = 0.621 mi
