= Oklahoma State Highway 116 =

State highway in Oklahoma, United States

State Highway 116

Route information
- Maintained by ODOT
- Length: 11.55 mi (18.59 km)

Major junctions
- West end: US 59 / SH-10 west of Colcord
- East end: AR 12 at the Arkansas state line near Tonnece

Location
- Country: United States
- State: Oklahoma

Highway system
- Oklahoma State Highway System; Interstate; US; State; Turnpikes
← SH-115	→ SH-117

State Highway 116 (abbreviated SH-116) is a state highway in Delaware County, Oklahoma, United States. It runs for 11.55 miles (18.59 km) and has no lettered spur routes.

== Route description ==
SH-116 begins at US-59/SH-10 four miles (6 km) west of Colcord. It then runs to the Arkansas state line, where it becomes AR-12, which connects to Rogers, Arkansas.

== Junction list ==
The entire route is in Delaware County.

Location	mi	km	Destinations	Notes
	0.00	0.00	US 59 / SH-10	Western terminus
Oklahoma–Arkansas state line	11.55	18.59	AR 12 continues east into Arkansas	
1.000 mi = 1.609 km; 1.000 km = 0.621 mi
