= Oklahoma State Highway 83 =

Highway in Oklahoma

State Highway 83

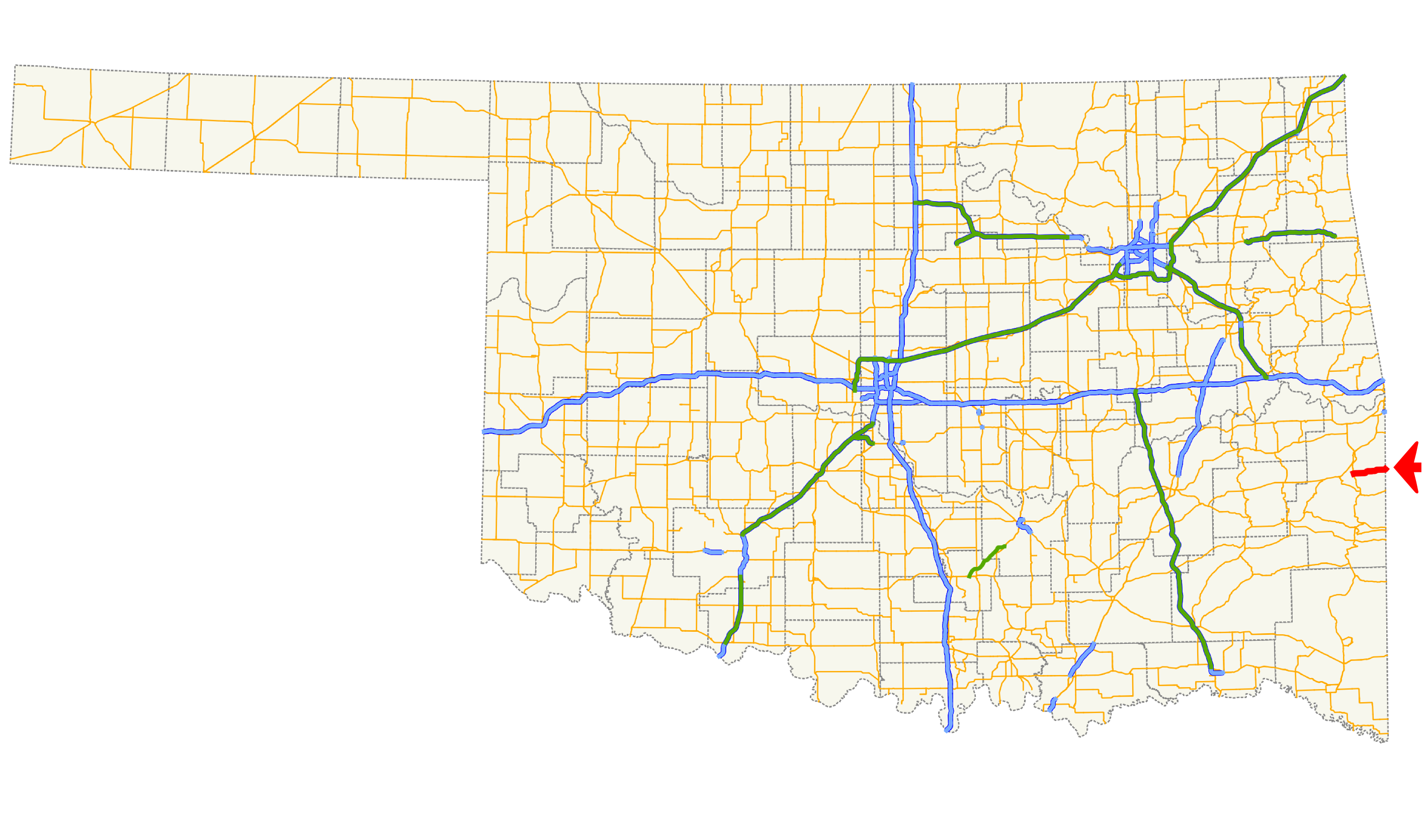

Route information
- Maintained by ODOT
- Length: 11.36 mi (18.28 km)

Major junctions
- West end: US 59 north of Howe
- East end: AR 96 at the Arkansas state line near Monroe

Location
- Country: United States
- State: Oklahoma

Highway system
- Oklahoma State Highway System; Interstate; US; State; Turnpikes
← US 83	→ SH-84

Oklahoma State Highway 83 (abbreviated SH-83) is a state highway in the U.S. state of Oklahoma. The route, which lies entirely within Le Flore County, connects US-59 between Howe and Poteau to the Arkansas state line. Along the way, SH-83 serves the town of Monroe. Its total length is 11.36 miles (18.28 km). The highway has no lettered spur routes.

== Route description ==
SH-83 begins at US-59 north of Howe. The route heads due east of this point, continuing until it reaches an abandoned rail line, where it curves north. SH-83 follows the rail line as the highway turns back east, paralleling Sugar Loaf Creek. The highway enters Monroe, where it forms the north edge of the town. After leaving Monroe, SH-83 turns northeast, away from the railroad. As it angles to the northeast, the route crosses Cowskin Creek, a tributary of Sugar Loaf Creek, before crossing Sugar Loaf Creek itself. SH-83 then returns to a due east course. The road passes south of Sugar Loaf Mountain, elevation 2,564 feet (782 m). The route then turns northeast just before crossing the state line into Sebastian County, Arkansas, where SH-83 ends. The roadbed continues as Arkansas Highway 96.

== Junction list ==
County	Location	mi	km	Destinations	Notes
Le Flore		0.00	0.00	US 59	Western terminus
Oklahoma–Arkansas state line		11.36	18.28	AR 96 continues east into Arkansas	
1.000 mi = 1.609 km; 1.000 km = 0.621 mi
