= Zena, Oklahoma =

Unincorporated community in Oklahoma, US

- CDP
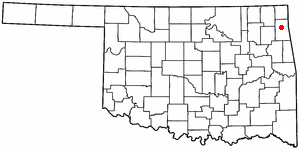
- Location of Zena, Oklahoma
- Coordinates: 36°30′30″N 94°50′53″W
- Country: United States
- State: Oklahoma
- County: Delaware

Area
  - Total: 4.76 sq mi (12.34 km^{2})
  - Land: 4.76 sq mi (12.34 km^{2})
  - Water: 0 sq mi (0.00 km^{2})
- Elevation: 961 ft (293 m)

Population (2020)
  - Total: 181
  - Density: 38.0/sq mi (14.67/km^{2})
- Time zone: UTC-6 (Central (CST))
  - Summer (DST): UTC-5 (CDT)
- FIPS code: 40-83050
- GNIS feature ID: 2409644

Zena is a census-designated place (CDP) in Delaware County, Oklahoma, United States, along State Highway 127. As of the 2020 census, Zena had a population of 181. Established on Courthouse Prairie in District 5 of the old Indian Territory, its post office existed from April 11, 1896, until January 31, 1956.

== Geography ==
According to the United States Census Bureau, the CDP has a total area of 3.5 square miles (9.1 km^{2}), all land.

== Demographics ==
Historical population
Census	Pop.	Note	%±
2020	181		—
U.S. Decennial Census

=== 2020 census ===
As of the 2020 census, Zena had a population of 181. The median age was 55.3 years. 17.1% of residents were under the age of 18 and 32.0% of residents were 65 years of age or older. For every 100 females there were 120.7 males, and for every 100 females age 18 and over there were 127.3 males age 18 and over.

0.0% of residents lived in urban areas, while 100.0% lived in rural areas.

There were 71 households in Zena, of which 15.5% had children under the age of 18 living in them. Of all households, 47.9% were married-couple households, 35.2% were households with a male householder and no spouse or partner present, and 4.2% were households with a female householder and no spouse or partner present. About 38.0% of all households were made up of individuals and 12.7% had someone living alone who was 65 years of age or older.

There were 118 housing units, of which 39.8% were vacant. The homeowner vacancy rate was 0.0% and the rental vacancy rate was 33.3%.

Racial composition as of the 2020 census
Race	Number	Percent
White	124	68.5%
Black or African American	0	0.0%
American Indian and Alaska Native	34	18.8%
Asian	0	0.0%
Native Hawaiian and Other Pacific Islander	0	0.0%
Some other race	5	2.8%
Two or more races	18	9.9%
Hispanic or Latino (of any race)	7	3.9%

=== 2010 census ===
As of the census of 2010, there were 122 people residing in Zena. The population density was 35 people per square mile (13.5/km^{2}). There were 91 housing units at an average density of 24/sq mi (9/km^{2}). The racial makeup of the CDP was 58.54% White, 26.83% Native American, and 14.63% from two or more races. Hispanic or Latino of any race were 0.81% of the population.

There were 50 households, out of which 30.0% had children under the age of 18 living with them, 72.0% were married couples living together, 4.0% had a female householder with no husband present, and 20.0% were non-families. 20.0% of all households were made up of individuals, and 10.0% had someone living alone who was 65 years of age or older. The average household size was 2.46 and the average family size was 2.78.

In the CDP, the population was spread out, with 23.6% under the age of 18, 7.3% from 18 to 24, 26.8% from 25 to 44, 26.8% from 45 to 64, and 15.4% who were 65 years of age or older. The median age was 42 years. For every 100 females, there were 83.6 males. For every 100 females age 18 and over, there were 84.3 males.

The median income for a household in the CDP was $12,500, and the median income for a family was $13,750. Males had a median income of $40,179 versus $9,231 for females. The per capita income for the CDP was $7,656. There were 59.6% of families and 69.8% of the population living below the poverty line, including 86.4% of under eighteens and 80.0% of those over 64.

== Education ==
It is in the Grove Public Schools school district.
