= Copeland, Delaware County, Oklahoma =

Copeland, Oklahoma
- Census-designated place
- Location within the state of Oklahoma
- Coordinates: 36°39′26″N 94°49′14″W
- Country: United States
- State: Oklahoma
- County: Delaware

Area
  - Total: 7.01 sq mi (18.15 km^{2})
  - Land: 6.98 sq mi (18.09 km^{2})
  - Water: 0.023 sq mi (0.06 km^{2})
- Elevation: 787 ft (240 m)

Population (2020)
  - Total: 1,511
  - Density: 216.3/sq mi (83.53/km^{2})
- Time zone: UTC-6 (Central (CST))
  - Summer (DST): UTC-5 (CST)
- FIPS code: 40-17110
- GNIS feature ID: 2407657

Copeland (also Copeland Switch) is an unincorporated community and census-designated place (CDP) in Delaware County, Oklahoma, United States. The population was 1,629 at the 2010 census, a 12.5 percent increase from the figure of 1,448 recorded in 2000. Founded as a railroad community, it was named for local resident D.R. Copeland.

== Geography ==
Copeland is located on the northern edge of Delaware County. It is bordered to the north by Ottawa County. It extends south to the northern shore of Grand Lake o' the Cherokees. U.S. Route 59 passes through the community, leading south 6 miles (10 km) to the city of Grove and northwest 9 miles (14 km) to Interstate 44 near Afton.

According to the United States Census Bureau, the Copeland CDP has a total area of 7.32 square miles (18.95 km^{2}), of which 7.29 square miles (18.89 km^{2}) is land and 0.02 square miles (0.06 km^{2}), or 0.31%, is water.

== Demographics ==
Historical population
| Census | Pop. | Note | %± |
|---|---|---|---|
| 2000 | 1,448 | | — |
| 2010 | 1,629 | | 12.5% |
| 2020 | 1,511 | | −7.2% |
U.S. Decennial Census

As of the census of 2000, there were 1,448 people, 642 households, and 450 families residing in the CDP. The population density was 191.3 inhabitants per square mile (73.9/km^{2}). There were 976 housing units at an average density of 128.9 per square mile (49.8/km^{2}). The racial makeup of the CDP was 82.80% White, 0.41% African American, 11.95% Native American, 0.07% Asian, 0.35% Pacific Islander, 0.55% from other races, and 3.87% from two or more races. Hispanic or Latino of any race were 1.45% of the population.

There were 642 households, out of which 20.6% had children under the age of 18 living with them, 60.6% were married couples living together, 6.1% had a female householder with no husband present, and 29.9% were non-families. 26.0% of all households were made up of individuals, and 10.1% had someone living alone who was 65 years of age or older. The average household size was 2.26 and the average family size was 2.69.

In the CDP, the population was spread out, with 18.9% under the age of 18, 5.1% from 18 to 24, 21.5% from 25 to 44, 32.9% from 45 to 64, and 21.5% who were 65 years of age or older. The median age was 49 years. For every 100 females, there were 103.1 males. For every 100 females age 18 and over, there were 102.1 males.

The median income for a household in the CDP was $22,459, and the median income for a family was $33,071. Males had a median income of $22,560 versus $16,121 for females. The per capita income for the CDP was $16,252. About 13.8% of families and 18.3% of the population were below the poverty line, including 39.1% of those under age 18 and 5.4% of those age 65 or over.

== Education ==
It is in the Grove Public Schools school district.
