= Drowning Creek, Oklahoma =

- Census-designated place
- Location in Oklahoma
- Coordinates: 36°28′40″N 94°53′39″W
- Country: United States
- State: Oklahoma
- County: Delaware

Area
  - Total: 0.89 sq mi (2.30 km^{2})
  - Land: 0.89 sq mi (2.30 km^{2})
  - Water: 0 sq mi (0.00 km^{2})
- Elevation: 837 ft (255 m)

Population (2020)
  - Total: 174
  - Density: 195.9/sq mi (75.62/km^{2})
- Time zone: UTC-6 (Central (CST))
  - Summer (DST): UTC-5 (CDT)
- FIPS code: 40-21676
- GNIS feature ID: 2584378

Drowning Creek is an unincorporated community and census-designated place (CDP) in Delaware County, Oklahoma, United States. As of the 2020 census, Drowning Creek had a population of 174.

== Geography ==
Drowning Creek is located northwest of the center of Delaware County, at the eastern end of an arm of the Grand Lake o' the Cherokees, in the valley of Drowning Creek. It is 6 miles (10 km) northwest of Jay, the county seat.

According to the United States Census Bureau, the Drowning Creek CDP has a total area of 0.89 square miles (2.3 km^{2}), all land.

== Education ==
It is in the Jay Public Schools school district.

== Demographics ==
Historical population
Census	Pop.	Note	%±
2020	174		—
U.S. Decennial Census

=== 2020 census ===
As of the 2020 census, Drowning Creek had a population of 174. The median age was 59.8 years. 11.5% of residents were under the age of 18 and 35.6% of residents were 65 years of age or older. For every 100 females there were 109.6 males, and for every 100 females age 18 and over there were 111.0 males age 18 and over.

0.0% of residents lived in urban areas, while 100.0% lived in rural areas.

There were 94 households in Drowning Creek, of which 18.1% had children under the age of 18 living in them. Of all households, 60.6% were married-couple households, 26.6% were households with a male householder and no spouse or partner present, and 9.6% were households with a female householder and no spouse or partner present. About 27.6% of all households were made up of individuals and 9.6% had someone living alone who was 65 years of age or older.

There were 324 housing units, of which 71.0% were vacant. The homeowner vacancy rate was 0.0% and the rental vacancy rate was 20.0%.

Racial composition as of the 2020 census
Race	Number	Percent
White	127	73.0%
Black or African American	0	0.0%
American Indian and Alaska Native	26	14.9%
Asian	0	0.0%
Native Hawaiian and Other Pacific Islander	0	0.0%
Some other race	1	0.6%
Two or more races	20	11.5%
Hispanic or Latino (of any race)	3	1.7%
