= Oklahoma State Highway 25 =

Highway in Oklahoma

State Highway 25

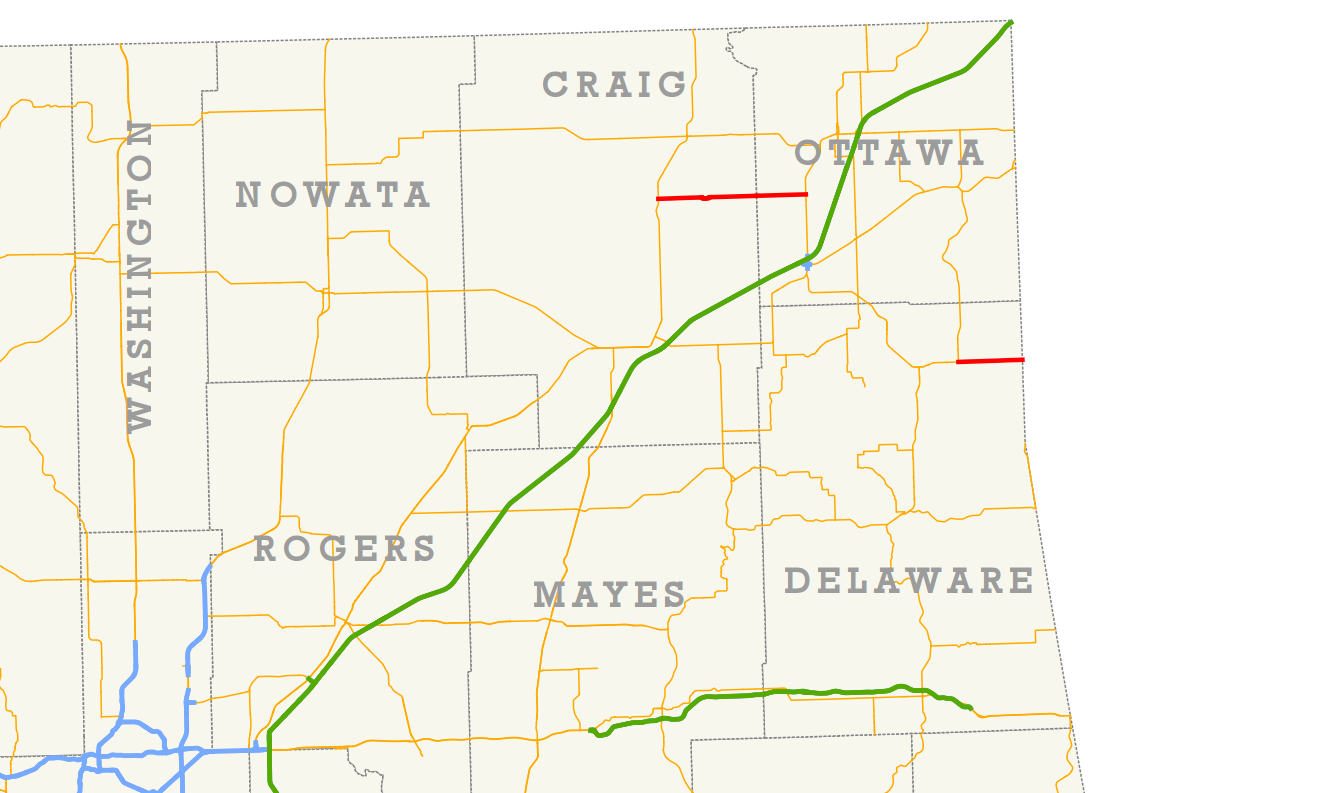

Route information
- Maintained by ODOT

Section 1
- Length: 12.07 mi (19.42 km)
- West end: SH-2 in Pyramid Corners
- East end: US 59 / US 69 in Narcissa

Section 2
- Length: 5.20 mi (8.37 km)
- West end: SH-10 east of Grove
- East end: Route O at the Missouri state line near Dodge

Location
- Country: United States
- State: Oklahoma

Highway system
- Oklahoma State Highway System; Interstate; US; State; Turnpikes
← SH-24	→ SH-26

State Highway 25 (SH-25/OK-25) is a state highway in northeastern Oklahoma with two nonconnecting sections. The northern section runs between the communities of Pyramid Corners and Narcissa, and the southern section runs from east of Grove to the Missouri state line.

== Route description ==
=== Western section ===
The western section of SH-25 runs for 8.07 miles (12.99 km) in Craig County and 4.00 miles (6.44 km) in Ottawa County, giving it a total length of 12.07 miles (19.42 km). The route runs due east–west for its entire extent and is mostly level.

Highway 25 begins at the northern section of SH-2 at the unincorporated place of Pyramid Corners in Craig County. The road passes north of Timber Hill en route to Bluejacket. About 4 miles (6.4 km) east of SH-2, the highway reaches Bluejacket and runs through the town, crossing a railroad line just west of the town. Four miles further east, SH-25 passes into Ottawa County. It then continues for exactly four miles further to its terminus at US-59/US-69 in Narcissa.

=== Eastern section ===
The eastern section of SH-25 is 5.20 miles (8.37 km) long. Like its western twin, the eastern SH-25 is arrow-straight, running due east–west, and experiences no gains or drops of elevation.

This Highway 25 begins three miles (5 km) east of Grove, where SH-10 makes a 90° turn from east–west to north–south; SH-25 continues its east-west path. The highway passes through rural northeastern Delaware County, running through the Cowskin Prairie. SH-25 terminates at the Missouri state line, where it becomes Route O. Route O continues through McDonald County, Missouri, eventually connecting Highway 25 to Route 43.

== Junction lists ==
=== Western section ===
County	Location	mi	km	Destinations	Notes
Craig	Pyramid Corners	0.00	0.00	SH-2	Western terminus
Ottawa	Narcissa	12.07	19.42	US 59 / US 69	Eastern terminus
1.000 mi = 1.609 km; 1.000 km = 0.621 mi

=== Eastern section ===
County	Location	mi	km	Destinations	Notes
Delaware		0.00	0.00	SH-10	Western terminus
Oklahoma–Missouri state line		5.20	8.37	Route O continues east into Missouri	
1.000 mi = 1.609 km; 1.000 km = 0.621 mi
