= Oklahoma State Highway 10 =

Highway in Oklahoma

State Highway 10

Route information
- Maintained by ODOT
- Length: 233.1 mi (375.1 km)
- Existed: August 24, 1924–present

Major junctions
- North end: SH-99 northwest of Bigheart
- US 75 in Copan; US 59 / SH-2 in Welch; US 69 near Miami; I-44 / Will Rogers Turnpike in Miami; US 60 in Wyandotte; US 412 / Cherokee Turnpike in Kansas; US 64 / SH-100 in Gore
- South end: I-40 near Gore

Location
- Country: United States
- State: Oklahoma

Highway system
- Oklahoma State Highway System; Interstate; US; State; Turnpikes
| ← SH-9 | → SH-11 |

State Highway 10 (abbreviated SH-10) is a state highway in northeastern Oklahoma. It makes a 233.1 miles (375.1 km) crescent through the northeast corner of the state, running from SH-99 in Osage County to Interstate 40 (I-40) near Gore. It has two lettered spur routes.

SH-10 first appeared as part of the original highway system designated in 1924. The route originally served eastern Oklahoma as a border-to-border route, connecting the Red River near Hugo to the Missouri state line near Joplin, Missouri. Much of the southern half of the route was dropped in 1941, while western extensions throughout the 1940s brought the highway to its current routing.

== Route description ==
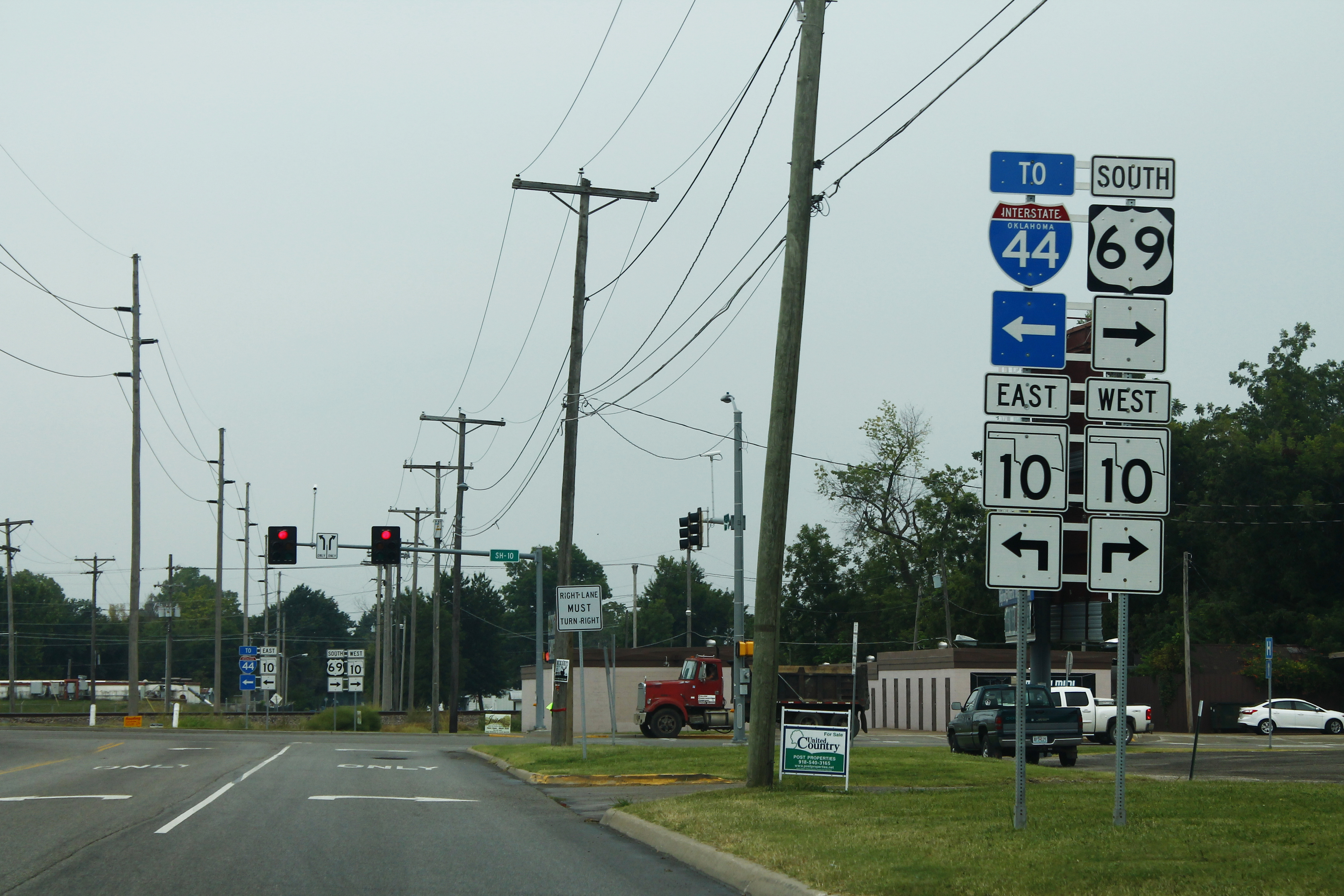
East end of OK 10 and US 69 concurrency

Highway 10 begins at State Highway 99 northwest of the unincorporated town of Bigheart. The highway runs northeast of this point through sparsely populated Osage County. The route runs across the dam forming Lake Hulah and runs through its eponymous unincorporated community. East of this, it crosses into Washington County, where it skirts Copan Lake. The route then proceeds to the town of Copan, where it intersects US-75. SH-10 progresses east to Nowata County, entering the county near Wann, before meeting US-169 around Elliot. It forms a concurrency with US-169 through the town of Lenapah, and splits off and heads due east from there. It does not intersect any highways or pass through any sizeable towns until Welch, where it meets US-59/SH-2. It then continues east to Miami, Oklahoma where it overlaps with US-59/69 and meets State Highway 125. After passing through Miami and passing the northern terminus of State Highway 137, SH-10 reaches its northeasternmost point at the western terminus of SH-10C (see below). After this point, all of SH-10 is north–south.

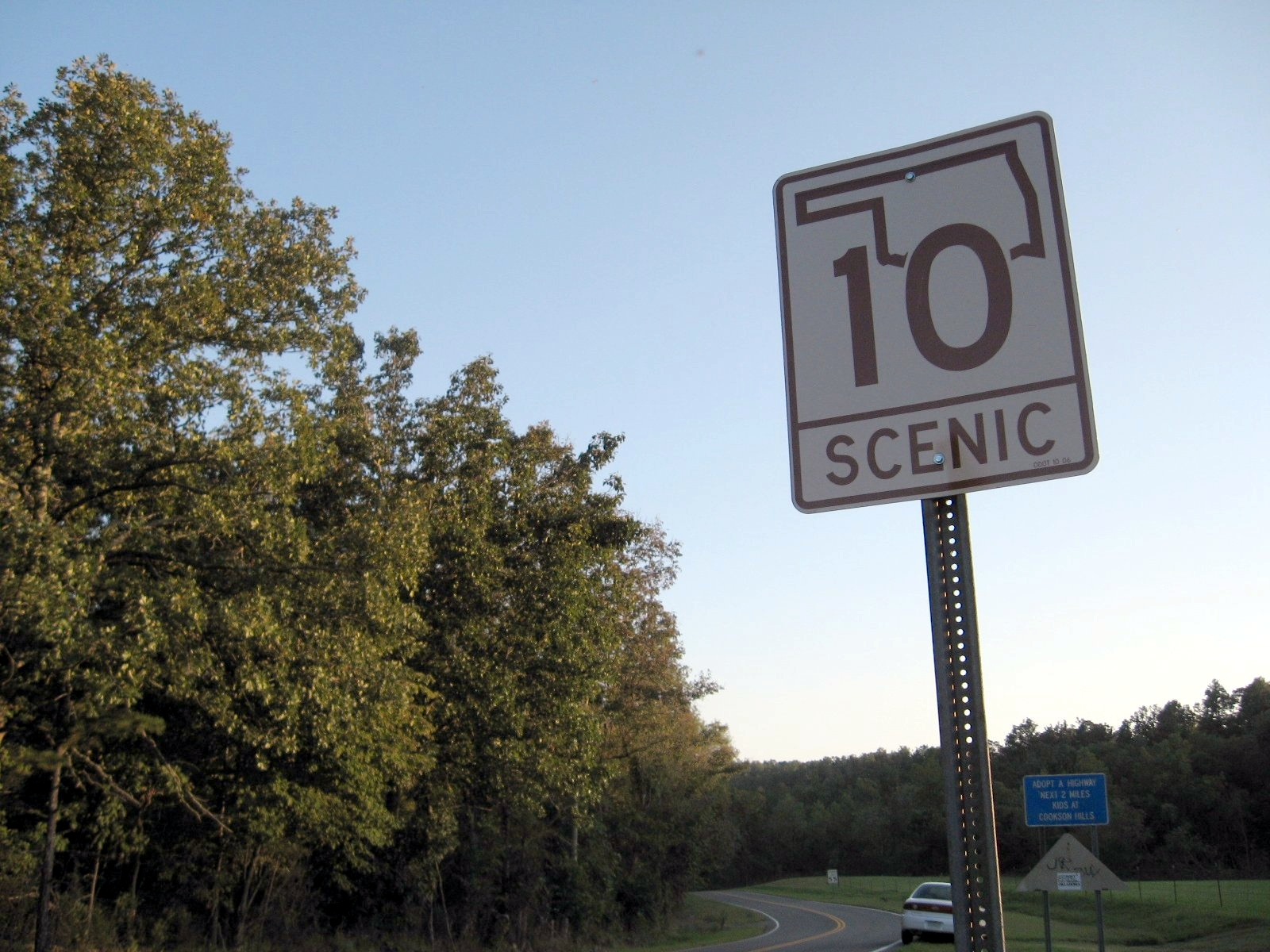
Scenic SH-10 signage in Adair County, north of the Illinois River area.

SH-10 has a brief concurrency with U.S. Highway 60 near Wyandotte. At Wyandotte, the route turns to the south once more for 16 miles (26 km) to its junction with SH-25. From this junction, the route turns to the west for the three-mile (4.8 km) stretch to Grove. Until recently, SH-25 and SH-10 were concurrent along this stretch, but SH-25 now ends at the aforementioned junction. In downtown Grove, SH-10 again joins US-59, and is signed with that highway for 30 miles (48 km) through mostly rural parts of Delaware County, including the county seat, Jay, where State Highway 20 joins with SH-10 and US-59 for approximately two miles.

South of Jay, the route continues south for 17 miles (27 km) to an intersection with SH-116. SH-10 continues south for 3 miles (4.8 km), coming to an interchange with U.S. Highway 412, the Cherokee Turnpike, at the town of Kansas. (US-59 departs just south of the interchange and follows US-412 east toward the Arkansas state line at West Siloam Springs.) SH-10 then begins paralleling the Illinois River, a popular recreation area primarily accessed through SH-10. It then heads westbound at US-62/State Highway 51. SH-10 forms a concurrency with these two highways to Tahlequah, where SH-51 splits off. US-62 and SH-10 remain concurrent until south of Ft. Gibson.

After leaving US-62, SH-10 runs mostly parallel to the Arkansas River, passing through the towns of Braggs, Oklahoma and Gore. It has a brief concurrency with U.S. Highway 64 to cross the Arkansas River, and splits off to the south in Webbers Falls. Just after this it ends at Interstate 40.

== History ==
SH-10 was first added to the state highway system on August 24, 1924. The original route of the highway began at the Texas state line south of Hugo and followed present-day US-271 northward to Spiro, Oklahoma, where it turned west along present-day State Highway 9. The highway then resumed a northbound course along present-day SH-2 to Warner. In Warner, it turned east to follow what is now US-64 to Webbers Falls and Gore. From Gore, it followed its current route to what is now the western terminus of SH-10C. From that intersection, rather than turning west towards Miami, SH-10 continued northeast to end southwest of Joplin, Missouri, approximately where Interstate 44 crosses the state line now. By 1927, however, the northern terminus had been relocated to Miami.

The Miami terminus lasted until January 30, 1930, when the highway was truncated to the US-60 junction near Wyandotte. However, this change would be reversed seven years later; SH-10 once again ended in Miami beginning February 3, 1937. SH-10 was extended to the west for the first time in 1941. The route's western terminus was moved to SH-2 at Welch on April 14, 1941. However, the other terminus was moved north at the end of that year, resulting in SH-10 being truncated to Gore after November 12, 1941. SH-10 was then extended farther west, to US-169 at Lenapah, on April 3, 1944.

A new section of highway, running from SH-99 to Copan, was added to the state highway system on August 21, 1954. This road was also assigned the SH-10 designation, creating a gap in the highway between Copan and Lenapah. This gap would persist until August 3, 1981, when SH-10 was extended east from Copan to US-169, filling the gap. This road is shown as SH-7 on the 1936 and 1937 Oklahoma official highway maps.

Interstate 40 was built through Sequoyah County in the late 1960s. SH-10 was extended from Gore along US-64 to Exit 291 on June 1, 1970. This brought SH-10 to its present-day southern terminus.

The section of SH-10 east of Gore was pressed into service as a detour for I-40 traffic after the collapse of its bridge over the Arkansas River on May 26, 2002. The detour significantly impacted the town of Gore. Local firefighters directed traffic there 24 hours a day, with daytime temperatures approaching 100 °F (38 °C). Businesses in Gore reported loss of revenue due to the traffic; one gas station reported a 30% decline in revenue while traffic was detoured through town. Delays of thirty to fifty minutes on the 12-mile (19 km) detour were typical, although trains passing through Gore could lengthen wait times by 15 minutes.

== Spurs ==
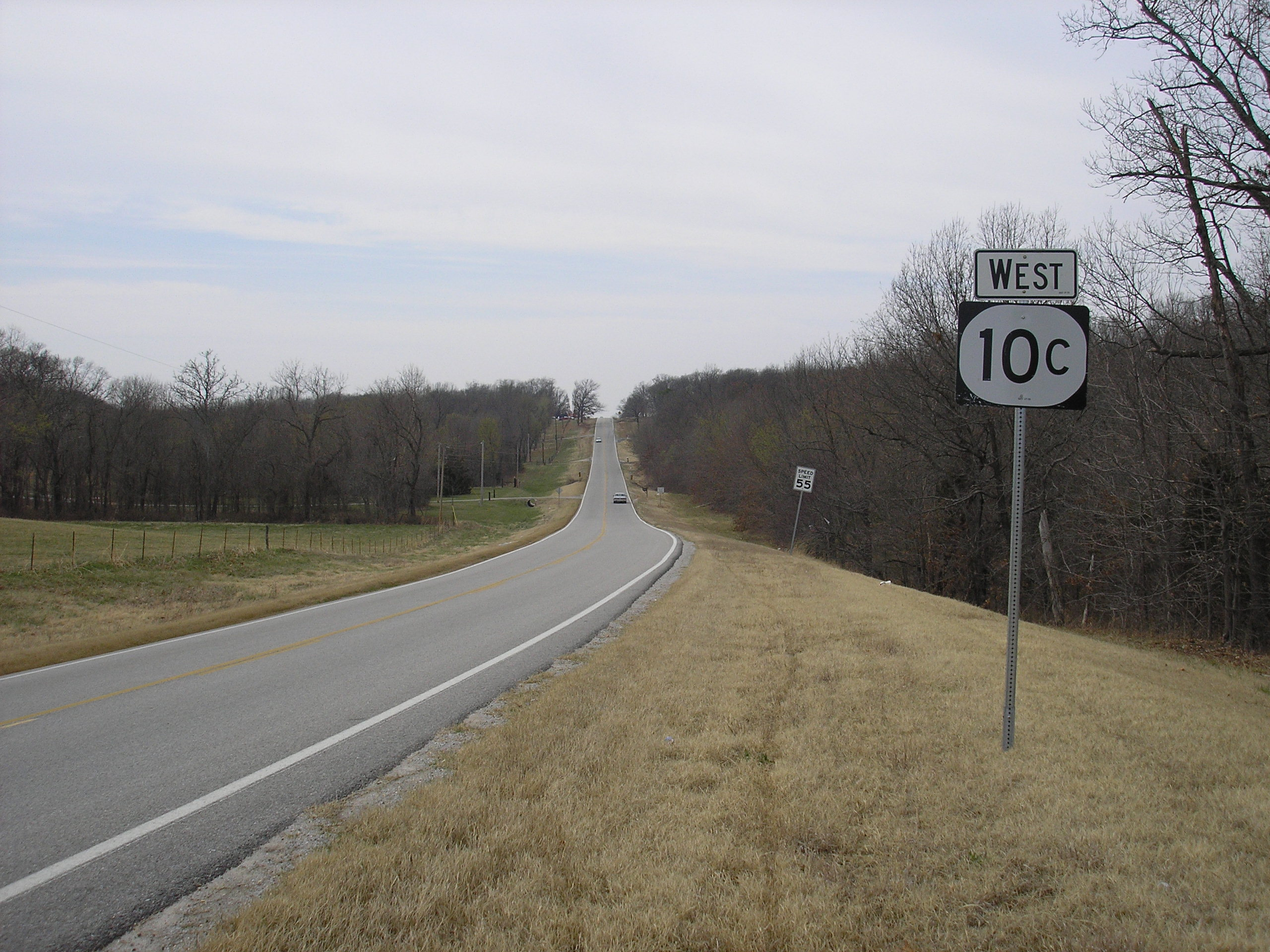
State Highway 10C at the Missouri state line.

- SH-10A (6.3 mi) runs from SH-10 north of Gore to SH-100 near Lake Tenkiller.
- SH-10C (4.4 mi) is a short branch of SH-10 in Ottawa County. Its western terminus is at SH-10, and its eastern terminus is at the Missouri state line, north of Seneca, Missouri. It continues as Missouri Supplemental Route U which runs less than a mile before it ends at Route 43 north of Seneca, Missouri. The highway is relatively straight, though hilly, and no communities are located on the highway.

== Junction list ==
| County | Location | mi | km | Destinations | Notes |
|---|---|---|---|---|---|
| Osage | Bigheart | 0.0 | 0.0 | SH-99 | Western terminus |
| Washington | Copan | 23.1 | 37.2 | US 75 | Southern end of US-75 concurrency |
| Washington | Copan | 24.2 | 38.9 | US 75 | Northern end of US-75 concurrency |
| Nowata | Elliott | 40.6 | 65.3 | US 169 | Northern end of US-169 concurrency |
| Nowata | Lenapah | 45.1 | 72.6 | US 169 | Southern end of US-169 concurrency |
| Craig | Welch | 76.9 | 123.8 | US 59 / SH-2 | Signed northern terminus of SH-2; Western end of US-59 concurrency |
| Ottawa | | 88.1 | 141.8 | US 59 / US 69 | Eastern end of US-59 concurrency, Western end of US-69 concurrency |
| Ottawa | Miami | 89.9 | 144.7 | US 69 / SH-125 | Eastern end of US-69 concurrency, northern terminus of SH-125 |
| Ottawa | Miami | 91.3 | 146.9 | I-44 Toll / Will Rogers Turnpike / SH-69A | Southern terminus of SH-69A; exit 313 on I-44 / Turnpike |
| Ottawa | Ottawa | 94.8 | 152.6 | SH-137 | Northern terminus of SH-137 |
| Ottawa | | 99.7 | 160.5 | SH-10C | Western terminus of SH-10C |
| Ottawa | Wyandotte | 104.4 | 168.0 | US 60 | Northern end of US-60 concurrency |
| Ottawa | Wyandotte | 104.9 | 168.8 | US 60 | Southern end of US-60 concurrency |
| Delaware | | 120.2 | 193.4 | SH-25 | Western terminus of SH-25 |
| Delaware | Grove | 123.5 | 198.8 | US 59 | Northern end of US-59 concurrency |
| Delaware | | 130.4 | 209.9 | SH-127 | Northern terminus of SH-127 |
| Delaware | Jay | 135.5 | 218.1 | SH-20 | Eastern end of SH-20 concurrency |
| Delaware | | 136.0 | 218.9 | SH-127 | Southern terminus of SH-127 |
| Delaware | | 137.7 | 221.6 | SH-20 | Western end of SH-20 concurrency |
| Delaware | | 150.6 | 242.4 | SH-116 | |
| Delaware | Kansas | 154.4 | 248.5 | US 412 / Cherokee Turnpike | Diamond interchange; exit 28 on Cherokee Turnpike |
| Delaware | Kansas | 154.9 | 249.3 | US 59 / US 412 Alt. | Southern end of US-59 concurrency |
| Adair | No major junctions | | | | |
| Cherokee | | 180.5 | 290.5 | US 62 / SH-51 | Eastern end of US-62/SH-51 concurrency |
| Cherokee | Tahlequah | 182.4 | 293.5 | SH-82 | Northern end of SH-82 concurrency |
| Cherokee | Tahlequah | 184.7 | 297.2 | SH-51 / US 62 Bus. north | Western end of SH-51 concurrency; southern terminus of US Bus 62 |
| Cherokee | | 187.0 | 300.9 | SH-82 / US 62 Bus. west | Southern end of SH-82 concurrency; northern terminus of US Bus 62 |
| Muskogee | Fort Gibson | 203.3 | 327.2 | SH-80 | Southern terminus of SH-80 |
| Muskogee | | 205.0 | 329.9 | US 62 | Southern end of US-62 concurrency |
| Muskogee | | 223.3 | 359.4 | SH-10A | Western terminus of SH-10A |
| Sequoyah | Gore | 228.7 | 368.1 | SH-100 | Northern end of SH-100 concurrency |
| Sequoyah | Gore | 229.0 | 368.5 | US 64 / SH-100 | Southern end of SH-100 concurrency, Northern end of US-64 concurrency |
| Sequoyah | | 231.6 | 372.7 | US 64 | Southern end of US-64 concurrency |
| Sequoyah | | 233.1 | 375.1 | I-40 | Southern terminus |
1.000 mi = 1.609 km; 1.000 km = 0.621 mi: Concurrency terminus; Electronic toll collection
