= Narcissa, Oklahoma =

- Census-designated place
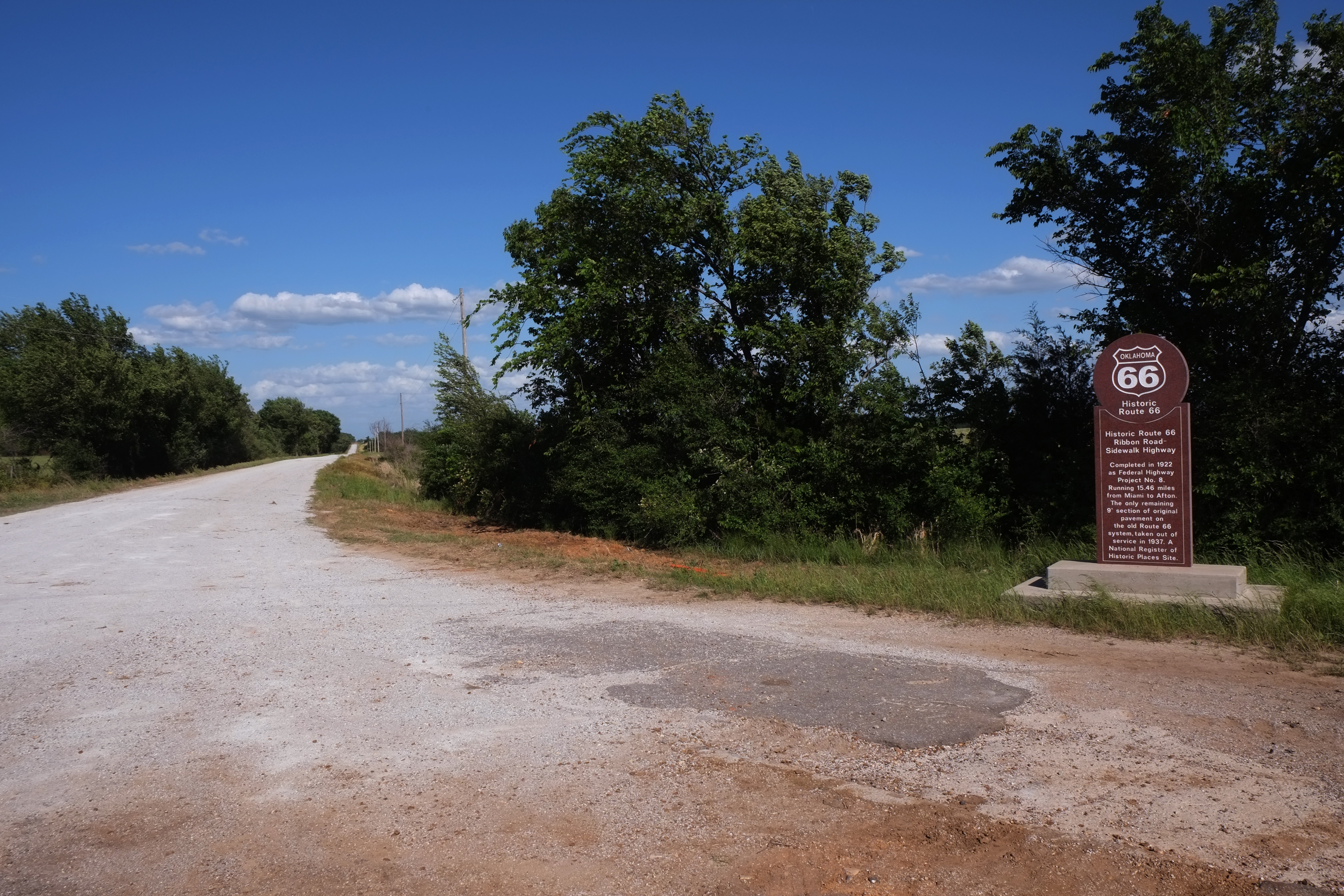

- Location within Ottawa County and the state of Oklahoma
- Coordinates: 36°48′04″N 94°55′40″W
- Country: United States
- State: Oklahoma
- County: Ottawa

Area
  - Total: 4.14 sq mi (10.72 km^{2})
  - Land: 4.14 sq mi (10.72 km^{2})
  - Water: 0 sq mi (0.00 km^{2})
- Elevation: 840 ft (260 m)

Population (2020)
  - Total: 92
  - Density: 22.2/sq mi (8.58/km^{2})
- Time zone: UTC-6 (Central (CST))
  - Summer (DST): UTC-5 (CDT)
- FIPS code: 40-50200
- GNIS feature ID: 2408901

Narcissa is a census-designated place (CDP) in Ottawa County, Oklahoma, United States. The population was 92 at the time of the 2020 United States census.

== History ==
Historic U.S. Route 66 ran through it. The Narcissa D-X Gas Station is listed on the National Register of Historic Places in Ottawa County, Oklahoma.

== Geography ==
Narcissa is located approximately five miles south-southwest of Miami. It is currently served by US Route 59 and Oklahoma State Highway 25, and is just west of Interstate 44.

According to the United States Census Bureau, the CDP has a total area of 4.1 square miles (11 km^{2}), all land.

== Demographics ==
Historical population
Census	Pop.	Note	%±
2000	100		—
2010	101		1.0%
2020	92		−8.9%
U.S. Decennial Census

Narcissa is part of the Joplin, Missouri metropolitan area.

=== 2020 census ===
As of the 2020 census, Narcissa had a population of 92. The median age was 51.3 years. 15.2% of residents were under the age of 18 and 29.3% of residents were 65 years of age or older. For every 100 females there were 95.7 males, and for every 100 females age 18 and over there were 105.3 males age 18 and over.

0.0% of residents lived in urban areas, while 100.0% lived in rural areas.

There were 43 households in Narcissa, of which 34.9% had children under the age of 18 living in them. Of all households, 67.4% were married-couple households, 14.0% were households with a male householder and no spouse or partner present, and 9.3% were households with a female householder and no spouse or partner present. About 14.0% of all households were made up of individuals and 7.0% had someone living alone who was 65 years of age or older.

There were 43 housing units, of which 0.0% were vacant. The homeowner vacancy rate was 0.0% and the rental vacancy rate was 0.0%.

Racial composition as of the 2020 census
Race	Number	Percent
White	72	78.3%
Black or African American	0	0.0%
American Indian and Alaska Native	4	4.3%
Asian	0	0.0%
Native Hawaiian and Other Pacific Islander	1	1.1%
Some other race	1	1.1%
Two or more races	14	15.2%
Hispanic or Latino (of any race)	3	3.3%

=== 2000 census ===
As of the census of 2000, there were 100 people, 41 households, and 27 families residing in the CDP. The population density was 24.2 people per square mile (9.3/km^{2}). There were 42 housing units at an average density of 10.1/sq mi (3.9/km^{2}). The racial makeup of the CDP was 84.00% White, 11.00% Native American, 2.00% Asian, and 3.00% from two or more races. Hispanic or Latino of any race were 1.00% of the population.

There were 41 households, out of which 26.8% had children under the age of 18 living with them, 56.1% were married couples living together, 4.9% had a female householder with no husband present, and 34.1% were non-families. 31.7% of all households were made up of individuals, and 19.5% had someone living alone who was 65 years of age or older. The average household size was 2.44 and the average family size was 2.93.

In the CDP, the population was spread out, with 25.0% under the age of 18, 9.0% from 18 to 24, 19.0% from 25 to 44, 33.0% from 45 to 64, and 14.0% who were 65 years of age or older. The median age was 42 years. For every 100 females, there were 122.2 males. For every 100 females age 18 and over, there were 108.3 males.

The median income for a household in the CDP was $31,500, and the median income for a family was $40,000. Males had a median income of $20,625 versus $22,083 for females. The per capita income for the CDP was $14,852. There were 7.7% of families and 9.1% of the population living below the poverty line, including 17.6% of under eighteens and none of those over 64.

== Education ==
It is within Afton Public Schools.

== See also ==
- List of census-designated places in Oklahoma
