= Twin Bridges State Park =

State park in Oklahoma, United States

- Location within Oklahoma
- Location: Ottawa County, Oklahoma, United States
- Nearest city: Wyandotte, OK
- Coordinates: 36.8014586°N 94.7560627°W
- Area: 63 acres (25 ha)
- Visitors: 171,003 (in 2021)
- Governing body: Oklahoma Tourism and Recreation Department
- Website: www.travelok.com/listings/view.profile/id.8250

The Twin Bridges Area at Grand Lake State Park, previously Twin Bridges State Park, is a park on the north side of the Grand Lake o' the Cherokees in northeastern Oklahoma. It was named for the two bridges that carry U.S. Highway 60 over arms of the lake that connect to the Neosho River and the Spring River. Twin Bridges State Park is known for its quiet country atmosphere and excellent fishing for trophy-sized bass, catfish, bluegill, and spoonbill. A fishing center with bait, tackle, and enclosed fishing dock is within the park. Lighted boat ramps, picnic areas, RV and tent campgrounds, snacks, lake huts, playgrounds, volleyball court, and horseshoe pits are also available. Picnic facilities include tables, individual shelters, and group picnic shelters for larger gatherings. Campsites range from semi-modern RV sites to tent camping and offer comfort stations with showers. The park also offers one-room lake huts with electricity, ceiling fans, and screened windows, grills, tables, water, and restroom facilities. The park is also home to the Wildlife Department's Paddlefish Research & Processing Center, which collects important biological data, processes paddlefish meat for anglers, and salvages paddlefish eggs. The Paddlefish Research & Processing Center is open from February 15 to May 15.

== Fees ==
To help fund a backlog of deferred maintenance and park improvements, the state implemented an entrance fee for this park and 21 others effective June 15, 2020. The fees, charged per vehicle, start at $10 per day for a single-day or $8 for residents with an Oklahoma license plate or Oklahoma tribal plate. Fees are waived for honorably discharged veterans and Oklahoma residents age 62 & older and their spouses. Passes good for three days or a week are also available; annual passes good at all 22 state parks charging fees are offered at a cost of $75 for out-of-state visitors or $60 for Oklahoma residents. The 22 parks are:

- Arrowhead Area at Lake Eufaula State Park
- Beavers Bend State Park
- Boiling Springs State Park
- Cherokee Landing State Park
- Fort Cobb State Park
- Foss State Park
- Honey Creek Area at Grand Lake State Park
- Great Plains State Park
- Great Salt Plains State Park
- Greenleaf State Park
- Keystone State Park
- Lake Eufaula State Park
- Lake Murray State Park
- Lake Texoma State Park
- Lake Thunderbird State Park
- Lake Wister State Park
- Natural Falls State Park
- Osage Hills State Park
- Robbers Cave State Park
- Sequoyah State Park
- Tenkiller State Park
- Twin Bridges Area at Grand Lake State Park
