= Bluejacket, Oklahoma =

Town in Oklahoma, US

- Town
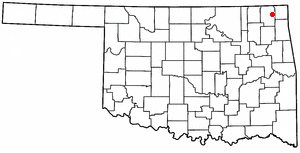
- Location of Bluejacket, Oklahoma
- Coordinates: 36°48′02″N 95°04′27″W
- Country: United States
- State: Oklahoma
- County: Craig

Area
  - Total: 0.44 sq mi (1.13 km^{2})
  - Land: 0.44 sq mi (1.13 km^{2})
  - Water: 0 sq mi (0.00 km^{2})
- Elevation: 778 ft (237 m)

Population (2020)
  - Total: 235
  - Density: 540.2/sq mi (208.59/km^{2})
- Time zone: UTC-6 (Central (CST))
  - Summer (DST): UTC-5 (CDT)
- FIPS code: 40-06950
- GNIS feature ID: 2411701

Bluejacket is a town in eastern Craig County, Oklahoma, United States. As of the 2020 census, Bluejacket had a population of 235.

== History ==
Bluejacket was founded as a station designated by the Missouri, Kansas and Texas Railway (KATY) in 1871, as it built a line through Indian Territory from Kansas to Texas. A post office was established in 1882. The community was named for its first postmaster, the Rev. Charles Blue Jacket, one-time chief of the Shawnee and grandson of noted leader Blue Jacket. The town was incorporated in the Cherokee Nation in 1894.

During the late 1930s, two tornadoes severely damaged Bluejacket. The first, on May 4, 1938, destroyed some barns and killed a farmer and several head of livestock. The second, on August 24, 1939, destroyed much of the business district. This storm killed two young men and caused an estimated half million dollars' worth of damage in the county.

== Geography ==
According to the United States Census Bureau, the town has a total area of 0.4 square miles (1.0 km^{2}), all land. It is approximately 17 miles (27 km) northeast of Vinita, the county seat.

== Demographics ==
Historical population
Census	Pop.	Note	%±
1900	303		—
1910	508		67.7%
1920	442		−13.0%
1930	271		−38.7%
1940	349		28.8%
1950	274		−21.5%
1960	245		−10.6%
1970	234		−4.5%
1980	247		5.6%
1990	175		−29.1%
2000	274		56.6%
2010	339		23.7%
2020	235		−30.7%
U.S. Decennial Census

=== 2020 census ===
As of the 2020 census, Bluejacket had a population of 235. The median age was 47.3 years. 20.4% of residents were under the age of 18 and 23.4% of residents were 65 years of age or older. For every 100 females there were 80.8 males, and for every 100 females age 18 and over there were 73.1 males age 18 and over.

0.0% of residents lived in urban areas, while 100.0% lived in rural areas.

There were 104 households in Bluejacket, of which 35.6% had children under the age of 18 living in them. Of all households, 43.3% were married-couple households, 21.2% were households with a male householder and no spouse or partner present, and 32.7% were households with a female householder and no spouse or partner present. About 21.1% of all households were made up of individuals and 7.7% had someone living alone who was 65 years of age or older.

There were 115 housing units, of which 9.6% were vacant. The homeowner vacancy rate was 2.8% and the rental vacancy rate was 2.7%.

Racial composition as of the 2020 census
Race	Number	Percent
White	139	59.1%
Black or African American	3	1.3%
American Indian and Alaska Native	58	24.7%
Asian	0	0.0%
Native Hawaiian and Other Pacific Islander	0	0.0%
Some other race	0	0.0%
Two or more races	35	14.9%
Hispanic or Latino (of any race)	2	0.9%

=== 2000 census ===
In the census of 2000, there were 274 people, 99 households, and 69 families residing in the town. The population density was 692.2 inhabitants per square mile (267.3/km^{2}). There were 112 housing units at an average density of 283.0 per square mile (109.3/km^{2}). The racial makeup of the town was 66.42% White, 18.25% Native American, 1.09% African American, and 14.23% from two or more races.

There were 99 households, out of which 40.4% had children under the age of 18 living with them, 49.5% were married couples living together, 13.1% had a female householder with no husband present, and 30.3% were non-families. 28.3% of all households were made up of individuals, and 18.2% had someone living alone who was 65 years of age or older. The average household size was 2.72 and the average family size was 3.33.

In the town, the population was spread out, with 31.8% under the age of 18, 9.1% from 18 to 24, 24.5% from 25 to 44, 21.5% from 45 to 64, and 13.1% who were 65 years of age or older. The median age was 34 years. For every 100 females, there were 81.5 males. For every 100 females age 18 and over, there were 81.6 males.

The median income for a household in the town was $26,458, and the median income for a family was $33,250. Males had a median income of $26,000 versus $23,750 for females. The per capita income for the town was $11,755. About 11.3% of families and 14.3% of the population were below the poverty line, including 17.3% of those under the age of eighteen and 30.6% of those 65 or over.

== Education ==
It is in Bluejacket Public Schools.

== Notable people ==
- Fern Holland, a lawyer who was killed in the Iraq conflict
- Martha Goodwin Tunstall, women's suffragist and temperance activist, d. 1911 in Bluejacket
