= List of airports in Oklahoma =

This is a list of airports in Oklahoma (a U.S. state), grouped by type and sorted by location. It contains all public-use and military airports in the state. Some private-use and former airports may be included where notable, such as airports that were previously public-use, those with commercial enplanements recorded by the FAA or airports assigned an IATA airport code.

The largest airport located in the state is OKC Will Rogers International Airport in Oklahoma City.

== Airports ==
This list contains the following information:

- **City served** – The city generally associated with the airport, as per the airport's master record with the Federal Aviation Administration. This is not always the actual location since some airports are located in smaller towns outside of the city they serve. It is not meant to be a complete list of cities served, which can be found in or added to each airport's Wikipedia article.
- **FAA** – The location identifier assigned by the Federal Aviation Administration (FAA). These are linked to each airport's page at the Oklahoma Aeronautics Commission Airport Directory.
- **IATA** – The airport code assigned by the International Air Transport Association (IATA). Those that do not match the FAA code are shown in bold.
- **ICAO** – The location indicator assigned by the International Civil Aviation Organization (ICAO).
- **Airport name** – The official airport name. Those shown in **bold** indicate the airport has scheduled passenger service on commercial airlines.
- **Role** – One of four FAA airport categories, as per the 2021–2025 National Plan of Integrated Airport Systems (NPIAS) report released September 2020:
  - P-s: Commercial service – primary are publicly owned airports that receive scheduled passenger service and have more than 10,000 passenger boardings (enplanements) each year. Each primary airport is sub-classified by the FAA as one of the following four "hub" types (s):
    - L: Large hub that accounts for at least 1% of total U.S. passenger enplanements.
    - M: Medium hub that accounts for between 0.25% and 1% of total U.S. passenger enplanements.
    - S: Small hub that accounts for between 0.05% and 0.25% of total U.S. passenger enplanements.
    - N: Nonhub that accounts for less than 0.05% of total U.S. passenger enplanements, but more than 10,000 annual enplanements.
  - CS: Commercial service – nonprimary are publicly owned airports that receive scheduled passenger service and have at least 2,500 passenger boardings each year.
  - R: Reliever airports are designated by the FAA to relieve congestion at a large commercial service airport and to provide more general aviation access to the overall community.
  - GA: General aviation airports are the largest single group of airports in the U.S. airport system. They are public-use airports that do not have scheduled service or have scheduled service with less than 2,500 passenger boardings each year.
- **Enplanements** – The number of enplanements (commercial passenger boardings) that occurred at the airport in calendar year 2024, as per FAA records released October 2025.

City served	FAA	IATA	ICAO	Airport name	Role	Enplanements (2024)
				**Commercial service – primary airports**		
Lawton	LAW	LAW	KLAW	**Lawton–Fort Sill Regional Airport**	P-N	45,031
Oklahoma City	OKC	OKC	KOKC	**OKC Will Rogers International Airport**	P-S	2,243,575
Stillwater	SWO	SWO	KSWO	**Stillwater Regional Airport**	P-N	34,729
Tulsa	TUL	TUL	KTUL	**Tulsa International Airport**	P-S	1,627,181
				**Reliever airports**		
Norman	OUN	OUN	KOUN	University of Oklahoma Westheimer Airport	R	76
Oklahoma City	PWA	PWA	KPWA	Wiley Post Airport	R	159
Tulsa	RVS	RVS	KRVS	Tulsa Riverside Airport	R	28
				**General aviation airports**		
Ada	ADH	ADT	KADH	Ada Regional Airport	GA	0
Altus	AXS	AXS	KAXS	Altus/Quartz Mountain Regional Airport	GA	0
Alva	AVK		KAVK	Alva Regional Airport	GA	0
Antlers	80F	ATE		Antlers Municipal Airport	GA	0
Ardmore	1F0	AHD		Ardmore Downtown Executive Airport	GA	0
Ardmore	ADM	ADM	KADM	Ardmore Municipal Airport	GA	0
Atoka	AQR		KAQR	Atoka Municipal Airport	GA	0
Bartlesville	BVO	BVO	KBVO	Bartlesville Municipal Airport	GA	27
Beaver	K44			Beaver Municipal Airport	GA	0
Blackwell / Tonkawa	BKN		KBKN	Blackwell–Tonkawa Municipal Airport	GA	0
Boise City	17K			Boise City Airport	GA	0
Bristow	3F7			Jones Memorial Airport	GA	0
Buffalo	BFK		KBFK	Buffalo Municipal Airport	GA	222
Burns Flat	CSM	CSM	KCSM	Clinton-Sherman Airport (at Clinton-Sherman Industrial Airpark)	GA	0
Canadian	91F			Carlton Landing Field	GA	0
Carnegie	86F			Carnegie Municipal Airport	GA	0
Chandler	CQB		KCQB	Chandler Regional Airport	GA	0
Cherokee	4O5			Cherokee Municipal Airport	GA	0
Cheyenne	93F			Mignon Laird Municipal Airport	GA	0
Chickasha	CHK	CHK	KCHK	Chickasha Municipal Airport	GA	0
Claremore	GCM		KGCM	Claremore Regional Airport	GA	0
Cleveland	95F			Cleveland Municipal Airport	GA	0
Clinton	CLK	CLK	KCLK	Clinton Regional Airport	GA	0
Cordell	F36			Cordell Municipal Airport	GA	0
Cushing	CUH	CUH	KCUH	Cushing Municipal Airport	GA	0
Duncan	DUC	DUC	KDUC	Halliburton Field (Duncan Municipal Airport)	GA	0
Durant	DUA	DUA	KDUA	Durant Regional Airport (Eaker Field)	GA	0
El Reno	RQO		KRQO	El Reno Regional Airport	GA	0
Elk City	ELK	ELK	KELK	Elk City Regional Business Airport (was Elk City Municipal)	GA	0
Enid	WDG	WDG	KWDG	Enid Woodring Regional Airport	GA	32
Eufaula	F08			Eufaula Municipal Airport	GA	0
Eufaula	0F7			Fountainhead Lodge Airpark	GA	0
Fairview	6K4			Fairview Municipal Airport	GA	0
Frederick	FDR	FDR	KFDR	Frederick Regional Airport	GA	0
Gage	GAG	GAG	KGAG	Gage Airport	GA	0
Goldsby	1K4			David Jay Perry Airport	GA	0
Grandfield	1O1			Grandfield Municipal Airport	GA	0
Grove	GMJ		KGMJ	Grove Municipal Airport	GA	0
Guthrie	GOK	GOK	KGOK	Guthrie–Edmond Regional Airport (was Guthrie Municipal)	GA	0
Guymon	GUY	GUY	KGUY	Guymon Municipal Airport	GA	0
Healdton	F32			Healdton Municipal Airport	GA	0
Henryetta	F10			Henryetta Municipal Airport	GA	0
Hinton	2O8			Hinton Municipal Airport	GA	0
Hobart	HBR	HBR	KHBR	Hobart Regional Airport	GA	0
Holdenville	F99			Holdenville Municipal Airport	GA	0
Hollis	O35			Hollis Municipal Airport	GA	0
Hominy	H92			Hominy Municipal Airport	GA	0
Hooker	O45			Hooker Municipal Airport	GA	0
Hugo	HHW	HUJ	KHHW	Stan Stamper Municipal Airport	GA	0
Idabel	4O4			McCurtain County Regional Airport	GA	0
Ketchum	1K8			South Grand Lake Regional Airport (was So. Grand Lake Airport)	GA	0
Kingston	F31			Lake Texoma State Park Airport	GA	0
Lindsay	1K2			Lindsay Municipal Airport	GA	0
Madill	1F4			Madill Municipal Airport	GA	0
Mangum	2K4			Scott Field	GA	0
McAlester	MLC	MLC	KMLC	McAlester Regional Airport	GA	0
Medford	O53			Medford Municipal Airport	GA	0
Miami	MIO	MIO	KMIO	Miami Municipal Airport	GA	0
Mooreland	MDF		KMDF	Mooreland Municipal Airport	GA	0
Muskogee	MKO	MKO	KMKO	Muskogee-Davis Regional Airport	GA	0
Okeene	O65			Christman Airfield	GA	0
Okemah	F81			Okemah Municipal Airport	GA	0
Oklahoma City	RCE		KRCE	Clarence E. Page Municipal Airport	GA	0
Okmulgee	OKM	OKM	KOKM	Okmulgee Regional Airport	GA	0
Pauls Valley	PVJ		KPVJ	Pauls Valley Municipal Airport	GA	2
Pawnee	H97			Pawnee Municipal Airport	GA	0
Perry	F22			Perry Municipal Airport	GA	0
Ponca City	PNC	PNC	KPNC	Ponca City Regional Airport	GA	0
Poteau	RKR	RKR	KRKR	Robert S. Kerr Airport	GA	0
Prague	O47			Prague Municipal Airport	GA	0
Pryor	H71			Mid-America Industrial Airport	GA	0
Purcell	3O3			Purcell Municipal Airport (Steven E. Shephard Field)	GA	0
Sallisaw	JSV		KJSV	Sallisaw Municipal Airport	GA	0
Sand Springs	OWP		KOWP	William R. Pogue Municipal Airport	GA	0
Sayre	3O4			Sayre Municipal Airport	GA	0
Seminole	SRE		KSRE	Seminole Municipal Airport	GA	0
Shawnee	SNL	SNL	KSNL	Shawnee Regional Airport	GA	0
Skiatook	2F6			Skiatook Municipal Airport	GA	0
Stigler	GZL		KGZL	Stigler Regional Airport	GA	0
Stroud	SUD	SUD	KSUD	Stroud Municipal Airport	GA	0
Sulphur	F30			Sulphur Municipal Airport	GA	0
Tahlequah	TQH		KTQH	Tahlequah Municipal Airport	GA	0
Talihina	6F1			Talihina Municipal Airport	GA	0
Thomas	1O4			Thomas Municipal Airport	GA	0
Tishomingo	0F9			Tishomingo Airpark	GA	0
Vinita	H04			Vinita Municipal Airport	GA	0
Wagoner	H68			Hefner-Easley Airport	GA	0
Walters	3O5			Walters Municipal Airport	GA	0
Watonga	JWG		KJWG	Watonga Regional Airport	GA	0
Waynoka	1K5			Waynoka Municipal Airport	GA	0
Weatherford	OJA		KOJA	Weatherford Stafford Airport	GA	0
Wilburton	H05			Wilburton Municipal Airport	GA	0
Woodward	WWR	WWR	KWWR	West Woodward Airport	GA	0
				**Other public-use airports** (not listed in NPIAS)		
Afton	3O9			Grand Lake Regional Airport	~~GA~~	
Afton	4O6			Cherokee Seaplane Base		
Anadarko	F68			Anadarko Municipal Airport		
Broken Bow	90F			Broken Bow Airport		
Burneyville	37K			Falconhead Airport		
Chattanooga	92F			Chattanooga Sky Harbor Airport		
Claremore	K11			Sam Riggs Airpark		
Coalgate	08F			City of Coalgate Airport		
Cookson	44M			Tenkiller Lake Airpark		
El Reno	99F			El Reno Airport		
Erick	O13			Haddock Field		
Freedom	K77			Freedom Municipal Airport		
Haskell	2K9			Haskell Airport		
Inola	O18			Buzzards Roost Airport		
Inola	0K6			Dobie's Airport		
Kingfisher	F92			Kingfisher Airport		
Lexington	O44			McCaslin Airport		
Meno	4O7			Decker Field		
Ninnekah	O14			Skyroads Airport		
Nowata	H66			Nowata Municipal Airport	~~GA~~	
Oklahoma City	HSD		KHSD	Sundance Airpark		9
Olustee	F09			Olustee Municipal Airport		
Overbrook	1F1			Lake Murray State Park Airport	~~GA~~	
Owasso	O38			Gundy's Airport		
Pawhuska	H76			Pawhuska Municipal Airport		0
Pond Creek	2K1			Pond Creek Municipal Airport		
Seiling	1S4			Seiling Airport		
Snyder	4O1			Snyder Airport		
Texhoma	K49			Texhoma Municipal Airport		
Tipton	1O8			Tipton Municipal Airport		
Tulsa	1H6			Harvey Young Airport		
Vici	5O1			Vici Municipal Airport		
Westport	4F1			Westport Airport		
				**Other military airports**		
Altus	LTS	LTS	KLTS	Altus Air Force Base		
Cherokee	CKA	CKA	KCKA	Kegelman Air Force Auxiliary Field		
Enid	END	END	KEND	Vance Air Force Base		
Fort Sill	FSI	FSI	KFSI	Henry Post Army Airfield (Fort Sill)		
Lexington	HMY		KHMY	Muldrow Army Heliport		
Oklahoma City	TIK	TIK	KTIK	Tinker Air Force Base		305
				**Notable private-use airports**		
Blackwell	6OK6	BWL		Earl Henry Airport		
				**Notable former airports**		
Afton	~~79F~~			Teramiranda Airport (closed 2009?)		
Davis	~~97F~~			Crazy Horse Municipal Airport		
Idabel	~~IBO~~		~~KIBO~~	Idabel Airport		
Laverne	~~O51~~			Laverne Municipal Airport		
Marietta	~~4O2~~			Love County Airport		
Marietta	~~T40~~			McGehee Catfish Restaurant Airport		
Morris	~~O36~~			Ashley Airport		
Muskogee	HAX	HAX	KHAX	Hatbox Field		
Newkirk	~~4K8~~			Sky Park Airport		
Oklahoma City	OK03			Oklahoma City Downtown Airpark		
Pond Creek	~~O66~~			Homestead Farms Airport		
Stilwell	~~KO11~~			Stilwell/Cherokee Nation Airport		

== See also ==
- Essential Air Service
- Oklahoma World War II Army Airfields
- Wikipedia:WikiProject Aviation/Airline destination lists: North America#Oklahoma
