= K44 =

K44 may refer to:

- BMW K 1300 GT (K44) Touringbike from BMW Motorrad
- K-44 (Kansas highway)
- K-44 truck, an American military truck
- Beaver Municipal Airport (Oklahoma)
- INS Nirghat (K44), a corvette of the Indian Navy
- Kaliber 44, a Polish hip hop band
- Sisu K-44, a Finnish lorry
- Potassium-44, an isotope of potassium
