= O11 =

O11 or O-11 may refer to:

- Curtiss O-11 Falcon, an observation aircraft of the United States Army Air Corps
- HNLMS O 11, a submarine of the Royal Netherlands Navy
- Oxygen-11, an isotope of oxygen
- Stilwell/Cherokee Nation Airport, in Adair County, Oklahoma, United States
- USS O-11 (SS-72), a submarine of the United States Navy
