= KSNL =

KSNL may refer to:

- KSNL-LD, a low-power television station (channel 23, virtual 6) licensed to Salina, Kansas, United States
- Shawnee Regional Airport, in Shawnee, Oklahoma (ICAO code KSNL)
