= CQB (disambiguation) =

CQB may refer to:

- Close-quarters battle, a close combat situation between multiple combatants involving ranged weapons
- "CQB" (The Expanse), an episode of The Expanse
- Chandler Regional Airport, the FAA LID code CQB
- Chicom CQB, a suppressed bullpup submachine gun
- AA-12 CQB, a variant of an automatic combat shotgun Atchisson AA-12
- SWAT 3: Close Quarters Battle or SWAT3:CQB, a tactical shooter video game
