= Scott Field =

Scott Field may refer to:

== People ==
- Scott Field (politician) (1847–1931), Texas state senator, 1887–1891 and U.S. Representative, 1903–1906
- Scott Field (swimmer), who represented South Africa in 2004 Summer Paralympics
- Martin Scott Field, American bishop

== Places ==
- Scott Field (Oklahoma), an airport in Mangum, Oklahoma, United States (FAA: 2K4)
- The name of the playing field at Davis Wade Stadium, the Mississippi State University football stadium. The stadium was known as Scott Field until 2000.
- Former name of Scott Air Force Base, Illinois
  - Scott Field Historic District

== See also ==
- Scott Fields (born 1955), musician
- Scott Fields (American football), American football linebacker
- Scott Fielding, city councillor in Winnipeg, Manitoba, Canada
- Scott Stadium, Charlottesville, Virginia
