= French airships operated by the USN =

Records concerning the history of French airships in US Navy service are fragmentary. A number of airships of various classes were operated by the US Navy (USN) during World War I from the French Naval Base at Paimbœuf, which was designated a US Navy Air Station from 1 March 1918 onward. It appears that at least 13 French manufactured airships were operated by the USN from Paimbœuf; six were eventually shipped to the United States and one was returned to France before the armistice. The Navy operated or ordered four Astra-Torres type airships, one T-2—the Capitaine Caussin, two CM types, and three or four VZ types.

== Astra-Torres airships ==
The Astra-Torres airship was 223 feet (68 m) in length with a diameter of 47.4 feet (14.4 m), and was powered by two engines. The USN operated AT-1, AT-13 and AT-17. AT-18 was ordered but cancelled. Missions were flown by the first two airships during the war and included training, convoy patrol, mine spotting, and anti-submarine operations. There is no record of flights in the United States by the three AT airships which were shipped there after the armistice. AT-1 was stricken from Naval records in July 1920 at the Naval Aircraft Factory; AT-13 was stricken in October 1920 at Hampton Roads, and AT-17 was transferred to the US Army at Langley Field in October 1919.

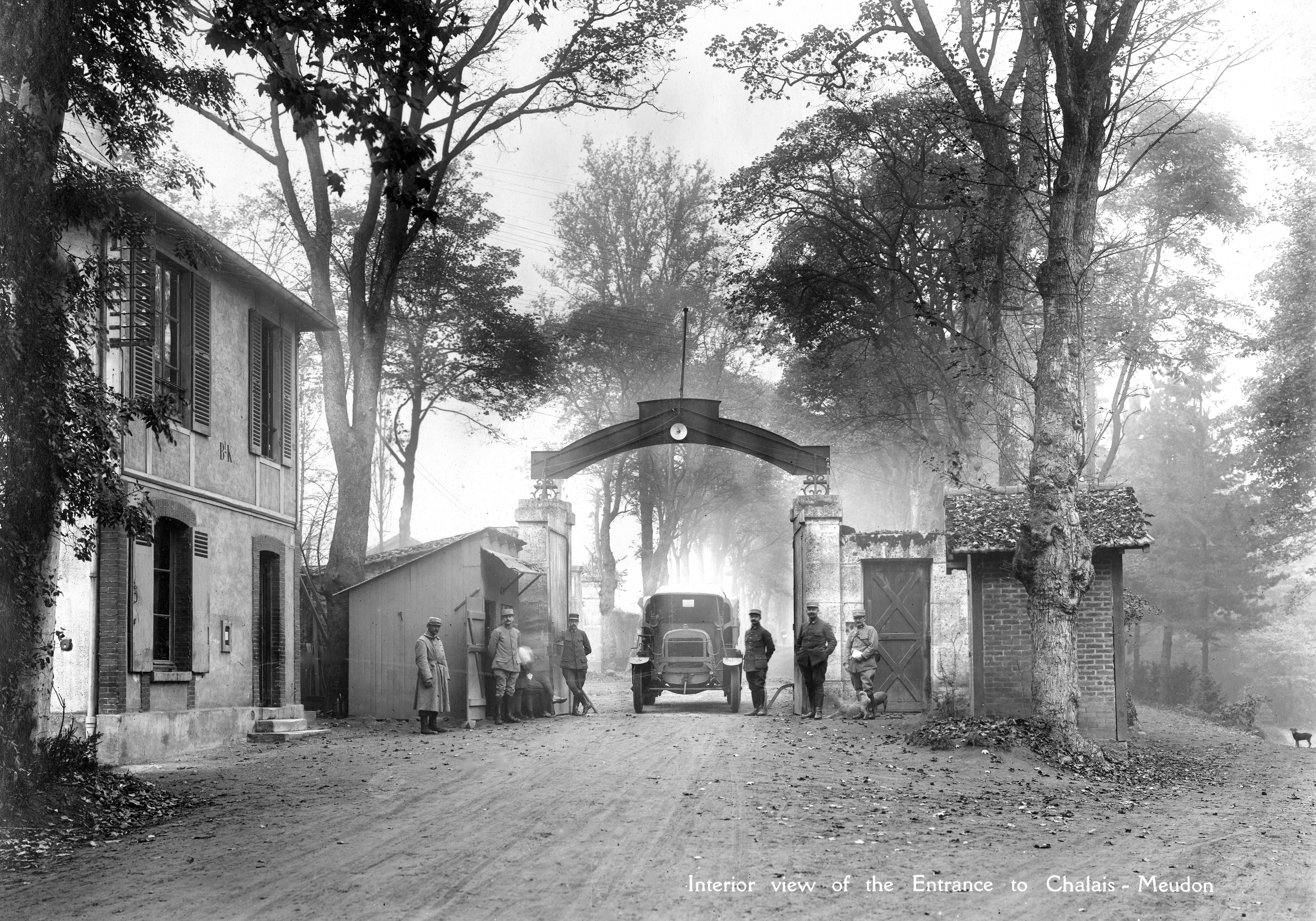
Entrance of Chalais - Meudon France 1918

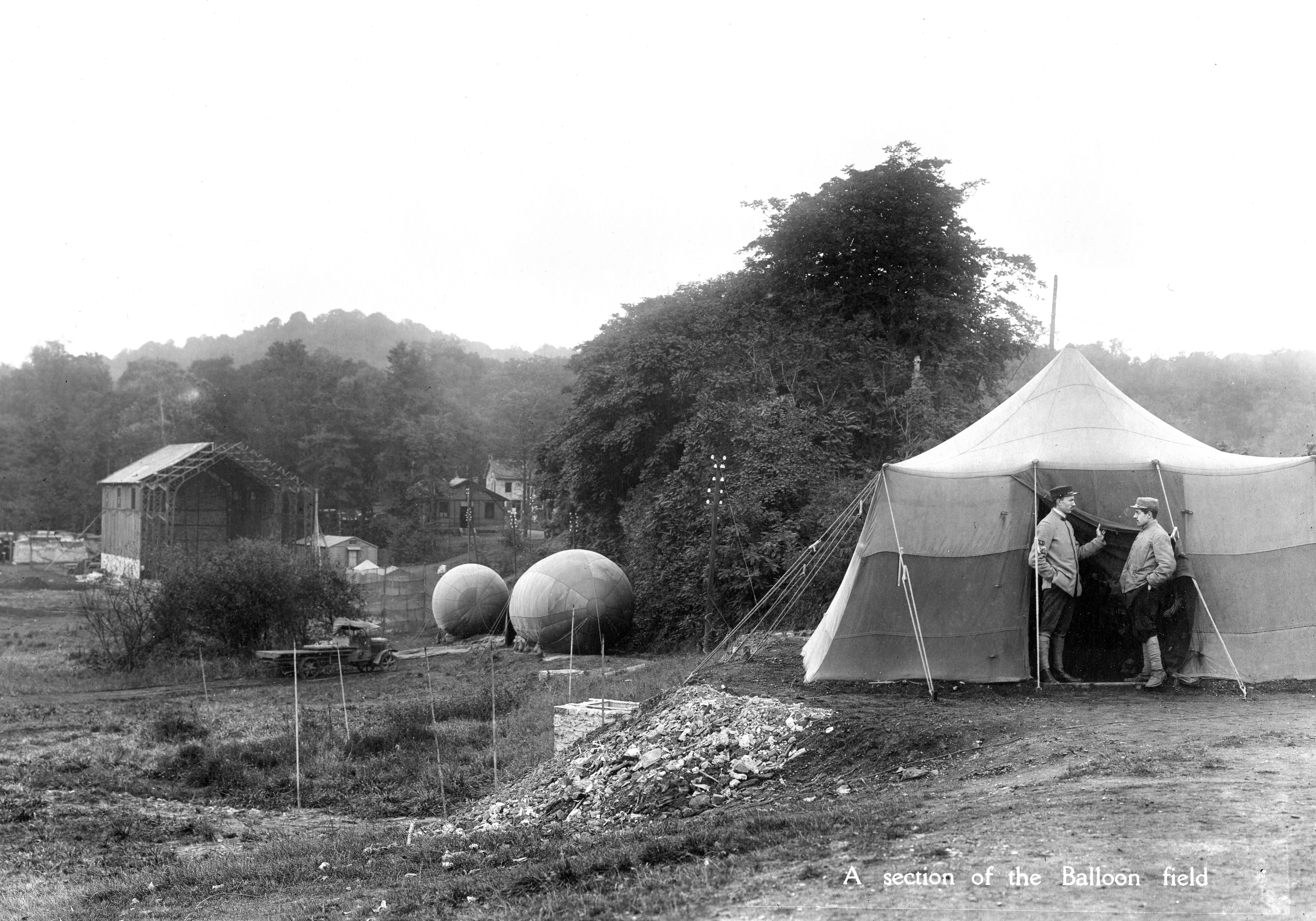
Balloon Field. Chalais - Meudon France 1918

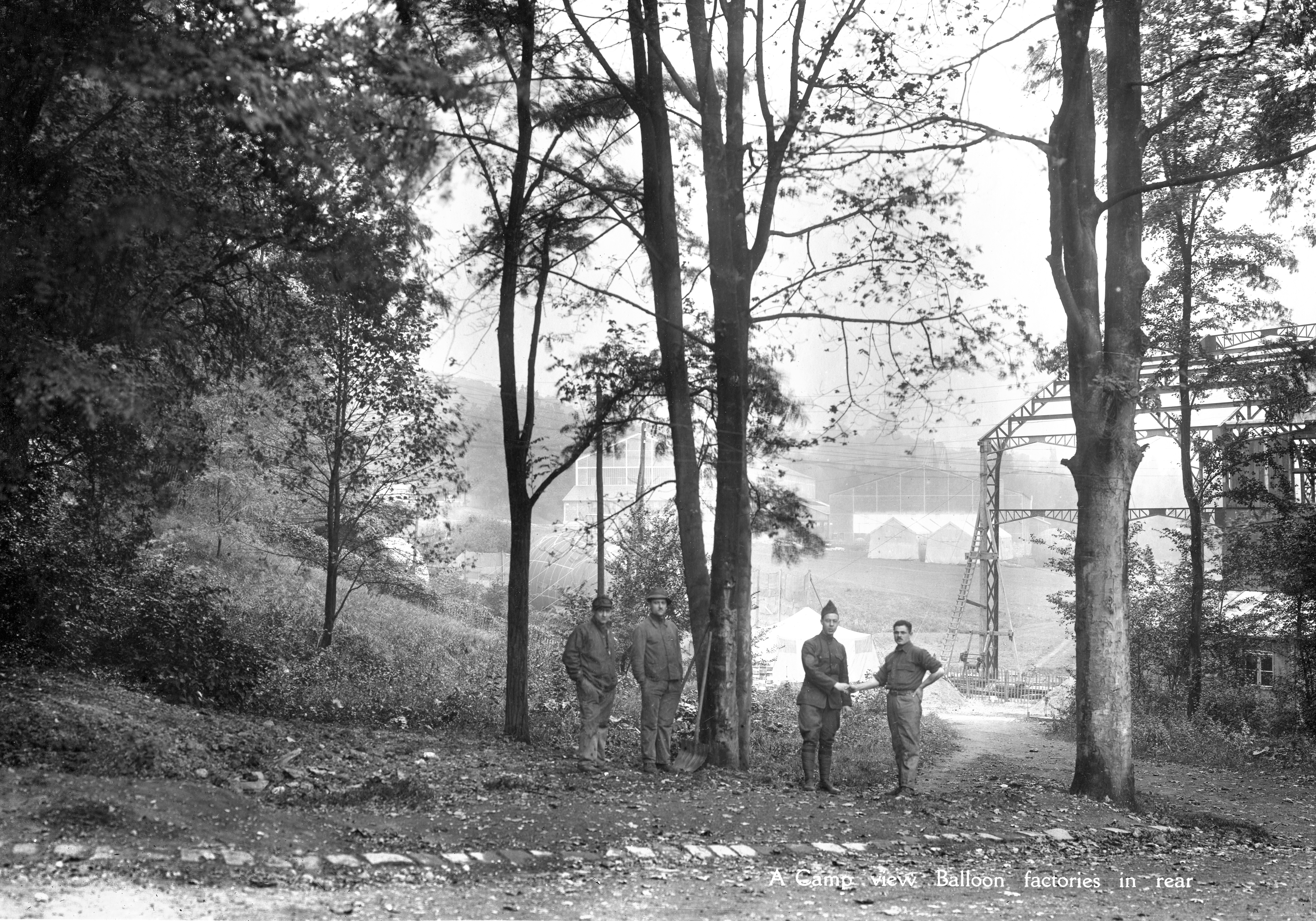
A Camp View with Balloon factories in the background

== Chalais-Meudon (French State Airship Factory) ==
The US Navy purchased the CM-5, which was completed after the armistice. The CM airships were 262.5 feet (80.0 m) long, 45.7 feet (13.9 m) in diameter and were powered by two 230 hp Salmson engines. The CM-5 was shipped to Akron, where it was offered for sale. There is no record of the USN operating the CM-5. One engine car from the CM-5 is in the New England Air Museum at Windsor Locks, Connecticut.

The US Navy also operated a T-2 type Chalais-Meudon airship Capitaine Caussin. The Capitaine Caussin was operated for training at Paimbœuf and Guipavas. In Guipavas it was dismantled, taken to Brest, and loaded on the U.S.S. Wassaic on December 28, 1918, for transport to Hampton Roads, Virginia. Mishandling of the ship's cargo caused considerable damage to the shipping cases carrying the airship's parts. That may explain why the Capitaine Caussin was never reassembled or flown after arriving in Virginia.

== Vedette Zodiac ==
The Zodiac Group built the VZ-7 and VZ-13. Both were operated at NAS Paimboeuf before the armistice and flew combat missions. They were shipped first to Norfolk, and then Coco Solo, where they were scrapped in October 1919. Zodiac VZ-3 was operated by the USN at Paimbœuf during 1918, but was returned to the French in September of that year. The Zodiac ZDUS-1 and ZDUS-2 were ordered by the Navy and shipped to the US. Never operated by the Navy they were both apparently transferred to the Army, and one, the ZDUS-1, was operated by the Army at Langley Field, where the name was changed to ZD-1 and then to RN-1. The RN-1 was rebuilt with a significantly modified and lightened control car and two Liberty engines replacing the Renaults. In 1923 the RN-1 was rebuilt at Scott Field (Oklahoma). A new 340,000-cubic-foot (9,600 m^{3}) envelope was provided, the control car was further modified and the two Liberty engines were replaced by Packards. After four years in service, the RN-1 was placed in storage at Scott Field during 1924 and was eventually scrapped.
