= McCaslin =

McCaslin is a surname. Notable people with the surname include:

- Bob McCaslin Jr. (born 1957), American politician
- Bob McCaslin Sr. (1926–2011), American politician
- Donny McCaslin (born 1966), American jazz saxophonist
- Eugene McCaslin (born 1977), American football player
- Jason McCaslin (born 1980), Canadian musician
- John McCaslin (born 1957), American talk radio host and writer
- Mary McCaslin (born 1946), American folk singer
- Matthew McCaslin (born 1957), American artist
- Richard McCaslin (1964–2018), American criminal
- Susan McCaslin (born 1947), Canadian poet

== See also ==
- McCaslin Airport, an airport in Cleveland County, Oklahoma, United States
- McCaslin Nunatak, a nunatak of Antarctica
