= AXS =

AXS may refer to:

== Anschutz Entertainment Group ==
- AXS (company), primary ticket platform developed by Anschutz Entertainment Group (AEG)
- AXS TV, a cable channel partially owned by Anschutz Entertainment Group (AEG)

== Other ==
- Access (group), a Japanese pop group which once spelled its name AXS
- AXS GmbH, now part of Bruker, a scientific instruments company based in Billerica, Massachusetts, USA
- Altus/Quartz Mountain Regional Airport, Oklahoma, USA (IATA code AXS)
