= Jones Memorial Airport =

- IATA: none; ICAO: none; FAA LID: 3F7

Summary
- Airport type: Public
- Owner: City of Bristow
- Serves: Bristow, Oklahoma
- Elevation AMSL: 869.6 ft (265.1 m)
- Coordinates: 35°48′25″N 096°25′16″W
- Interactive map of Jones Memorial Airport

Runways
Direction	Length		Surface
Direction	ft	m	Surface
18/36	4,001	1,220	Asphalt
- Source: Federal Aviation Administration

Jones Memorial Airport (FAA ID 3F7) is a city-owned, public-use airport located three miles southwest of the central business district of Bristow, a city in Creek County, Oklahoma, United States.

== Facilities and aircraft ==
Operations started in January of 1966.

Jones Memorial currently has one runway designated 18/36 with a 4,001 x 75 ft (1,220 x 23 m) asphalt surface. The previous runway was about 500 feet shorter, and had not been refurbished in about 15 years when a rebuilding project began in 2018. The resulting $3.9 million runway was opened in June of 2020. The airport also received over $2.7 million in late 2020 for taxiway reconstruction. And, a $1.2 million terminal project was begun in 2021, being completed in December of 2022. By the end of the total seven-year construction effort, airport improvements had cost almost $9 million; but, Jones Memorial is calculated to contribute more than $7 million each year to the local economy.

The largest tenant at the airport is Consolidated Turbine Specialists, a Kratos company, being a turboprop engine overhaul and repair organization headquartered in Bristow.

Both 100LL and Jet-A+ fuels are available at the airport.

This facility should not be misidentified as the airfield previously known as Richard Lloyd Jones Jr. Airport, which is about 25 miles northeast in Tulsa, Oklahoma; that airport changed its name to Tulsa Riverside Airport on January 1, 2022, precisely to avoid confusion with Jones Memorial.

== See also ==
- List of airports in Oklahoma
