= Grand Lake Regional Airport =

Airport in Oklahoma, US

- IATA: NRI; ICAO: none; FAA LID: 3O9

Summary
- Airport type: Public use
- Owner: Landings HOA
- Serves: Afton, Oklahoma
- Location: Monkey Island, Oklahoma
- Elevation AMSL: 792 ft (241 m)
- Coordinates: 36°34′39″N 094°51′43″W
- Website: GrandLakeRegionalAirport.com

Map
- Location of airport in Oklahoma 3O9 (the United States)

Runways
Direction	Length		Surface
Direction	ft	m	Surface
17/35	3,925	1,196	Concrete

Statistics (2009)
- Aircraft operations: 7,000
- Based aircraft: 5
- Source: Federal Aviation Administration

Grand Lake Regional Airport (IATA: NRI, FAA LID: 3O9) is a privately owned, public use airport in Delaware County, Oklahoma, United States. It is located on Monkey Island, a peninsula on the northern shore of Grand Lake o' the Cherokees. The airport is nine nautical miles (10 mi, 17 km) southeast of Afton, a city in Ottawa County, Oklahoma.

This airport was included in the National Plan of Integrated Airport Systems for 2007–2011, which categorized it as a general aviation facility.

== Facilities and aircraft ==
Grand Lake Regional Airport covers an area of 60 acres (24 ha) at an elevation of 792 feet (241 m) above mean sea level. It has one runway designated 17/35 with a concrete surface measuring 3,925 by 60 feet (1,196 x 18 m).

For the 12-month period ending October 7, 2009, the airport had 7,000 general aviation aircraft operations, an average of 19 per day. At that time there were 5 aircraft based at this airport: 80% single-engine and 20% multi-engine.

== See also ==
- List of airports in Oklahoma
- Teramiranda Airport
