= Harvey Young Airport =

Airfield in Tulsa, Oklahoma, US

Coordinates: 36°08′21″N 095°49′30″W

Harvey Young Airport (FAA LID: 1H6) was an airfield located at 1500 S. 135th East Avenue in Tulsa, Oklahoma, United States, owned by Aviation Management Group LLC. This is about 8 miles east of downtown Tulsa. The airport featured a 2,580’ x 40’ paved runway, as well as a 2,580’ x 80’ turf runway, both said to be in poor condition (per AirNav.com). It has been removed from all air navigation charts in May 2026.

== History ==
The Tulsa aviation community received Harvey Young Airport as a gift from a local airplane owner, Harvey Young in 1985, the year of his death.

In 1940, aged 22, Young was flying around the Tulsa area and decided to land his plane in a hay meadow east of Tulsa. After pitching a tent, he decided he would build an airport on this land, to which he was able to secure ownership. He claimed to have paid between $85 and $150 an acre.

With the outbreak of World War II, Young was able to receive a government contract training pilots. It is estimated that 5,000 airmen conducted their flight training at Harvey Young Airport. After the conclusion of the war, Spartan School Of Aeronautics leased the airfield for five years for its own pilot training program.

In later times, as many as 180 planes were kept in hangars or tied down at Harvey Young Airport.

In December 1975, a tornado hit the airport causing extensive damage, destroying several hangars and planes, littering the field with pink insulation. Harvey Young Airport, having previously been annexed into Tulsa city limits, was denied federal disaster aid. Young in the aftermath assaulted a Tulsa police officer who arrested him for burning the debris. He was fined $300 for the assault and $50 for burning trash.

Young suffered a stroke and died at age 67 on February 16, 1985. He left a $25,000 trust for Ossie, his pet ocelot. Upon Ossie's death, the remaining funds went to Harvey Young Airport.

On February 22nd, 2025 Harvey Young Airport was closed by NOTAM.

== Community gathering place ==
Young turned part of the 92-acre property into a lake and a children's park, and was known to blast loud music for people over his $7,500 hi-fi stereo system through loudspeakers attached to the roof of his house.

== See also ==
- List of airports in Oklahoma
