= Ardmore Downtown Executive Airport =

- IATA: AHD; ICAO: none; FAA LID: 1F0

Summary
- Airport type: Public
- Owner: City of Ardmore
- Location: Ardmore, Oklahoma
- Elevation AMSL: 844 ft (257 m)
- Coordinates: 34°08′49″N 097°07′22″W
- Interactive map of Ardmore Downtown Executive Airport

Runways
Direction	Length		Surface
Direction	ft	m	Surface
17/35	5,000	1,524	Asphalt

Statistics (2005)
- Aircraft operations: 11,200
- Based aircraft: 43
- Source: Federal Aviation Administration

Ardmore Downtown Executive Airport (IATA: AHD, FAA LID: 1F0) is a city-owned public-use airport located one mile (2 km) southeast of the central business district of Ardmore, a city in Carter County, Oklahoma, United States.

== Facilities and aircraft ==
Ardmore Downtown Executive Airport spans 110 acres (45 ha) and features a single asphalt runway (17/35) measuring 5,000 x 75 ft (1,524 x 23 m). Over the 12 months ending July 5, 2005, the airport recorded 11,200 general aviation aircraft operations, averaging 30 daily. The airport hosts 43 aircraft: 74% single-engine, 14% multi-engine, 5% jet, 5% helicopter, and 2% ultralight.

== See also ==
- List of airports in Oklahoma
