= Durant Regional Airport–Eaker Field =

Airport in Oklahoma, US

Eaker Field
- IATA: DUA; ICAO: KDUA; FAA LID: DUA

Summary
- Airport type: Public
- Owner: City of Durant
- Serves: Durant
- Elevation AMSL: 699 ft (213 m)
- Coordinates: 33°56′32″N 096°23′40″W
- Website: durant.org/...
- Interactive map of Eaker Field

Runways
Direction	Length		Surface
Direction	ft	m	Surface
17/35	6,800	2,072	Asphalt

Statistics (2005)
- Aircraft operations: 46,355
- Based aircraft: 21
- Source: Federal Aviation Administration

Durant Regional Airport–Eaker Field (IATA: DUA, ICAO: KDUA, FAA LID: DUA) is three miles (5 km) south of Durant, Oklahoma. It was established in September 1943. The airport is home to Southeastern Oklahoma State University's Aviation Sciences Institute.

== History ==
The airport is named for SOSU alum General Ira Eaker, a 1917 graduate of Southeastern who served in World War I and World War II. During World War II, General Eaker was commander of the Eighth Air Force in England and led several historic bombing missions against targets in occupied Europe and Germany.

The City of Durant named an airfield west of town in honor of then Captain Eaker in the 1930s. The U.S. Navy built the current airfield as an auxiliary field during World War II and it became Durant Municipal Airport after the war. It was later renamed Eaker Field.

The airport was served by Central Airlines from October 1949 until August 1954. Central initially operated only Beechcraft Bonanzas but phased them out in 1950–1951 in favor of the Douglas DC-3.

== Facilities ==
Eaker Field covers 840 acres (3.4 km^{2}) and has one asphalt runway. Runway 17/35 is 6,800 x 100 ft (1,524.3 x 30.5 m).

In 2005, the airport had 46,355 aircraft operations, average 127 per day: 97.8% general aviation, 2.2% general aviation itinerant, 0.1% military. 21 aircraft were then based at the airport: 17 single-engine, 3 multi-engine, and 1 jet.

== Expansion ==
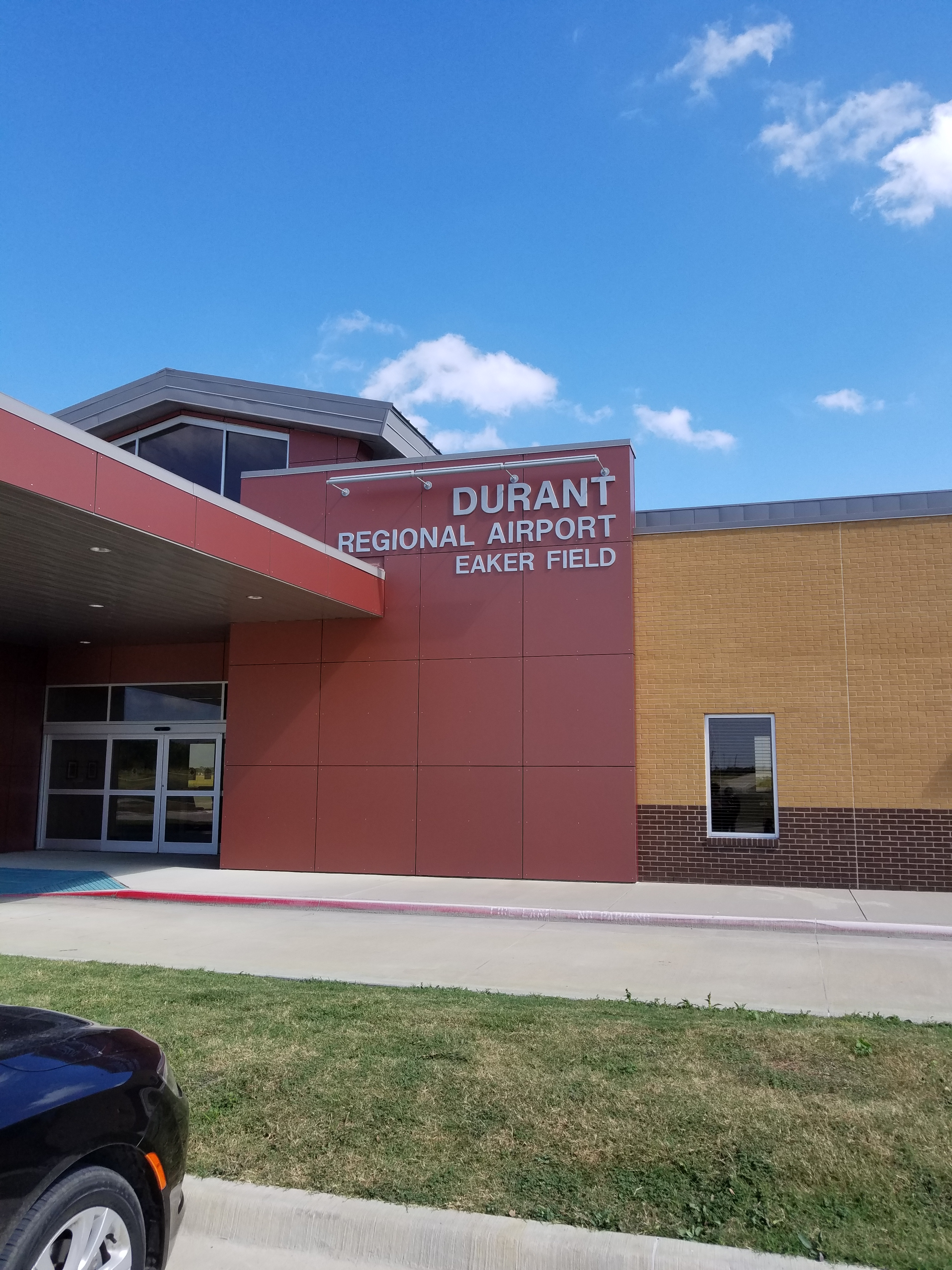
The Eaker Field Airport Terminal.

On February 11, 2011, Eaker Field opened a new, modern 8,000 sq ft (740 m^{2}) terminal building. The project was funded by the Durant Industrial Authority and by a grant provided by the Oklahoma Aeronautics Commission. The taxiway was also resurfaced for the first time since 1943.

The original design called for an air traffic control tower to be added, but that plan was later scrapped due to the cost.

== See also ==
- List of airports in Oklahoma
