= South Grand Lake Regional Airport =

Airport in Oklahoma, United States

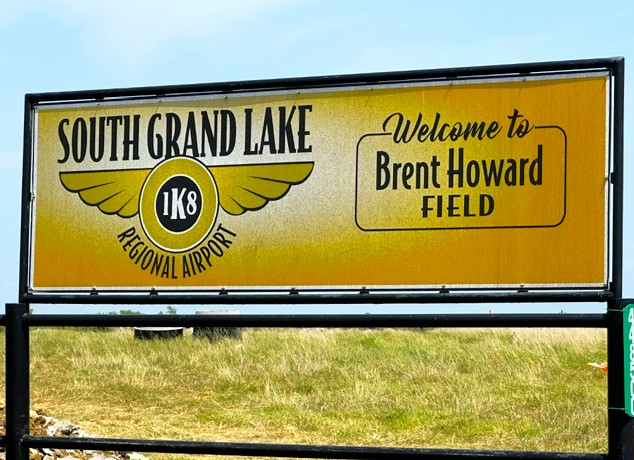
- IATA: none; ICAO: none; FAA LID: 1K8

Summary
- Airport type: Public
- Owner: Town of Ketchum
- Serves: Ketchum, Oklahoma
- Elevation AMSL: 775 ft (236 m)
- Coordinates: 36°32′30″N 095°01′16″W

Map
- Location of airport in Oklahoma

Runways
Direction	Length		Surface
Direction	ft	m	Surface
18/36	4,744	1,446	Asphalt

Statistics (2010)
- Aircraft operations: 7,500
- Source: Federal Aviation Administration

South Grand Lake Regional Airport (FAA LID: 1K8) is a town owned, public use airport located one nautical mile (2 km) northeast of the central business district of Ketchum, a town in Craig County, Oklahoma, United States. It is included in the National Plan of Integrated Airport Systems for 2011–2015, which categorized it as a general aviation facility.

== Facilities and aircraft ==
South Grand Lake Regional Airport covers an area of 57 acres (23 ha) at an elevation of 775 feet (236 m) above mean sea level. It has one runway designated 18/36 with an asphalt surface measuring 4,744 by 60 feet (1,446 by 18 m). For the 12-month period ending December 1, 2010, the airport had 7,500 general aviation aircraft operations, an average of 20 per day.

== See also ==
- List of airports in Oklahoma
