= Tahlequah Municipal Airport =

Airport in Oklahoma, United States

- IATA: none; ICAO: KTQH; FAA LID: TQH

Summary
- Airport type: Public
- Owner: City of Tahlequah
- Serves: Tahlequah, Oklahoma
- Elevation AMSL: 874 ft (266 m)
- Coordinates: 35°55′49″N 095°00′16″W

Map
- Location of airport in Oklahoma TQH (the United States)

Runways
Direction	Length		Surface
Direction	ft	m	Surface
17/35	5,001	1,524	Asphalt

Statistics (2011)
- Aircraft operations: 15,400
- Based aircraft: 43
- Source: Federal Aviation Administration

Tahlequah Municipal Airport (ICAO: KTQH, FAA LID: TQH) is a city-owned, public-use airport located two nautical miles (4 km) northwest of the central business district of Tahlequah, a city in Cherokee County, Oklahoma, United States. It is included in the National Plan of Integrated Airport Systems for 2011–2015, which categorized it as a general aviation facility.

Although most U.S. airports use the same three-letter location identifier for the FAA and IATA, this airport is assigned TQH by the FAA, but has no designation from the IATA.

== Facilities and aircraft ==
Tahlequah Municipal Airport covers an area of 125 acres (51 ha) at an elevation of 874 feet (266 m) above mean sea level. It has one runway designated 17/35 with an asphalt surface measuring 5,001 by 75 feet (1,524 x 23 m).

For the 12-month period ending September 22, 2011, the airport had 15,400 general aviation aircraft operations, an average of 42 per day. At that time there were 43 aircraft based at this airport: 86% single-engine, 12% multi-engine, and 2% helicopter.

== See also ==
- List of airports in Oklahoma
