= Medford Municipal Airport =

Airport in Oklahoma, United States

- IATA: none; ICAO: none; FAA LID: O53

Summary
- Airport type: Public
- Owner: City of Medford
- Serves: Medford, Oklahoma
- Elevation AMSL: 1,092 ft (333 m)
- Coordinates: 36°47′26″N 097°44′56″W

Map
- Location of airport in Oklahoma O53 (the United States)

Runways
Direction	Length		Surface
Direction	ft	m	Surface
17/35	3,007	917	Asphalt

Statistics (2009)
- Aircraft operations: 1,000
- Based aircraft: 14
- Source: Federal Aviation Administration

Medford Municipal Airport (FAA LID: O53) is a city-owned, public-use airport located one nautical mile (2 km) southwest of the central business district of Medford, a city in Grant County, Oklahoma, United States. It is included in the National Plan of Integrated Airport Systems for 2011–2015, which categorized it as a general aviation facility.

== Facilities and aircraft ==
Medford Municipal Airport covers an area of 127 acres (51 ha) at an elevation of 1,092 feet (333 m) above mean sea level. It has one runway designated 17/35 with an asphalt surface measuring 3,007 by 60 feet (917 x 18 m).

For the 12-month period ending February 17, 2009, the airport had 1,000 general aviation aircraft operations, an average of 83 per month. At that time there were 14 aircraft based at this airport, all single-engine.

== See also ==
- List of airports in Oklahoma
