= Cherokee Seaplane Base =

Seaplane base in Oklahoma, US

- IATA: none; ICAO: none; FAA LID: 4O6

Summary
- Airport type: Public use
- Owner: R. A. Billingsley
- Serves: Afton, Oklahoma
- Elevation AMSL: 739 ft (225 m)
- Coordinates: 36°35′00″N 094°55′01″W

Map
- Location of airport in Oklahoma 4O6 (the United States)

Runways
Direction	Length		Surface
Direction	ft	m	Surface
ALL/WAY	10,000	3,048	Water
NE/SW	4,000	1,219	Water

Statistics (2007)
- Aircraft operations: 1,100
- Source: Federal Aviation Administration

Cherokee Seaplane Base (FAA LID: 4O6) is a privately owned, public use seaplane base on Grand Lake o' the Cherokees in Delaware County, Oklahoma. It is located seven nautical miles (8 mi, 13 km) southwest of the central business district of Afton, a city in Ottawa County, Oklahoma.

== Facilities and aircraft ==
Cherokee Seaplane Base covers an area of 12 acres (5 ha) at an elevation of 739 feet (225 m) above mean sea level. It has two water landing areas, one designated ALL/WAY which measures 10,000 by 800 feet (3,048 x 244 m) and another designated NE/SW is 4,000 by 200 feet (1,219 x 61 m). For the 12-month period ending April 17, 2007, the facility had 1,100 general aviation aircraft operations, an average of 91 per month.

== See also ==
- List of airports in Oklahoma
