= Sallisaw Municipal Airport =

Airport in Oklahoma, United States

- IATA: none; ICAO: KJSV; FAA LID: JSV

Summary
- Airport type: Public
- Owner: City of Sallisaw
- Serves: Sallisaw, Oklahoma
- Elevation AMSL: 527 ft (161 m)
- Coordinates: 35°26′18″N 094°48′10″W

Map
- Location of airport in Oklahoma JSV (the United States)

Runways
Direction	Length		Surface
Direction	ft	m	Surface
17/35	4,006	1,221	Asphalt

Statistics (2011)
- Aircraft operations: 1,800
- Based aircraft: 17
- Source: Federal Aviation Administration

Sallisaw Municipal Airport (ICAO: KJSV, FAA LID: JSV) is a city-owned, public-use airport located one nautical mile (2 km) southwest of the central business district of Sallisaw, a city in Sequoyah County, Oklahoma, United States. It is included in the National Plan of Integrated Airport Systems for 2011–2015, which categorized it as a general aviation facility.

Although most U.S. airports use the same three-letter location identifier for the FAA and IATA, this airport is assigned JSV by the FAA, but has no designation from the IATA.

== Facilities and aircraft ==
Sallisaw Municipal Airport covers an area of 171 acres (69 ha) at an elevation of 527 feet (161 m) above mean sea level. It has one runway designated 17/35 with an asphalt surface measuring 4,006 by 75 feet (1,221 x 23 m).

For the 12-month period ending September 21, 2011, the airport had 1,800 aircraft operations, an average of 150 per month: 94% general aviation and 6% military. At that time there were 17 aircraft based at this airport: 82% single-engine and 18% multi-engine.

== See also ==
- List of airports in Oklahoma
