= Guthrie–Edmond Regional Airport =

Airport in Oklahoma, United States

- IATA: GOK; ICAO: KGOK; FAA LID: GOK

Summary
- Airport type: Public
- Owner: City of Guthrie
- Operator: Guthrie–Edmond Regional Airport Board
- Serves: Guthrie, Oklahoma
- Elevation AMSL: 1,069 ft (326 m)
- Coordinates: 35°51′05″N 097°24′58″W
- Website: GuthrieEdmondRegional; Airport.com

Map
- Location of airport in Oklahoma GOK (the United States)

Runways
Direction	Length		Surface
Direction	ft	m	Surface
16/34	5,001	1,524	Concrete

Statistics (2011)
- Aircraft operations: 15,020
- Based aircraft: 115
- Source: Federal Aviation Administration

Guthrie–Edmond Regional Airport (IATA: GOK, ICAO: KGOK, FAA LID: GOK) is a public use airport in Logan County, Oklahoma, United States. It is located two nautical miles (4 km) south of Guthrie and 7 miles (11 km) north of Edmond. The airport has been operated by both cities since 2005. It was formerly known as Guthrie Municipal Airport.

This airport is included in the National Plan of Integrated Airport Systems for 2017–2021, which categorized it as a general aviation facility.

== Facilities and aircraft ==
Guthrie–Edmond Regional Airport covers an area of 411 acres (166 ha) at an elevation of 1,069 feet (326 m) above mean sea level. It has one runway designated 16/34 with a concrete surface measuring 5,001 by 75 feet (1,524 x 23 m).

For the 12-month period ending September 28, 2011, the airport had 15,020 aircraft operations, an average of 41 per day: 99.9% general aviation and 0.1% military. At that time there were 115 aircraft based at this airport: 78% single-engine, 11% multi-engine, 6% jet, 4% helicopter, and 1% ultralight.

== See also ==
- List of airports in Oklahoma
