= Westport Airport (Oklahoma) =

Airport in Oklahoma, United States

- IATA: none; ICAO: none; FAA LID: 4F1

Summary
- Airport type: Public
- Owner: Town of Westport
- Serves: Westport, Oklahoma
- Elevation AMSL: 901 ft (275 m)
- Coordinates: 36°13′17″N 096°20′47″W

Map
- Location of airport in Oklahoma 4F1 (the United States)

Runways
Direction	Length		Surface
Direction	ft	m	Surface
3/21	2,900	884	Asphalt

Statistics (2006)
- Aircraft operations: 4,800
- Based aircraft: 18
- Source: Federal Aviation Administration

Westport Airport (FAA LID: 4F1) is a town-owned, public-use airport located two nautical miles (4 km) east of the central business district of Westport, Oklahoma, United States.

== Facilities and aircraft ==
Westport Airport covers an area of 13 acres (5 ha) at an elevation of 901 feet (275 m) above mean sea level. It has one runway designated 3/21 with an asphalt surface measuring 2,900 by 42 feet (884 x 13 m).

For the 12-month period ending April 18, 2006, the airport had 4,800 general aviation aircraft operations, an average of 13 per day. At that time there were 18 aircraft based at this airport: 12 single-engine, 4 helicopter, and 2 multi-engine.

== See also ==
- List of airports in Oklahoma
