= Sundance Airport =

- IATA: none; ICAO: KHSD; FAA LID: HSD

Summary
- Airport type: Public
- Owner: Hunter Group LLC
- Serves: Oklahoma City, Oklahoma
- Elevation AMSL: 1,193 ft / 364 m
- Coordinates: 35°36′07″N 097°42′22″W
- Website: Sundance Airport
- Interactive map of Sundance Airport

Runways
Direction	Length		Surface
Direction	ft	m	Surface
18/36	5,001	1,524	Concrete

Statistics (2016)
- Aircraft operations: 39,492
- Based aircraft: 209
- Source: Federal Aviation Administration

Sundance Airport (ICAO: KHSD, FAA LID: HSD) is a public use airport located at 13000 N. Sara Road in the city of Oklahoma City (although it has a Yukon mailing address) in Canadian County, Oklahoma, United States. The airport is 11 nautical miles (20 km) northwest of the central business district of Oklahoma City. It is privately owned by Hunter Group LLC.

== Facilities and aircraft ==
Sundance Airport covers an area of 340 acres (140 ha) at an elevation of 1,193 feet (364 m) above mean sea level. It has one runway designated 18/36 with a concrete surface measuring 5,001 by 100 feet (1,524 x 30 m). The airport offers self-service 100LL and full service 100LL and Jet A.

For the 12-month period ending November 21, 2016, the airport had 39,492 general aviation aircraft operations, an average of 108 per day. There are 209 aircraft based at this airport: 81% single-engine, 15% multi-engine and 4% jet.

== See also ==
- List of airports in Oklahoma
