= Claremore Regional Airport =

Airport in Oklahoma, United States

- IATA: none; ICAO: KGCM; FAA LID: GCM

Summary
- Airport type: Public
- Owner: City of Claremore
- Serves: Claremore, Oklahoma
- Elevation AMSL: 733 ft (223 m)
- Coordinates: 36°17′34″N 095°28′47″W
- Website: ClaremoreAirport.com

Map
- Location of airport in Oklahoma GCM (the United States)

Runways
Direction	Length		Surface
Direction	ft	m	Surface
17/35	5,200	1,585	Asphalt

Statistics (2011)
- Aircraft operations: 12,000
- Based aircraft: 38
- Source: Federal Aviation Administration

Claremore Regional Airport (ICAO: KGCM, FAA LID: GCM) is a city-owned, public-use airport located seven nautical miles (8 mi, 13 km) east of the central business district of Claremore, a city in Rogers County, Oklahoma, United States. It is included in the National Plan of Integrated Airport Systems for 2011–2015, which categorized it as a general aviation facility.

Although most U.S. airports use the same three-letter location identifier for the FAA and IATA, this airport is assigned GCM by the FAA, but has no designation from the IATA (which assigned GCM to Owen Roberts International Airport in Grand Cayman).

== Facilities and aircraft ==
Claremore Regional Airport covers an area of 566 acres (213 ha) at an elevation of 733 feet (223 m) above mean sea level. It has one runway designated 18/36 with an asphalt surface measuring 5,200 by 75 feet (1,585 x 23 m). 100LL and Jet A is available 24hr /day via credit card.

For the 12-month period ending March 25, 2011, the airport had 12,000 general aviation aircraft operations, an average of 32 per day. As of July 7, 2023 there are 85 aircraft based at this airport:Single Engine 76 + Multi Engine 4 + Jet 1 + Helicopter 4 = 85.

== See also ==
- List of airports in Oklahoma
