= Tulsa Riverside Airport =

Airport in Tulsa, Oklahoma, U.S.

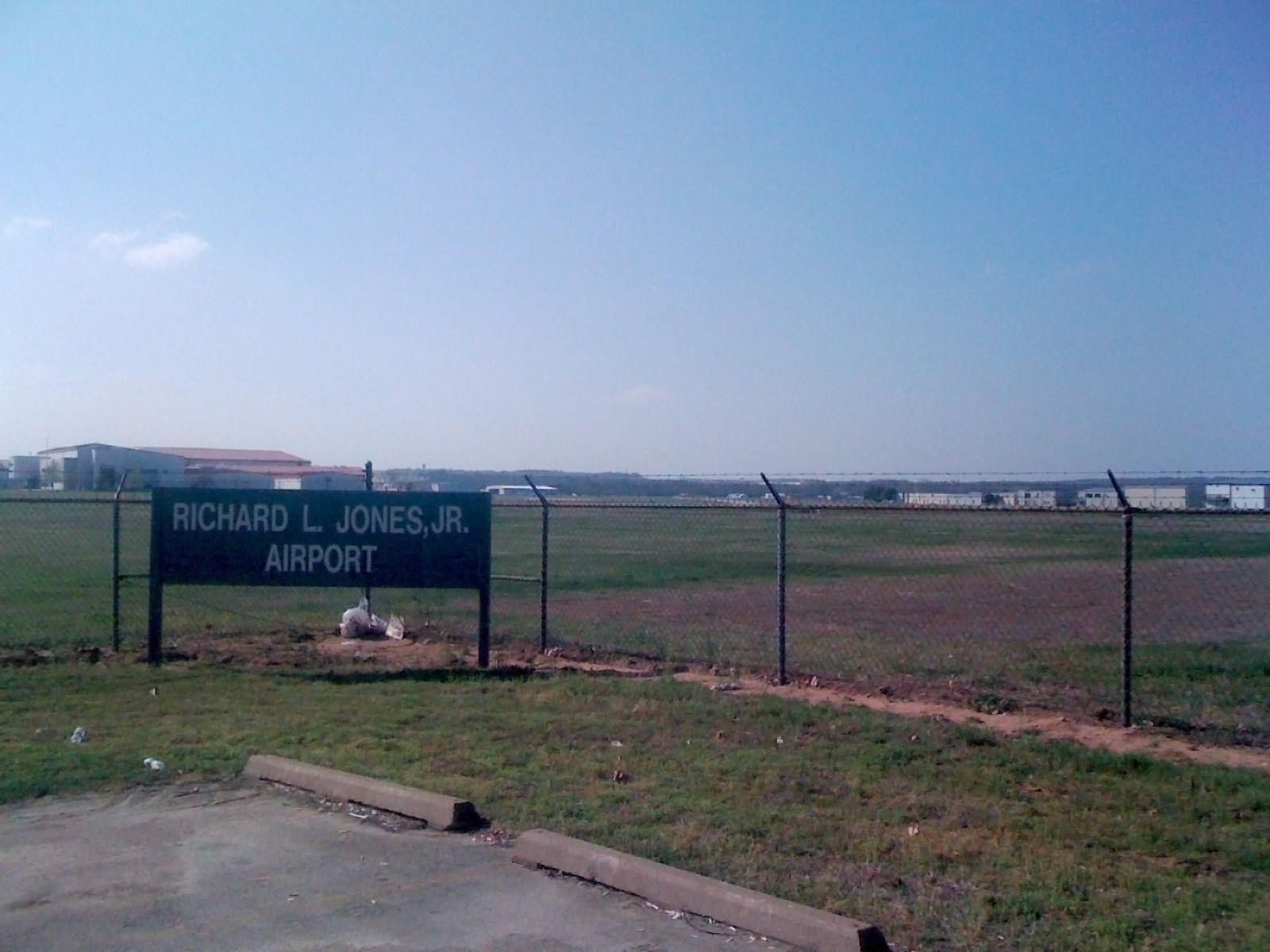
- IATA: RVS; ICAO: KRVS; FAA LID: RVS

Summary
- Airport type: Public
- Owner: City of Tulsa
- Serves: Tulsa, Oklahoma
- Elevation AMSL: 638 ft (194 m)
- Coordinates: 36°02′23″N 095°59′05″W
- Website: TulsaAirports.com/...

Map
- Location of airport in Oklahoma / United States RVS (the United States)

Runways
Direction	Length		Surface
Direction	ft	m	Surface
1L/19R	5,102	1,555	Asphalt
1R/19L	4,208	1,283	Asphalt
13/31	2,641	805	Asphalt

Statistics (2023)
- Aircraft operations: 223,309
- Based aircraft: 274

Tulsa Riverside Airport (IATA: RVS, ICAO: KRVS, FAA LID: RVS) is a city-owned, public-use airport located five nautical miles (6 mi, 9 km) south of the central business district of Tulsa, a city in Tulsa County, Oklahoma, United States. The facility was known as Richard Lloyd Jones Jr. Airport for several decades but was formally renamed in January 2022 to reduce confusion with another airport in Oklahoma. In the National Plan of Integrated Airport Systems for 2021–2025, Riverside is classed as a national-level nonprimary airport, and a reliever airport for Tulsa International. National nonprimary airports are those that serve primarily general aviation (GA) users in metropolitan areas near major business centers, and have high traffic including many jets and multi-engine aircraft.

The airport is the busiest in Oklahoma in terms of takeoffs and landings: more than 223,300 in 2023. The airport averaged 534 operations per day for the 12-month period ending October 10, 2018, making it considerably busier than Tulsa International (which has an average 254 operations per day) or Oklahoma City’s Will Rogers World Airport (which has an average 302 operations per day).

== History ==
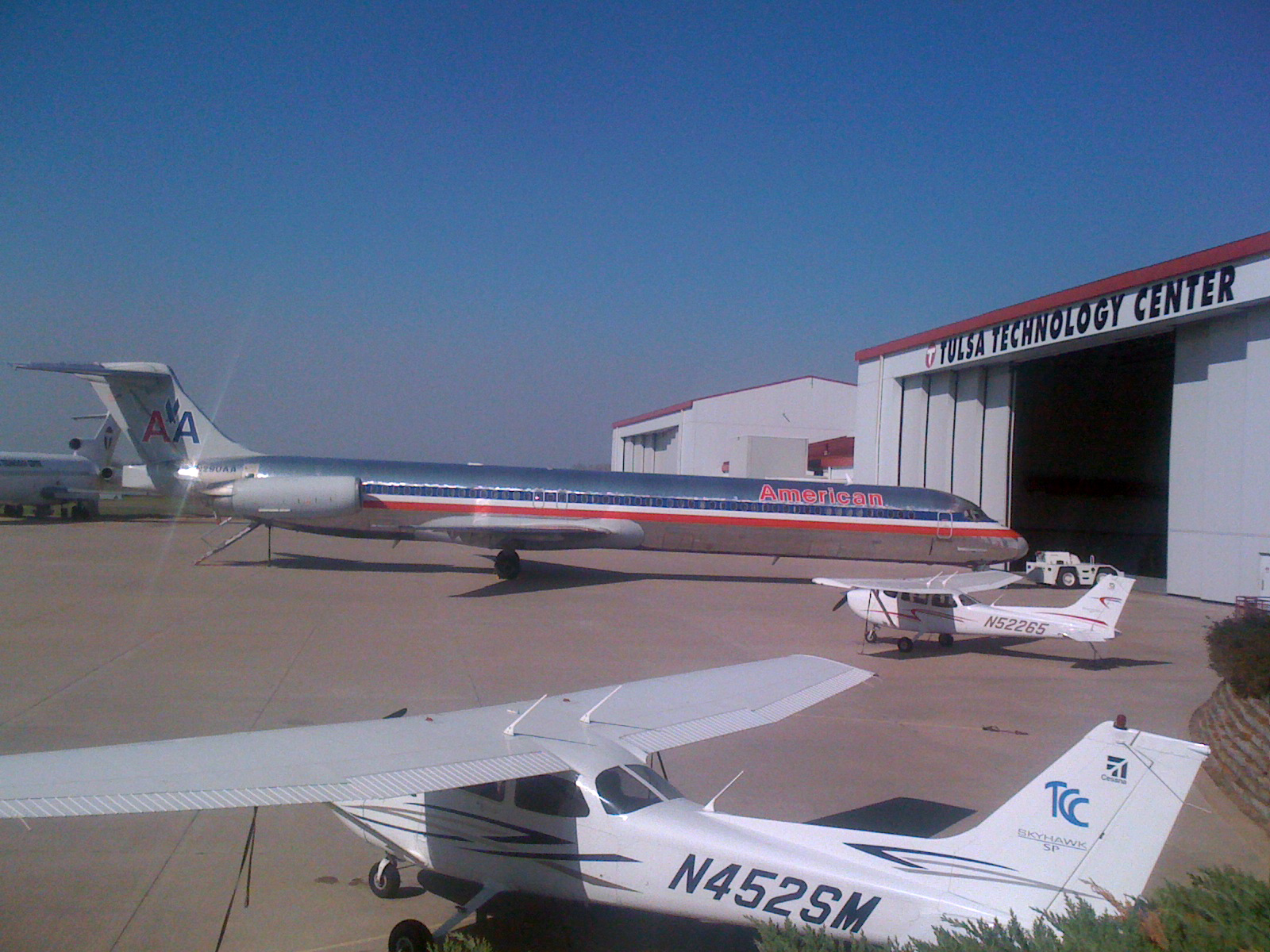
MD-80 landed at Jones Riverside airport (April 2011)

In the 1950s, the city of Tulsa decided to build a second airport to alleviate congestion around Tulsa International Airport. A consulting group hired by the city performed a site selection study. In February, 1955, the group recommended a site on the west side of the Arkansas River, just north of Jenks, Oklahoma. Construction began in 1957.

The facility, originally called Riverside Airport, opened on July 3, 1958. At that time, the airport had one 4,000-foot (1,200 m) long runway, an aircraft ramp, and one concrete building. By 1965, there were enough operations to justify building an air traffic control tower.

In 1967, the Tulsa Airports Improvement Trust (TAIT) was established as a public trust to operate, construct and maintain airport facilities on behalf of the city of Tulsa. TAIT has no authority to levy taxes and depends on airport revenues to repay any airport-related debts. TAIT is independent of the city, but all board members are appointed by the Mayor of Tulsa and confirmed by the City Council. In October 1978, TAIT leased all city aviation facilities other than police and fire heliports to the city of Tulsa acting through the Tulsa Airport Authority (TAA), which agreed to disburse all airport-related income to TAIT. In July 1989, a lease amendment gave daily airport operation and maintenance responsibility to the TAA.

The number of take-offs and landings exceeded 300,000 in 1978. Also in 1978, the airport was renamed Richard Lloyd Jones Jr. Airport to honor its namesake's service on the TAIT Board of Trustees. In 1989, the airport installed an instrument landing system (ILS).

Throughout the past fifty years, the airport has grown to become a hub of business and economic activity for the Tulsa region. It now includes three runways, over two hundred commercial and private hangars, and over 500 based aircraft. In 2008, RVS was the fifth busiest general aviation airport in the country. Much of the airport's activity comes directly from its seven flight schools, including Tulsa Community College Professional Pilot School and Spartan College of Aeronautics and Technology. On 1 April 2011 an MD-80 donated by American Airlines was flown to the airport to replace the aging Boeing 727 then used for training Tulsa Technology Center students.

On November 9, 2021, the TAIT Board of Trustees announced that the facility would be renamed Tulsa Riverside Airport, effective January 1, 2022, with its code (RVS) remaining the same. This was done to clear up confusion with Jones Memorial Airport in Bristow.

== Facilities and aircraft ==
Tulsa Riverside Airport covers an area of 664 acres (269 ha) at an elevation of 638 feet (194 m) above mean sea level. It has three runways with asphalt surfaces: 1L/19R is 5,102 by 100 feet (1,555 x 30 m); 1R/19L is 4,208 by 100 feet (1,283 x 30 m); 13/31 is 2,641 by 50 feet (805 x 15 m). 120 acres (0.49 km^{2}) are leased to the Tulsa County Board of Commissioners for the operation of South Lakes Golf Course.

For the 12-month period ending October 10, 2018, the airport’s traffic was 60% local general aviation, 37% transient general aviation, 1% air taxi, and less than 1% each of military and commercial. At that time there were 313 aircraft based at this airport, with 257 single-engine, 31 multi-engine, 14 jets, 7 helicopters and 4 gliders.

== Airport observation area ==
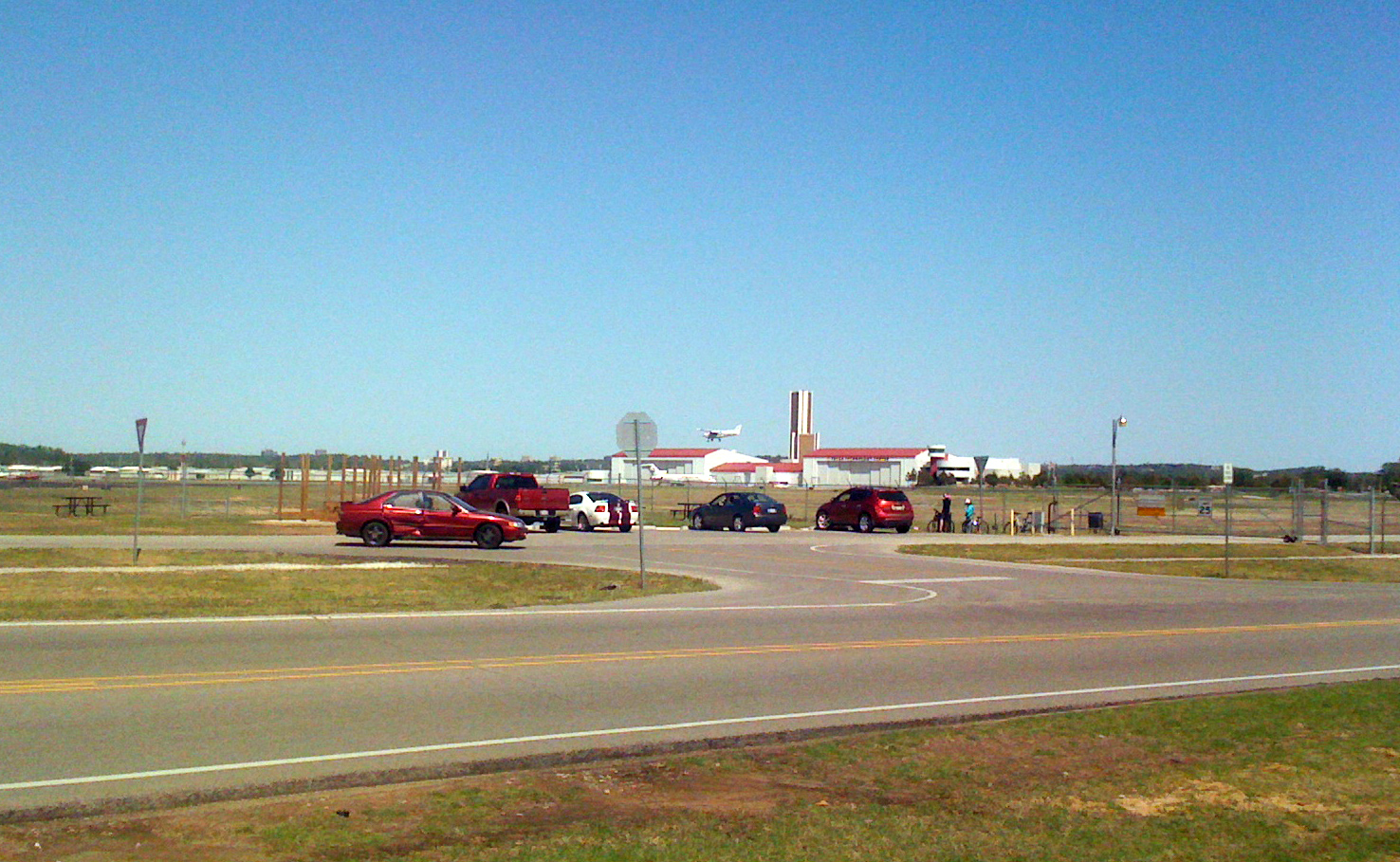
The airport observation area from across the street

Airport Observation Area
- Interactive map of Airport Observation Area
- Type: Observation Area
- Location: Tulsa Riverside Airport
- Coordinates: 36°01′55″N 95°59′26″W
- Area: 0.6 acres (2,400 m^{2})
- Created: 2009
- Operator: Tulsa Airport Authority
- Open: All year
- Website: http://tulsaairports.com/index.cfm?id=83&tertFlag=6

In an effort to discourage drivers from parking on 91st Street adjacent to the airport to watch aircraft, the TAA built an observation area southwest of the airport, funded by charity golf tournaments held in 2009 and 2010, sales of brick pavers on the site, and sales of desk lamps made from salvaged airport taxiway lights that were replaced by LED lights. Parking spaces, an elevated viewing platform, enlarged airport diagram, and six picnic tables were completed and installed. When complete, the observation area will have a gazebo, security guard shack, and restroom. All work on the observation area was done by TAA employees except for the enlarged airport diagram which was completed as part of an Eagle Scout Service Project.

== See also ==
- List of airports in Oklahoma

== Sources ==
- Brockway, David Arthur (2007). The Impact of a General Aviation Airport on Surrounding Land Use Patterns: Richard Lloyd Jones Jr. Airport.
