= Pacific Air Holdings L.L.C. =

American aircraft leasing company

- Founded: 2002
- Headquarters: Shawnee, Oklahoma
- Key people: R.Franklin Ford (CEO); Darrin Lofton (President)
- Website: pacificairholdings.com

Pacific Air Holdings is an American aircraft leasing company based in Shawnee, Oklahoma, United States. The company moved from Mesa Arizona in 2015 and now operates from a 26,000 sq. ft hangar which they built in 2017 at the Shawnee Regional Airport. Pacific Air Holdings is owned by Darrin Lofton. Besides leasing Cessna aircraft, Pacific Air Holdings also sells aircraft.

Pacific Air Holdings owns aircraft in the United States, the Middle East, the Caribbean, the West Indies, and the Asian Pacific.
