= Kingfisher Airport =

Airport in Oklahoma, United States

- IATA: none; ICAO: none; FAA LID: F92

Summary
- Airport type: Public
- Location: Kingfisher, Oklahoma
- Elevation AMSL: 1,072 ft / 327 m
- Coordinates: 35°52′37″N 97°57′11″W

Map
- Location in Oklahoma F92 (the United States)

Runways
Direction	Length		Surface
Direction	ft	m	Surface
18/36	2,800	853	Concrete

Kingfisher Airport (FAA LID: F92) is a public use airport located 1 mile northwest of Kingfisher, Oklahoma, in Kingfisher County. The airport is publicly owned by the city of Kingfisher.

== Overview ==
Kingfisher Airport has one runway, marked 18/36. The runway is 2,800 feet long and 60 feet wide with a concrete surface. 100LL self-service is available on site. For the 12 months ending 9 February 2018, 4,000 general-aviation and 10 military operations were recorded.

== See also ==
- List of airports in Oklahoma
