= Hooker Municipal Airport =

- IATA: none; ICAO: none; FAA LID: O45

Summary
- Airport type: Public
- Owner: City of Hooker
- Serves: Hooker, Oklahoma
- Elevation AMSL: 2,998 ft (914 m)
- Coordinates: 36°51′25.5″N 101°13′37.53″W
- Interactive map of Hooker Municipal Airport

Runways
Direction	Length		Surface
Direction	ft	m	Surface
17/35	3,312	1,009	Asphalt

Statistics (2010)
- Aircraft operations: 1,000
- Based aircraft: 10
- Source: Federal Aviation Administration

Hooker Municipal Airport (IATA: O45) is a city-owned public-use airport located zero miles west of the central business district of Hooker, a city in Texas County, Oklahoma, United States.

Hooker Municipal Airport covers an area of 60 acres which contains one runway designated 17/35 with a 3,312 x 60 ft (1,009 x 18 m) asphalt surface. For the 12-month period ending September 23, 2010, the airport had 1,000 aircraft operations, an average of 83 per month: 100% general aviation. At that time there were 10 aircraft based at this airport: 10 single-engine.

== See also ==
- List of airports in Oklahoma
