= Sam Riggs Airpark =

- IATA: none; ICAO: none; FAA LID: K11

Summary
- Airport type: Public
- Owner: Crat Properties
- Serves: Claremore, Oklahoma
- Elevation AMSL: 580 ft / 177 m
- Coordinates: 36°13′05″N 095°39′07″W
- Interactive map of Sam Riggs Airpark

Runways
Direction	Length		Surface
Direction	ft	m	Surface
4/22 (CLOSED)	2,760	841	Turf
18/36	1,550	472	Turf
- Source: Federal Aviation Administration

Sam Riggs Airpark (FAA LID: K11) is a privately owned public-use airport located seven nautical miles (13 km) south of the central business district of Claremore, in Rogers County, Oklahoma, United States.

== Facilities ==
Sam Riggs Airpark covers an area of 160 acres (65 ha) at an elevation of 580 feet (177 m) above mean sea level. It has two runways with turf surfaces: 4/22 is 2,760 by 35 feet (841 x 11 m) and 18/36 is 1,550 by 110 feet (472 x 34 m). Runway 04/22 is closed indefinitely.

== See also ==
- List of airports in Oklahoma
