= Teramiranda Airport =

Airport in Oklahoma, United States of America

- IATA: none; ICAO: none; FAA LID: 79F

Summary
- Airport type: Public
- Owner: Gene Gregg
- Serves: Afton, Oklahoma
- Location: Monkey Island, Oklahoma
- Elevation AMSL: 793 ft / 242 m
- Coordinates: 36°36′30″N 094°52′21″W

Map
- Location of airport in Oklahoma

Runways
Direction	Length		Surface
Direction	ft	m	Surface
18/36	2,580	786	Turf

Statistics (2007)
- Aircraft operations: 100
- Source: Federal Aviation Administration

Teramiranda Airport (FAA LID: 79F) was a privately owned, public use airport in Delaware County, Oklahoma, United States. It is located on Monkey Island, a peninsula on the northern shore of Grand Lake o' the Cherokees. The airport is seven nautical miles (13 km) southeast of the central business district of Afton, a city in Ottawa County, Oklahoma. As of October 19, 2009, the airport was permanently closed.

== Facilities and aircraft ==
Teramiranda Airport covers an area of 40 acres (16 ha) at an elevation of 793 feet (242 m) above mean sea level. It has one runway designated 18/36 with turf surface measuring 2,580 by 35 feet (786 x 11 m). For the 12-month period ending September 11, 2007, the airport had 100 general aviation aircraft operations, an average of 8 per month.

== See also ==
- Grand Lake Regional Airport
