= Mooreland Municipal Airport =

Airport in Oklahoma, United States

- IATA: none; ICAO: KMDF; FAA LID: MDF

Summary
- Airport type: Public
- Owner: City of Mooreland
- Serves: Mooreland, Oklahoma
- Elevation AMSL: 1,970 ft (600 m)
- Coordinates: 36°29′05″N 099°11′39″W

Map
- Location of airport in Oklahoma MDF (the United States)

Runways
Direction	Length		Surface
Direction	ft	m	Surface
17/35	3,500	1,067	Asphalt

Statistics (2008)
- Aircraft operations: 250
- Based aircraft: 10
- Source: Federal Aviation Administration

Mooreland Municipal Airport (ICAO: KMDF, FAA LID: MDF) is a city-owned, public-use airport located three nautical miles (6 km) north of the central business district of Mooreland, a city in Woodward County, Oklahoma, United States. It is included in the National Plan of Integrated Airport Systems for 2011–2015, which categorized it as a general aviation facility.

Although most U.S. airports use the same three-letter location identifier for the FAA and IATA, this airport is assigned MDF by the FAA, but has no designation from the IATA (which assigned MDF to Taylor County Airport in Medford, Wisconsin).

== Facilities and aircraft ==
Mooreland Municipal Airport covers an area of 80 acres (32 ha) at an elevation of 1,970 feet (600 m) above mean sea level. It has one runway designated 17/35 with an asphalt surface measuring 3,500 by 60 feet (1,067 x 18 m).

For the 12-month period ending November 19, 2008, the airport had 250 general aviation aircraft operations, an average of 20 per month. At that time there were 10 aircraft based at this airport, all single-engine.

== See also ==
- List of airports in Oklahoma
