= Shawnee Regional Airport =

Airport in Oklahoma, United States

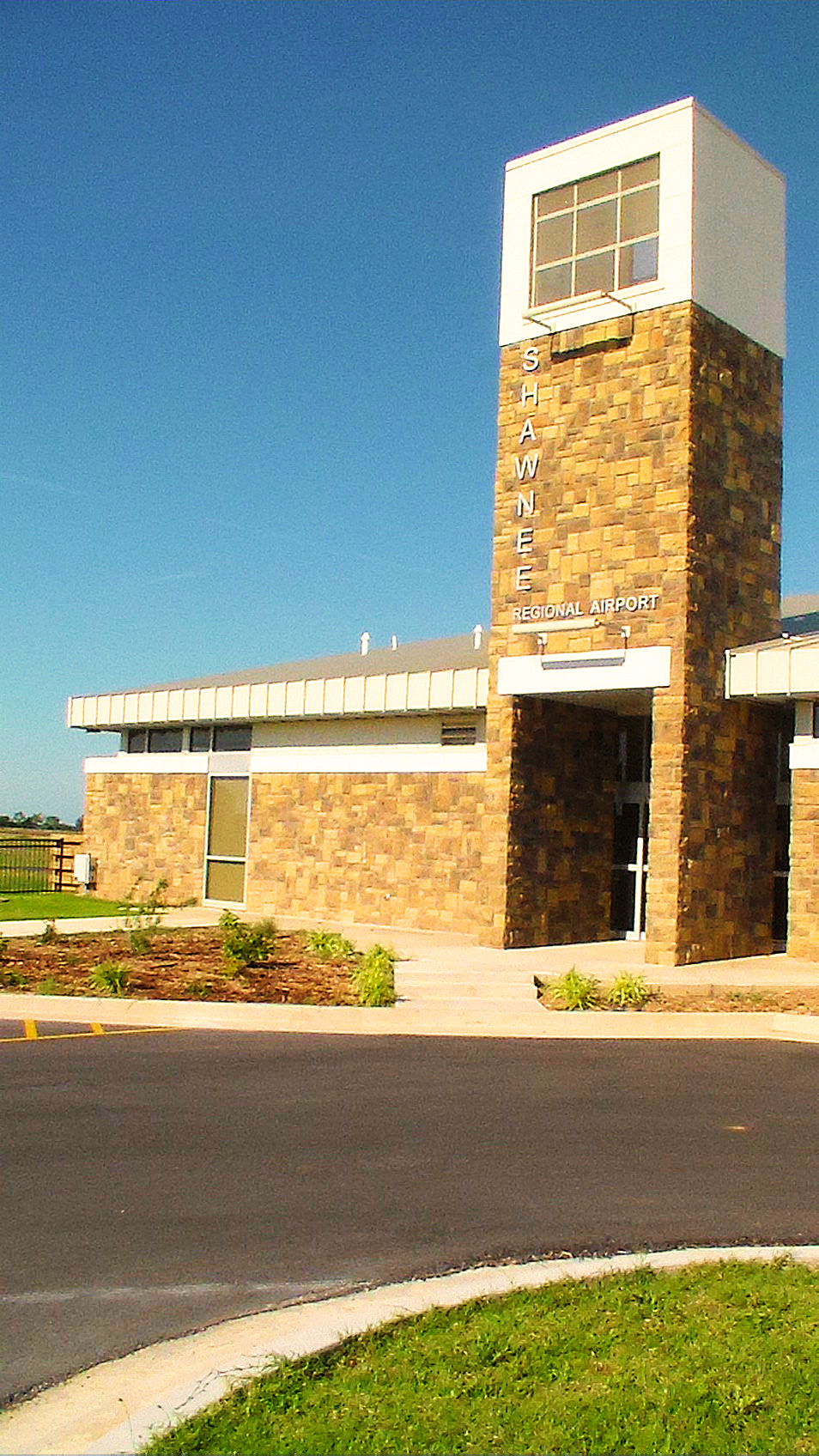
- Main terminal
- IATA: SNL; ICAO: KSNL; FAA LID: SNL

Summary
- Airport type: Public
- Owner: City of Shawnee
- Serves: Shawnee, Oklahoma
- Elevation AMSL: 1,073 ft (327 m)
- Coordinates: 35°21′26″N 096°56′34″W
- Website: ShawneeAirport.com

Map
- Location within Oklahoma Location within the United States

Runways
Direction	Length		Surface
Direction	ft	m	Surface
17/35	5,997	1,828	Asphalt

Statistics (2008)
- Aircraft operations: 5,050
- Based aircraft: 38
- Source: Federal Aviation Administration

Shawnee Regional Airport (IATA: SNL, ICAO: KSNL, FAA LID: SNL) is two miles northwest of Shawnee, in Pottawatomie County, Oklahoma. It was formerly Shawnee Municipal Airport.

The National Plan of Integrated Airport Systems for 2011–2015 called it a general aviation facility.

In 2011 the airport opened a new terminal building. The 4,000 ft^{2} (370 m^{2}) building has a conference room and observation deck. The previous terminal was built in 1953.

Central Airlines scheduled flights to Shawnee from 1950 to 1954.

== Facilities ==
The airport covers 520 acres (210 ha) at an elevation of 1,073 feet (327 m). Its single runway, 17/35, is 5,997 by 100 feet (1,828 x 30 m) asphalt.

In the year ending August 29, 2008 the airport had 5,050 aircraft operations, average 13 per day: 99% general aviation and 1% military. 38 aircraft were then based at the airport: 84.2% single-engine, 10.5% multi-engine, 2.6% jet, and 2.6% helicopter.

The airport is home to the maintenance facility KSNL Aero and the aircraft leasing service Pacific Air Holdings.

== See also ==
- List of airports in Oklahoma
