= McCaslin Airport =

- IATA: none; ICAO: none; FAA LID: O44

Summary
- Airport type: Public use
- Owner: Gladys McCaslin
- Serves: Lexington, Oklahoma
- Elevation AMSL: 1,135 ft / 346 m
- Coordinates: 35°05′32″N 097°20′11″W

Map
- Location of airport in Oklahoma O44 (the United States)

Runways
Direction	Length		Surface
Direction	ft	m	Surface
17/35	2,135	651	Turf

Statistics (2010)
- Aircraft operations: 600
- Based aircraft: 4
- Source: Federal Aviation Administration

McCaslin Airport (FAA LID: O44) is a public use airport located four nautical miles (5 mi, 7 km) north of the central business district of Lexington, a city in Cleveland County, Oklahoma, United States.

== Facilities and aircraft ==
McCaslin Airport covers an area of 140 acres (57 ha) at an elevation of 1,135 feet (346 m) above mean sea level. It has one runway designated 17/35 with a turf surface measuring 2,135 by 80 feet (651 x 24 m).

For the 12-month period ending January 14, 2010, the airport had 600 general aviation aircraft operations, an average of 50 per month. At that time there were four single-engine aircraft based at this airport.

== See also ==
- List of airports in Oklahoma
