= Ketchum, Oklahoma =

Town in Oklahoma, US

- Town
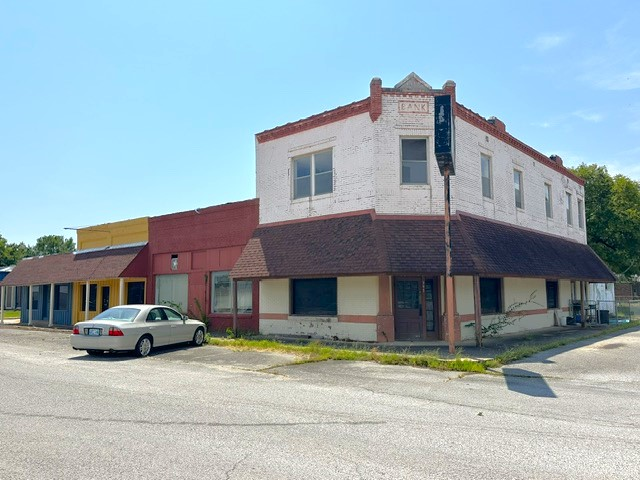
- On Main Street in Ketchum, 8-2026

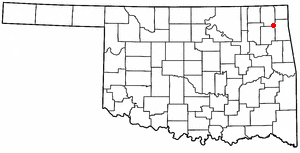
- Location in Oklahoma
- Coordinates: 36°31′32″N 95°1′33″W
- Country: United States
- State: Oklahoma
- Counties: Craig, Mayes

Area
  - Total: 2.07 sq mi (5.37 km^{2})
  - Land: 2.07 sq mi (5.36 km^{2})
  - Water: 0.0039 sq mi (0.01 km^{2})
- Elevation: 787 ft (240 m)

Population (2020)
  - Total: 471
  - Density: 227/sq mi (87.8/km^{2})
- Time zone: UTC-6 (Central (CST))
  - Summer (DST): UTC-5 (CDT)
- ZIP Code: 74349
- FIPS code: 40-39550
- GNIS feature ID: 2412829
- Website: www.ketchumok.gov

Ketchum is a town in Craig and Mayes counties, Oklahoma, United States. The population was 471 at the 2020 census, up from 442 in 2010.

== History ==
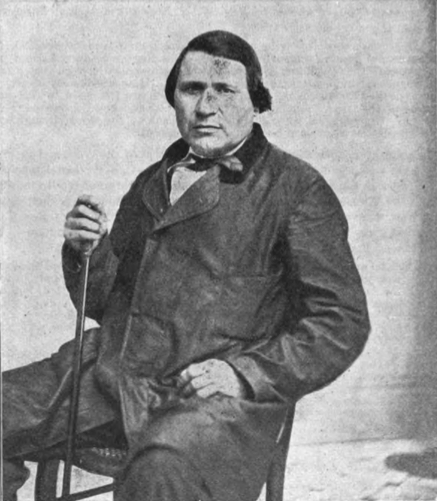
Portrait of James Ketchum, of the Delaware tribe

The town was named for James Ketchum, a Delaware Indian and Methodist minister who had relocated to Indian Territory in 1867 from Wyandotte County, Kansas. The Post Office Department established the post office on September 15, 1899, at the original townsite. Ketchum was originally located in northeastern Mayes County, on the bank of the Grand River (Neosho River). It was relocated to southeastern Craig County around 1912 when the Missouri, Oklahoma and Gulf Railroad — which became the Kansas, Oklahoma and Gulf Railway (KO&G) in 1919 — was being constructed from southeastern Kansas south through the region. New Ketchum was platted in late 1912. The original townsite sat in an area that was later filled in by the creation of Grand Lake o' the Cherokees.

The economy of Ketchum was based on agriculture until Pensacola Dam was built between December 30, 1938, and March 21, 1940, creating Grand Lake. Since then, the local economy has largely been dominated by tourism and other businesses related to the lake.

The South Grand Lake Regional Airport (formerly known as the Craig County South Grand Lake Airport) completed a $4.58 million runway project in April 2021, which involved widening the runway from 60 ft to 75 ft, laying a new asphalt runway surface, and installing visual guidance systems and LED runway edge lights. The airport is a Title 60 Public Trust, supported by volunteer trustees, the Federal Aviation Administration, and the Oklahoma Aeronautics Commission. The land on which the airport is built was officially designated "Brent Howard Field" in June 2024, named after local community leader S. Brent Howard, who was instrumental in creating the airport's managing authority and establishing it as a Title 60 Public Trust. In September 2025, the Oklahoma Department of Aerospace and Aeronautics and the airport held a groundbreaking ceremony for a new 3,800-square-foot terminal building, a 12,000-square-foot commercial hangar, and a partial parallel taxiway, with total project costs of approximately $12.3 million.

== Geography ==
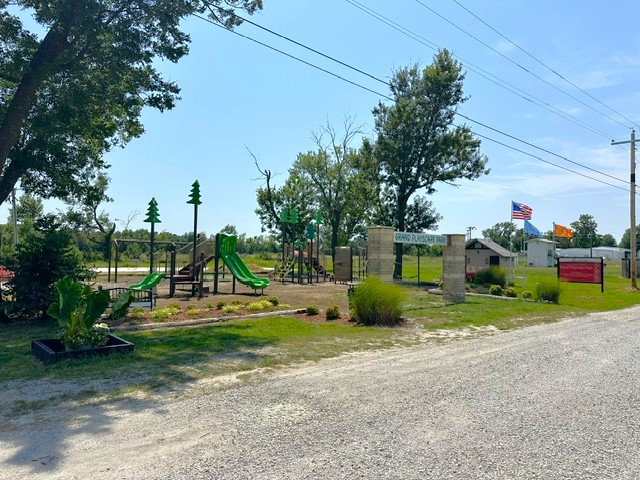
Grand Playscape Park at Ketchum in August of 2026

Ketchum is located in the southeast corner of Craig County. A portion of the town extends south into Mayes County and borders a small arm of Grand Lake.

Oklahoma State Highway 85 passes through Ketchum, leading 2 miles (3 km) west to Highway 82. Via Highways 85, 82, and U.S. 60, it is 14 miles (23 km) northwest to Vinita, the Craig County seat. Highway 85 leads northeast parallel to Grand Lake, 12 miles (19 km) to Bernice.

According to the U.S. Census Bureau, the town of Ketchum has a total area of 2.07 square miles (5.4 km^{2}), of which 0.002 square miles (0.005 km^{2}), or 0.1%, are water.

== Demographics ==
Historical population
Census	Pop.	Note	%±
1940	611		—
1950	254		−58.4%
1960	255		0.4%
1970	238		−6.7%
1980	326		37.0%
1990	263		−19.3%
2000	286		8.7%
2010	442		54.5%
2020	471		6.6%
U.S. Decennial Census

=== 2020 census ===
As of the 2020 census, Ketchum had a population of 471. The median age was 45.2 years. 21.2% of residents were under the age of 18 and 22.7% of residents were 65 years of age or older. For every 100 females there were 92.2 males, and for every 100 females age 18 and over there were 99.5 males age 18 and over.

0.0% of residents lived in urban areas, while 100.0% lived in rural areas.

There were 200 households in Ketchum, of which 35.0% had children under the age of 18 living in them. Of all households, 38.5% were married-couple households, 23.0% were households with a male householder and no spouse or partner present, and 29.5% were households with a female householder and no spouse or partner present. About 27.0% of all households were made up of individuals and 12.5% had someone living alone who was 65 years of age or older. There were 277 housing units, of which 27.8% were vacant. The homeowner vacancy rate was 2.1% and the rental vacancy rate was 8.8%.

Racial composition as of the 2020 census
Race	Number	Percent
White	351	74.5%
Black or African American	3	0.6%
American Indian and Alaska Native	66	14.0%
Asian	1	0.2%
Native Hawaiian and Other Pacific Islander	0	0.0%
Some other race	0	0.0%
Two or more races	50	10.6%
Hispanic or Latino (of any race)	12	2.5%

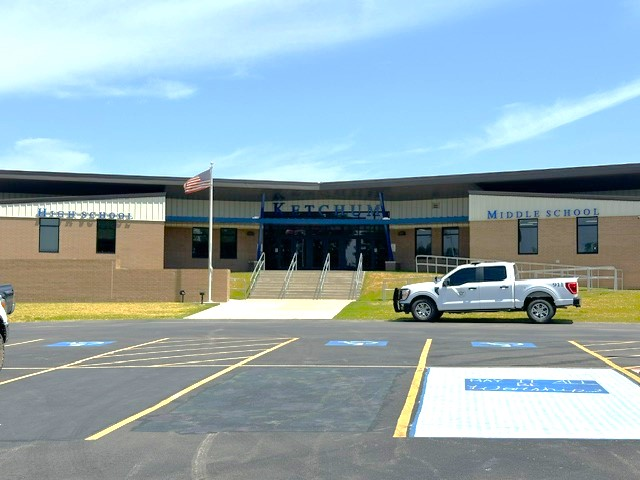
Ketchum High and Middle Schools in August of 2026

== Education ==
It is in the Ketchum Public Schools school district.
