= Beaver Municipal Airport (Oklahoma) =

- IATA: none; ICAO: none; FAA LID: K44

Summary
- Airport type: Public
- Owner: City of Beaver
- Serves: Beaver, Oklahoma
- Elevation AMSL: 2,491 ft (759 m)
- Coordinates: 36°47′56″N 100°31′48″W
- Interactive map of Beaver Municipal Airport

Runways
Direction	Length		Surface
Direction	ft	m	Surface
17/35	4,050	1,234	Asphalt/gravel
4/22	2,000	610	Turf

Statistics (2023)
- Aircraft operations (year ending 7/10/2023): 1,200
- Based aircraft: 3
- Source: Federal Aviation Administration

Beaver Municipal Airport (FAA LID: K44) is a city-owned, public-use airport located one mile (2 km) southwest of the central business district of Beaver, a city in Beaver County, Oklahoma, United States.

== Facilities and aircraft ==
Beaver Municipal Airport covers an area of 252 acres (102 ha) and contains two runways. Runway 17/35 has an asphalt/gravel surface measuring 4,050 by 60 feet (1,234 x 18 m). Runway 4/22 has a turf surface measuring 2,000 by 130 feet (610 by 40 m).

For the 12-month period ending July 10, 2023, the airport had 1,200 general aviation aircraft operations, an average of 23 per week. At that time, there were three aircraft based at this airport: three single-engine.

== See also ==
- List of airports in Oklahoma
