= Chandler Regional Airport =

Airport in Oklahoma, United States

- IATA: none; ICAO: KCQB; FAA LID: CQB

Summary
- Airport type: Public
- Owner: City of Chandler
- Serves: Chandler, Oklahoma
- Elevation AMSL: 984 ft (300 m)
- Coordinates: 35°43′26″N 096°49′13″W
- Website: ChandlerOK.com/...

Map
- Location of airport in Oklahoma / United States CQB (the United States)

Runways
Direction	Length		Surface
Direction	ft	m	Surface
17/35	4,000	1,219	Asphalt

Statistics (2011)
- Aircraft operations: 3,400
- Based aircraft: 5
- Source: Federal Aviation Administration

Chandler Regional Airport (ICAO: KCQB, FAA LID: CQB) is a city-owned, public-use airport located three nautical miles (6 km) northeast of the central business district of Chandler, a city in Lincoln County, Oklahoma, United States. It is included in the National Plan of Integrated Airport Systems for 2011–2015, which categorized it as a general aviation facility.

Although most U.S. airports use the same three-letter location identifier for the FAA and IATA, this airport is assigned CQB by the FAA, but has no designation from the IATA.

== Facilities and aircraft ==
Chandler Regional Airport covers an area of 80 acres (32 ha) at an elevation of 984 feet (300 m) above mean sea level. It has one runway designated 17/35 with an asphalt surface measuring 4,000 by 60 feet (1,219 x 18 m).

For the 12-month period ending March 23, 2011, the airport had 3,400 general aviation aircraft operations, an average of 283 per month. At that time there were 5 aircraft based at this airport: 40% single-engine, 40% jet, and 20% multi-engine.

== See also ==
- List of airports in Oklahoma
