= Altus/Quartz Mountain Regional Airport =

- IATA: AXS; ICAO: KAXS; FAA LID: AXS

Summary
- Airport type: Public
- Owner: City of Altus
- Serves: Altus, Oklahoma
- Elevation AMSL: 1,433 ft (437 m)
- Coordinates: 34°41′55.7″N 099°20′18.5″W
- Website: www.AltusAirport.com

Map
- Location of airport in Oklahoma AXS (the United States)

Runways
Direction	Length		Surface
Direction	ft	m	Surface
17/35	5,501	1,677	Concrete

Statistics (2020)
- Aircraft operations (year ending 11/6/2020): 8,472
- Based aircraft: 30
- Source: Federal Aviation Administration

Altus/Quartz Mountain Regional Airport (IATA: AXS, ICAO: KAXS, FAA LID: AXS) is a city-owned, public-use airport located three nautical miles (6 km) north of the central business district of Altus, a city in Jackson County, Oklahoma, United States. It is included in the National Plan of Integrated Airport Systems for 2011–2015, which categorized it as a general aviation facility.

== Facilities and aircraft ==
Altus/Quartz Mountain Regional Airport covers an area of 434 acres (176 ha) at an elevation of 1,433 feet (437 m) above mean sea level. It has one runway designated 17/35 with a concrete surface measuring 5,501 by 75 feet (1,677 x 23 m).

For the 12-month period ending November 6, 2020, the airport had 8,472 general aviation aircraft operations, an average of 23 per day. At that time there were 30 aircraft based at this airport: 25 single-engine, one multi-engine, one jet, and three helicopter.

== See also ==
- List of airports in Oklahoma
