= Monkey Island, Oklahoma =

Monkey Island
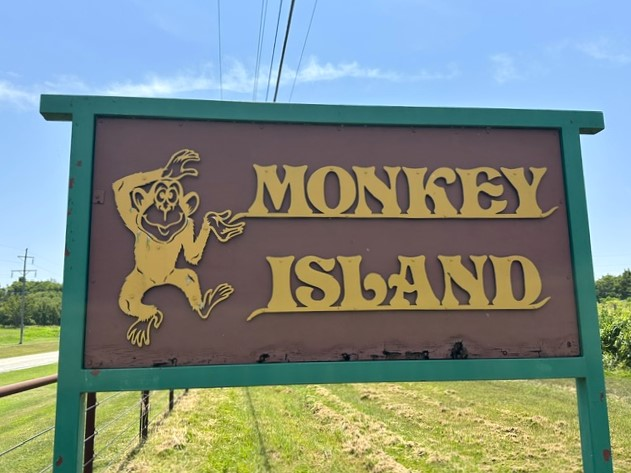
- Sign at threshold of Monkey Island, 8-2026

- Location on a map of Oklahoma
- Coordinates: 36.59°N 94.87°W
- Country: United States
- State: Oklahoma
- County: Delaware County

Monkey Island is a peninsula on the northern shore of Grand Lake o' the Cherokees, located 8 miles (13 km) southwest of Grove, Oklahoma. It is 6 miles (9.7 km) long from north to south and State Highway 125 runs through the peninsula to its southern end.

It is a popular tourism and recreation destination in the area, with resort hotels, a golf course, sporting facilities, and a marina. Residents and tourists of the peninsula are supported by the towns of Bernice and Copeland. Monkey Island is also home to the Grand Lake Regional Airport.

== History ==
Monkey Island formed in 1940 as a result of the completion of the Pensacola Dam and the formation of Grand Lake o' the Cherokees.

The peninsula is allegedly named after a quote from a 1938 Tulsa World interview in which Gove Bunch, a local Bernice, Oklahoma resident, gestured to the land that would be the peninsula and said “Over there will be Monkey Island, where all the monkeys are kept”, alluding to changing landscape amongst rising flood waters.

In 1964, the Shangri La Hotel opened on the south end of the peninsula. The resort hosted the 1977 Midwestern Governors’ Conference and the 1982 National Governors’ Conference. The resort has changed ownership multiple times, but remains a community stronghold.

== Gallery ==
Around the peninsula
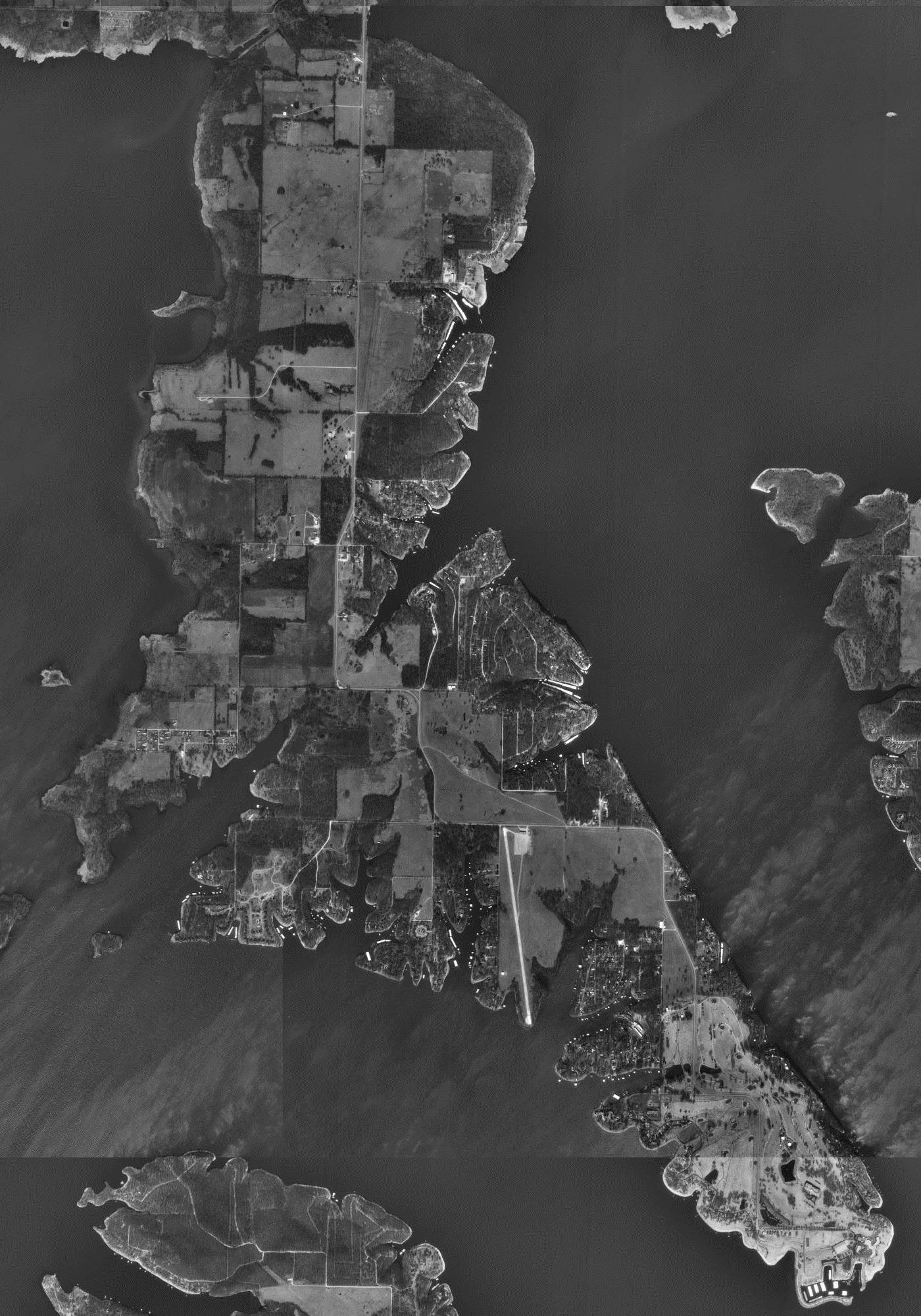
A USGS orthophoto from 1995

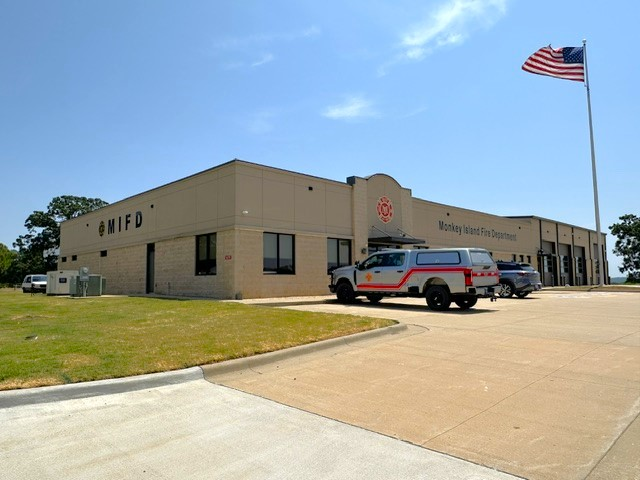
Monkey Island Fire Department in August of 2026

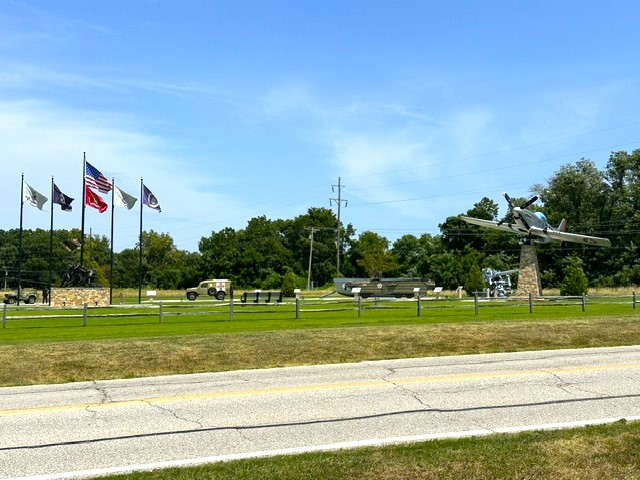
Legacy of Liberty Memorial Park, August 2026

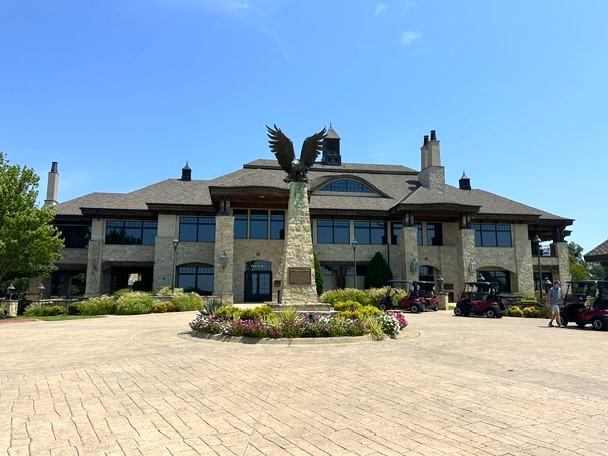
Shangri-La Clubhouse on Monkey Island in August of 2026
