= Scott Field (Oklahoma) =

Coordinates: 34°53′33″N 099°31′42″W

- IATA: none; ICAO: none; FAA LID: 2K4

Summary
- Airport type: Public
- Owner: City of Mangum
- Serves: Mangum, Oklahoma
- Elevation AMSL: 1,643 ft / 501 m
- Interactive map of Scott Field

Runways
Direction	Length		Surface
Direction	ft	m	Surface
17/35	4,200	1,280	Asphalt

Statistics (2006)
- Aircraft operations: 3,000
- Source: Federal Aviation Administration

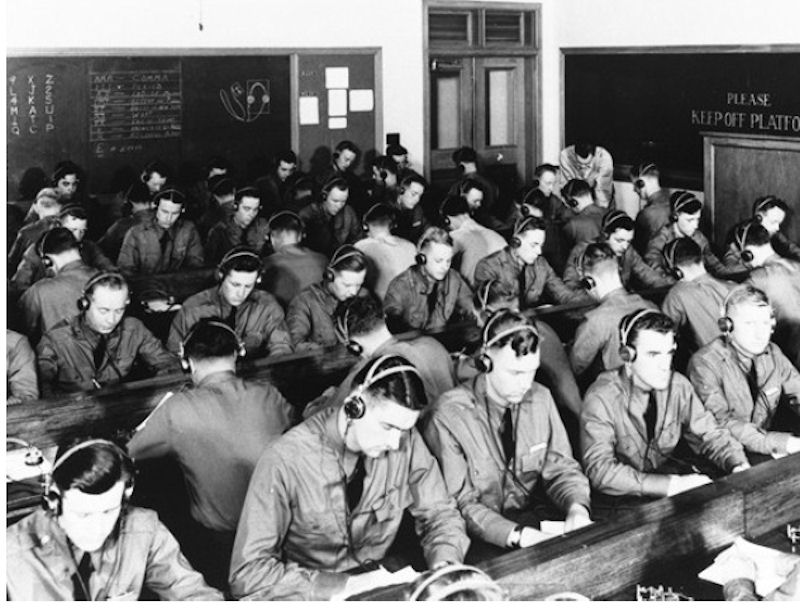
A Morse Code training class at Scott Field in 1942

Scott Field (FAA LID: 2K4) is a public airport located two miles (3 km) northwest of the central business district of Mangum, a city in Greer County, Oklahoma, United States. It is owned by the City of Mangum.

== Facilities and aircraft ==
Scott Field covers an area of 151 acres (61 ha) which contains one asphalt paved runway (17/35) measuring 4,200 x 75 ft (1,280 x 23 m). For the 12-month period ending January 24, 2006, the airport had 3,000 aircraft operations, 100% of which were general aviation.

== See also ==
- List of airports in Oklahoma
