= Stilwell/Cherokee Nation Airport =

- IATA: none; ICAO: none; FAA LID: O11

Summary
- Airport type: Public
- Owner: Cherokee Nation
- Serves: Stilwell, Oklahoma
- Elevation AMSL: 1,084 ft (330 m)
- Coordinates: 35°45′25″N 094°38′59″W

Map
- Location of airport in Oklahoma

Runways
Direction	Length		Surface
Direction	ft	m	Surface
18/36	4,200	1,280	Asphalt
- Source: Federal Aviation Administration

Stilwell/Cherokee Nation Airport (FAA LID: O11) is a public airport located three miles (5 km) southwest of the central business district of Stilwell, in Adair County, Oklahoma, United States. It is owned by the Cherokee Nation.

This airport was included in the National Plan of Integrated Airport Systems for 2007–2011, which categorized it as a general aviation facility.

== Facilities ==
Stilwell/Cherokee Nation Airport covers an area of 109 acres (44 ha) at an elevation of 1,084 feet (330 m) above mean sea level. It has one asphalt paved runway designated 18/36 which measures 4,200 by 60 feet (1,280 x 18 m).
