= List of state highways in Oklahoma =

- Highway markers for State Highways 3, 51, and 152

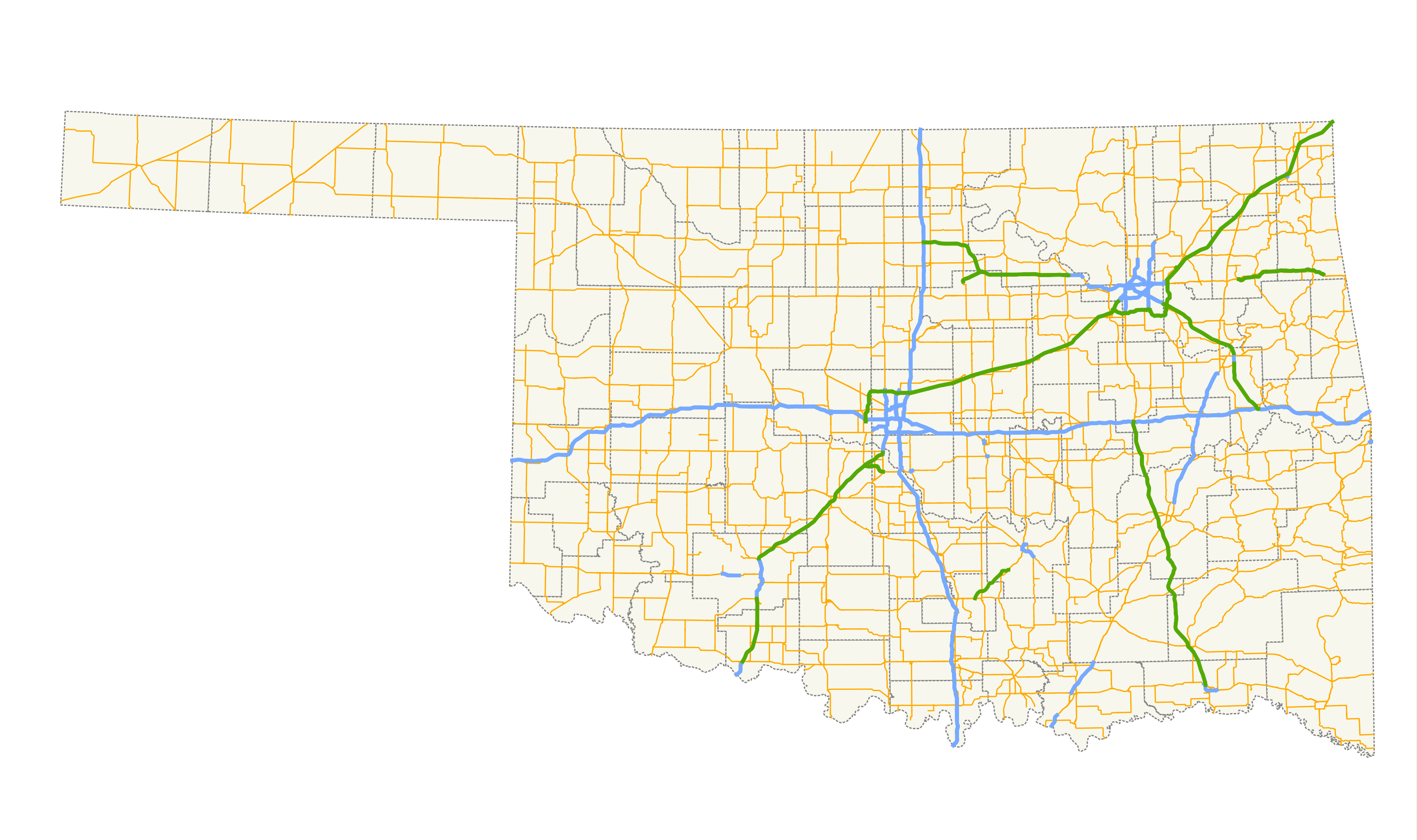
- Map showing Oklahoma's numbered highways

Highway names
- Interstates: Interstate nn (I-nn)
- US Highways: U.S. Highway nn (US nn)
- State: State Highway nn (SH-nn)

System links
- Oklahoma State Highway System; Interstate; US; State; Turnpikes

Oklahoma has a large network of numbered highways maintained by the state. These roads fall into one of three categories: Interstate Highways, U.S. Highways, and state highways. Interstate and U.S. Highways are continuous with surrounding states, while state highways are not (though Oklahoma and another state's department of transportation may coordinate numbering).

The majority of the numbered highways within Oklahoma are maintained by the Oklahoma Department of Transportation (ODOT). The only exceptions are sections of Interstate 44 (I-44) and U.S. Highway 412 (US 412), which run along turnpikes maintained by the Oklahoma Turnpike Authority (OTA). (I-44 runs along the H.E. Bailey, Turner, and Will Rogers turnpikes; US 412 is signed along the Cimarron and Cherokee turnpikes.)

Individual counties may establish a numbering system to apply to roads that they maintain. These highways are not listed here.

== State highways ==
Oklahoma's state highways serve as the second-lowest tier on the Oklahoma road system. They are marked with a number contained inside an outline of the state, having been formerly marked inside a white circle in a black box until January 2006.

SH-81 has not been issued for a state highway so that is not confused with US Highways and Interstates bearing the same number designation. SH-35 has been issued, but it is only for a short spur, far from I-35. SH-60, SH-62, SH-69, and SH-75 were once assigned but these designation have since been revoked. Other two-digit highways that have yet to be assigned include: SH-12, SH-13, SH-21, SH-41, SH-57, SH-61, SH-68, and SH-90. SH-40 was once issued, but was absorbed into U.S. Highway 177; see SH-40A. SH-41 was an east–west route across west-central Oklahoma that began at the intersection of S.W. 29th and May Avenue in Oklahoma City and veered southwest to Mustang, Union City and Minco before continuing west through Binger, Eakly, Cordell and Sayre and then crossing the Texas border near Sweetwater. It was redesignated as SH-152 over its entire length in 1955. Across the Texas Panhandle, the highway continues as TX-152 to Dumas, Texas. SH-61 had a strange east–west route across south-central Oklahoma that started at SH-13 (now SH-3W). It headed south, passing through Vanoss and then to Roff, where it turned east to Fittstown, where it headed south with SH-99 until turning east again. The road turned north in Jessie, went north until it turned back east north of Stonewall, and turned east again until it ended at SH-48 in Luna.

Many Oklahoma state highways have short spur routes connecting them to towns which lie off the main route. Many times, these bear the same number as the parent highway, with a letter suffix. Some state highway spurs and loops from US highways have designations that are drawn from the parent US Highway designation.

As higher-level roads replaced sections of some routes, those sections sometimes had their designation revoked. This led to some highways being fragmented, missing one or more sections in the middle of the road. There are also a few unrelated highways that are designated in completely different parts of the state with the same number.

Number	Length (mi)	Length (km)	Southern or western terminus	Northern or eastern terminus	Formed	Removed	Notes
SH-1	209.7	337.5	US-177/SH-199 between Mannsville and Madill	AR 88 at the AR state line	1968	current	
SH-1	—	—	—	—	1924	1933	Became part of SH-51
SH-1	—	—	—	—	1933	1962	Supplanted by I-40
SH-2	143.0	230.1	SH-3 west of Antlers US-60/US-69 in Vinita	US-64 in Warner US-59 toward Chetopa, KS	c. 1934	current	Exists in two segments; middle section became US-64, US-62 and US-69
SH-2	—	—	TX state line	KS state line	1924	1930	Became US-81
SH-2A	—	—	Goodland	US 271 south of Hugo	1934	1986	Now SH-271A
SH-3	615.0	989.7	US 287/US 385 toward Campo, CO	AR 32 toward Foreman, AR	1937	current	Longest state highway in Oklahoma
SH-3	—	—	—	—	1924	1931	Became US-270
SH-3A	—	—	—	—	c. 1979	c. 2009	
SH-3B	1.32	2.12	SH-7 in Atoka	US-75 / SH-3 in Atoka	c. 1985	current	
SH-3E	58.4	94.0	I-40/US-177/US-270/SH-3 northwest of Shawnee	SH-1/SH-3/SH-19 west of Ada	1976	current	Merges with SH-3W at either end to form SH-3
SH-3W	50.6	81.4	I-40/US-177/US-270/SH-3 northwest of Shawnee	SH-1/SH-3/SH-19 west of Ada	1976	current	Merges with SH-3E at either end to form SH-3
SH-4	41.7	67.1	I-44/Norman Spur Turnpike south of Bridge Creek	Piedmont	1941	current	
SH-4	12.01	19.33	US-259 in Smithville	AR 4 at the AR state line	1963	current	Formerly SH-21
SH-4	—	—	—	—	1924	1930	Became US-77
SH-5	20.42	32.86	US-62 in Gould	SH-6 in Eldorado	1924	current	
SH-5	98.2	158.0	US-283 south of Altus	US-70 in Waurika	1924	current	
SH-5A	8.00	12.87	US-277/US-281 at Cookietown	SH-5 west of Temple	1947	current	
SH-5B	7.00	11.27	US-70 at Taylor	SH-5A east of Cookietown	1950	current	
SH-5C	8.48	13.65	SH-5 in Tipton	US-183 in Manitou	1954	current	
SH-6	121.8	196.0	TX 6 at the TX state line	SH-152 east of Sweetwater	1954	current	
SH-6	—	—	—	—	1924	1930	Became US-73 and US-75, now US-75/US-69
SH-7	150.5	242.2	I-44/US-277/US-281 in Lawton	US-69/US-75/SH-3 in Atoka	1941	current	
SH-7	—	—	—	—	1924	1935	Became US-69
SH-7	—	—	—	—	1935	1936	Became SH-37
SH-7	—	—	—	—	1936	1937	Became a portion of SH-10 in 1955 or 1956
SH-7A	—	—	—	—	1944	1988	
SH-7B	—	—	US-77 near Turner Falls	SH-7 west of Davis	1948	1956	
SH-7B	1.99	3.20	SH-81A in Duncan	SH-7 in Duncan	1961	current	
SH-7C	—	—	Dougherty	SH-7 in Davis	1948	1956	Renumbered as SH-110
SH-7D	3.50	5.63	SH-7 south of Bromide	Bromide	1954	current	
SH-7 Spur	4	6.4	SH-7 west of Sulphur	US-177 north of Sulphur	2011	current	Previously a segment of the Chickasaw Turnpike
SH-8	179.1	288.2	US-277/SH-19 north of Cyril	K-8 at the KS state line	1924	current	
SH-8A	4.78	7.69	SH-8 north of Watonga	SH-51A west of Roman Nose State Park	1944	current	
SH-8B	1.00	1.61	Aline	SH-8 east of Aline	—	—	
SH-9	348.1	560.2	TX 203 at the TX state line	I-540/US 271 at the AR state line	1924	current	
SH-9A	33.31	53.61	SH-39 in Konawa	I-40 northeast of Shawnee	1947	current	
SH-9A	4.11	6.61	US-69 north of Canadian	SH-9	1950	current	
SH-9A	8.50	13.68	US-271/SH-9 east of Spiro	AR state line east of Arkoma	1959	current	Former US-271
SH-10	233.1	375.1	SH-99 west of Herd	I-40 southeast of Gore	1924	current	
SH-10A	6.14	9.88	SH-10 southeast of Braggs	SH-100 near Tenkiller Ferry Dam	1959	current	
SH-10C	4.37	7.03	SH-10 east of Miami	Route U at the MO state line	1954	current	
SH-11	204.9	329.8	US-281 north of Alva	I-244 in Tulsa	1924	current	
SH-11A	5.00	8.05	SH-11 west of Medford	Wakita	1956	current	
SH-12	—	—	SH-7 south of Mill Creek	US-177/SH-199 east of Mannsville	1924	1985	Became part of SH-1
SH-12	0.100	0.161	—	—	2012	2014	Was proposed for Gilcrease Expressway, was to take effect in 2014, but never got assigned
SH-13	—	—	—	—	1924	1930	Transferred to US-164 (became US-60 in 1931)
SH-13	—	—	—	—	1937	1976	Became SH-3W
SH-14	27.85	44.82	US-281/SH-45 in Waynoka	US-64/US-281 in Alva	1924	current	
SH-15	109.5	176.2	TX 15 at the TX state line US-64/US-412/SH-74 south of Garber	US-183/US-270/SH-3 in Woodward SH-18 north of Pawnee	1924	current	Exists in two segments; middle section became US-412 in 1988
SH-15A	—	—	—	—	c. 1948	1956	Became SH-34 and SH-34C
SH-16	99.2	159.6	SH-33/SH-99 in Drumright	SH-51 in Wagoner	1937	current	
SH-16	—	—	—	—	1924	1935	Became US-169
SH-17	20.86	33.57	US-277 in Elgin	US-81 Bus. in Rush Springs	1937	current	
SH-17	—	—	—	—	1924	1935	Became US-59
SH-17A	3.10	4.99	I-35 southwest of Wynnewood	US-77 south of Wynnewood	1983	current	
SH-18	134.4	216.3	US-270 in Shawnee	K-15 at the KS state line	1924	current	
SH-18A	0.39	0.63	US-177 in Chickasaw National Recreation Area	Veterans' hospital	—	—	
SH-18B	4.63	7.45	SH-18 south of Chandler	Sparks	1953	current	
SH-18W	—	—	—	—	1948	1970	eliminated from system
SH-19	171.7	276.3	US-283/SH-6 in Blair	SH-1/SH-3 west of Ada	1924	current	
SH-19A	—	—	SH-19 west of Pauls Valley	SH-7 in Hoover	1947	1960	
SH-19B	—	—	SH-19A southwest of Pauls Valley	US-77 in Pauls Valley	1950	1956	
SH-19C	0.48	0.77	SH-19 south of Alex	Alex	1961	current	unsigned
SH-19D	0.30	0.48	SH-19 in Bradley	North of Bradley	1961	current	unsigned
SH-20	142.7	229.7	SH-18 south of Fairfax	Route 43 at the MO state line (overlapped with AR 43)	1924	current	
SH-21	—	—	—	—	1924	1963	Became part of SH-3, US-259, and SH-4(E)
SH-22	47.4	76.3	SH-1 in Ravia	US-70 in Bokchito	1924	current	
SH-22S	—	—	—	—	1937	1938	Renumbered SH-299
SH-23	35.3	56.8	TX 23 at the TX state line	K-23 at the KS state line	1958	current	Former portion of SH-15
SH-23	—	—	—	—	1924	1931	Became part of US-270
SH-23	—	—	—	—	1935	1958	Renumbered to SH-123
SH-24	21.1	34.0	SH-74 north of Maysville	SH-74 in Goldsby	1937	current	
SH-24	—	—	—	—	1924	1932	transferred to US-283
SH-25	12.07	19.42	SH-2 at Pyramid Corners	US-59/US-69 in Narcissa	1924	current	
SH-25	5.20	8.37	SH-10 east of Grove	Route O at the MO state line	—	—	
SH-26	7.97	12.83	SH-31 in McCurtain	SH-9 west of Keota	1938	current	
SH-26	—	—	—	—	1924	1930	became part of US-177
SH-27	14.7	23.7	SH-9 west of Wetumka	US-62/SH-56 in Okemah	1942	current	
SH-27	—	—	—	—	1924	1942	became a part of SH-56
SH-28	68.4	110.1	US-169 south of Delaware	SH-20 west of Jay	1924	current	
SH-28A	4.56	7.34	SH-66 in Foyil	SH-28 east of Foyil	1957	current	
SH-29	58.5	94.1	US-81 in Marlow	US-177 north of Sulphur	1924	current	
SH-29A	0.48	0.77	Foster	SH-29 north of Foster	1961	current	
SH-30	84.4	135.8	US-62 in Hollis	Durham	1936	current	
SH-30	—	—	—	—	1926	1930	became a part of US-64
SH-31	132.6	213.4	SH-48 south of Tupelo	US-59/US-271 north of Panama	1933	current	
SH-31A	4.46	7.18	SH-31 north of Ashland	US-270/SH-1 north of Stuart	1948	current	
SH-31B	3.44	5.54	Olney	SH-31 northeast of Clarita	1986	current	
SH-32	77.3	124.4	US-81 in Ryan	US-70 in Kingston	1934	current	
SH-32	—	—	—	—	1927	1942	Became a portion of SH-5
SH-33	234.4	377.2	TX 33 at the TX state line	US-75 Alt./SH-66/SH-97 in Sapulpa	1927	current	
SH-33C	—	—	—	—	c. 1957	1989	Renumbered to SH-412A
SH-33G	—	—	—	—	c. 1986	1989	Renumbered to SH-412B
SH-34	188.3	303.0	SH-6 northeast of Eldorado	K-1 at the KS state line	1931	current	
SH-34	—	—	—	—	1927	1930	Became a portion of US-75
SH-34A	1.00	1.61	Willow	US-283/SH-34 east of Willow	c. 1943	current	unsigned
SH-34B	1.03	1.66	Brinkman	US-283 / SH-34 east of Brinkman	c. 1943	current	unsigned
SH-34C	4.52	7.27	SH-34 north of Woodward	Boiling Springs State Park	c. 1956	current	
SH-35	0.85	1.37	Osage Hills State Park	US-60 west of Bartlesville	1944	current	Unsigned
SH-35	—	—	—	—	1927	1938	Became a portion of SH-3
SH-36	44.4	71.5	I-44 / US-277/US-281 southwest of Randlett	I-44 / US-277/US-281 south of Lawton	c. 1926	current	
SH-36A	—	—	—	—	c. 1953	c. 1978	
SH-37	65.8	105.9	US-281/SH-8 in Hinton	Sunnylane Road in Moore	1937	current	
SH-37	12.54	20.18	TX 37 at the TX state line	US-70 Byp. in Idabel	1956	current	Formerly numbered SH-57
SH-37	—	—	—	—	1927	1935	Became a portion of SH-9
SH-38	14.76	23.75	US-64 in Jet	SH-11 west of Medford	c. 1961	current	
SH-38	—	—	—	—	1927	1940	Became a portion of US-287
SH-38	—	—	—	—	1941	1961	Became a portion of SH-45
SH-39	68.4	110.1	US-62/US-277/SH-9 at Tabler	US-377/SH-3E/SH-56/SH-99 southeast of Konawa	c. 1936	current	
SH-39	—	—	—	—	1927	1930	Became a portion of US-66
SH-40	—	—	US-66 in Warwick	US-60/US-77 in Ponca	1927	1965	Became US-177
SH-40A	0.35	0.56	US-177 west of Carney	Carney	1986	current	
SH-41	—	—	—	—	c. 1927	1954	Renumbered to SH-152
SH-42	1.43	2.30	Dill City	SH-152 north of Dill City	1939	current	
SH-42	—	—	—	—	1927	1937	Existed in two sections; one section became a portion of SH-11 in 1936 or 1937 and the other section was removed from the highway system after 1937 (this section became a portion of SH-6 by 1948)
SH-43	65.6	105.6	US-75/SH-3 in Coalgate	SH-2 northeast of Clayton	1942	current	
SH-43	—	—	—	—	1927	1933	Became a portion of SH-2
SH-43	—	—	—	—	1935	1937	Former SH-63, removed from the state highway system; now portions of SH-9 and SH-71
SH-44	59.2	95.3	US-283 north of Blair	SH-33 in Butler	1932	current	
SH-44	—	—	—	—	1927	1928	Became a portion of SH-48 (now SH 99)
SH-44	—	—	—	—	1928	1932	Became SH-74 so number could be reused for longer road
SH-44A	1.43	2.30	SH-44 southwest of Lugert	Quartz Mountain State Park	1950	current	
SH-45	64.7	104.1	US-281/SH-14 in Waynoka	US-60/US-64/US-81 in Enid	c. 1927	current	
SH-46	49.3	79.3	US-60 / US-283 / SH-51 in Arnett	US-64 west of Buffalo	1939	current	
SH-46	—	—	—	—	1927	1930	Became US-54
SH-47	94.6	152.2	FM 2124 at the TX state line	SH-33 in Thomas	1936	current	Decommissioned in 1937 but restored in 1939
SH-47	—	—	—	—	1927	1930	Became a portion of SH-15
SH-47A	2.15	3.46	SH-47 west of Cheyenne	SH-47 west of Cheyenne	1965	current	
SH-47A	—	—	—	—	1950	1954	Turned over to Reydon
SH-48	159.5	256.7	SH-78 north of Durant	US-64/US-412 southeast of Cleveland	1941	current	
SH-48	—	—	—	—	1927	1941	Renumbered SH-99
SH-48A	9.39	15.11	SH-78 in Milburn	SH-48 at Coleman	1950	current	
SH-49	30.0	48.3	SH-54 south of Cooperton	I-44 / US-62 / US-277 / US-281 north of Lawton	1927	current	
SH-50	37.7	60.7	US-183 / US-270 / SH-3 southeast of Woodward	US-64 at Camp Houston	1927	current	
SH-50A	0.54	0.87	SH-50 southwest of Freedom	Alabaster Caverns State Park	1959	current	
SH-50B	4.56	7.34	Boiling Springs State Park	SH-50 north of Mooreland	c. 1958	current	Formerly part of SH-34C
SH-51	332.8	535.6	US 60 at the TX state line (concurrent with US-60)	AR 244 at the AR state line	1927	current	
SH-51A	22.40	36.05	SH-8 north of Watonga	SH-58 south of Fairview	1950	current	
SH-51B	18.49	29.76	SH-72 in Coweta	US-69 south of Wagoner	1954	current	
SH-51C	—	—	SH-51 west of Stillwater	Lake Carl Blackwell	—	2005	
SH-51D	—	—	SH-51 south of Sand Springs	I-244 in Tulsa	—	c. 1977	
SH-52	4.06	6.53	Hanna	SH-9 north of Hanna	1941	current	
SH-52	16.46	26.49	US-266 northeast of Grayson	SH-16 west of Bald Hill	1941	current	
SH-52	—	—	—	—	1927	1931	Transferred to US-62
SH-53	87.6	141.0	SH-5 in Walters	US-177 east of Gene Autry	1928	current	
SH-53A	1.00	1.61	Gene Autry	SH-53 north of Gene Autry	1973	current	
SH-53A	—	—	—	—	1948	2004	
SH-54	9.96	16.03	US-70 west of Grandfield	SH-5 north of Hollister	1956	current	
SH-54	85.5	137.6	US-62 southeast of Snyder	SH-33 east of Thomas	1941	current	
SH-54A	3.50	5.63	Corn	SH-54 east of Corn	—	—	
SH-54B	3.27	5.26	SH-54 west of Colony	Colony	—	—	
SH-55	39.9	64.2	SH-34 in Carter	SH-54 at Lake Valley	1932	current	not on maps until 1937
SH-56	86.7	139.5	US-377 / SH-3E / SH-39 / SH-99 southeast of Konawa	US-62 in Okmulgee	1929	current	Former portion of SH-48
SH-57	—	—	—	—	1932	1955	Became the southeastern SH-37
SH-58	72.7	117.0	SH-49 east of Medicine Park	Blaine–Custer County line north of Hydro	1945	current	Former routing of SH-54
SH-58	105.9	170.4	US-270 / US-281 / SH-3 / SH-33 west of Watonga	Kansas state line south of Attica, Kan.	c. 1931	current	
SH-58A	5.33	8.58	SH-51 west of Canton	SH-58 northeast of Canton	—	—	
SH-59	93.0	149.7	SH-39 north of Criner	US-270 Bus. / SH-56 in Wewoka	1932	current	
SH-59A	5.27	8.48	US-177 / SH-59 east of Byars	SH-3W northwest of Ada	—	—	
SH-59B	5.69	9.16	SH-19 east of Lindsay	SH-59 west of Payne	—	—	
SH-59B	6.93	11.15	SH-102 west of Macomb	US-177 / SH-3W west of Chisney	—	—	
SH-60	—	—	SH-14 near Bessie	US-66 in Weatherford	1937	1938	Became parts of SH-54 and SH-54A
SH-61	—	—	—	—	1934	1941	Became a portion of SH-7
SH-61	—	—	—	—	1944	1968	Turned over to Pontotoc County
SH-61A	—	—	—	—	1948	1985	Renumbered to SH-99A
SH-62	—	—	—	—	1944	1961	removed from state highway system
SH-63	96.7	155.6	US-69 in Kiowa	AR 8 at the AR state line	1935	current	
SH-63	—	—	—	—	1933	1935	renumbered to SH-43 so the number can be reused to renumber SH 10A (now part of SH 9 and SH 71)
SH-63A	2.40	3.86	SH-1 / SH-63 west of Talihina	—	—	—	Highway branches into two and has three termini
SH-64A	—	—	—	—	c. 1964	c. 1971	Became US-64
SH-64B	11.39	18.33	I-40 south of Muldrow	SH-101 north of Muldrow	c. 1958	current	
SH-64C	—	—	—	—	c. 1973	c. 1975	Removed from the highway system
SH-64D	3.65	5.87	US-64 north of Moffett	I-40 west of Dora, AR	c. 1973	current	
SH-65	44.4	71.5	US-70 south of Temple	SH-17 in Sterling	c. 1932	current	
SH-66	192.7	310.1	I-40 Bus./US-81 in El Reno	US-60 northeast of White Oak	1985	current	Former US-66
SH-66	—	—	—	—	1936	1985	renumbered to SH-66B when modern SH-66 was established
SH-66A	—	—	SH-3 / SH-74 in Oklahoma City	I-44 / SH-66 in Oklahoma City	—	c. 1979	Renumbered to SH-3A
SH-66B	3.26	5.25	SH-66 west of Wellston	SH-66 east of Wellston	1985	current	Established as SH-66 when US-66 was active, renumbered to SH-66B when modern SH-66 was established
SH-67	9.94	16.00	US-75 Alt. in Kiefer	US-64 in Bixby	1936	current	
SH-68	—	—	—	—	1932	1970	Turned over to Hughes County
SH-69	—	—	—	—	1944	1987	Became parts of SH-54A, SH-54B, and SH-183A, and the remainder turned over to Washita County
SH-69A	5.15	8.29	SH-10 in Miami	US-69 east of Commerce	—	—	
SH-69A	4.70	7.56	US-69 south of Pryor	Sportsman Acres	1951	current	
SH-70	—	—	—	—	1948	1955	Became SH-106
SH-70A	6.81	10.96	Lake Texoma	US-70 in Kingston	—	—	
SH-70B	5.71	9.19	Lake Texoma	US-70 in Kingston	—	—	
SH-70C	0.32	0.51	US-70 in Randlett	Randlett	—	—	
SH-70D	0.30	0.48	US-70 in Devol	Devol	—	—	
SH-70E	31.87	51.29	SH-78 south of Durant	US-70 north of Bennington	—	—	
SH-70F	4.56	7.34	SH-32 west of Kingston	US-70 south of Madill	—	—	
SH-71	20.92	33.67	SH-31 in Quinton	SH-2 south of Porum	1944	current	
SH-71	—	—	—	—	1937	1938	Former portion of SH-43, removed from the state highway system; became a portion of SH-70E
SH-72	32.9	52.9	US-266 south of Council Hill	SH-51 in Coweta	1935	current	
SH-72	—	—	—	—	1931	1933	Became a portion of SH-22
SH-73	24.5	39.4	SH-34 south of Hammon	I-40 Bus. west of Clinton	1967	current	
SH-73	—	—	—	—	1938	1958	Became a portion of SH-6
SH-74	52.5	84.5	SH-7 near Tatums	I-35 in Goldsby	1937	current	
SH-74	91.5	147.3	I-44/SH-3/SH-66 in Bethany	SH-11 west of Deer Creek	c. 1931	current	Formerly SH-44
SH-74A	2.76	4.44	I-35 in Norman	US-77 in Norman	1936	c. 2009	
SH-74B	9.95	16.01	SH-76 south of Blanchard	SH-74 in Goldsby	—	—	
SH-74C	11.59	18.65	SH-74 in Crescent	US-77 north of Guthrie	—	—	
SH-74D	—	—	—	—	—	2018	
SH-74E	4.98	8.01	SH-51 south of Marshall	SH-74 east of Marshall	—	—	
SH-74F	8.05	12.96	SH-33 north of Cashion	SH-74 east of Cashion	—	—	
SH-74G	—	—	SH-74 in Purcell	I-35 in Purcell	—	c. 1995	date of cancellation unknown
SH-75	—	—	—	—	1944	1947	Renumbered to SH-75A
SH-76	100	160	South of Leon	SH-37 in Newcastle	1932	current	Former portion of SH-29
SH-77	—	—	Partial loop and spurs through Lake Murray State Park and road from East of Edmond to Oklahoma City		1954	1965	Section through Lake Murray State Park became SH-77D in 1960; section from SH-32 northward became SH-77 a year earlier; Section through Oklahoma City transferred to US 77
SH-77A	—	—	Partial loop and spurs through Lake Murray State Park		—	1952	Renumbered to SH-77S
SH-77C	—	—	—	—	—	1954	Became part of SH-53
SH-77C	0.47	0.76	US-77/SH-39/SH-74 in Purcell	US-77/SH-39 in Purcell	—	—	Unsigned
SH-77D	2.55	4.10	US-77 south of Davis	Falls Creek Baptist Conference Center	—	—	
SH-77H	13.75	22.13	US-77 in Norman	I-240/SH-3 in Oklahoma City	1955	current	
SH-77S	30.04	48.34	Partial loop and spurs through Lake Murray State Park		1951	current	
SH-78	60.0	96.6	TX 78 at the TX state line	US-377/SH-99 in Tishomingo	1956	current	
SH-78	—	—	—	—	1933	1948	Removed from state highway system; became SH-134 in 1957
SH-79	4.43	7.13	TX 79 at the TX state line	US-70 west of Waurika	c. 1938	current	
SH-80	20.47	32.94	US-62 / SH-10 in Fort Gibson	SH-51 in Hulbert	1952	current	
SH-80	—	—	—	—	1941	1951	Removed from state highway system
SH-80A	0.85	1.37	SH-80 in Fort Gibson	SH-80 in Fort Gibson	—	—	
SH-81A	0.71	1.14	US-81 in Duncan	US-81 in Duncan	—	—	
SH-82	43.2	69.5	SH-1 / SH-63 west of Talihina	SH-9 in Stigler	1940	current	
SH-82	99.2	159.6	I-40 south of Vian	US-60 / US-69 east of Vinita	—	—	
SH-82A	—	—	—	—	—	2018	
SH-83	11.36	18.28	US-59 north of Howe	AR 96 at the AR state line	1944	current	
SH-84	9.85	15.85	SH-9 in Dustin	US-75 east of Weleetka	c. 1940	current	
SH-85	13.41	21.58	SH-82 west of Ketchum	US-60/US-69 east of Vinita	1944	current	
SH-85A	5.68	9.14	SH-85 west of Bernice	SH-125 north of Monkey Island	—	—	
SH-86	12.06	19.41	SH-51 west of Stillwater	US-77 in Perry	1941	current	
SH-87	14.65	23.58	US-259 southeast of Harris	AR 108 at the AR state line	1944	current	
SH-88	26.0	41.8	Inola	US-169 south of Oologah	1941	current	
SH-89	30.3	48.8	FM 677 at the TX state line	SH-53 east of Loco	1944	current	
SH-90	—	—	—	—	c. 1941	1960	Split off from SH-30, became the western SH-5
SH-91	13.58	21.85	TX 91 south of Cartwright	SH-78 in Achille	1997	current	Former SH-75A
SH-91	—	—	—	—	c. 1948	1949	Removed from the state highway system; became SH-136 in 1956 or 1957
SH-92	18.09	29.11	US-62/US-277/SH-9 east of Chickasha	SH-37 in Tuttle	1942	current	
SH-92	—	—	—	—	1942	2010	Turned over to Yukon
SH-93	15.75	25.35	US-70 east of Hugo	SH-3 in Rattan	1953	current	
SH-94	14.92	24.01	US-412/SH-3 northwest of Hardesty	US-54/US-64 in Hooker	c. 1943	current	
SH-95	42.1	67.8	FM 1290 at the TX state line	US-56 south of Elkhart, KS	c. 1952	current	
SH-96	4.01	6.45	West of Burneyville	SH-32 north of Burneyville	c. 1957	current	
SH-97	19.86	31.96	US-75 Alt./SH-33/SH-66 in Sapulpa	Zink Ranch	1952	current	
SH-97T	—	—	—	—	2003	2004	
SH-98	19.67	31.66	SH-37 west of Idabel	SH-3 northwest of Glover	1954	current	
SH-98S	0.10	0.16	Wright City	SH-98 north of Wright City	—	—	Unsigned
SH-99	241.5	388.7	US 377 at the TX state line	K-99 at the KS state line	1938	current	Formerly SH-48
SH-99A	2.26	3.64	SH-99 south of Fittstown	Harden City	—	—	
SH-99A	22.46	36.15	SH-3E east of Shawnee	SH-48 west of Bearden	—	—	
SH-99B	1.09	1.75	SH-33/SH-99 in Drumright	SH-99 in Drumright	—	—	Former routing of SH-99
SH-99B	—	—	—	—	1948	1965	Renumbered SH-59
SH-99C	8.27	13.31	SH-32 east of Lebanon	US-377 / SH-99 southwest of Madill	—	—	
SH-99D	—	—	—	—	1981	1999	Bridge over Hominy Creek destroyed
SH-100	54.9	88.4	I-40 south of Webbers Falls	AR 156 at the AR state line	1954	current	
SH-101	23.11	37.19	US-59 north of Sallisaw	AR 220 at the AR state line	1954	current	
SH-102	52.20	84.01	Wanette	SH-66 south of Wellston	1955	current	
SH-103	—	—	—	—	1955	1963	Became part of US-259
SH-104	7.02	11.30	US-64/SH-72 in Haskell	SH-51B west of Porter	1955	current	
SH-105	29.11	46.85	SH-33 in Guthrie	SH-18 south of Agra	1955	current	
SH-106	—	—	—	—	1955	1994	Formerly SH-70, turned over to Marshall County
SH-107	—	—	—	—	1956	1961	Became a portion of rerouted SH-66 and SH-77 (now part of US 77)
SH-107	—	—	—	—	1972	1981	Still an active state highway with no number, Lincoln Boulevard in Oklahoma City
SH-107	—	—	—	—	1995	2000	Temporary designation for 23rd Street while under construction in Oklahoma City
SH-108	24.00	38.62	US-64 east of Morrison	SH-51 east of Stillwater	1955	current	
SH-109	53.90	86.74	US-70 in Boswell	US-70 in West Ft. Towson	1956	current	
SH-110	9.99	16.08	Dougherty	SH-7 in Davis	1957	current	Decommissioned 1965-1967 due to construction of Lake of the Arbuckles
SH-111	—	—	—	—	1957	1964	Turned over to McClain County; bridge over Walnut Creek destroyed
SH-112	24.6	39.6	US-59 / US-271 north of Poteau	SH-9A in Arkoma	1955	current	
SH-113	21.87	35.20	US-69 Bus. north of McAlester	US-69 in Canadian	1958	current	
SH-114	—	—	—	—	1957	1961	Became part of US-56
SH-115	57.2	92.1	US-62 in Cache	SH-152 east of Cordell	1957	current	
SH-116	11.55	18.59	US-59/SH-10 west of Colcord	AR 12 at the AR state line	1956	current	
SH-117	7.43	11.96	SH-33/SH-66 west of Sapulpa	US-75 north of Glenpool	1957	current	
SH-117A	0.75	1.21	SH-117 in Sapulpa	US-75 / SH-66 in Sapulpa	—	—	
SH-118	—	—	—	—	—	—	location unknown
SH-119	—	—	—	—	1957	1979	Became part of SH-11
SH-120	3.04	4.89	SH-112 in Rock Island	AR 10 at the AR state line	c. 1956	current	
SH-121	—	—	—	—	1957	1965	turned over to Latimer County
SH-122	—	—	—	—	1957	1966	Turned over to McClain County
SH-123	22.7	36.5	SH-11 east of Barnsdall	US-60 in Bartlesville	1960	current	
SH-124	—	—	—	—	1957	1970	removed from system
SH-125	25.7	41.4	Monkey Island	US-69 / SH-10 in Miami	c. 1958	current	
SH-126	—	—	—	—	c. 1957	c. 1966	Turned over to McClain County
SH-127	13.08	21.05	US-59/SH-10/SH-20 in Jay	US-59/SH-10 north of Jay	c. 1958	current	
SH-128	9.81	15.79	US-59/US-270 in Heavener	AR 28 at the AR state line	c. 1956	current	
SH-129	—	—	—	—	1958	1964	turned over to Potowatomie County
SH-130	3.00	4.83	SH-76 in Newcastle	US-62/US-277 in Newcastle	1957	current	Removed from the state highway system in 1965 but restored in 1979
SH-131	—	—	SH-31 northeast of Coalgate	US-69 southwest of Kiowa	1958	current	
SH-132	—	—	SH-51 west of Hennessey	K-179 at the KS state line	1956	current	
SH-133	6.6	10.6	SH-19 northeast of Pauls Valley	SH-59 west of Byars	c. 1958	current	
SH-134	—	—	—	—	1957	1957	Was SH-78 until 1947 or 1948, removed from system; became US-385 in 1958
SH-134	—	—	—	—	1963	1963	Was a portion of US-64 until 1948-1950, removed from system; now SH-325
SH-135	0.4	0.64	Main Street in Owasso	US-169 in Owasso	—	—	Unsigned highway
SH-136	40.5	65.2	TX 136 at the Texas state line	K-25 at the Kansas state line	1957	current	
SH-137	6.31	10.15	US-60 in Twin Bridges State Park	SH-10 east of Miami	1958	current	
SH-138	—	—	—	—	1959	1961	transferred to rerouted US-75
SH-139	—	—	—	—	—	—	location unknown
SH-140	—	—	—	—	1959	1970	turned over to Lincoln County
SH-141	—	—	US-59 south of Sallisaw	US-64 east of Gans	1959	current	
SH-142	—	—	I-35 north of Ardmore	SH-199 east of Ardmore	1960	current	
SH-143	—	—	—	—	1959	1986	renumbered as SH-31B
SH-144	—	—	US-271 southeast of Clayton	US-259 east of Octavia	1959	current	
SH-145	—	—	I-35 west of Paoli	US-77 in Paoli	1959	current	Decommissioned from 1969-1972
SH-146	—	—	SH-9 northwest of Fort Cobb	SH-152 west of Binger	1962	current	
SH-147	—	—	US-70 east of Sawyer	SH-3 east of Rattan	1959	current	
SH-148	—	—	—	—	—	—	location unknown
SH-149	8.0	12.9	US-283 in Laverne	SH-46 north of May	1961	current	
SH-150	—	—	US-69 north of Eufaula	I-40 west of Checotah	1965	current	
SH-151	—	—	SH-51 east of Mannford	US-412 west of Sand Springs	1965	current	
SH-152	149.2	240.1	TX 152 at the TX state line	I-44/SH-3 in Oklahoma City	1954	current	Formerly SH-41
SH-153	0.47	0.76	US-77 in Thackerville	Interstate 35	—	—	
SH-154	—	—	—	—	—	—	location unknown
SH-155	—	—	—	—	—	—	location unknown
SH-156	16.9	27.2	US-77/SH-15 south of Tonkawa	US-60/US-77/US-177 west of Ponca City	1965	current	Former routing of US-77
SH-157	—	—	—	—	—	—	location unknown
SH-158	—	—	—	—	—	—	location unknown
SH-159	—	—	—	—	1971	2004	removed from system
SH-160	—	—	—	—	1972	1984	transferred to US-177
SH-161	—	—	—	—	—	—	location unknown
SH-162	1.3	2.1	US-62/US-64/SH-16 south of Taft	Taft	1969	current	
SH-163	—	—	—	—	—	—	location unknown
SH-164	—	—	SH-74 in Covington	US-77 east of Lucien	1972	current	Former routing of US-64
SH-165	—	—	US-64 south of Muskogee	US-62 east of Muskogee	1970	current	
SH-166	0.69	1.11	SH-97 in Sapulpa	Frankoma Road in Sapulpa	1974	current	
SH-167	4.86	7.82	I-44/US-412 east of Tulsa	SH-266 east of Mingo	1975	current	
SH-170	—	—	—	—	1975	1976	shown on the 1975 map; may be a typo
SH-171	21.1	34.0	US-287 southeast of Boise City	US-56 in Keyes	c. 1976	current	
SH-198	—	—	—	—	1965	1985	Now SH-98S
SH-199	39.8	64.1	SH-142 in Ardmore	SH-78 near Brown	1938	current	Former SH-32
SH-209	2.25	3.62	US-70 in Fort Towson	Raymond Gary State Park	1962	current	
SH-251A	—	—	SH-16 in Okay	SH-80 north of Fort Gibson	1965	current	Former portion of SH-16 considering but there is no OK-251
SH-251B	—	—	SH-16 north of Okay	Sequoyah Bay Recreation Area	—	—	
SH-251C	—	—	SH-51 in Wagoner	Fort Gibson Wildlife Management Area	—	—	
SH-251D	—	—	US-69 west of Rocky Point	Whitehorn Cove	—	—	
SH-251E	—	—	US-69	Flat Rock Creek Campground	—	—	
SH-259A	—	—	US-259 north of Broken Bow	US-259 north of Broken Bow	—	—	
SH-266	—	—	US-169 north of Tulsa	SH-66 in Verdigris	1972	current	
SH-270	—	—	US-62 in Harrah	US-177 north of Shawnee	1979	current	Former routing of US-270
SH-270A	—	—	—	—	—	2018	Replaced by a realigned US-270
SH-271A	1.9	3.1	Goodland	US-271/SH-109 south of Hugo	—	—	
SH-281A	—	—	US-277/US-281 west of Geronimo	Geronimo	—	—	
SH-298	—	—	—	—	1974	c. 1982	Turned over to McCurtain County
SH-299	—	—	—	—	1939	1955	Former portion of SH-22, renumbered to SH-78
SH-301	13.30	21.40	US-177/SH-7 Spur	SH-1	2021	current	New number for Chickasaw Turnpike
SH-312	8.50	13.68	US-177 in Stillwater	US-412	2021	current	New number for Cimarron Spur to Stillwater
SH-325	38.7	62.3	NM 456 at the NM state line	US-287 / US-385 / SH-3 in Boise City	1989	current	
SH-344	5.65	9.09	I-44	US-412	2022	current	New number for north–south section of Gilcrease Expressway
SH-351	53.1	85.5	SH-51 in Broken Arrow	I-40 west of Webbers Falls	2014	current	Muskogee Turnpike
SH-364	33.22	53.46	I-44/Turner Tpk. in Sapulpa	I-44/Will Rogers Tpk./US-412 in Fair Oaks	2014	current	Creek Turnpike
SH-375	105.20	169.30	US-70	I-40	2021	current	New number for Indian Nation Turnpike
SH-412A	2.98	4.80	Oaks	US-412 Alt. at Twin Oaks	1989	current	Formerly SH-33C
SH-412B	5.33	8.58	US-412 west of Locust Grove	SH-69A west of Sportsman Acres	1989	current	Formerly SH-33G
SH-412P	1.26	2.03	US-412 east of Fair Oaks	Verdigris River	—	—	Not shown on maps

== See also ==
- List of Interstate Highways in Oklahoma
- List of U.S. Highways in Oklahoma
- List of unsigned Oklahoma State Highways
