= Oklahoma State Highway 133 =

State highway in Oklahoma, United States

State Highway 133

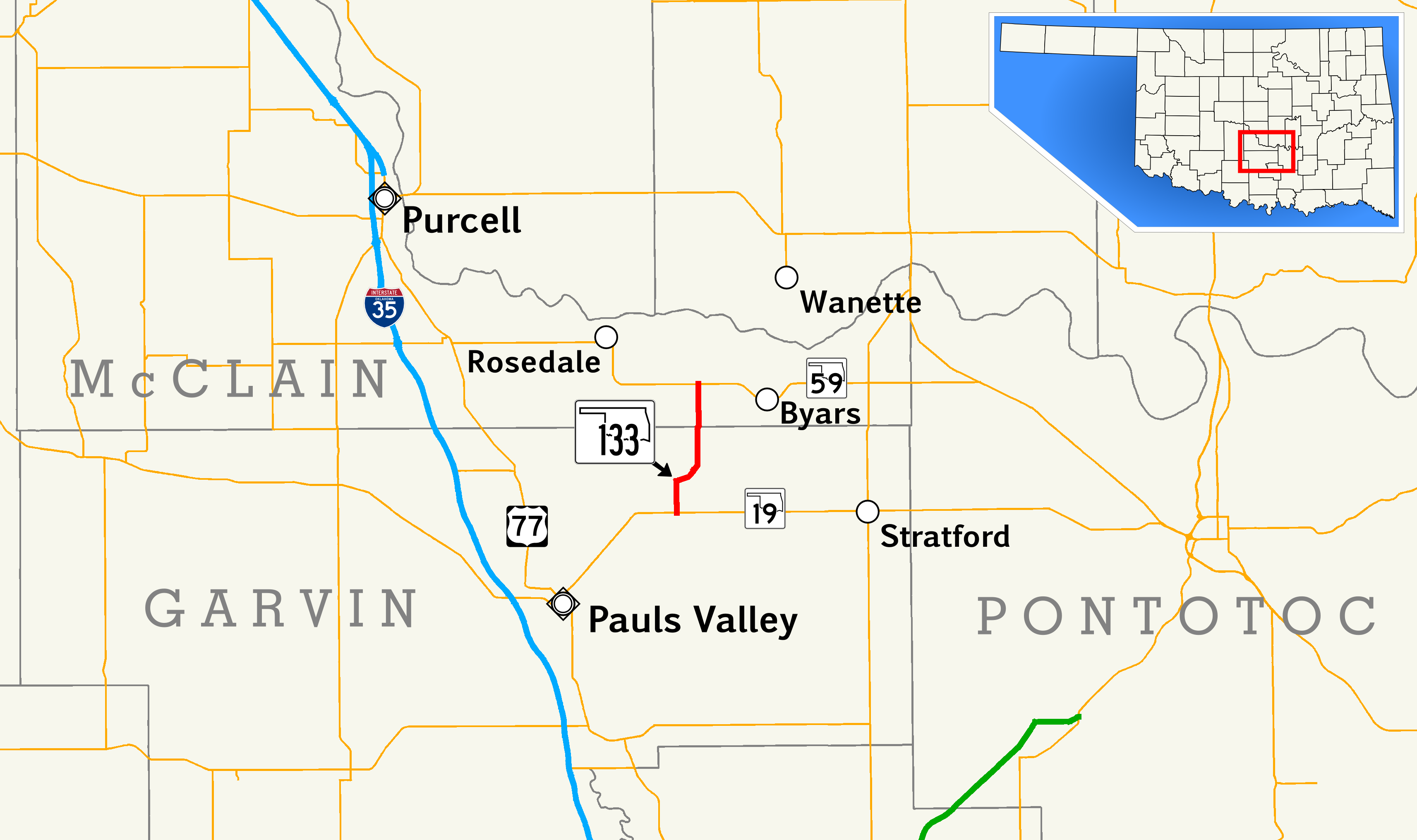

Route information
- Maintained by ODOT
- Length: 6.55 mi (10.54 km)
- Existed: ca. 1958–present

Major junctions
- South end: SH-19 northeast of Pauls Valley
- North end: SH-59 east of Rosedale

Location
- Country: United States
- State: Oklahoma

Highway system
- Oklahoma State Highway System; Interstate; US; State; Turnpikes
← SH-132	→ SH-135

State Highway 133 (abbreviated SH-133 or OK-133) is a short 6.6-mile (10.6 km) state highway in central Oklahoma, United States. It has no lettered spur routes.

SH-133 was first established in the late 1950s. Originally commissioned with a gravel surface, it was paved in the 1970s.

== Route description ==
SH-133's southern terminus is at SH-19 seven miles (11 km) northeast of Pauls Valley. The highway begins in Garvin County and crosses into McClain County 2.55 miles (4.10 km) north of SH-19. The highway ends two miles (3.2 km) north of the county line at SH-59 between Rosedale and Byars.

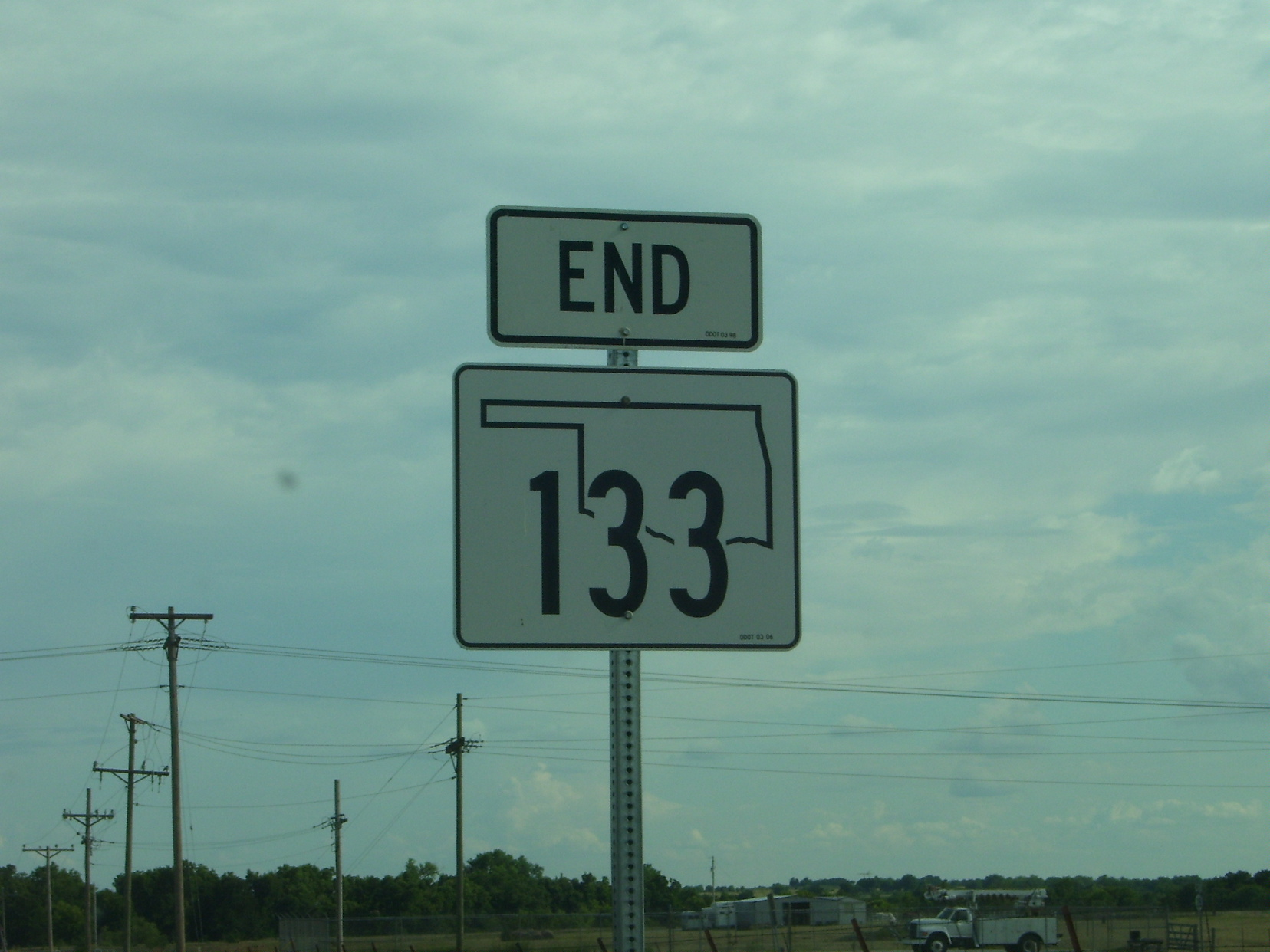
SH-133's southern terminus at SH-19.

== History ==
SH-133 first appeared on the 1959 state highway map, implying it was commissioned in either late 1958 or early 1959. Originally, the route was entirely gravel-surfaced but by 1963 the Garvin County portion had been paved. The road was entirely paved in 1972.

== Junction list ==
County	Location	mi	km	Destinations	Notes
Garvin		0.00	0.00	SH-19	Southern terminus
McClain		6.55	10.54	SH-59	Northern terminus
1.000 mi = 1.609 km; 1.000 km = 0.621 mi
