= Oklahoma State Highway 59 =

Highway in Oklahoma

State Highway 59
- OK 59; mainline in red, spur routes in blue

Route information
- Maintained by ODOT
- Length: 93.0 mi (149.7 km)
- Existed: 1932–present

Major junctions
- West end: SH-39 north of Criner
- I-35 near Wayne; US 77 in Wayne; US 377 / SH-3E / SH-99 in Bowlegs
- East end: US 270 Bus. / SH-56 in Wewoka

Location
- Country: United States
- State: Oklahoma

Highway system
- Oklahoma State Highway System; Interstate; US; State; Turnpikes
← US 59	→ US 60

State Highway 59, abbreviated SH-59, is a 93-mile (150 km) state highway in central Oklahoma. It runs from Criner, Oklahoma in McClain Co. to Wewoka.

== Route description ==
SH-59 begins at SH-39 north of Criner and immediately heads due south through that town. It turns due east six miles (9.6 km) north of Lindsay, serving Payne instead. After a one-mile (1.6 km) concurrency with SH-24, SH-59 crosses SH-74 and has an interchange with I-35.

Shortly after passing under the interstate, it meets US-77 south of Wayne, and passes through the small towns of Rosedale and Byars. Five miles (8 km) east of Byars, it meets U.S. Highway 177 and turns northward to join with it. SH-3W joins the concurrency five miles later.

The three highways cross over the South Canadian River to enter Pottawatomie Co. just south of Asher. In Asher, SH-59 meets SH-39 a second time, and six miles (10 km) later it splits off from US-177 and SH-3W to head east again, through St. Louis, Oklahoma and Maud. It forms a concurrency with US-377/SH-99/SH-3E south of Seminole, before splitting off near Bowlegs. It meets US-270 west of Wewoka, and then ends two miles (3 km) later.

== History ==
SH-59 was first added to the state highway system in 1932 and was entirely contained within McClain County, running from Wayne to State Highway 18 (present-day US-177). It was extended eastward to end at SH-48 (present-day US-377/SH-99) north of Bowlegs in 1947 or 1948. It was extended to its present eastern terminus in 1965 or 1966, and no significant changes have been made since.

== Spurs ==
=== SH-59A ===
State Highway 59A
- Location: McClain and Pontotoc counties
- Length: 5.27 mi (8.48 km)

SH-59A runs from US-177/SH-59 east to connect with SH-3W south of SH-59's own connection with the highway. This allows eastbound travelers to more easily access Ada. It is 5.27 miles (8.48 km) long.

=== SH-59B ===
State Highway 59B
- Location: Garvin and McClain counties
- Length: 5.69 mi (9.16 km)

SH-59B runs from SH-59 south to connect with SH-19 just east of Lindsay. It is 5.69 miles (9.16 km) long.

=== SH-59B ===
State Highway 59B
- Location: Macomb
- Length: 6.93 mi (11.15 km)

A second SH-59B runs east from SH-102 through Macomb, ending at US-177 / SH-3W north of Asher, a distance of 6.93 miles (11.15 km). (Neither Mapquest nor Google Maps show these endpoints; they instead indicate 59B runs from the vicinity of the Pottawatomie/Cleveland County line, well west of SH-102, east past that road to US-177. Google additionally shows 59B running past US-177 a short additional distance east to Oklahoma State Highway 18.) The highway's entire length lies in Pottawatomie County. SH-59B does not directly connect to SH-59.

== Junction list ==
County	Location	mi	km	Destinations	Notes
McClain		0.0	0.0	SH-39	Western terminus
McClain		7.8	12.6	SH-59B	Northern terminus of SH-59B
McClain		14.4	23.2	SH-24	Southern end of SH-24 concurrency
McClain		15.4	24.8	SH-24	Northern end of SH-24 concurrency
McClain		18.4	29.6	SH-74	
McClain		21.3	34.3	I-35	Diamond interchange, I-35 exit 86
McClain	Wayne	23.8	38.3	US 77	
McClain		37.5	60.4	SH-133	Northern terminus of SH-133
McClain		46.0	74.0	US 177 / SH-59A	Western terminus of SH-59A, southern end of US-177 concurrency
McClain		51.1	82.2	SH-3W	Southern end of SH-3W concurrency
Pottawatomie	Asher	53.8	86.6	SH-39	
Pottawatomie	Pearson	59.8	96.2	US 177 / SH-3W	Northern end of US-177/SH-3W concurrency
Pottawatomie	Maud	71.0	114.3	SH-9A	Western end of SH-9A concurrency
Pottawatomie	Maud	72.2	116.2	SH-9A	Eastern end of SH-9A concurrency
Seminole		80.0	128.7	US 377 / SH-3E / SH-99	Northern end of US-377/SH-3E/SH-99 concurrency
Seminole	Bowlegs	82.7	133.1	US 377 / SH-3E / SH-99	Southern end of US-377/SH-3E/SH-99 concurrency
Seminole	Wewoka	90.8	146.1	US 270	
Seminole	Wewoka	93.0	149.7	US 270 Bus. / SH-56	Eastern terminus
1.000 mi = 1.609 km; 1.000 km = 0.621 mi: Concurrency terminus
