= Logsdon =

Logsdon is a surname. Notable people with the surname include:

- Gene Logsdon (1931–2016), American author, critic and farmer
- Jimmie Logsdon (1922–2001), American country and rockabilly singer-songwriter
- John Logsdon, American political scientist
- Joseph Logsdon (1938–1999), American historian
- Mayme Logsdon (1881–1967), American mathematician
- Val Logsdon Fitch (1923–2015), American nuclear physicist

== See also ==
- Logsdon Seminary
