= Criner =

Criner is a surname. Notable people with the surname include:

- Jim Criner (born 1940), American football player and coach
- Juron Criner (born 1989), American football player
- Laurence Criner (fl. 1926–1950), American actor
- Mark Criner (born 1966), American football coach

== See also ==
- Criner, Oklahoma
