= Pocola, Oklahoma =

- Town
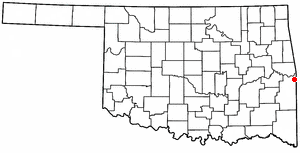
- Location of Pocola, Oklahoma
- Coordinates: 35°15′22″N 94°30′20″W
- Country: United States
- State: Oklahoma
- County: Le Flore

Area
  - Total: 30.56 sq mi (79.16 km^{2})
  - Land: 30.31 sq mi (78.50 km^{2})
  - Water: 0.25 sq mi (0.66 km^{2})
- Elevation: 453 ft (138 m)

Population (2020)
  - Total: 4,255
  - Density: 140.4/sq mi (54.21/km^{2})
- Time zone: UTC-6 (Central (CST))
  - Summer (DST): UTC-5 (CDT)
- ZIP code: 74902
- Area codes: 539/918
- FIPS code: 40-59750
- GNIS feature ID: 2412494
- Website: www.townofpocola.com

Pocola is a town in Le Flore County, Oklahoma, United States. As of the 2020 census, Pocola had a population of 4,255. Pocola is a Choctaw word meaning "ten", the approximate distance in miles from Fort Smith, Arkansas.

== History ==
The Battle of Devil's Backbone took place nearby on September 1, 1863, and resulted in a victory for the Union Army.

A post office was established at Pocola, Indian Territory on February 15, 1881. The community took its name from the Choctaw word for the number ten, as the site was ten miles from Fort Smith, Arkansas. At the time of its founding the settlement was located in Skullyville County, a part of the Moshulatubbee District of the Choctaw Nation.

Will Hartshorne began operating a small coal mine in this area during the 1880s. By 1895, he employed six men, and sold the mine to the Fort Smith and Western Coal and Railway in the following year. The population of Pocola was estimated at 200 in 1900, but the number declined to about 75 in 1918. The post office closed in 1916.

The community did not incorporate until 1963, allowing it to gain water rights along the McClellan-Kerr Arkansas River Navigation System and to ensure that the area was not annexed by other Le Flore County communities. The town began annexing land, enlarging itself to about 30 square miles. By 1970, the population had grown to 1,840. In 1980, the census recorded 3,268 residents. A post office was reestablished in 1986.

== Geography ==
According to the United States Census Bureau, the town has a total area of 30.5 square miles (79 km^{2}), of which 30.3 square miles (78 km^{2}) is land and 0.2 square miles (0.52 km^{2}) (0.69%) is water.

The Poteau River constitutes the western boundary of the town.

== Demographics ==
Historical population
Census	Pop.	Note	%±
1970	1,840		—
1980	3,268		77.6%
1990	3,664		12.1%
2000	3,994		9.0%
2010	4,056		1.6%
2020	4,255		4.9%
U.S. Decennial Census

=== 2020 census ===
As of the 2020 census, Pocola had a population of 4,255. The median age was 42.5 years. 21.1% of residents were under the age of 18 and 20.6% of residents were 65 years of age or older. For every 100 females there were 98.3 males, and for every 100 females age 18 and over there were 93.7 males age 18 and over.

2.8% of residents lived in urban areas, while 97.2% lived in rural areas.

There were 1,717 households in Pocola, of which 27.5% had children under the age of 18 living in them. Of all households, 48.2% were married-couple households, 18.6% were households with a male householder and no spouse or partner present, and 26.5% were households with a female householder and no spouse or partner present. About 28.2% of all households were made up of individuals and 12.2% had someone living alone who was 65 years of age or older.

There were 1,853 housing units, of which 7.3% were vacant. The homeowner vacancy rate was 0.6% and the rental vacancy rate was 6.5%.

Racial composition as of the 2020 census
Race	Number	Percent
White	3,113	73.2%
Black or African American	106	2.5%
American Indian and Alaska Native	470	11.0%
Asian	32	0.8%
Native Hawaiian and Other Pacific Islander	1	0.0%
Some other race	59	1.4%
Two or more races	474	11.1%
Hispanic or Latino (of any race)	174	4.1%

=== 2000 census ===
As of the census of 2000, there were 3,994 people, 1,508 households, and 1,165 families residing in the town. The population density was 131.9 inhabitants per square mile (50.9/km^{2}). There were 1,598 housing units at an average density of 52.8 per square mile (20.4/km^{2}). The racial makeup of the town was 86.35% White, 3.33% African American, 5.16% Native American, 0.25% Asian, 0.03% Pacific Islander, 0.45% from other races, and 4.43% from two or more races. Hispanic or Latino of any race were 1.88% of the population.

There were 1,508 households, out of which 35.7% had children under the age of 18 living with them, 59.8% were married couples living together, 12.7% had a female householder with no husband present, and 22.7% were non-families. 19.9% of all households were made up of individuals, and 7.5% had someone living alone who was 65 years of age or older. The average household size was 2.61 and the average family size was 2.98.

In the town, the population was spread out, with 26.5% under the age of 18, 8.8% from 18 to 24, 28.3% from 25 to 44, 24.5% from 45 to 64, and 11.9% who were 65 years of age or older. The median age was 36 years. For every 100 females, there were 95.8 males. For every 100 females age 18 and over, there were 95.1 males.

The median income for a household in the town was $33,566, and the median income for a family was $37,937. Males had a median income of $30,577 versus $20,529 for females. The per capita income for the town was $14,623. About 12.6% of families and 15.4% of the population were below the poverty line, including 20.5% of those under age 18 and 22.3% of those age 65 or over.

== Transportation ==
Pocola is served by U.S. Route 271; the highway continues northeast as Interstate 540 just over the Arkansas line and connects to Interstate 40 around Van Buren. The town is also served by Oklahoma State Highway 112.

Commercial air transportation is available out of Fort Smith Regional Airport, just to the northeast.
