= Oklahoma State Highway 251A =

Highway in Oklahoma

State Highway 251A
- SH-251A highlighted in red

Route information
- Maintained by ODOT
- Length: 6.06 mi (9.75 km)
- Existed: 1965–present

Major junctions
- West end: SH-16 in Okay
- East end: SH-80 north of Fort Gibson

Location
- Country: United States
- State: Oklahoma

Highway system
- Oklahoma State Highway System; Interstate; US; State; Turnpikes
← I-244	→ US 259

State Highway 251A, also known as SH-251A or OK-251A, is a highway maintained by the U.S. state of Oklahoma. The highway has a length of 5.37 miles (8.64 km) in Wagoner County and 0.69 miles (1.11 km) in Cherokee County, for a total length of 6.06 miles (9.75 km). The highway runs from State Highway 16 in Okay, Oklahoma to State Highway 80 north of Ft. Gibson. It runs across the dam of Fort Gibson Lake. The highway was once part of SH-16.

== Route description ==
SH-251A begins in Wagoner County at SH-16 in Okay and follows North York Road north out of town. Upon leaving town, the highway curves to the east. The highway proceeds due east until reaching the unincorporated settlement of Mallard Bay, where it curves to the southeast to avoid the eponymous bay. SH-251A curves back to the northeast, paralleling the short of Fort Gibson Lake, before reaching Fort Gibson Dam. The route crosses the Grand River along the top of the dam, entering Cherokee County in the process. After the SH-251A leaves the dam, it reaches its junction with SH-80 and ends.

== History ==
What is now SH-251A was originally added to the state highway system as part of a 1955 extension of SH-16. The highway was paved at this time. In 1965, SH-16 was realigned to head north from Okay instead of east, and the vacated section of highway was assigned the SH-251A designation. No changes to SH-251A have occurred since.

In April 2025, the section of SH-251A over the Fort Gibson Dam was closed to traffic due to deterioration of the road deck.

== Junction list ==
County	Location	mi	km	Destinations	Notes
Wagoner	Okay	0.00	0.00	SH-16	Western terminus
Cherokee		6.06	9.75	SH-80	Eastern terminus
1.000 mi = 1.609 km; 1.000 km = 0.621 mi
