= Rosedale, Oklahoma =

- Town
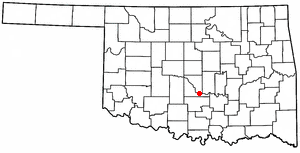
- Location in Oklahoma
- Coordinates: 34°55′08″N 97°11′05″W
- Country: United States
- State: Oklahoma
- County: McClain

Area
  - Total: 0.077 sq mi (0.20 km^{2})
  - Land: 0.077 sq mi (0.20 km^{2})
  - Water: 0 sq mi (0.00 km^{2})
- Elevation: 1,060 ft (320 m)

Population (2020)
  - Total: 62
  - Density: 793/sq mi (306.2/km^{2})
- Time zone: UTC-6 (Central (CST))
  - Summer (DST): UTC-5 (CDT)
- ZIP Code: 74831
- FIPS code: 40-64000
- GNIS feature ID: 2412577

Rosedale is a town in McClain County, Oklahoma, United States. The population was 62 at the 2020 census.

== Geography ==
Rosedale is in southeastern McClain County along State Highway 59, which leads east-southeast 10 miles (16 km) to Byars and west 7 miles (11 km) to Wayne. Purcell, the McClain county seat, is 15 miles (24 km) northwest of Rosedale.

According to the U.S. Census Bureau, the town of Rosedale has a total area of 0.08 square miles (0.21 km^{2}), all land. The Canadian River, a tributary of the Arkansas River, passes just north of the town.

== Demographics ==
Historical population
Census	Pop.	Note	%±
1940	112		—
1950	136		21.4%
1960	88		−35.3%
1970	98		11.4%
1980	97		−1.0%
1990	48		−50.5%
2000	66		37.5%
2010	68		3.0%
2020	62		−8.8%
U.S. Decennial Census

=== 2020 census ===
As of the 2020 census, Rosedale had a population of 62. The median age was 47.0 years. 11.3% of residents were under the age of 18 and 22.6% of residents were 65 years of age or older. For every 100 females there were 77.1 males, and for every 100 females age 18 and over there were 66.7 males age 18 and over.

0.0% of residents lived in urban areas, while 100.0% lived in rural areas.

There were 27 households in Rosedale, of which 37.0% had children under the age of 18 living in them. Of all households, 55.6% were married-couple households, 3.7% were households with a male householder and no spouse or partner present, and 37.0% were households with a female householder and no spouse or partner present. About 14.8% of all households were made up of individuals and 0.0% had someone living alone who was 65 years of age or older.

There were 36 housing units, of which 25.0% were vacant. The homeowner vacancy rate was 11.1% and the rental vacancy rate was 0.0%.

Racial composition as of the 2020 census
Race	Number	Percent
White	39	62.9%
Black or African American	1	1.6%
American Indian and Alaska Native	14	22.6%
Asian	0	0.0%
Native Hawaiian and Other Pacific Islander	0	0.0%
Some other race	4	6.5%
Two or more races	4	6.5%
Hispanic or Latino (of any race)	8	12.9%

=== 2000 census ===
The median household income was $11,875 and the median family income was $15,938. Males had a median income of $0 versus $16,750 for females. The per capita income for the town was $7,285. There were 53.3% of families and 53.3% of the population living below the poverty line, including 77.3% of under eighteens and none of those over 64.

== Notable people ==
- Jimmy Wakely, country-western singer and actor; raised in Rosedale
- Willis Whitfield, physicist and inventor of the "Cleanroom" used in the manufacture of IC chips; born in Rosedale
