= Oklahoma State Highway 112 =

State highway in Oklahoma, United States

State Highway 112

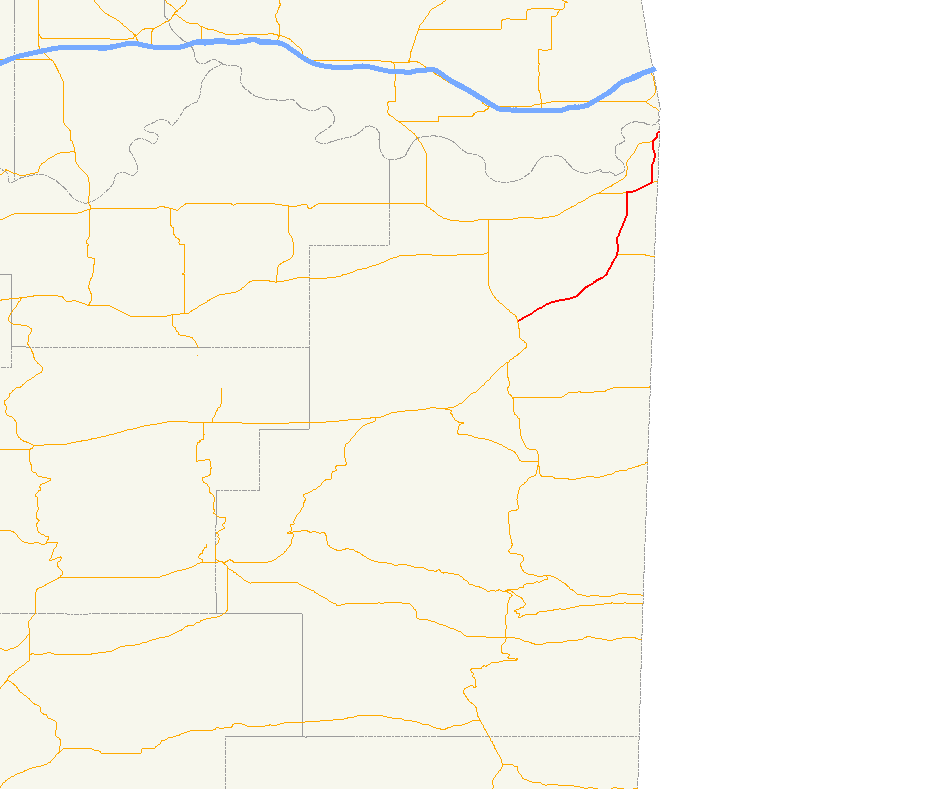

Route information
- Maintained by ODOT
- Length: 23.5 mi (37.8 km)
- Existed: Aug. 15, 1955–present

Major junctions
- South end: US 59 / US 271 in Poteau
- US 271 / SH-9 in Pocola
- North end: SH-9A in Arkoma

Location
- Country: United States
- State: Oklahoma

Highway system
- Oklahoma State Highway System; Interstate; US; State; Turnpikes
← SH-110	→ SH-113

State Highway 112 is a 24.6 mi (39.6 km) state highway in Le Flore County, Oklahoma. It connects Poteau to Arkoma. It has no lettered spur routes.

== Route description ==
SH-112 begins at an intersection with US-59/271 in Poteau, continuing the alignment of the Poteau Bypass. It continues northeast from the intersection, intersecting a railroad at-grade and crossing the Poteau River. The highway then clips the west edge of Cameron. Northeast of Cameron, the road crosses over James Fork. In Rock Island, Highway 112 serves as the western terminus of State Highway 120. At SH-120, it turns more northerly and crosses Backbone Mountain.

On the far side of the mountain, SH-112 passes through Pocola. On the north side of town, the highway intersects US-271/SH-9. SH-112 joins the concurrency, headed east. The road becomes a freeway in the run-up to Interstate 540, which begins at the Oklahoma–Arkansas state line. SH-112 exits at the last interchange in Oklahoma. From here, the highway heads north toward Arkoma, paralleling the state line.

SH-112 intersects SH-9A in Arkoma, and one of the two highways continues to the state line. Sources conflict as to which highway continues from this point, and the ultimate location of the northern terminus of SH-112. Signage present as of 2004 indicates that SH-112 continues north to end at the Arkansas state line, where no Arkansas highway exists to connect to it. However, the internal ODOT control section maps show SH-112 ending at SH-9A, and SH-9A ending at the state line. The Oklahoma state highway map distributed to the public is not detailed enough to include a label for the section of highway in question.

== History ==
State Highway 112 was added to the state highway system on August 15, 1955. Originally, the highway was paved until just south of Cameron, then continued as gravel through Cameron, ending at US-271/SH-9 in what is now Pocola (the town is not shown on contemporary maps). On October 5, 1959, the highway was straightened between Cameron and US-271. By this time, the highway was entirely paved. Further straightening between Cameron and Rock Island occurred on June 1, 1970.

The most major change in SH-112's history came on February 5, 1973, when the highway was extended to Arkoma. One further straightening occurred in the Cameron vicinity on June 27, 1982. No further changes have occurred since then.

== Junction list ==
The entire route is in Le Flore County.

Location	mi	km	Destinations	Notes
Poteau	0.0	0.0	US-59/271	Southern terminus
Rock Island	10.7	17.2	SH-120	Western terminus of SH-120
Pocola	16.9	27.2	US-271/SH-9	US-271/SH-9 join northbound and split southbound
Pocola	19.2	30.9	US-271/SH-9	US-271/SH-9 split northbound and join southbound
Arkoma	23.5	37.8	SH-9A	Possible northern terminus; possible eastern terminus of SH-9A
Arkoma	24.6	39.6	Arkansas state line	Possible northern terminus
1.000 mi = 1.609 km; 1.000 km = 0.621 mi
