= Willis Whitfield =

American physicist

- Born: December 6, 1919; Rosedale, Oklahoma
- Died: November 12, 2012; Albuquerque, New Mexico
- Education: Hardin-Simmons University (BS); George Washington University
- Known for: Invention of the modern clean room

Willis Whitfield (December 6, 1919 – November 12, 2012) was an American physicist and inventor of the modern cleanroom, a room with a low level of pollutants used in manufacturing or scientific research. His invention earned him the nickname, "Mr. Clean," from Time Magazine.

Whitfield was born in Rosedale, Oklahoma, the son of a cotton farmer. Between 1942 and 1944, he served as a ground radar crew chief in the Signal Corps, later serving in the Navy until the end of World War 2. He would graduate from Hardin-Simmons University in 1952 with a Bachelor of Science in physics and mathematics, later pursuing graduate studies at George Washington University.

An employee of the Sandia National Laboratories in New Mexico, Whitfield created the initial plans for the cleanroom in 1960. Prior to Whitfield's invention, earlier cleanrooms often had problems with particles and unpredictable airflows. Whitfield solved this problem by designing his cleanrooms with a constant, highly filtered air flow to flush out impurities in the air. Within a few years of its invention, sales of Whitfield's modern cleanroom had generated more than $50 billion in sales worldwide.

Whitfield retired from Sandia in 1984.

Whitfield died in Albuquerque, New Mexico, on November 12, 2012, at the age of 92. His death was announced by officials at Sandia National Laboratories. Two years after his death, he would be inducted into the National Inventors Hall of Fame.
