= Hardin–Simmons University =

Private university in Abilene, Texas, US

Coordinates: 32.477°N 99.734°W

- Former names: Abilene Baptist College (1891–1892); Simmons College (1892–1925); Simmons University (1925–1934)
- Motto: "...Excellence in education enlightened by Christian faith and values."
- Type: Private university
- Established: 1891; 135 years ago
- Religious affiliation: Baptist General Convention of Texas
- Endowment: $165.7 million (2020)
- President: Eric Bruntmyer
- Students: 1,765
- Undergraduates: 1,347
- Postgraduates: 418
- Location: Abilene, Texas, United States
- Campus: 209 acres (0.85 km^{2}); Urban
- Colors: Purple and Gold
- Sporting affiliations: NCAA Division III – ASC
- Mascot: Cowboy/Cowgirl
- Website: hsutx.edu
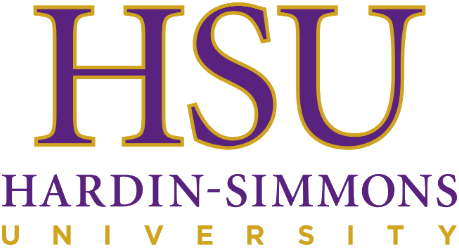

Hardin–Simmons University (HSU) is a private university in Abilene, Texas, United States. It is affiliated with the Baptist General Convention of Texas.

== History ==
Hardin–Simmons University was founded as Abilene Baptist College in 1891 by the Sweetwater Baptist Association and a group of cattlemen and pastors who sought to bring Christian higher education to the Southwest. The purpose of the school would be "to lead students to Christ, teach them of Christ, and train them for Christ." The original land was donated to the university by rancher C.W. Merchant. The school was renamed Simmons College in 1892 in honor of an early contributor, James B. Simmons. By 1907 it claimed an enrollment of 524 and a staff of 49. In 1925, it became Simmons University. It was renamed Hardin–Simmons University in 1934 in honor of Mary and John G. Hardin, who were also major contributors. The university has been associated with the Baptist General Convention of Texas since 1941.

The university publicly experienced financial challenges in the late 2010s, continuing into 2020 as the state and the Baptist General Convention of Texas reduced the funding levels of programs in which the university participates. In 2018, the university ended nine undergraduate and four graduate programs and closed five campus extensions (Logsdon Seminary campuses in Coppell, Lubbock, Corpus Christi and McAllen; Acton MBA Program in Austin). These changes also included terminations of staff and faculty. Two years later, in 2020, the university announced that it would close Logsdon Seminary and end an additional 22 academic programs with accompanying terminations of staff and faculty.

The university was granted an exception to Title IX in 2016 which allows it to legally discriminate against LGBT students for religious reasons.

=== Presidents ===
- 1892–1894: W.C. Friley
- 1894–1898: George O. Thatcher
- 1898–1901: O.C. Pope
- 1901–1902: C.R. Hairfield
- 1902–1909: Oscar Henry Cooper
- 1909–1940: Jefferson Davis Sandefer Sr.
- 1940–1940: Lucian Q. Campbell (acting president)
- 1940–1943: William R. White
- 1943–1953: Rupert N. Richardson
- 1953–1962: Evan Allard Reiff
- 1962–1963: George L. Graham (interim)
- 1963–1966: James H. Landes
- 1966–1977: Elwin L. Skiles
- 1977–1991: Jesse C. Fletcher
- 1991–2001: Lanny Hall
- 2001–2008: W. Craig Turner
- 2009–2016: Lanny Hall
- 2016–present: Eric Bruntmyer

== Academics ==
HSU offers 6 undergraduate degrees with 70 majors and 7 graduate degrees with 18 programs. Pre-professional programs include dentistry, engineering, medicine, law, pharmacology, physical therapy, and seminary. HSU offers courses in geography, Greek, Hebrew, humanities, and physical sciences, as well. The university offers a doctorate in physical therapy as well as Doctor of Education (Ed.D.).

HSU students come from diverse backgrounds and a variety of Christian denominations. With an approximate enrollment of 1,500 students, the student-to-teacher ratio was 33:1.

== Western Heritage Day ==
Western Heritage Day is an annual celebration of the American frontier since the Abilene Centennial Celebration in 1981.

== Athletics ==
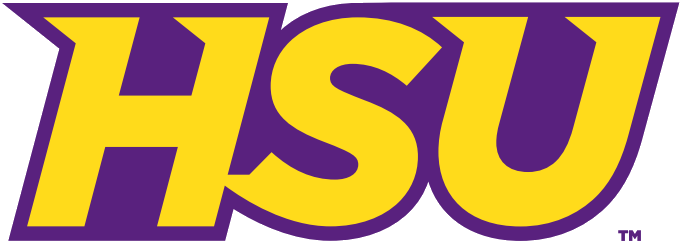
HSU athletics wordmark

The Hardin–Simmons athletic teams are the Cowboys (men's sports) and Cowgirls (women's sports). The university is a member of the Division III level of the National Collegiate Athletic Association (NCAA), primarily competing in the American Southwest Conference since the 1996–97 academic year. as of November 2016 had won 75 conference titles, the most of any school in the conference. The Cowboys/Cowgirls also competed in the Division III-based Texas Intercollegiate Athletic Association (TIAA) from 1990–91 to 1995–96.

Hardin–Simmons previously competed as a member of the Border Intercollegiate Athletic Association (BIAA; also known as the "Border Conference") from 1941–42 to 1961–62, during which time the football team won three conference championships. For the first 15 years after HSU restarted its football program (1990–2005), the Hardin–Simmons Cowboy football team had the best winning percentage (77.4%) of all Texan college football programs. Also, the men's basketball team won two Border Conference titles, in 1953 and 1957, advancing to the NCAA basketball tournament each time. The Cowboys are one of fourteen teams to have played in the tournament and no longer be in Division I; they are also one of five such teams to have appeared in more than one tournament.

Hardin–Simmons competes in 16 intercollegiate varsity sports: Men's sports include baseball, basketball, cross country, football, golf, soccer, tennis and track & field; while women's sports include basketball, cross country, golf, soccer, softball, tennis, track & field and volleyball.

=== Women's soccer ===
Hardin–Simmons women's soccer has been HSU's single-most successful athletic program with 22 ASC Conference Championships in the 1996-2019 period, and an NCAA Division III National Championship title in 2010.

== Notable alumni ==
- Naim Ateek — Palestinian theologian
- John Leland Atwood — engineer
- Owen J. Baggett — pilot
- Earl Bennett — professional football player
- Dan Blocker — actor (did not graduate)
- Doyle "Texas Dolly" Brunson — professional poker player
- Omar Burleson – politician
- Harvey Catchings — professional basketball player
- Matt Chandler – pastor
- Gene Cockrell — professional football player
- Don Collier — actor
- Roy Crane — cartoonist
- Jack Graham — pastor
- Terri Hendrix — singer-songwriter
- Stedman Graham — businessman and speaker
- Jeff Iorg — author, pastor, and teacher
- Jack T. Martin — college basketball player and coach
- W. Francis McBeth — composer
- Bob McChesney — professional football player
- Mildred Paxton Moody — journalist, preservationist, and First Lady of Texas, 1927–1931
- Dick Nagy — college basketball coach
- Fess Parker — actor
- Leighton Paige Patterson — academic administrator
- Harold Stephens — professional football player
- Clyde "Bulldog" Turner — professional football player
- Brad Underwood — college basketball coach
- Will Wagner — college football coach
- Willis Whitfield — inventor of the cleanroom
- Phil Wilson — politician
- C. V. Wood — theme park and planned community developer
- Gordon Wood — high school football coach

== Notable faculty ==
- Wayne Millner (1913–1976), American football player
- Sammy Baugh, American football player and coach
- Norma Wendelburg, composer
