= Oklahoma State Highway spurs from U.S. Highways =

State highway in Oklahoma, United States

The Oklahoma state highway system includes many state highways that act as short spur and connector routes off some of the U.S. highways that pass through the state. These highways generally bear the same number of the U.S. highway they connect to with a letter suffix.

== U.S. Highway 64 ==
- SH-64B (10 mi) connects US-64 at Muldrow to SH-101.
- SH-64D (4 mi) serves as a connector between US-64 at Moffett, Oklahoma to Interstate 40 near the Oklahoma/Arkansas state line.

== U.S. Highway 69 ==
- SH-69A There are two highways currently designated 69A
  - One (5 mi) is a spur to Sportsman Acres, Oklahoma.
  - The other is a spur which begins at U.S. 69 northeast of Commerce, Oklahoma, approximately 3/4 mile west of the southern junction of U.S. 69 and U.S. 69 Alternate. It travels south a little over 5 miles to a junction with Oklahoma State Highway 10 on the east side of Miami, Oklahoma At this junction is also an entrance/exit ramp for Interstate 44/The Will Rogers Turnpike.

== U.S. Highway 70 ==
- SH-70A (7 mi) is a spur connecting Kingston, Oklahoma to Woodville, McBride, and Lake Texoma.
- US-70A (0.9 mi) is a business route in Wilson.
- SH-70B (6 mi) connects Kingston and Lake Texoma.
- SH-70D is a spur to Devol
- SH-70E runs parallel to US-70 starting at SH-78 and traveling east, looping north to connect to its parent route near Bennington.
- SH-70F connects Madill to US-70 two miles (3 km) east of Kingston.

== U.S. Highway 77 ==
- SH-77C (0.4 mi) is an unsigned route through Purcell.
- SH-77D (2 mi) was a spur route through the Turner Falls area.
- SH-77H (9 mi) is Sooner Road through the Moore/Norman area, and ends at I-240.
- SH-77S (17 mi) connects US-70 to SH-32 near Marietta. It passes along the eastern shore of Lake Murray.

== U.S. Highway 81 ==
- SH-81A (1.94 mi) is an unsigned loop route in Duncan. The route begins at US-81, intersects SH-7, and serves as the western terminus of SH-7A before ending, again at US-81.

== U.S. Highway 183 ==
- SH-183A is a 0.8 miles (1.3 km) spur connecting US-183 to Bessie.

== U.S. Highway 259 ==
- SH-259A is a 10-mile (16 km) loop to Broken Bow Lake and Beavers Bend Resort Park north of Broken Bow, Oklahoma. It lies partially in the Ouachita National Forest and is occasionally signed as a U.S. highway.

== U.S. Highway 270 ==
- SH-270A (2 mi/3.2 km) ran from US-270 south of Seminole, Oklahoma to State Highway 9 east of the city and in effect functioned as an eastern bypass of Seminole. The SH-270A designation was removed on May 7, 2018, and was replaced by a realigned US-270.

== U.S. Highway 271 ==
- SH-271A (2 mi/3.2 km) connects US-271 south of Hugo, Oklahoma to the town of Goodland.

== U.S. Highway 281 ==
- SH-281A (1 mi/1.6 km) connects US-281 to the town of Geronimo.

== U.S. Highway 412 ==
- SH-412A is a spur from US-412 Alternate at Twin Oaks to Oaks.
- SH-412B is a 5-mile (8.0 km) spur from US-412 near Locust Grove to SH-69A near Sportsman Acres.
- SH-412P is a short spur from US-412 near Fair Oaks to Port 33 on the Verdigris River.

== See also ==
- State Highway 270
