= Oklahoma State Highway 80 =

State highway in Oklahoma, United States

State Highway 80

Route information
- Maintained by ODOT
- Length: 20.47 mi (32.94 km)

Major junctions
- south end: US 62 / SH-10 in Fort Gibson
- north end: SH-51 in Hulbert

Location
- Country: United States
- State: Oklahoma

Highway system
- Oklahoma State Highway System; Interstate; US; State; Turnpikes
← SH-79	→ US 81

State Highway 80 is a north–south state highway in eastern Oklahoma. It runs from Fort Gibson in Muskogee County to Hulbert in Cherokee County. It is 20.47 miles (32.94 km) long and has one lettered spur route, SH-80A.

== Route description ==
SH-80 begins at US-62/SH-10 just south of Fort Gibson. After heading through Fort Gibson, it enters Cherokee County. It roughly parallels the Cherokee/Wagoner County line before meeting the east end of State Highway 251A. It then heads east before curving back north and zig-zagging to its northern end with SH-51.

The route is known for its winding curves as it traverses the eastern shores of Fort Gibson Lake and is popular among motorcyclists.

== Junction list ==
County	Location	mi	km	Destinations	Notes
Muskogee	Fort Gibson	0.0	0.0	US 62 / SH-10	Southern terminus
Muskogee	Fort Gibson	1.9	3.1	SH-80A	
Muskogee	Fort Gibson	2.2	3.5	SH-80A	
Cherokee		7.0	11.3	SH-251A	
Cherokee	Hulbert	20.4	32.8	SH-51	
1.000 mi = 1.609 km; 1.000 km = 0.621 mi

== SH-80A ==

SH-80A is an alternate route of SH-80 through the east side of Fort Gibson. It is 0.85 miles (1.37 km) in length and connects to SH-80 at both ends.
