= Oklahoma State Highway 120 =

State highway in Oklahoma, United States

State Highway 120

Route information
- Maintained by ODOT
- Length: 3.04 mi (4.89 km)
- Existed: c. 1956–present

Major junctions
- West end: SH-112 in Rock Island
- East end: AR 10 at the Arkansas state line near Rock Island

Location
- Country: United States
- State: Oklahoma

Highway system
- Oklahoma State Highway System; Interstate; US; State; Turnpikes
← SH-117	→ SH-123

State Highway 120, also abbreviated as SH-120 or OK-120, is a 3.04-mile-long (4.89 km) highway in the eastern part of the state of Oklahoma, US. It connects to SH-112 at Rock Island on its western end and passes through Le Flore County to the Arkansas state line, where it becomes Highway 10 running to Little Rock.

== Route description ==
Highway 120 begins at SH-112 and heads due east. It serves the town of Rock Island. Near its midpoint, SH-120 crosses Ivy Branch. It then has a railroad crossing. The road curves to the south as it passes through an area of sandy terrain. The highway then ends at the Arkansas state line, west of Hackett, Arkansas.

== History ==
SH-112 first appears on the 1957 state highway map, implying that it was commissioned in 1956. At that time, the entire length of the highway was gravel. The road was paved in 1968. The road has always had the same general route.

== Junction list ==
County	Location	mi	km	Destinations	Notes
Le Flore	Rock Island	0.00	0.00	SH-112	Western terminus
Oklahoma–Arkansas state line		3.04	4.89	AR 10 continues east into Arkansas	
1.000 mi = 1.609 km; 1.000 km = 0.621 mi
