= Jenson Tunnel =

Jenson Railroad Tunnel
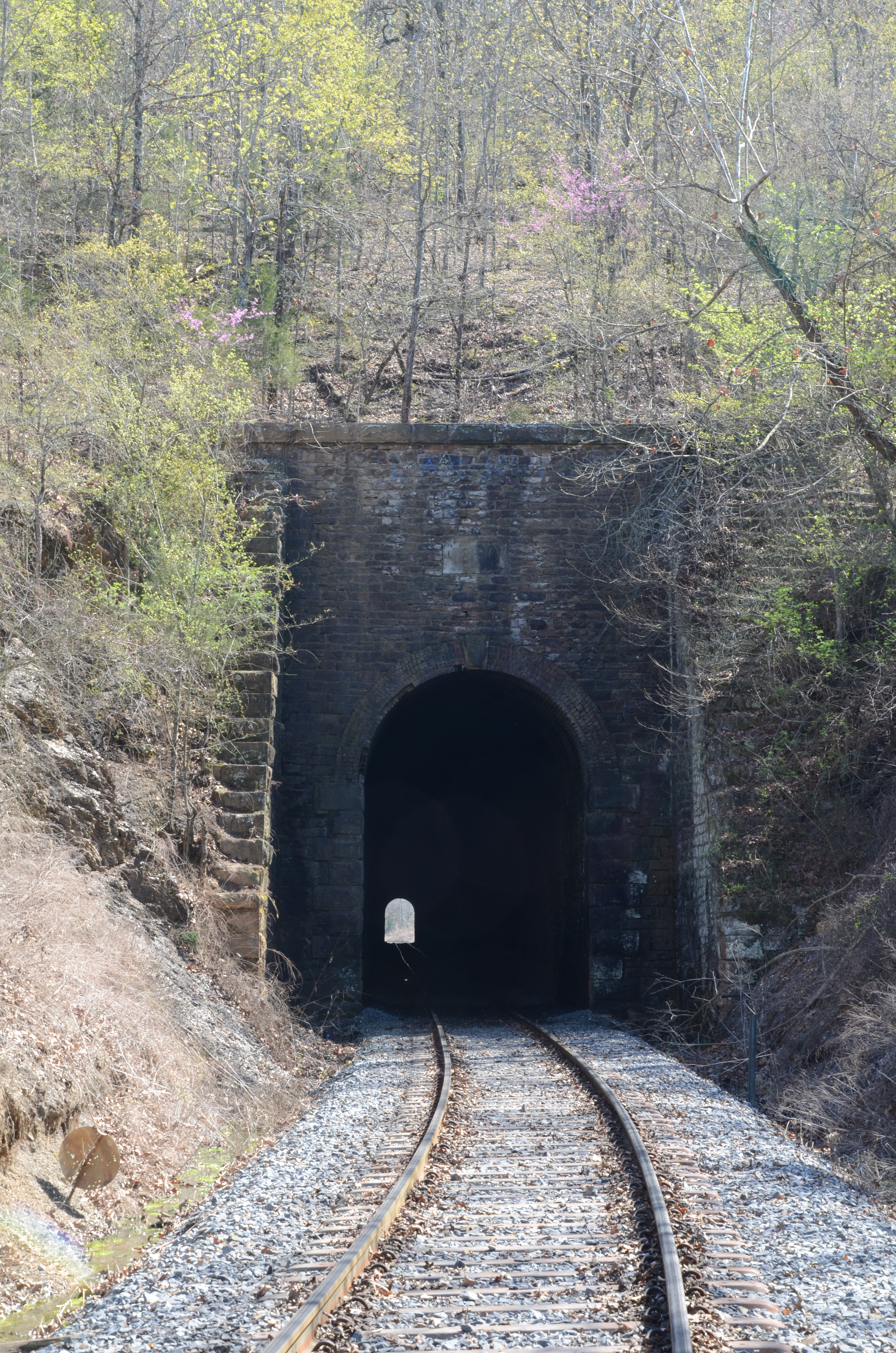
- North Entrance of Jenson Tunnel
- Interactive map of Jenson Railroad Tunnel

Overview
- Other name: KCS-Backbone Tunnel
- Location: Le Flore County, Oklahoma
- Coordinates: 35°13′3.3″N 94°26′34.4″W
- Status: Active

Operation
- Work began: 1885
- Opened: 1886

Technical
- Length: 1180
- Track gauge: Standard
- Min elevation: 600 feet
- Tunnel clearance: 20.0 ft (6.1 m)
- Width: 14.0 ft (4.3 m)

Jenson Railroad Tunnel (Note: Also called "KCS-Backbone Tunnel".) is the first and only railroad tunnel in the present state of Oklahoma. It was constructed through Backbone Mountain (Note: Backbone Mountain is a feature of the Ouachita Mountains range and is also called Devil's Backbone. The mountain extends across the state line into Sebastian County, Arkansas. The Battle of Devil's Backbone was fought on this mountain on September 1, 1863, during the American Civil War.) during 1885–86, by the Fort Smith & Southern Railway (FSSR). (Note: The St. Louis & San Francisco Railroad (also known as the "Frisco" or SLSF.) controlled the Fort Smith & Southern Railway, which was formed in 1886 and which was absorbed by the Frisco in March, 1887.) and has remained in service until the present. At the time it was built, the tunnel was located in the Choctaw Nation in Indian Territory. Since Oklahoma became a state in 1907, the tunnel site has been part of Le Flore County, Oklahoma. It is now primarily used by the Canadian Pacific Kansas City, previously the Kansas City Southern Railroad (KCS), and has sometimes been referred to as the KCS - Jenson Tunnel.

== History ==
Jenson Tunnel is located on private property northeast of Rock Island and is the only known railroad tunnel in Oklahoma. It was built by a predecessor of the St. Louis-San Francisco Railway (Frisco) in 1885–86. (Note: Stone markers above the north and south portals show a date of 1886.) The tunnel was created through Backbone Mountain in what is now Le Flore County, Oklahoma.

One blogger reported that the tunnel was built on the east side of the Arkansas-Indian Territory border, but that a subsequent realignment of the border put it entirely inside the present state of Oklahoma.

== Description ==
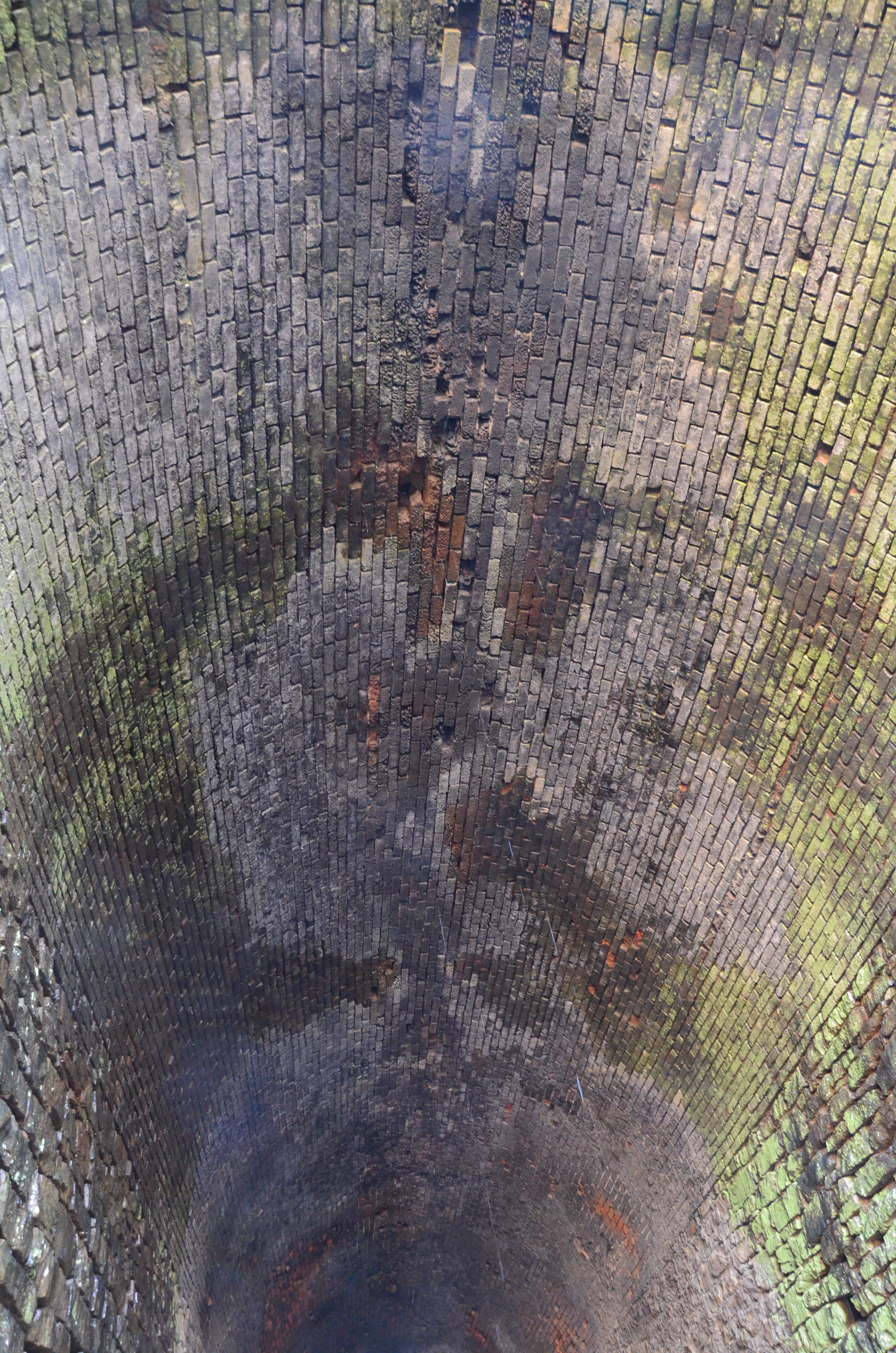
Detail of Jenson Tunnel ceiling in 2015

The tunnel is 1,180 feet (360 m) long and has a single track. The deck width is 14.0 feet (4.3 m) and the clearance above the deck is 20.0 feet (6.1 m). Its elevation is 600 feet (180 m) above mean sea level. The tunnel has various lengths of lining and arching. 624 feet (190 m) of the interior is unlined and has no arching. About 324 feet (99 m) at each end are lined with stone and have a brick arch. 62 feet (19 m). The rest of the length (118 feet (36 m)) has timber posts and arches.

== NRHP listing ==
The tunnel was listed on the National Register of Historic Places (NRHP) on May 13, 1976. Reference number is 76001567.
