= Fittstown, Oklahoma =

- Unincorporated community and Census designated place
- Location within Oklahoma Location within the United States
- Coordinates: 34°36′33″N 96°38′26″W
- Country: United States
- State: Oklahoma
- County: Pontotoc

Area
  - Total: 1.07 sq mi (2.78 km^{2})
  - Land: 1.07 sq mi (2.78 km^{2})
  - Water: 0 sq mi (0.00 km^{2})
- Elevation: 856 ft (261 m)

Population (2020)
  - Total: 78
  - Density: 72.8/sq mi (28.09/km^{2})
- Time zone: UTC-6 (Central (CST))
  - Summer (DST): UTC-5 (CDT)
- ZIP code: 74842
- Area code: 580
- GNIS feature ID: 2805317

Fittstown is an unincorporated community in Pontotoc County, Oklahoma, United States. As of the 2020 census, Fittstown had a population of 78. Fittstown is located on U.S. Route 377, 11 miles (18 km) south-southeast of Ada. Fittstown has a post office with ZIP code 74842.

== Demographics ==
Historical population
| Census | Pop. | Note | %± |
|---|---|---|---|
| 2020 | 78 | | — |
U.S. Decennial Census

=== 2020 census ===
As of the 2020 census, Fittstown had a population of 78. The median age was 29.0 years. 19.2% of residents were under the age of 18 and 14.1% of residents were 65 years of age or older. For every 100 females there were 69.6 males, and for every 100 females age 18 and over there were 57.5 males age 18 and over.

0.0% of residents lived in urban areas, while 100.0% lived in rural areas.

There were 26 households in Fittstown, of which 19.2% had children under the age of 18 living in them. Of all households, 53.8% were married-couple households, 7.7% were households with a male householder and no spouse or partner present, and 30.8% were households with a female householder and no spouse or partner present. About 38.5% of all households were made up of individuals and 19.2% had someone living alone who was 65 years of age or older.

There were 38 housing units, of which 31.6% were vacant. The homeowner vacancy rate was 20.0% and the rental vacancy rate was 0.0%.

Racial composition as of the 2020 census
| Race | Number | Percent |
|---|---|---|
| White | 53 | 67.9% |
| Black or African American | 0 | 0.0% |
| American Indian and Alaska Native | 19 | 24.4% |
| Asian | 0 | 0.0% |
| Native Hawaiian and Other Pacific Islander | 0 | 0.0% |
| Some other race | 1 | 1.3% |
| Two or more races | 5 | 6.4% |
| Hispanic or Latino (of any race) | 3 | 3.8% |

== Education ==
It is within the Stonewall Public Schools school district.
