= Logsdon Seminary =

Coordinates: 32.4751°N 99.7326°W

- Motto: Humility, Compassion, and Courage.
- Type: Private seminary
- Religious affiliation: Baptist General Convention of Texas; Cooperative Baptist Fellowship
- Academic affiliations: ATS; SACS
- Dean: Robert Ellis, PhD
- Location: Abilene, Corpus Christi, Dallas-Fort Worth, Lubbock, McAllen, and San Antonio, Texas, United States
- Website: logsdonseminary.org

Logsdon Seminary was a private Baptist seminary in Abilene, Texas associated with Hardin-Simmons University. The seminary offered the Master of Divinity degree, the Master of Arts degree, and the Doctor of Ministry degree. The seminary was unable to build an adequate endowment to sustain the low revenue that seminary tuition rates typically generate, and the university announced a plan in early 2020 to close the seminary, with an appropriate "teach out" period for affected students.

== History ==
The Logsdon School of Theology was named for Charles and Koreen Logsdon of Abilene. Mrs. Logsdon made the largest gift in the university's history to that date to establish the Logsdon School of Theology in memory of her husband. Construction for the school was completed in 1989 and it is located on the southeastern corner of Hardin-Simmons University's campus. The complex features classrooms, a distance learning and preaching facilities, and the Logsdon Chapel. In 1995, Logsdon School of Theology began offering seminary programs and by 2004 the HSU trustees officially established Logsdon Seminary.

Hardin-Simmons University had persistent operational losses dating back to the 1970s. The Board of Trustees engaged higher education consultants in 2015, and committed to make the hard changes needed to balance annual budgets. In 2018, the university ended 9 undergraduate and 4 graduate programs and closed 5 campus extensions including Logsdon Seminary campuses in Coppell, Lubbock, Corpus Christi, and McAllen, and the Acton School of Business, offering generous separation agreements to members of the staff and faculty affected. Two years later, in 2020, the university announced that it would close Logsdon Seminary and end an additional 22 academic programs with one-year notice to affected faculty, and generous notice to staff.

=== Deans of Logsdon School of Theology and Logsdon Seminary ===
- H.K. Neely, Jr., first dean (1983-1998)
- M. Vernon Davis, second dean (1998-2003)
- Thomas V. Brisco, third dean (2003-2011)
- Donald D. Williford, fourth dean (2011–2017)
- Robert R. Ellis, fifth and current dean (2018–present)

== Logsdon Chapel ==
The focal point of the school is the Logsdon Chapel. Construction for the Logsdon School of Theology began in 1988. It is located on the southeastern corner of Hardin-Simmons University's campus, just seconds from Interstate 20. The 350-seat chapel space is illuminated by a breathtaking stained-glass window at the front and at the back, l treasure: a Vissar-Rowland Opus 93 pipe organ inscribed with the words: 'Soli Deo Gloria.'

Dr. H.K. Neely, Logsdon's first dean, consulted with the Byrd Glass Company of Lubbock, Texas to design and construct the Logsdon Chapel stained-glass window. Constructed of 60 individual panels, the 30-by-41 foot wall creates a magnificent kaleidoscope of light. A magnificent piece of Christian art, the window symbolizes the purpose, mission, and vision of Logsdon School of Theology: a cross, an open Bible, and a dove. Centered in the window, the cross signifies the centrality of the living Christ. The open Bible represents the authority of the Bible as the essential and trustworthy guide for life and faith. The dove represents the Holy Spirit's presence in the global mission of the church. These elements are encircled, representing the students call to serve the world.

The Grace Katherine White Organ, named for Mrs. Katherine Logsdon White, sister of Mr. Charles Logsdon, was constructed in 1992 and likewise warrants a sense of grandiosity. The Vissar-Rowland Opus 93 pipe organ was based on a conventional North German-Dutch design.
