= Mingo, Oklahoma =

- Unincorporated Town
- Country: United States
- State: Oklahoma
- County: Tulsa

Area
  - Total: 0.54 sq mi (1.4 km^{2})
  - Land: 0.54 sq mi (1.4 km^{2})
  - Water: 0 sq mi (0.0 km^{2})
- Elevation: 597 ft (182 m)

Population (2010)
  - Total: ?
- Time zone: UTC-6 (Central (CST))
  - Summer (DST): UTC-5 (CDT)
- Area code: 918
- Reference1

Mingo is an unincorporated town in Tulsa County, Oklahoma, United States.

== Geography ==
Mingo is located at 36°13′16″N 95°52′08″W. It has a total area of 0.8 square miles, all land. Mingo is also 600 feet above sea level. Mingo is located at 46th St N and Mingo Road. It is located northeast of the Tulsa International Airport.
