= Bowlegs, Oklahoma =

- Town
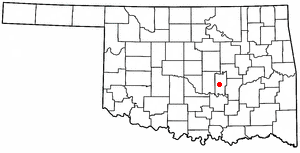
- Location of Bowlegs, Oklahoma
- Coordinates: 35°08′50″N 96°40′09″W
- Country: United States
- State: Oklahoma
- County: Seminole

Area
  - Total: 3.72 sq mi (9.64 km^{2})
  - Land: 3.72 sq mi (9.64 km^{2})
  - Water: 0 sq mi (0.00 km^{2})
- Elevation: 942 ft (287 m)

Population (2020)
  - Total: 357
  - Density: 95.9/sq mi (37.02/km^{2})
- Time zone: UTC-6 (Central (CST))
  - Summer (DST): UTC-5 (CDT)
- ZIP code: 74830
- Area code: 405
- FIPS code: 40-07950
- GNIS feature ID: 2411714

Bowlegs is a town in Seminole County, Oklahoma, United States. The population was 357 at the time of the 2020 census.

== Etymology ==
According to tradition, the community has the name of Billy Bowlegs, a leader of the Seminoles in Florida. However, other theories exist. Bowlegs has frequently been noted on lists of unusual place names.

== History ==
Bowlegs was a modest settlement before the oil boom, boasting only a gristmill and a general store. But once the first area well came in during 1926, an estimated 15,000 people lived in and around the community. Additional housing had to be built, and a brick high school was constructed in the 1928-1929 timeframe. However, the boom came and went, and by 1946 the estimated population was just 105.

== Geography ==
According to the United States Census Bureau, the town has a total area of 3.8 square miles (9.8 km^{2}), all land.

== Demographics ==
Historical population
Census	Pop.	Note	%±
1980	522		—
1990	398		−23.8%
2000	371		−6.8%
2010	405		9.2%
2020	357		−11.9%
U.S. Decennial Census

=== 2020 census ===
As of the 2020 census, Bowlegs had a population of 357. The median age was 49.1 years. 17.9% of residents were under the age of 18 and 25.5% of residents were 65 years of age or older. For every 100 females there were 89.9 males, and for every 100 females age 18 and over there were 90.3 males age 18 and over.

0.0% of residents lived in urban areas, while 100.0% lived in rural areas.

There were 146 households in Bowlegs, of which 28.8% had children under the age of 18 living in them. Of all households, 50.0% were married-couple households, 21.9% were households with a male householder and no spouse or partner present, and 24.0% were households with a female householder and no spouse or partner present. About 26.1% of all households were made up of individuals and 10.3% had someone living alone who was 65 years of age or older.

There were 165 housing units, of which 11.5% were vacant. The homeowner vacancy rate was 0.0% and the rental vacancy rate was 7.1%.

Racial composition as of the 2020 census
Race	Number	Percent
White	244	68.3%
Black or African American	2	0.6%
American Indian and Alaska Native	58	16.2%
Asian	0	0.0%
Native Hawaiian and Other Pacific Islander	1	0.3%
Some other race	1	0.3%
Two or more races	51	14.3%
Hispanic or Latino (of any race)	21	5.9%

=== 2000 census ===
As of the census of 2000, there were 371 people, 148 households, and 108 families residing in the town. The population density was 98.7 inhabitants per square mile (38.1/km^{2}). There were 167 housing units at an average density of 44.4 per square mile (17.1/km^{2}). The racial makeup of the town was 81.13% White, 0.54% African American, 15.63% Native American, 0.27% from other races, and 2.43% from two or more races. Hispanic or Latino of any race were 1.35% of the population.

There were 148 households, out of which 25.7% had children under the age of 18 living with them, 56.1% were married couples living together, 10.1% had a female householder with no husband present, and 27.0% were non-families. 23.0% of all households were made up of individuals, and 8.8% had someone living alone who was 65 years of age or older. The average household size was 2.51 and the average family size was 2.97.

In the town, the population was spread out, with 25.6% under the age of 18, 6.5% from 18 to 24, 23.5% from 25 to 44, 29.9% from 45 to 64, and 14.6% who were 65 years of age or older. The median age was 40 years. For every 100 females, there were 86.4 males. For every 100 females age 18 and over, there were 90.3 males.

The median income for a household in the town was $26,250, and the median income for a family was $28,333. Males had a median income of $22,125 versus $16,354 for females. The per capita income for the town was $12,459. About 15.5% of families and 24.0% of the population were below the poverty line, including 27.5% of those under age 18 and 36.0% of those age 65 or over.

== Education ==
It is in the Bowlegs Public Schools school district.
