= Rock Island, Oklahoma =

- Town
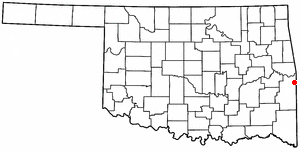
- Location of Rock Island, Oklahoma
- Coordinates: 35°10′59″N 94°28′52″W
- Country: United States
- State: Oklahoma
- County: Le Flore

Area
  - Total: 12.23 sq mi (31.68 km^{2})
  - Land: 12.17 sq mi (31.53 km^{2})
  - Water: 0.062 sq mi (0.16 km^{2})
- Elevation: 502 ft (153 m)

Population (2020)
  - Total: 717
  - Density: 58.9/sq mi (22.74/km^{2})
- Time zone: UTC-6 (Central (CST))
  - Summer (DST): UTC-5 (CDT)
- FIPS code: 40-63600
- GNIS feature ID: 2412560

Rock Island is a town in Le Flore County, Oklahoma, United States. As of the 2020 census, Rock Island had a population of 717.

== History ==
The Fort Smith and Southern Railway built a north–south line through what is now Le Flore County in 1886; the line was sold the next year to the St. Louis and San Francisco Railroad ("the Frisco"). In 1903–04 the Midland Valley Railroad laid an east-west line. The settlement originally known as Maney Junction developed at the crossing of these railroads.

A post office was established as Rock Island, Indian Territory on February 1, 1905. It was presumably named for Rock Island, Illinois. At the time of its founding, the community was located in Skullyville County, part of the Moshulatubbee District of the Choctaw Nation.

Rock Island started the process of incorporation in 1989, but the County Commissioners did not approve the incorporation until 2004.

== Geography ==
Rock Island is 13 miles (21 km) northeast of Poteau.

The town sits on Oklahoma State Highway 112 at the western terminus of Oklahoma State Highway 120.

According to the United States Census Bureau, the town has a total area of 12.2 square miles (32 km^{2}), of which 12.1 square miles (31 km^{2}) is land and 0.1 square miles (0.26 km^{2}) (0.66%) is water.

== Economy ==
Rock Island's economy has depended on agriculture since its founding. Many residents now commute to work in nearby towns such as Poteau and Fort Smith.

== Railroad tunnel ==
Jenson Tunnel is located just northeast of Rock Island and is the only known railroad tunnel in Oklahoma. Now used by the Canadian Pacific Kansas City, it was built by Frisco Railway in 1885 and is approximately 1,180 feet long.

== Demographics ==
Historical population
Census	Pop.	Note	%±
1990	478		—
2000	709		48.3%
2010	646		−8.9%
2020	717		11.0%
U.S. Decennial Census

=== 2020 census ===
As of the 2020 census, Rock Island had a population of 717. The median age was 44.4 years. 21.6% of residents were under the age of 18 and 19.8% of residents were 65 years of age or older. For every 100 females there were 99.2 males, and for every 100 females age 18 and over there were 95.8 males age 18 and over.

0.0% of residents lived in urban areas, while 100.0% lived in rural areas.

There were 272 households in Rock Island, of which 29.0% had children under the age of 18 living in them. Of all households, 57.0% were married-couple households, 18.4% were households with a male householder and no spouse or partner present, and 21.3% were households with a female householder and no spouse or partner present. About 19.5% of all households were made up of individuals and 10.7% had someone living alone who was 65 years of age or older.

There were 308 housing units, of which 11.7% were vacant. The homeowner vacancy rate was 0.0% and the rental vacancy rate was 10.4%.

Racial composition as of the 2020 census
Race	Number	Percent
White	595	83.0%
Black or African American	4	0.6%
American Indian and Alaska Native	51	7.1%
Asian	3	0.4%
Native Hawaiian and Other Pacific Islander	0	0.0%
Some other race	8	1.1%
Two or more races	56	7.8%
Hispanic or Latino (of any race)	18	2.5%

=== 2000 census ===
As of the census of 2000, there were 709 people, 264 households, and 213 families residing in the town. The population density was 58.6 inhabitants per square mile (22.6/km^{2}). There were 279 housing units at an average density of 23.1 per square mile (8.9/km^{2}). The racial makeup of the town was 87.73% White, 5.64% Native American, 0.14% Asian, 0.56% from other races, and 5.92% from two or more races. Hispanic or Latino of any race were 1.97% of the population.

There were 264 households, out of which 40.2% had children under the age of 18 living with them, 67.0% were married couples living together, 7.6% had a female householder with no husband present, and 19.3% were non-families. 16.3% of all households were made up of individuals, and 7.2% had someone living alone who was 65 years of age or older. The average household size was 2.69 and the average family size was 3.02.

In the town, the population was spread out, with 29.1% under the age of 18, 8.6% from 18 to 24, 28.2% from 25 to 44, 25.4% from 45 to 64, and 8.7% who were 65 years of age or older. The median age was 36 years. For every 100 females, there were 115.5 males. For every 100 females age 18 and over, there were 107.0 males.

The median income for a household in the town was $30,625, and the median income for a family was $34,545. Males had a median income of $26,442 versus $18,625 for females. The per capita income for the town was $14,115. About 8.9% of families and 11.5% of the population were below the poverty line, including 11.6% of those under age 18 and 11.4% of those age 65 or over.
