= Sportsmen Acres Community, Oklahoma =

- Unincorporated community & Former Census-designated place (CDP)
- Location within the state of Oklahoma
- Coordinates: 36°14′10″N 95°16′23″W
- Country: United States
- State: Oklahoma
- County: Mayes

Area
  - Total: 1.7 sq mi (4.5 km^{2})
  - Land: 1.7 sq mi (4.5 km^{2})
  - Water: 0.039 sq mi (0.1 km^{2})

Population (2000)
  - Total: 0
  - Density: 0/sq mi (0/km^{2})
- Time zone: UTC-6 (Central (CST))
  - Summer (DST): UTC-5 (CDT)
- FIPS code: 40-69412

Sportsmen Acres Community is an unincorporated community and former census-designated place (CDP) in Mayes County, Oklahoma, United States. The population was 0 on the 2000 census; its population was not recorded for the 2010 census.

== Geography ==
According to the United States Census Bureau, the CDP has a total area of 1.8 square miles (4.5 km^{2}), of which 1.7 square miles (4.5 km^{2}) is land and 0.04 square mile (0.1 km^{2}) is water. The total area is 1.71% water. The CDP is located at 36.24573 N, 95.25118 W.

== Demographics ==
As of the 2000 Census, there were 0 people living in the CDP.
