= Criner, Oklahoma =

- Unincorporated community
- Location within Oklahoma Location within the United States
- Coordinates: 34°58′17″N 97°33′52″W
- Country: United States
- State: Oklahoma
- County: McClain
- Elevation: 1,102 ft (336 m)
- Time zone: UTC-6 (Central (CST))
  - Summer (DST): UTC-5 (CDT)
- ZIP codes: 73052 (Lindsay); 73080 (Purcell)
- GNIS feature ID: 1091821

Criner is an unincorporated community in McClain County, Oklahoma, United States. It is located on State Highway 59.

Criner is named after nearby Criner Creek, which in turn was named after the rancher George A. Criner.
