= Macomb, Oklahoma =

- Town
- Nickname: "Queen City of South Pottawatomie County"
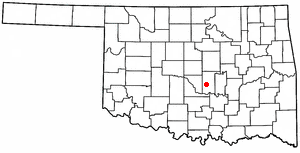
- Location of Macomb, Oklahoma
- Coordinates: 35°08′52″N 97°00′31″W
- Country: United States
- State: Oklahoma
- County: Pottawatomie

Area
  - Total: 0.089 sq mi (0.23 km^{2})
  - Land: 0.089 sq mi (0.23 km^{2})
  - Water: 0 sq mi (0.00 km^{2})
- Elevation: 991 ft (302 m)

Population (2020)
  - Total: 22
  - Density: 246.3/sq mi (95.09/km^{2})
- Time zone: UTC-6 (Central (CST))
  - Summer (DST): UTC-5 (CDT)
- ZIP code: 74852
- Area codes: 405/572
- FIPS code: 40-45500
- GNIS feature ID: 2412932

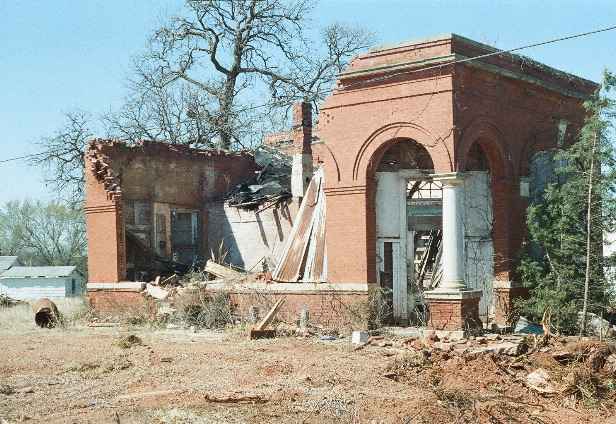
The historic U.S. Post Office building in downtown Macomb.

Macomb is a town in Pottawatomie County, Oklahoma, United States. As of the 2020 census, Macomb had a population of 22.

== History ==
The present town of Macomb began as a community named Burnett on the land allotment owned by on State Highway 59B when the Atchison, Topeka and Santa Fe Railway Burnett, entrepreneurs from Burnett, moved to the current site. A post office, originally designated as McComb, opened at the new site on May 29, 1903. The post office and the town had been named for a Santa Fe engineer named Macomb. The names of the town and post office were changed to Macomb on July 16, 1915, to correct the spelling.

By the end of 1904, the town newspaper, McComb Herald, claimed the population was 350 and coined the nickname, "Queen City of South Pottawatomie County." The 1910 census reported a population of only 166. The 1920 census showed 281 residents. Hard times came when a prolonged drought caused the cotton crops to fail. In 1930, there were only 197 inhabitants. People moved away from the area; the 1950 census reported 123 residents. The number fell to 61 by the 2000 census.

== Geography ==
Macomb is 10 miles (16 km) southwest of Tecumseh on State Highway 59B.

According to the United States Census Bureau, the town has a total area of 0.1 square miles (0.26 km^{2}), all land.

== Demographics ==
Historical population
Census	Pop.	Note	%±
1910	166		—
1920	281		69.3%
1930	197		−29.9%
1940	201		2.0%
1950	123		−38.8%
1960	76		−38.2%
1970	41		−46.1%
1980	58		41.5%
1990	64		10.3%
2000	61		−4.7%
2010	32		−47.5%
2020	22		−31.2%
U.S. Decennial Census

=== 2020 census ===
As of the 2020 census, Macomb had a population of 22. The median age was 49.5 years. 22.7% of residents were under the age of 18 and 9.1% of residents were 65 years of age or older. For every 100 females there were 100.0 males, and for every 100 females age 18 and over there were 54.5 males age 18 and over.

0.0% of residents lived in urban areas, while 100.0% lived in rural areas.

There were 7 households in Macomb, of which 85.7% had children under the age of 18 living in them. Of all households, 57.1% were married-couple households, 14.3% were households with a male householder and no spouse or partner present, and 14.3% were households with a female householder and no spouse or partner present. About 14.3% of all households were made up of individuals and 0.0% had someone living alone who was 65 years of age or older.

There were 7 housing units, of which 0.0% were vacant. The homeowner vacancy rate was 0.0% and the rental vacancy rate was 0.0%.

Racial composition as of the 2020 census
Race	Number	Percent
White	8	36.4%
Black or African American	5	22.7%
American Indian and Alaska Native	2	9.1%
Asian	0	0.0%
Native Hawaiian and Other Pacific Islander	0	0.0%
Some other race	1	4.5%
Two or more races	6	27.3%
Hispanic or Latino (of any race)	1	4.5%

=== 2000 census ===
As of the census of 2000, there were 61 people, 26 households, and 20 families residing in the town. The population density was 610 people per square mile. There were 26 housing units at an average density of 294.3 per square mile (113.6/km^{2}). The racial makeup of the town was 85.2% White, 1.6% African American, 9.8% from other races, and 3.3% from two or more races. Hispanic or Latino of any race were 9.8% of the population.

There were 20 households, out of which 45.0% had children under the age of 18 living with them, 50.0% were married couples living together, 20.0% had a female householder with no husband present, and 15.0% were non-families. 10.0% of all households were made up of individuals, and 5.0% had someone living alone who was 65 years of age or older. The average household size was 3.05 and the average family size was 3.18.

In the town, the population was spread out, with 31.1% under the age of 18, 4.9% from 18 to 24, 27.9% from 25 to 44, 24.6% from 45 to 64, and 11.5% who were 65 years of age or older. The median age was 31 years. For every 100 females, there were 125.9 males. For every 100 females age 18 and over, there were 121.1 males.

The median income for a household in the town was $30,735, and the median income for a family was $34,583. Males had a median income of $25,000 versus $18,125 for females. The per capita income for the town was $15,006. There were 9.2% of families and 12.4% of the population living below the poverty line, including 37.5% of under eighteens and none of those over 64.

== Education ==
Macomb is in the Macomb Public Schools school district.
