= Byars, Oklahoma =

- Town
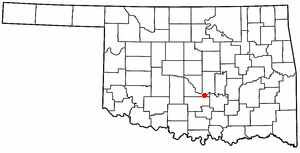
- Location in Oklahoma
- Coordinates: 34°52′22″N 97°03′10″W
- Country: United States
- State: Oklahoma
- County: McClain

Area
  - Total: 1.64 sq mi (4.24 km^{2})
  - Land: 1.53 sq mi (3.97 km^{2})
  - Water: 0.11 sq mi (0.28 km^{2})
- Elevation: 1,027 ft (313 m)

Population (2020)
  - Total: 184
  - Density: 120.1/sq mi (46.37/km^{2})
- Time zone: UTC-6 (Central (CST))
  - Summer (DST): UTC-5 (CDT)
- ZIP Code: 74831
- Area code: 405
- FIPS code: 40-10550
- GNIS feature ID: 2413142

Byars is a town in McClain County, Oklahoma, United States. The population was 184 at the 2020 census, down from 255 in 2010.

== History ==
The present community of Byars is one mile southeast of the Camp Arbuckle site in what is now McClain County. Before Byars was established, there was a community called "Johnsonville", named for local rancher Montford Johnson. Thomas B. Johnson, Chief Justice of the Chickasaw Nation, lived in Johnsonville, and his daughter Katie married Nathan H. Byars, another local rancher.

In 1903, the Oklahoma Central Railroad (OCR) was very interested in building a community one mile south of Johnsonville, where the OCR was building an east–west line. Katie Byars and her husband donated land to be used for this purpose, despite opposition from their neighbors in Johnsonville. A post office named Byars was opened on April 9, 1903. Byars incorporated in 1906, and the OCR main line reached the town site in July 1908. At statehood in 1907, Byars had an official population of 537.

== Geography ==
Byars is in the southeast corner of McClain County, along State Highway 59. Purcell, the McClain county seat, is 25 miles (40 km) to the northwest, and Ada is 24 miles (39 km) to the southeast.

According to the U.S. Census Bureau, Byars has a total area of 1.6 square miles (4.1 km^{2}), of which 1.5 square miles (3.9 km^{2}) are land and 0.1 square miles (0.26 km^{2}), or 6.53%, are water.

== Demographics ==
Historical population
Census	Pop.	Note	%±
1910	487		—
1920	629		29.2%
1930	502		−20.2%
1940	466		−7.2%
1950	284		−39.1%
1960	256		−9.9%
1970	247		−3.5%
1980	353		42.9%
1990	263		−25.5%
2000	280		6.5%
2010	255		−8.9%
2020	184		−27.8%
U.S. Decennial Census

=== 2020 census ===
As of the 2020 census, Byars had a population of 184. The median age was 41.3 years. 25.5% of residents were under the age of 18 and 14.1% of residents were 65 years of age or older. For every 100 females there were 91.7 males, and for every 100 females age 18 and over there were 80.3 males age 18 and over.

0.0% of residents lived in urban areas, while 100.0% lived in rural areas.

There were 74 households in Byars, of which 35.1% had children under the age of 18 living in them. Of all households, 52.7% were married-couple households, 9.5% were households with a male householder and no spouse or partner present, and 29.7% were households with a female householder and no spouse or partner present. About 23.0% of all households were made up of individuals and 8.1% had someone living alone who was 65 years of age or older.

There were 95 housing units, of which 22.1% were vacant. The homeowner vacancy rate was 1.7% and the rental vacancy rate was 13.0%.

Racial composition as of the 2020 census
Race	Number	Percent
White	148	80.4%
Black or African American	0	0.0%
American Indian and Alaska Native	13	7.1%
Asian	0	0.0%
Native Hawaiian and Other Pacific Islander	0	0.0%
Some other race	2	1.1%
Two or more races	21	11.4%
Hispanic or Latino (of any race)	9	4.9%

=== 2000 census ===
As of the census of 2000, there were 280 people, 105 households, and 74 families residing in the town. The population density was 182.0 inhabitants per square mile (70.3/km^{2}). There were 118 housing units at an average density of 76.7 per square mile (29.6/km^{2}). The racial makeup of the town was 86.79% White, 10.36% Native American, 0.36% Asian, 0.36% from other races, and 2.14% from two or more races. Hispanic or Latino of any race were 1.79% of the population.

There were 105 households, out of which 35.2% had children under the age of 18 living with them, 52.4% were married couples living together, 12.4% had a female householder with no husband present, and 29.5% were non-families. 24.8% of all households were made up of individuals, and 15.2% had someone living alone who was 65 years of age or older. The average household size was 2.67 and the average family size was 3.16.

In the town, the population was spread out, with 29.3% under the age of 18, 8.2% from 18 to 24, 30.0% from 25 to 44, 16.8% from 45 to 64, and 15.7% who were 65 years of age or older. The median age was 35 years. For every 100 females, there were 87.9 males. For every 100 females age 18 and over, there were 94.1 males.

The median income for a household in the town was $20,357, and the median income for a family was $25,417. Males had a median income of $27,188 versus $20,179 for females. The per capita income for the town was $18,647. About 21.3% of families and 23.6% of the population were below the poverty line, including 31.7% of those under the age of 18 and 10.4% of those 65 or over.

== Education ==
It is in the Wayne Public Schools school district.
