= Early Ceramic Period (Kansas) =

The Early Ceramic period (1 BCE to 1,000 CE) marked the end of the Archaic period for this part of the world. You can assume that, by the name, the ceramic period marks the beginning of the creation of ceramics and while this is true, it was the beginning of even more technology. The end of the Archaic period saw the spread of the cultivation of local plants and the Ceramic period saw agricultural expansion. Alterations in weaponry began and the ways in which people hunted started to change. Emphasis on ceremonial burials and a new way to bury and celebrate the dead comes about.

== Social ==
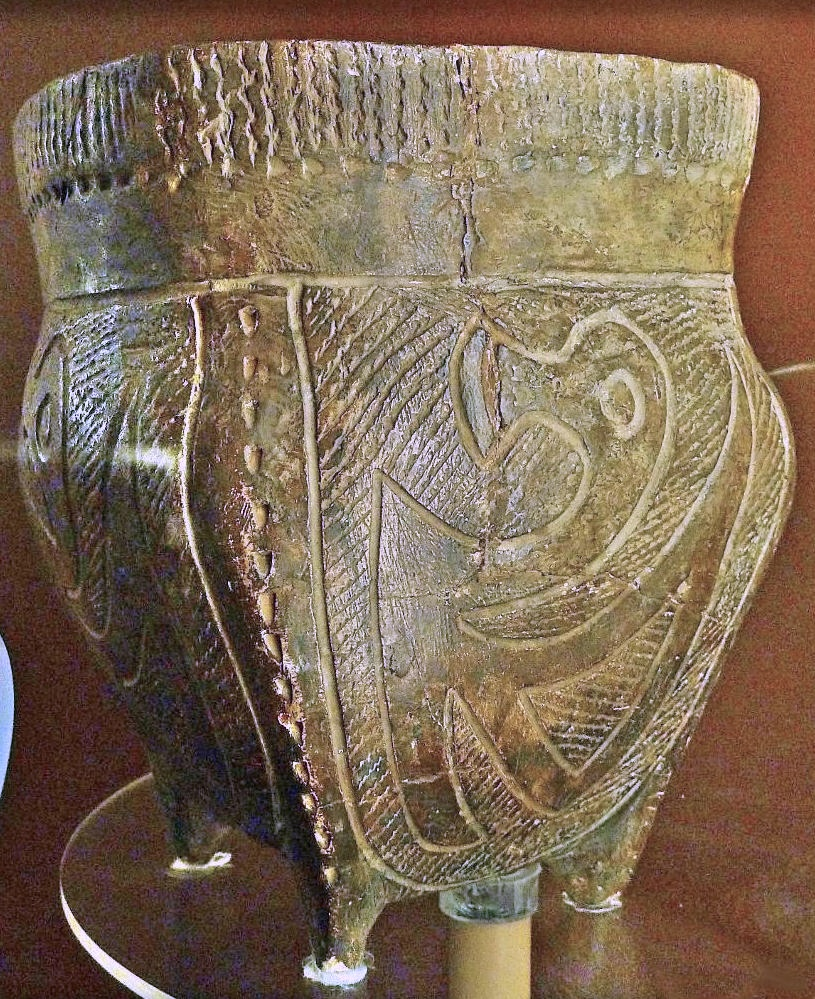
Hopewell Pottery

Toward the beginning of the Ceramic Period, camps were scattered around the land near water sources but as population increased and tensions started to rise, more families came closer to create sedentary villages around or near springs, ponds, and streams. One of the groups of people known to have migrated toward Kansas was the Hopewell people. The Hopewell people seem to have migrated along the Missouri river and are believed to be a main influence on the many changes of the Early Ceramic period in the Great Plains.

== Hopewell People ==
The Hopewell people got their name from a landowner named Mordecai Hopewell who had mounds on his property excavated in the 1800s. The mounds constructed by the Hopewell people were strictly ceremonial or used for burials. Some burials were suggestive of a hierarchically structured society because of the goods they contained. Their settlements of rectangular houses were most prominent in Northeastern America. They had a long-distance trade network that extended down to the Gulf of Mexico and through to the Rocky Mountains obtaining goods such as copper, mica, shells, and obsidian that they used to make tools and weapons. The Hopewell people gathered wild plants but also raised crops such as sunflowers, goosefoot, and squash.

== Transformation ==
As stated above, the most notable change going into the Ceramic Period was the boom in creation of ceramic vessels. The creation of pottery is very widespread. The styles of these ceramic pieces show resemblance to what was created by the Hopewell people, showing influence due to trade and the migration of these people towards Kansas. Pottery was used for cooking and storage and some of it was decorated. More notable was cord marked pottery that was another influence from people further east. Another technological transformation during this time was the shift from the atlatl to the bow and arrow as the projectile points are being made smaller. Further examples of Hopewell influence is the use of ceremonial burial mounds and the cultivation of the same crops listed above, sunflowers, marshelder, and goosefoot though Kansas' most staple crops became corn and beans.

== See also ==
- Middle Ceramic Period
