= Middle Ceramic Period =

Period in American Indian history, 1000–1500

The Middle Ceramic Period (1000 CE-1500 CE) is a period in history during which many technological advancements occurred throughout the Midwest in areas that are within the current states of Iowa, Nebraska, Kansas, Oklahoma, and Texas. In Kansas specifically however, there is indication that the Native American Population increased during the Middle Ceramic Period and the settlements became bigger and more permanent compared to the Early Ceramic Period. A lot of these settlements would've included a variety of domestic structures, cache pits, middens, and burials. All of these aspects indicate permanent settlement. Most of these aspects can be seen in northern Kansas in the area that is known as the Glen Elder Locality, and can also be seen in southern Kansas in areas known as the Odessa Phase, the Pratt Complex, and the Bluff Creek Complex. It should also be noted that rectangular earthlodges were more common in northern Kansas, while in southern Kansas, more commonly houses were thatched with bundles of prairie grass, and then plastered using clay. Most of the individuals living in the areas of Kansas during the Middle Ceramic Period would've relied on a dual economy based on the hunting of bison and on agricultural products such as corn, beans, and squash. Wild foods collected by hunting and gathering would've also been done during this period for subsistence as well. The bow and arrow for hunting was used during this period, and improvements in pottery-making, or ceramic-making, were present in this period as well. This can be seen in northern Kansas with evidence of ceramics, and in southern Kansas this can be seen with evidence of ceramics and a variety of other tools. The Middle Ceramic Period also takes place between the Early Ceramic Period (1 CE-1000 CE), and the Late Ceramic Period (1500 CE-1800 CE).

== North Kansas ==
The only well known, extensively investigated site known in northern Kansas for the Middle Ceramic Period is the Glen Elder Locality. This site provides a variety of information on settlement aspects and on ceramics that were present during the Middle Ceramic Period.

In the Glen Elder Locality, there are a total of sixteen houses. Observation of these houses showed that there are six distinct styles among them, and for the most part are spatially segregated. The first style is square with four center posts and few wall posts, and two of the houses within the Glen Elder Locality show this style. The second style is also square, but unlike the first style, there is no evidence of a pattern of four center posts. Instead, this style has many small posts that might have supported the roofs of the houses in question. This style also lacks many internal caches but has large numbers of wall posts, and there are two houses within the Glen Elder Locality that show this style. The third style was present in five houses within the Glen Elder Locality and this style is rectangular with numerous wall posts and internal caches, fireplaces, and no clear pattern of central support posts. The fourth style there is only one of and it did not look like any of the others. The fifth style had a trapezoidal appearance and there was a few of these houses, and the six style was one large square house. Other styles of houses may be present, but not observed yet. Radiocarbon dating showed that none of the styles of houses significantly differed in age despite the variety of differences between them, and there was also no proof of regularity between the houses as there are almost no structural patterns present.

Within the settlements in the Glen Elder Locality, there are a wide variety of ceramics. The ceramics from this site have clear spatial patterning, but there are differences in the attributes of the ceramics in that for the most part these attributes are not shown in traditional ceramic classifications. There are a variety of differences in the ceramics, the differences being features such as rim height, angle of rim flare, and precise location of decorative elements. Radiocarbon dating showed no discernable differences in age to provide an explanation for the variety of differences in the ceramics, so another conclusion was made that the varietal differences in the ceramics were the result of separate dispersed communities.

== South Kansas ==
There is a significantly larger database for southern Kansas than there is for northern Kansas. In southern Kansas there is currently three extensively investigated sites, and these sites are the Odessa Phase, the Pratt Complex, and the Bluff Creek Complex. Each of these sites provides a variety of information on settlement aspects, subsistence, and materials that were present during the Middle Ceramic Period. Although half of the Odessa Phase is located in northwest Oklahoma and the Texas panhandle, while the other half is located in southern Kansas, the settlement aspects, subsistence, and materials seem to be the same across the entire Odessa Phase.

=== The Odessa Phase ===
In the Odessa Phase, the primary house forms present are oval-to-circular subterranean pit structure. One house that is probably typical across the phase contains to large central posts with smaller posts closely spaced around the perimeter, and there was a hearth along a pit wall. Also seen is that the houses would've had a sloped or stepped entry. A second type of house was also found that would've made up a large number of the houses across the phase. These houses are circular, have a hearth within them that is off center, a center post, and in some cases, posts along the perimeter. Following abandonment, the houses within the Odessa Phase were typically backfilled with trash. Large square surface structures outlined in stone were also found at a site within the Odessa Phase, and throughout the Odessa Phase a large number of subterranean storage facilities were also found in habitual sites. For burials, burial practices are not well understood, but there are burials sites that include both single and multiple internments. Sometimes the burials were capped by rock-covered cairns, and burial of the dead within house structures was not a common practice found in the Odessa Phase. There was evidence of it in a couple houses, but this appears to be the reuse of Middle Ceramic houses by later occupants. Overall, compared to the size of the entire Odessa Phase, burials are rare, leading to a theory that possibly excarnation was done. Several burials contained evidence of warfare, but this was poorly documented. Also found was a variety of grave goods throughout the burials, and these include mussel shells, elbow pipes of Kansas pipestone, caches of Alibates flakes, large bifaces, Olivella shell beads, celts produced from nonlocal materials, cord-marked ceramics, bone awls, tibia digging sticks, conch and abalone shell ornaments, and turquoise beads and pendants.

Evidence on a strong horticulture dependence in the Odessa Phase was present, as there is a large abundance of domestic plant evidence found within the Odessa Phase. These domestic plants include corn, beans, squash, marsh elder, and sunflower. Evidence of wild plant consumption and utilization was also shown, and these included sunflower, purslane, goosefoot, sand plums, knotweed, marsh elder, bulrush, and carpetweed. Presence of bison consumption is also shown, as well as other faunal species.

In the Odessa Phase, there is evidence of bone tools, which are all bison, and are scapula hoes, tibia digging sticks, and bone awls. For stone tools, there was beveled knives, triangular projectile points, endscrapers, drills, and abrading stones. For ceramics, they were typically globular and cord-marked, with vertical to flaring rims that were frequently decorated. The decorations usually covered more than fifty percent of the rim, and were decorated with a variety of techniques, but the most common were finger-pinching, impressing, and parallel impressed lines along the neck and rim. Present in a few of the ceramics was lip tabs and handles, smoothed cord marking, and corncob impressions. Tempers in all the ceramics are typically sand, but also consist of bone, crushed stone, grog, and grit.

=== The Pratt Complex ===
There is currently little information on architecture and other features within the Pratt Complex. There is however, one complete structure and several partial surface structures. The complete house has slightly flattened sides and rounded, braced corners. There was also basin-shaped hearths that were in the center of the structures. There were also similarly shaped hearths present outside of the structures, as well as one shallow ovoid basin containing a post near the center, which indicates that subsurface structures could've also been present. Some trash-filled storage pits outside the structures were also found and excavated. For burials, there is very little information, as there is only one instance of a burial practice being shown. This one instance is of a child that was discovered in a flexed position on the floor of a pit that was exposed in the trench of a silo wall. There were ceramics collected near the child, as well as a Kansas pipestone pipe fragment and some faunal material. A skull and a portion of a femur were also present, however little information of how it got there is present, only that it was a recovered from an apparently disturbed context.

For subsistence in the Pratt Complex, remains of bison was the most common element found, however deer, avifauna, turtle, fish, and other small mammals were occasionally found. There was evidence of marrow extraction and bone grease reduction from the bison, and charred pits were also found. For horticulture, evidence of corn was present.

In the Pratt Complex, there is evidence of a large amount of bone tools, which are all bison, besides some awls formed from deer pronghorns. These bone tools are tibia digging stick tips, scapula hoes, awls formed from rib edges and long bone shaft fragments, and beads as well as finely pointed needles. For stone tools, there were arrowpoints, beveled knives, endscrapers, and flake drills. Groundstone inventory included arrow shaft abraders and hammerstones, and domestic processing equipment was also present which consisted of manos, metates, and mauls. For the ceramics, they were typically cord-marked and partially smoothed on the impressions. The typical ceramic consisted of globular jars of a moderate size, with slightly out-flaring rims, had no handles or lugs except for rare instances, and decorations were generally confined to the lip of the ceramic. Sand-tempered ceramics dominated the sites within the Pratt Complex, however there was also evidence of bone-tempered use and calcium-carbonated tempered use, as well as evidence of untempered ceramics and plain wares. Evidence of exotic materials were also present, these materials consisting of obsidian, turquoise beads and fragments, Olivella shell beads, and other marine shell ornaments. The evidence suggests that the materials only arrived occasionally, and that the Pratt Complex populations were not heavily involved in the regional exchange of exotic materials.

=== The Bluff Creek Complex ===
Typical features associated with the Bluff Creek Complex include surface structures of ovoid and subrectangular forms, and when found in prairie settings houses have been identified as low mounds. Pole frameworks with interior supports and possible partitions were also found within the houses, but hearths were not. Other pole structures were found near the houses may indicate domestic work areas such as drying racks and scaffolds. There were also shallow oval-shaped basins and cylindrical storage pits present. For burials, there is a medium amount of information present for burial practices. There was a largely complete burial of an individual found, a cranium found with three hundred beads, largely complete remains of a third individual while road construction was being done from a storage pit, and partial sets of remains found in storage pits also while road construction was being done. Also found was a child with twenty five marine shell beads, an individual with a piece of red ochre and ceramic sherds, and cranial fragments of at least two individuals in a trash-filled basin.

For subsistence in the Bluff Creek Complex, bison remains was the main element found, however deer, pronghorn, canid, raccoon, skunk, squirrel, cotton-tail, jackrabbit, prairie dog, and box and pond turtle were also found. Found as well were avifauna and fish, and for horticulture, charred maize was present.

In the Bluff Creek Complex, there is evidence of bone tools, which are bison scapula hoes and tibia digging stick tips. For stone tools, there was arrowpoints, small endscrapers, beveled knives, and flake drills. For ceramics, there is a variety of attributes and types, most likely representing the evidence of trade. The typical ceramic type was cord-marked ceramics with zigzag lines on the rim necks, punctates, finger-pinching, and oblique-incised lines on the lips. On ceramics without cord-marking, shell-tempered wares with nodes and strips are common and appear to represent something beyond what the locals traditionally did. Strap handles were also present with similar decoration applied.

== Bibliography ==
- Banks, William E., and Hoard, Robert J. (2006). "Introduction". In Hoard, Robert J. and Banks, William E. (eds.) Kansas Archaeology. University Press of Kansas. p. 8.
- Bevitt, C. Tod, and Brosowske, Scott D. (2006). "Looking South: The Middle Ceramic Period in Southern Kansas and Beyond". In Hoard, Robert J. and Banks, William E. (eds.) Kansas Archaeology. University Press of Kansas. pp. 180–205.
- Blakeslee, Donald J. (2005). "Middle Ceramic Period Earthlodges as the Products of Craft Traditions". In Pauls, Elizabeth P. and Roper, Donna C. (eds.) Plains Earthlodges: Ethnographic and Archaeological Perspectives. The University of Alabama Press. pp. 83–110.
- "Kansas Archeology - Middle Ceramic - Kansapedia - Kansas Historical Society". www.kshs.org. Retrieved 2023-11-19.
- "Kansas Archeology - Kansapedia - Kansas Historical Society". www.kshs.org. Retrieved 2023-12-10.
