= Oklahoma State Highway 33 =

Highway in Oklahoma

State Highway 33

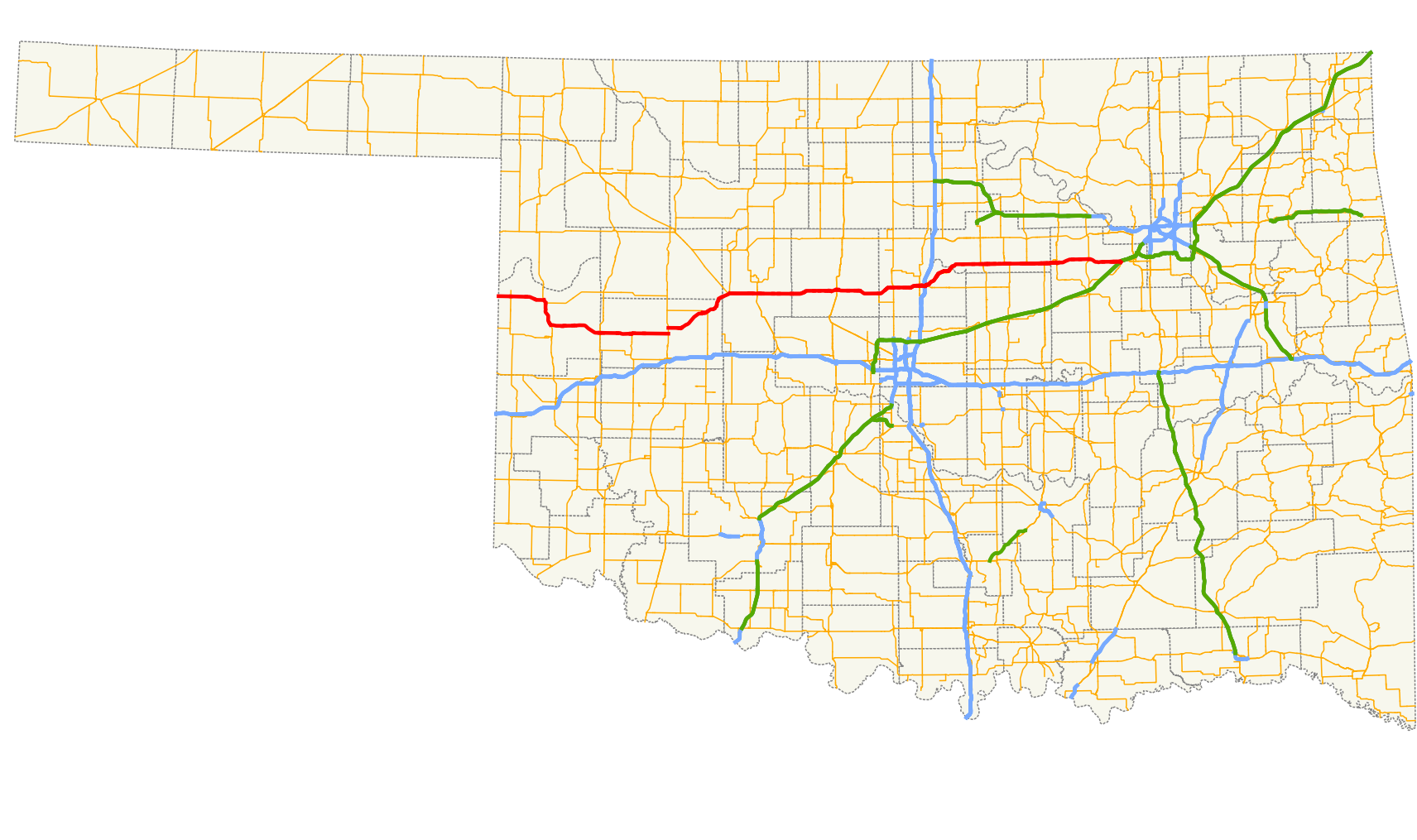

Route information
- Maintained by ODOT
- Length: 234.4 mi (377.2 km)

Major junctions
- West end: SH 33 at the Texas state line near Durham
- US 183 near Custer City; US 270 / US 281 / SH-3 from Fay to Watonga; US 81 / SH-3 in Kingfisher; US 77 in Guthrie; I-35 in Guthrie; US 177 in Perkins; I-44 / Turner Turnpike in Bristow
- East end: US 75 Alt. / SH-66 / SH-97 in Sapulpa

Location
- Country: United States
- State: Oklahoma

Highway system
- Oklahoma State Highway System; Interstate; US; State; Turnpikes
← SH-32	→ SH-34

State Highway 33 (SH-33 or OK-33) is a state highway in the U.S. state of Oklahoma. It is a major highway that traverses most of the state, and at one time traversed its entirety. Its general orientation is west to east.

== Route description ==
=== Roger Mills County ===
SH-33 begins as Texas State Highway 33 enters from Hemphill County, Texas. At mile 4.2, it intersects SH-30, which leads to Erick. The highway runs alongside the Black Kettle National Grassland to its intersection with US-283 at mile 15.7. Turning southward, SH-33 overlaps US-283 to mile 16.9 at the community of Roll, where SH-47 joins the concurrency. Together, the three routes pass through the National Grassland, and at mile 24.8, SH-33 turns to the east while US-283 and SH-47 continue south toward Cheyenne. At mile 29.5, SH-33 passes Strong City, and at mile 42.7 it passes the town of Hammon with its intersection with SH-34.

=== Custer County ===
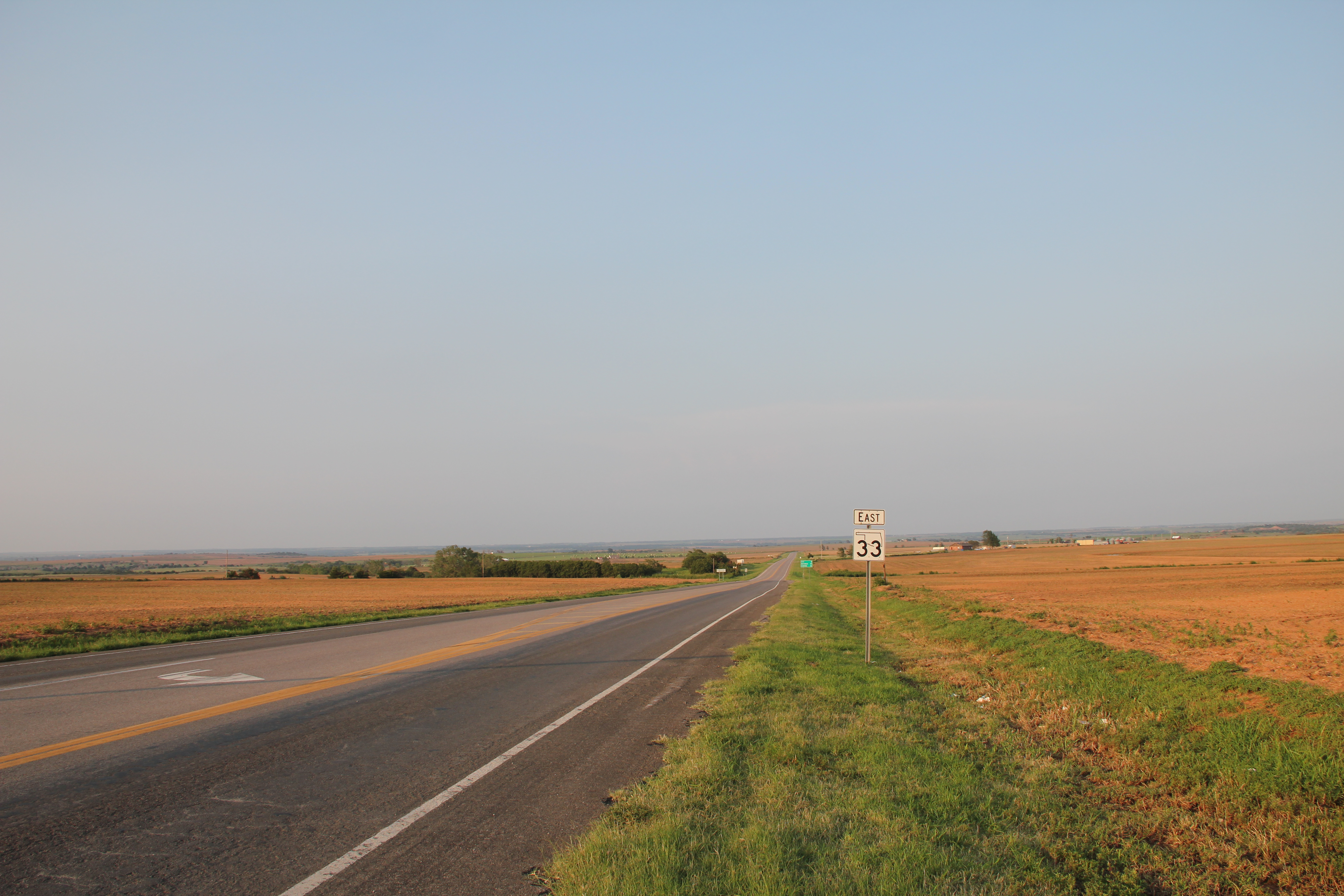
Looking northeast along OK-33 from its intersection with OK-54 just east of Thomas.

The intersection with SH-34 marks the county line. Mile 53.6 marks Butler, and at 53.8 SH-44 runs out, which leads south to Foss Lake, the town of Foss, and later Altus. At mile 66.2 SH-33 comes to US-183, which leads south to Clinton. SH-33 continues north concurrent with US-183 two miles (3 km) to mile 68.2, where US-183 continues northward to Taloga and SH-33 turns east once again. At mile 72.6, the highway intersects Custer City's Main Street before turning to the left. At mile 81.7 SH-33 enters Thomas at its second intersection with SH-47. At 83.8, SH-54 ends, which leads to Weatherford. At 87.0, SH-33 crosses the South Canadian River, and at mile 90.1 SH-33 enters Dewey County.

=== Dewey County ===
As SH-33 enters Dewey County, the section line road on the county line can be followed a few hundred yards west to the unincorporated settlement of Fay. After a mere 1.5 miles (2.4 km) in Dewey County, SH-33 enters Blaine County at mile 91.6.

=== Blaine County ===
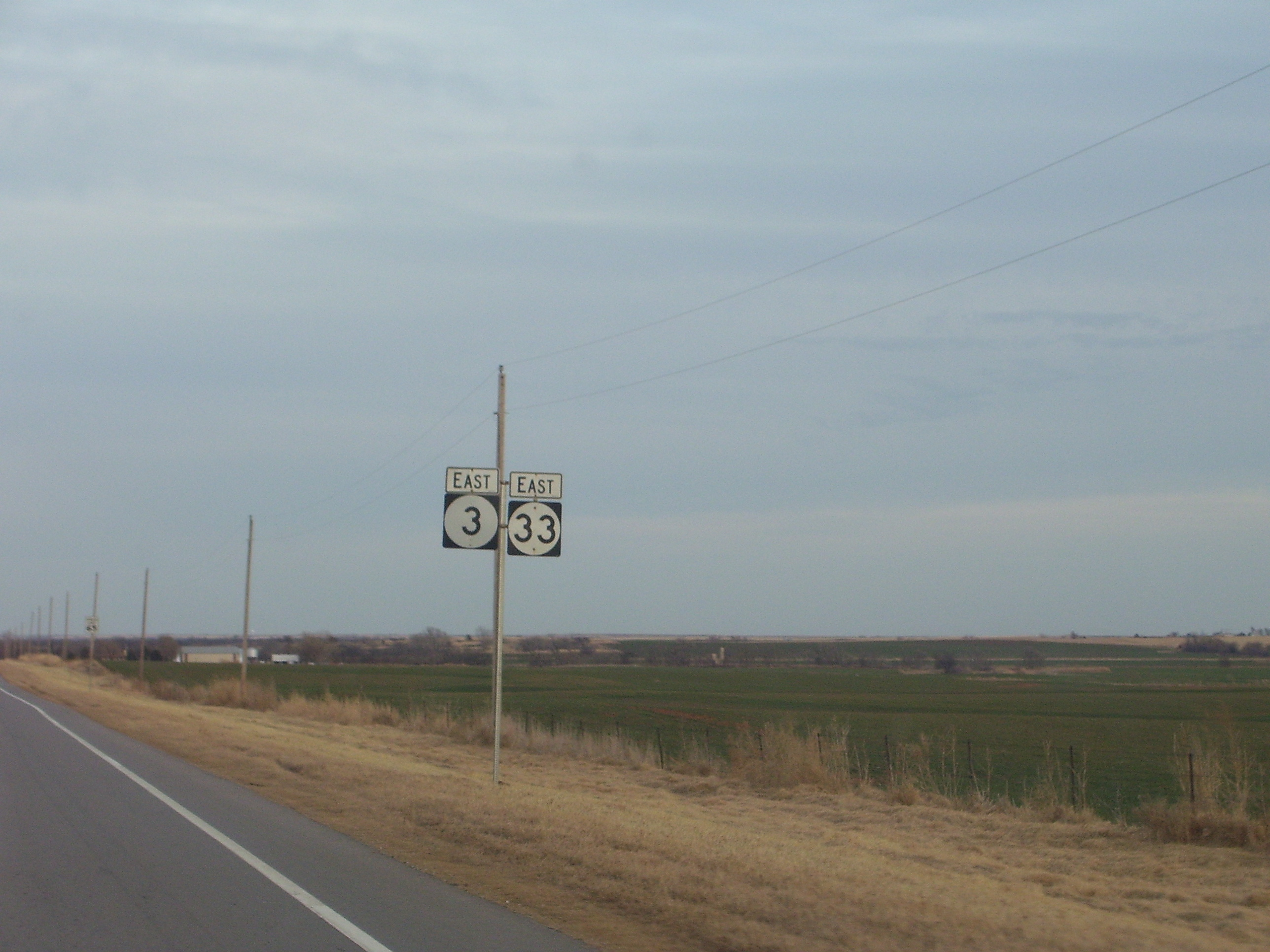
SH-3 and SH-33 concurrency in eastern Blaine County.

At mile 94.2, SH-33 reaches an intersection with US-270, US-281, SH-3, and SH-58. Here, SH-58 turns to the east, concurrent with US-270/SH-3 east and US-281 south. The roadway becomes four lanes at this point. At mile 101.3, the routes cross the North Canadian River. At mile 103.8, the routes reach Watonga and an intersection with SH-8 north, which leads to Roman Nose State Park. Here, US-270 and US-281 turn to the south toward Hinton and Red Rock Canyon State Park, and provide an alternate route to Oklahoma City. Upon leaving Watonga, the SH-3/SH-33 roadway reduces to a three-lane arrangement. The two routes continue east to the Kingfisher County line at mile 115.7.

=== Kingfisher County ===
Once SH-3/SH-33 have entered Kingfisher County, the road reduces to the conventional two lanes. At mile 131.5, the concurrency intersects US-81 in downtown Kingfisher. US-81 northbound goes to Enid and Wichita, whereas SH-3 diverges south onto US-81 southbound, which leads to Okarche, where the two highways split to reach Okla. City and El Reno respectively. This general vicinity is also the location of the crossing of the Chisholm Trail. At mile 146.3, SH-33 intersects SH-74F, which straddles the Logan County line south to Cashion.

=== Logan County ===
SH-33's path through Logan County mostly parallels the Cimarron River. At mile 152.0, SH-74 intersects SH-33 with a four-way stop. Northbound SH-74 leads to Crescent, and southbound SH-74 eventually becomes the Lake Hefner Parkway in Oklahoma City. For the next few miles, SH-33 passes through the Cedar Valley golf course complex, and at mile 161.2 intersects US-77 in downtown Guthrie, Oklahoma's first capital. Near the east end of Guthrie, SH-33 once again becomes a four-lane highway before intersecting I-35 at mile 162.9. At mile 163.1, SH-105 to Tryon cuts off to the right as SH-33 turns to the left. The historic SH-33 turns off to the right at mile 169.2, although the old alignment is not marked other than a sign pointing to the town of Langston. At mile 172.4 the driver may diverge from the highway to visit historic Langston University, before the new alignment merges with the old alignment at mile 173.3. At this point, the highway narrows to two lanes. The old alignment quickly diverges into the town at Coyle at mile 173.6, and the current roadway crosses the Cimarron River at mile 174.6.

=== Payne County ===
The Cimarron River forms the county line, where the scar from an old steel truss bridge is visible just east of the highway. In 2005, a brand new concrete bridge was built west of the old one. Shortly into Payne County, the highway rejoins the old alignment at mile 175.5. At mile 185.1, US-177 goes north to Stillwater and overlaps SH-33 eastbound for one mile (1.6 km). At 186.1, it returns to a two lane highway, and US-177 diverges south into Perkins and toward Shawnee. As SH-33 continues east through Payne County, it crosses the Cimarron River again at mile 193.1 before intersecting SH-108, which goes north to Ripley, at 193.5. At mile 195.3, SH-18 comes in from the south, and overlaps SH-33 into Cushing, the "Pipeline Capital of the World." At mile 201.6, SH-18 diverges north toward Pawnee. Upon exiting Cushing, SH-33 becomes a four-lane road forging eastward, and at mile 208.1 converges with SH-99, whose south leg leads to Stroud and Ada. The SH-33/SH-99 concurrency continues east into Creek County.

=== Creek County ===
OK-66/OK-33 West, Sapulpa, OK

Mile 209.8 is the county line, and shortly thereafter at mile 210.2, SH-33 Bypass provides a route for trucks to circumnavigate Drumright to the north and west. At mile 211.9, on the east side of Drumright, SH-99 diverges to the north toward Pawhuska, and SH-16 travels south toward Muskogee. SH-48 intersects SH-33 at mile 223.1, which goes south to Bristow and north to Cleveland. At mile 234.2 SH-33 intersects I-44, which in this location is the Turner Turnpike, a toll road to Oklahoma City and Tulsa. Shortly thereafter, SH-33 ends after a tenure of 234.4 miles (377.2 km) at SH-66. However, according to signage at the intersection, the highway actually turns northeast along SH-66 to downtown Sapulpa, where it seemingly ends at the intersection of Main St and Dewey Ave, making the total length approximately 238.9 miles (384.5 km).

== History ==
Until the early 1990s, SH-33 extended to the Arkansas state line. However, the advent of the ever-expanding US-412 in Oklahoma would have meant unnecessary concurrencies beyond its current terminus.

From the intersection of SH-66, SH-33 overlapped the then-US-66 through Sapulpa onto New Sapulpa Road, eventually merging into I-44 in west Tulsa. The three-route concurrency followed the present alignment of I-44 through Tulsa to Cherokee Curve, where SH-66 currently diverges into Catoosa. I-44 now continues another mile and a half or so to the Creek Turnpike, where the terminus of the Will Rogers Turnpike to Joplin, Missouri has been relocated. The old SH-33 followed the current US-412 to the junction of US-69, then north along US-69 a couple of miles, then back east, merging onto the current US-412 before crossing the Grand River. SH-33 followed the current Alternate US-412, whereas the Cherokee Turnpike parallels this narrow and winding road to the Flint Creek Valley. The historic SH-33 then followed the current alignment of US-412 to the Arkansas State Line, where it became AR-68 in Siloam Springs.

In the Tulsa area, Highway 33 is associated with Dan P. Holmes. Holmes was an insurance agency owner and Tulsa resident who frequently bought time on local nightly news broadcasts to give commentary on area matters of interest. He was concerned about what was then the mostly winding 2-lane Highway 33 from Tulsa to Arkansas, and seldom missed a broadcast opportunity to say that “we need to do somethin’ ‘bout this Highway 33.” Because of this connection in the public mind between Holmes and the improvement of the road, the widened segment of Highway 33 from Chouteau to its connection with Interstate 44 east of Tulsa was officially named the "Dan P. Holmes Expressway."

== Popular culture ==
SH-33 was featured in the 1996 film Twister. It is referred to as "Bob's Road" by the character Rabbit.

== Spurs and loops ==
- Truck SH-33 (2.3 mi/3.7 km) bypasses Drumright to the north and west, connecting with SH-99 at the eastern terminus.
- SH-33A (decommissioned; 0.1 mi/0.1 km) followed Denver Avenue in Tulsa between 2nd Street and 3rd Street. It was a connector between US 64 and US 75.
- SH-33C (decommissioned; 3.0 mi/4.8 km) is now SH-412A. Leads to Oaks in Delaware County.
- SH-33G (decommissioned; 5.3 mi/8.5 km) is now SH-412B. Goes through the Mid-America Industrial Park and ties in with SH-69A northeast of Chouteau.
- SH-33P (decommissioned; 1.2 mi/2.0 km) is now SH-412P. Goes south from US-412 along NS4140 Rd. to EW590 (Admiral Pl.), then along EW590 to the Verdigris River.

== Junction list ==
County	Location	mi	km	Destinations	Notes
Roger Mills		0.0	0.0	SH 33 west – Canadian	Continuation into Texas
Roger Mills		4.2	6.8	SH-30 – Durham, Erick	
Roger Mills		15.8	25.4	US 283 north – Arnett	Western end of US 283 concurrency
Roger Mills	Roll	17.0	27.4	SH-47 east to SH-34	Western end of SH-47 concurrency
Roger Mills		25.0	40.2	US 283 south / SH-47 east – Cheyenne	Eastern end of US 283 / SH-47 concurrency
Roger Mills	Hammon	42.9	69.0	SH-34 – Leedey, Elk City	
Custer	Butler	53.9	86.7	SH-44 south – Foss, Foss State Park	Northern terminus of SH-44
Custer		66.4	106.9	US 183 south – Arapaho, Clinton	Western end of US 183 concurrency
Custer		68.3	109.9	US 183 north – Taloga	Eastern end of US 183 concurrency
Custer	Thomas	81.7	131.5	SH-47 west – Leedey	Eastern terminus of SH-47
Custer	Thomas	83.9	135.0	SH-54 south – Weatherford	Northern terminus of SH-54
Dewey	No major junctions				
Blaine		94.3	151.8	US 270 / SH-3 west / US 281 north / SH-58 north – Seiling, Canton	Southern terminus of SH-58; west end of US-270/US-281/SH-3 overlap
Blaine	Watonga	103.9	167.2	US 270 east / US 281 south / SH-8 – Okeene, Geary	East end of US-270/US-281 overlap; access to Mercy Hospital Watonga
Kingfisher	Kingfisher	131.5	211.6	US 81 / SH-3 east (Main Street)	East end of SH-3 overlap; access to Mercy Hospital Kingfisher
Logan		146.4	235.6	SH-74F east – Cashion	Western terminus of SH-74F
Logan		152.1	244.8	SH-74 – Crescent, Oklahoma City	
Logan	Guthrie	161.2	259.4	US 77 (Wentz Street)	
Logan	Guthrie	162.9	262.2	I-35 – Perry, Oklahoma City	I-35 exit 157; diamond interchange
Logan		163.1	262.5	SH-105 east	Western terminus of SH-105
Payne		185.9	299.2	US 177 north – Stillwater	West end of US 177 concurrency
Payne	Perkins	186.8	300.6	US 177 south – Perkins	East end of US 177 concurrency
Payne		194.0	312.2	SH-108 north – Ripley	Southern terminus of SH-108
Payne		194.0	312.2	SH-18 south – Shawnee	West end of SH-18 concurrency
Payne	Cushing	202.0	325.1	SH-18 north (Little Avenue)	East end of SH-18 concurrency
Payne		208.7	335.9	SH-99 south – Stroud	West end of SH-99 concurrency
Creek	Drumright			SH-99 north / SH-33 Truck east	East end of SH-99 concurrency;western terminus of SH-33 Truck; access to Drumright Regional Hospital
Creek	Drumright	212.4	341.8	SH-33 Truck west (SH-99B north) / SH-16 east – Oilton, Shamrock	Western terminus of SH-16; eastern terminus of SH-33 Truck
Creek		223.6	359.8	SH-48 – Cleveland, Bristow	
Creek	Sapulpa	234.8	377.9	I-44 Toll / Turner Turnpike – Tulsa, Oklahoma City	I-44 exit 211
Creek	Sapulpa	235.1	378.4	SH-66 west – Kellyville	West end of SH-66 concurrency; former US 66 west
Creek	Sapulpa	237.8	382.7	SH-117 east	Western terminus of SH-117
Creek	Sapulpa	239.7	385.8	US 75 Alt. south (S. Main Street) / SH-66 east (Dewey Avenue) / SH-97 north (N. Main Street) to I-44	Eastern terminus; east end of SH-66 concurrency; northern terminus of US 75 Alt.; southern terminus of SH-97; road continues as SH-66 east (Dewey Ave.)/former US 66 east
1.000 mi = 1.609 km; 1.000 km = 0.621 mi: Concurrency terminus; Tolled
