= List of bridges documented by the Historic American Engineering Record in Oklahoma =

This is a list of bridges documented by the Historic American Engineering Record in the U.S. state of Oklahoma.

== Bridges ==
Survey No.	Name (as assigned by HAER)	Status	Type	Built	Documented	Carries	Crosses	Location	County	Coordinates
OK-2	Bridge over Bird Creek	Abandoned	Pratt truss	1915	1985		Bird Creek	Avant	Osage	36°29′11″N 96°03′50″W
OK-3	Pack Saddle Bridge	Replaced	Parker truss	1930	1984	US 283	South Canadian River	Roll	Roger Mills and Ellis	35°52′10″N 99°43′40″W
OK-5	Hominy Creek Bridge	Replaced	Pratt truss	1909	1990		Hominy Creek	Hominy	Osage	36°28′52″N 96°23′53″W
OK-7	Noble Avenue Viaduct	Replaced	Steel rolled stringer	1937	2014	SH-33 (Noble Avenue)	Cottonwood Creek	Guthrie	Logan	35°52′48″N 97°25′46″W
