= National Register of Historic Places listings in Roger Mills County, Oklahoma =

Location of Roger Mills County in Oklahoma

This is a list of the National Register of Historic Places listings in Roger Mills County, Oklahoma.

This is intended to be a complete list of the properties and districts on the National Register of Historic Places in Roger Mills County, Oklahoma, United States. The locations of National Register properties and districts for which the latitude and longitude coordinates are included below, may be seen in a map.

There are 7 properties and districts listed on the National Register in the county, including 1 National Historic Landmark.

This National Park Service list is complete through NPS recent listings posted October 23, 2026.

== Current listings ==
	Name on the Register	Image	Date listed	Location	City or town	Description
1	Allee Site	Allee Site	November 8, 1978 (#78002260)	Address Restricted	Hammon	
2	Antelope Hills	Antelope Hills	December 14, 1978 (#78002259)	North of Durham; 35°54′14″N 99°53′00″W	Durham	
3	Break O'Day Farm		June 16, 2005 (#05000616)	0.5 miles southeast of the junction of E0680 Rd. and N1750 Rd. 35°45′38″N 99°53′05″W	Durham	
4	Dorroh-Trent House		October 3, 1979 (#79002026)	11th and Conley Sts. 35°38′07″N 99°22′37″W	Hammon	
5	Goodwin-Baker Archeological Site		July 7, 1978 (#78002258)	Southern side of Sandstone Creek, northeast of Berlin; 35°28′44″N 99°36′18″W	Berlin	
6	Lamb-Miller Site	Lamb-Miller Site	October 2, 1978 (#78002261)	Address Restricted	Hammon	
7	Washita Battlefield National Historic Site	Washita Battlefield National Historic Site	October 15, 1966 (#66000633)	Northwest of Cheyenne on U.S. Route 283; 35°38′39″N 99°42′00″W	Cheyenne	

== See also ==
- List of National Historic Landmarks in Oklahoma
- National Register of Historic Places listings in Oklahoma
