= Oklahoma State Highway 47 =

State highway in Oklahoma, United States

State Highway 47

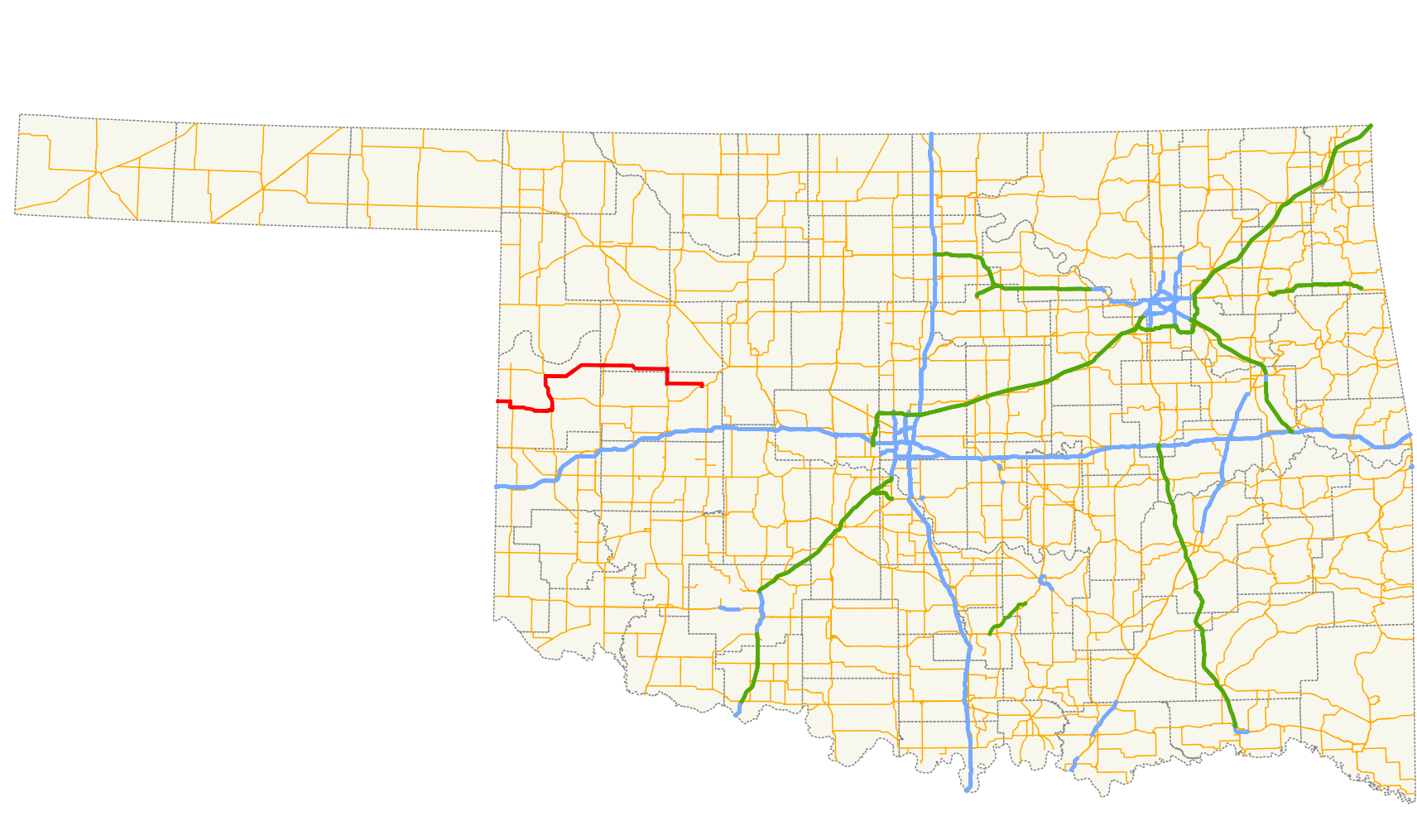

Route information
- Maintained by ODOT
- Length: 94.6 mi (152.2 km)
- Existed: November 12, 1936–present

Major junctions
- West end: FM 2124 at the Texas state line near Reydon
- US 283 from Cheyenne to Roll; US 183 from Putnam to Sunset
- East end: SH-33 in Thomas

Location
- Country: United States
- State: Oklahoma

Highway system
- Oklahoma State Highway System; Interstate; US; State; Turnpikes
← SH-46	→ SH-48

State Highway 47 (SH-47 or OK-47) is a state highway in Oklahoma. It runs 94.6 miles (152.2 km) west-to-east in Roger Mills, Dewey and Custer counties.

The current SH-47 was first established in late 1936. Over time it was expanded, reaching its current extent in 1945. A lettered spur route, SH-47A, was added in 1965.

== Route description ==
State Highway 47 begins at the Texas state line, where FM 2124 becomes SH-47 upon entering Oklahoma, in the Black Kettle National Grassland. Four miles (6.4 km) later, SH-30 joins the highway for a three-mile (5 km) concurrency just south of Reydon. Just outside the community of Rankin, SH-30 turns to the south, and SH-47 continues off to the east.

A few miles west of Cheyenne, SH-47A branches off in a loop to the north, rejoining Highway 47 in a couple of miles. South of Cheyenne, SH-47 joins US-283 for a concurrency to the north. SH-33 also joins in on the concurrency, with a signed direction opposite that of SH-47 (a wrong-way concurrency). SH-47 and US-283/SH-33 parts ways at Roll, where SH-47 resumes its travel to the east.

From Roll, the highway travels 21 miles (34 km) to a junction with SH-34 just south of Leedey. SH-47 continues east for 22 miles (35 km) until it reaches a junction with US-183. There, it turns to the south for a five-mile (8 km) concurrency. After leaving US-183, SH-47 travels another 13 miles (21 km) to the east to its terminus at SH-33 in Thomas.

== History ==
The current incarnation of State Highway 47 was first commissioned on November 12, 1936. Originally, the highway began at SH-34 south of Leedey and proceeded east to end at SH-14 (present-day US-183) south of Putnam. However, the road was removed from the state highway system just over a year later, on the last day of 1937. It was brought back with the same extent on June 19, 1939.

Throughout the early 1940s, SH-47 underwent a period of expansion. The first extension of the highway came on June 20, 1940, when it was extended west to end at US-283 in Roll. SH-47 was extended east to Thomas via US-183 on May 31, 1944. The final extension occurred on October 1, 1945, when the highway was extended south down US-283 to Cheyenne, then west to the Texas state line.

SH-33 and SH-47 swapped places west of US-283 on July 9, 1956; SH-47 proceeded due west of Roll to the Texas state line, while SH-33 passed through Cheyenne and turned toward the west south of there. This gave both highways straighter courses and resolved the wrong-way concurrency. However, the change was rescinded on August 13, 1956.

Two minor realignments were done to SH-47 in the 1960s. The first, on April 3, 1961, relocated the highway west of Aledo, while the other one, on May 5, 1964, adjusted it between Roll and Angora. SH-47 has undergone no changes since.

== Junction list ==
County	Location	mi	km	Destinations	Notes
Roger Mills		0.0	0.0	FM 2124	Western terminus, Oklahoma state line
Roger Mills	Reydon	4.2	6.8	SH-30	Northern end of SH-30 concurrency
Roger Mills	Rankin	7.1	11.4	SH-30	Southern end of SH-30 concurrency
Roger Mills		18.4	29.6	SH-47A	Western terminus of SH-47A
Roger Mills		19.9	32.0	SH-47A	Eastern terminus of SH-47A
Roger Mills		20.8	33.5	US 283	Southern end of US-283 concurrency
Roger Mills		25.4	40.9	SH-33	Southern end of SH-33 concurrency
Roger Mills	Roll	33.4	53.8	US 283 / SH-33	Northern end of US-283/SH-33 concurrency
Dewey		54.5	87.7	SH-34	
Dewey		76.8	123.6	US 183	Northern end of US-183 concurrency
Custer		81.8	131.6	US 183	Southern end of US-183 concurrency
Custer	Thomas	94.6	152.2	SH-33	Eastern terminus
1.000 mi = 1.609 km; 1.000 km = 0.621 mi: Concurrency terminus

== Spurs ==

Two highways have served as branch routes during SH-47's history. Both of these bore the SH-47A designation.

=== Historic ===
Historically, SH-47A was a spur serving the central business district of Reydon. The highway was commissioned on a temporary basis on February 8, 1950. Its alignment was adjusted, and the highway received a permanent commission, on January 8, 1951. The highway was turned back over to the town on December 6, 1954.

=== Current ===
The current SH-47A is a 2.15-mile (3.46 km) loop route that connects to SH-47 at both ends west of Cheyenne. The highway is entirely located within Roger Mills County and the Black Kettle National Grassland. It provides access to the Washita Battlefield National Historic Site.

SH-47A was commissioned on September 7, 1965.
