= Augusta Metcalfe =

American painter

- Born: Augusta Isabella Corson; November 10, 1881; Vermillion, Kansas, US
- Died: May 9, 1971 (aged 89); Durham, Oklahoma, US
- Known for: Landscape painting
- Awards: Oklahoma Hall of Fame; National Cowgirl Museum and Hall of Fame

Augusta Metcalfe (November 10, 1881–May 9, 1971) is a 1983 National Cowgirl Museum and Hall of Fame inductee.

== Life ==
Augusta Metcalf was born Augusta Isabella Corson on November 10, 1881, in Vermillion, Kansas. Metcalf's parents originated from Pennsylvania. They moved to Illinois briefly. Then they moved to Kansas where Metcalfe was born. Then they moved from Kansas with their four children to Oklahoma in 1886.

In 1886 when they moved to Oklahoma, it was to what is now known as the Oklahoma Panhandle. It was known at that time as No Man's Land, which was being applied to the Public Land Strip. While they lived there, the 1890 Organic Act made the strip part of Oklahoma Territory, which brought it homestead rights.

In 1893, the Corsons claimed a homestead at the mouth of Turkey Creek on the Washita River near Durham, Oklahoma. Durham is in the Western half of Oklahoma Territory which would become Day County. Later it would become Roger Mills County. Metcalfe was raised on that homestead. With neither school attendance or art lessons, she still won first prize in the state fair in 1911 for one of her paintings. It was here on this 640 acres that Metcalfe lived her remaining years.

== Career ==
Metcalfe was often referred to as "the Sagebrush Artist" due to her use of oils and watercolors. She used these types of paints to produce images that came from her own experiences of ranch life in Oklahoma in its early years.

In 1905, Metcalf married James Metcalfe. They had one child, Howard Metcalfe. In 1908, James left them. She took up the ranch operations but always found time to paint her scenery of western life. Her paintings were awarded prizes in state fairs and shows. Her paintings were displayed in galleries, including New York City. In 1950, Life Magazine featured reproductions of some of her art. She was inducted into the Oklahoma Hall of Fame in 1968.

== Legacy ==
Metcalfe died on May 9, 1971, in Oklahoma.

The former homestead of Augusta Metcalf was made into a museum after her death. The estate is now referred to as the Break O' Day Farm & Metcalfe Museum. The site is on the National Register of Historic Places listings in Roger Mills County, Oklahoma. The acreage of the property is still 640 acres. There are many exhibits on the property.
