= Sterling S. McColgin =

American farmer and politician

Member of the Oklahoma House of Representatives
- In office 1947–1951

Sterling Simison McColgin (June 14, 1901 – October 26, 1963) was an American farmer and politician.

McColgin was born in Ashkum, Illinois. He owned a farm between Cheyenne, Oklahoma and Reydon, Oklahoma. He served in the Oklahoma House of Representatives from 1947 to 1951 and from 1953 to 1955 and the Oklahoma Senate from 1955 to 1963 when he died while still in office. McColgin was a Democrat. McColgin also served as mayor of Reydon, Oklahoma. McColgin died suddenly in Cheyenne, Oklahoma while buying feed for his cattle at a feed store. His mother Bessie S. McColgin also served in the Oklahoma Legislature as the first woman elected to the Oklahoma House of Representatives.
