= Strong City, Oklahoma =

- Town
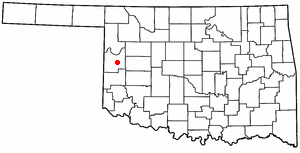
- Location of Strong City, Oklahoma
- Coordinates: 35°40′11″N 99°36′01″W
- Country: United States
- State: Oklahoma
- County: Roger Mills

Area
  - Total: 0.50 sq mi (1.29 km^{2})
  - Land: 0.50 sq mi (1.29 km^{2})
  - Water: 0 sq mi (0.00 km^{2})
- Elevation: 1,896 ft (578 m)

Population (2020)
  - Total: 33
  - Density: 66.3/sq mi (25.58/km^{2})
- Time zone: UTC-6 (Central (CST))
  - Summer (DST): UTC-5 (CDT)
- ZIP code: 73628
- Area code: 580
- FIPS code: 40-70950
- GNIS feature ID: 2413344

Strong City is a town in Roger Mills County, Oklahoma, United States. As of the 2020 census, the town's population was 33.

== History ==
The town of Strong City was formally established June 25, 1912. It was named for Clint Strong, a railroad official and entrepreneur instrumental in the town's organization. While Cheyenne, Oklahoma was originally designated as the county seat for Roger Mills County, construction of the nearest railroad into the area, the Clinton and Oklahoma Western Railway (“C&OW”) terminated in August 1912 at Strong City. More troubling to the people of Cheyenne was that Strong City had been laid out with a rocky knoll in the center, reserved for the County Courthouse should Strong City become the county seat instead of Cheyenne. Strong City also grew to become bigger than Cheyenne or any other town in the county, within a year of the railroad's arrival.

To keep their town's position, the citizens of Cheyenne responded by building the Cheyenne Short Line Railroad up the Washita River valley to Strong City to connect to the C&OW. In 1914 the courthouse in Cheyenne burned, and the fear again arose in Cheyenne that the citizens of Strong City would manage to have the new courthouse built there. But Cheyenne came up with the funding, and a new two-story brick courthouse was constructed in that town. Strong City nevertheless remained a competitor, and in 1932 managed to route a state highway (Oklahoma State Highway 33) through the town, passing well north of Cheyenne. However, extension of the C&OW to Cheyenne and eventually into the Texas Panhandle caused trade to shift to the west of the town. The 1930s were not kind to the municipality: in 1934 and 1935 several business houses relocated from Strong City to Cheyenne, losing the town population and businesses while Cheyenne grew during the decade. Today, Strong City is much smaller and Cheyenne remains the county seat.

== Geography ==
According to the United States Census Bureau, the town has a total area of 0.5 square miles (1.3 km^{2}), all land.

Strong City is located along State Highway 33. The town is in Southwestern Oklahoma, known for Oklahoma Tourism purposes as Great Plains Country. Strong City is essentially surrounded by the Black Kettle National Grassland, with Black Kettle Recreation Area and associated reservoir about 10 miles to the northwest. Washita Battlefield National Historic Site is about 11 miles southwest.

== Demographics ==
Historical population
Census	Pop.	Note	%±
1920	350		—
1930	353		0.9%
1940	245		−30.6%
1950	107		−56.3%
1960	51		−52.3%
1970	40		−21.6%
1980	56		40.0%
1990	49		−12.5%
2000	42		−14.3%
2010	47		11.9%
2020	33		−29.8%
U.S. Decennial Census

=== 2020 census ===
As of the 2020 census, Strong City had a population of 33. The median age was 48.3 years. 12.1% of residents were under the age of 18 and 18.2% of residents were 65 years of age or older. For every 100 females there were 73.7 males, and for every 100 females age 18 and over there were 81.2 males age 18 and over.

0.0% of residents lived in urban areas, while 100.0% lived in rural areas.

There were 11 households in Strong City, of which 18.2% had children under the age of 18 living in them. Of all households, 54.5% were married-couple households, 0.0% were households with a male householder and no spouse or partner present, and 45.5% were households with a female householder and no spouse or partner present. About 27.3% of all households were made up of individuals and 27.3% had someone living alone who was 65 years of age or older.

There were 20 housing units, of which 45.0% were vacant. The homeowner vacancy rate was 15.4% and the rental vacancy rate was 100.0%.

Racial composition as of the 2020 census
Race	Number	Percent
White	27	81.8%
Black or African American	0	0.0%
American Indian and Alaska Native	0	0.0%
Asian	0	0.0%
Native Hawaiian and Other Pacific Islander	0	0.0%
Some other race	0	0.0%
Two or more races	6	18.2%
Hispanic or Latino (of any race)	2	6.1%

=== 2000 census ===
As of the census of 2000, there were 42 people, 16 households, and 15 families residing in the town. The population density was 82.2 inhabitants per square mile (31.7/km^{2}). There were 17 housing units at an average density of 33.3 per square mile (12.9/km^{2}). The racial makeup of the town was 85.71% White, 9.52% Native American, and 4.76% from two or more races.

There were 16 households, out of which 31.3% had children under the age of 18 living with them, 75.0% were married couples living together, 6.3% had a female householder with no husband present, and 6.3% were non-families. 6.3% of all households were made up of individuals, and 6.3% had someone living alone who was 65 years of age or older. The average household size was 2.63 and the average family size was 2.60.

In the town, the population was spread out, with 21.4% under the age of 18, 7.1% from 18 to 24, 26.2% from 25 to 44, 16.7% from 45 to 64, and 28.6% who were 65 years of age or older. The median age was 42 years. For every 100 females, there were 82.6 males. For every 100 females age 18 and over, there were 83.3 males.

The median income for a household in the town was $27,500, and the median income for a family was $27,500. Males had a median income of $23,750 versus $26,250 for females. The per capita income for the town was $13,474. There were 12.5% of families and 21.4% of the population living below the poverty line, including 37.5% of under eighteens and none of those over 64.

== Education ==
It is in the Cheyenne Public Schools school district.
