= Oklahoma State Highway 30 =

Highway in Oklahoma

State Highway 30

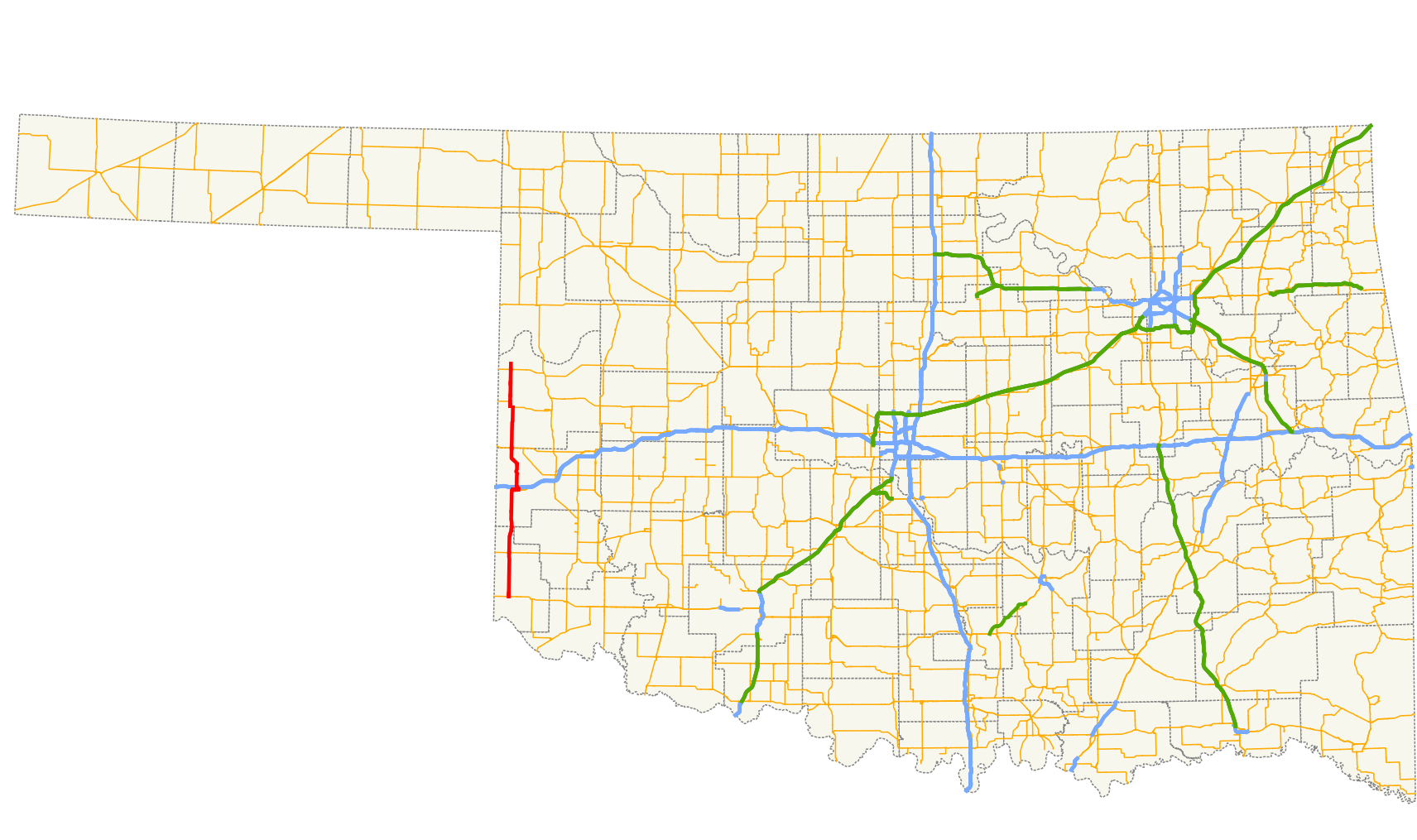

Route information
- Maintained by ODOT
- Length: 84.4 mi (135.8 km)
- Existed: March 31, 1936–present

Major junctions
- South end: US 62 in Hollis
- SH-9 near Madge; I-40 / I-40 BL in Erick
- North end: Durham

Location
- Country: United States
- State: Oklahoma

Highway system
- Oklahoma State Highway System; Interstate; US; State; Turnpikes
| ← SH-29 | → SH-31 |

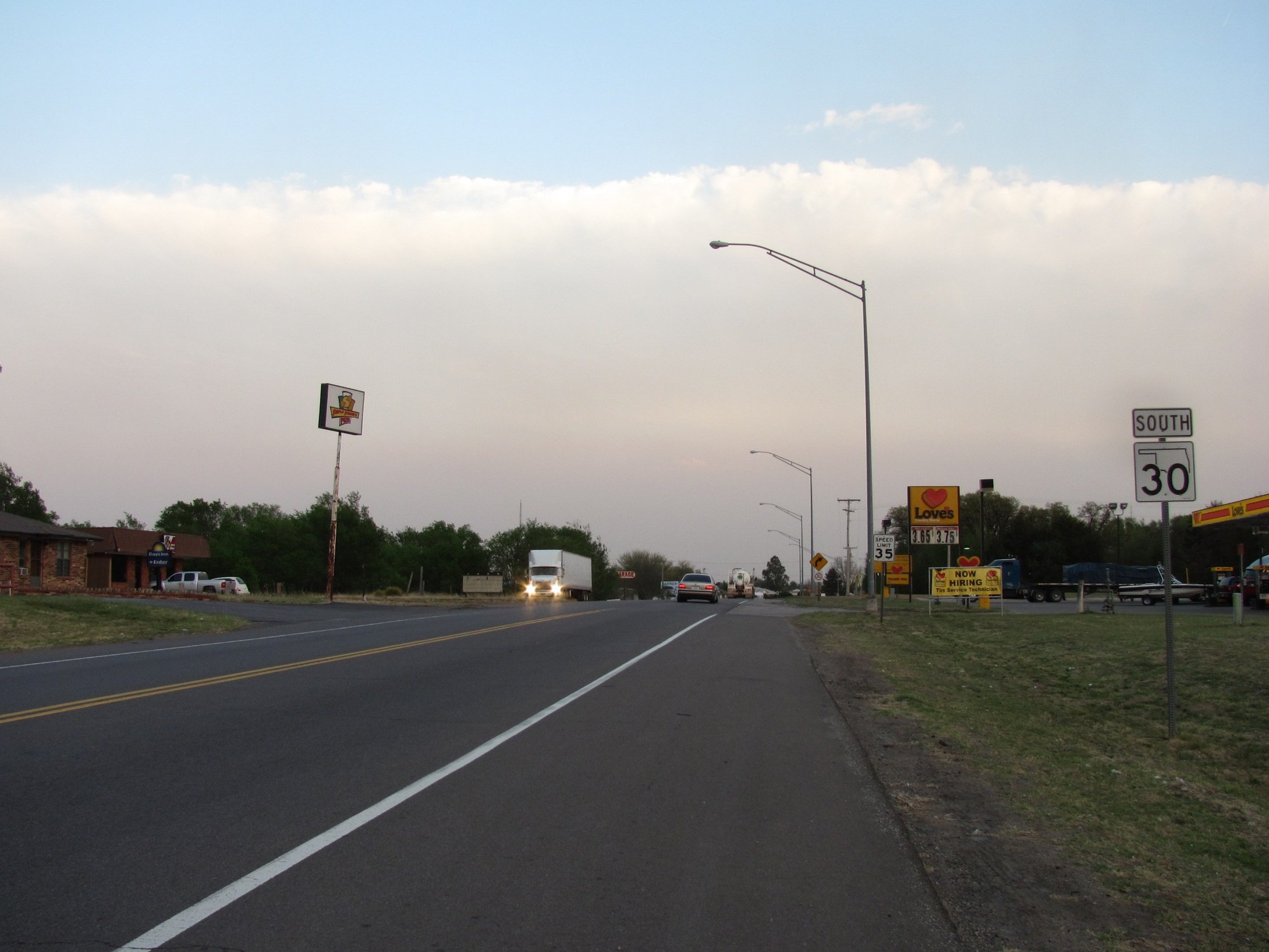
Southbound in Erick, Oklahoma

State Highway 30 (abbreviated SH-30) is a state highway in Oklahoma. It runs 84.4 miles (135.8 km) south-to-north along the western edge of the state, from U.S. Highway 62 (US-62) in Hollis to the town of Durham, two miles (3 km) north of SH-33. It passes through Harmon, Beckham and Roger Mills counties. SH-30 does not have any letter-suffixed spur routes branching from it.

The SH-30 designation dates back to March 31, 1936, when it spanned from Erick to Sweetwater. The highway gradually evolved over the years, reaching its current form in 1970.

== Route description ==
SH-30 begins at US-62 in Hollis, the seat of Harmon County. It travels north through very sparsely populated terrain to the unincorporated settlement of McKnight, about six miles (9.7 km) north of Hollis. North of McKnight, the highway crosses the Salt Fork of the Red River. SH-30 has a junction with SH-9, nine miles (14 km) north of McKnight. For the next 22 miles (35 km) through rural Western Oklahoma, SH-30 roughly parallels the Texas state line, lying generally about five miles (8.0 km) west of it. The highway bridges over the Elm Fork of the Red River about two miles (3.2 km) before crossing into Beckham County.

Two miles (3.2 km) west of Erick, SH-30 intersects Interstate 40 Business. SH-30 begins a concurrency with the business loop, traveling east into the town. In Erick, SH-30 turns back to the north, interchanging with Interstate 40, then crossing the North Fork of the Red River and running through the unincorporated settlement of Mayfield. About fifteen miles (24 km) north of Erick, it comes to an intersection with SH-152 in Sweetwater. At this point, it crosses into Roger Mills County.

From Sweetwater, SH-30 travels north for fourteen miles (23 km) to SH-47, which it joins for three miles (4.8 km), to the town of Reydon. Leaving Reydon, SH-30 continues alone across the Black Kettle National Grassland, continuing north for twelve miles (19 km) to its junction with SH-33. After crossing SH-33, SH-30 continues on for two miles (3.2 km) to its terminus at a local road at Durham.

== History ==
State Highway 30 was added to the highway system on March 31, 1936. At this time, SH-30 began at US-66 in Erick and ended at what was then numbered SH-41 (present-day SH-152) in Sweetwater. On November 18, the highway was extended west along US-66, then south, setting its southern terminus at its present location at US-62 in Hollis. The 1937 state highway map was the first to show SH-30.

The following year, a large portion of the highway was removed from the state highway system. On October 19, 1937, between the SH-9 junction and US-66, the route ceased to be maintained by the Department of Highways. SH-30 still appeared as such on the 1938 state highway map, but with dashed lines, indicating the route was not maintained. By the 1940 edition, SH-30 was not marked at all on the map between just north of SH-9 to US-66 west of Erick. As a result, SH-30 was effectively in two sections, one running from Hollis to SH-9, and another between Erick and Sweetwater.

On April 14, 1941, the southern SH-30 was extended further to the south. The highway proceeded east from Hollis along US-62, then, at Gould, turned south along what was previously an unnumbered farm-to-market road. The route turned back east to end at SH-34 and SH-44 in Eldorado. This extension encompassed all of the present-day western SH-5. By January 1942, however, this extension of SH-30 would be split off to form the new SH-90.

The two sections of SH-30 were reunited on August 13, 1945, with the reincorporation of the SH-9 to Erick stretch into the route. The newly-continuous highway was extended north three months later on November 21, when it was extended north of Sweetwater for the first time, ending in Reydon (concurrent with SH-47). On February 7, 1955, SH-30 was extended north to Durham.

From the late 1950s through the 1960s, SH-30 extended south to the Texas state line. On February 18, 1958, the highway was extended to run west along US-62, then split off to the south two miles (3.2 km) east of the north–south Texas state line. The highway then ended at a bridge over the Prairie Dog Town Fork of the Red River, the southern Oklahoma–Texas boundary. The route was truncated back to Hollis on March 2, 1970.

== Junction list ==
| County | Location | mi | km | Destinations | Notes |
|---|---|---|---|---|---|
| Harmon | Hollis | 0.0 | 0.0 | US 62 | Southern terminus |
| Harmon | | 15.1 | 24.3 | SH-9 | |
| Beckham | | 37.0 | 59.5 | I-40 BL | Western end of I-40 Bus. concurrency |
| Beckham | Erick | 39.07 | 62.88 | I-40 BL | Eastern end of I-40 Bus. concurrency |
| Beckham | Erick | 39.95 | 64.29 | I-40 | Interchange, I-40 exit 7 |
| Roger Mills | Sweetwater | 54.50 | 87.71 | SH-152 | |
| Roger Mills | Rankin | 68.56 | 110.34 | SH-47 | Southern end of SH-47 concurrency |
| Roger Mills | Reydon | 71.43 | 114.96 | SH-47 | Northern end of SH-47 concurrency |
| Roger Mills | | 82.46 | 132.71 | SH-33 | |
| Roger Mills | Durham | 84.45 | 135.91 | E0810 Road | Northern terminus |
1.000 mi = 1.609 km; 1.000 km = 0.621 mi: Concurrency terminus
