= Bessie S. McColgin =

American politician (1875–1972)

Bessie McColgin

Member of the Oklahoma House of Representatives from the Roger Mills County district
- In office 1920–1923
- Preceded by: J. T. Nicholson
- Succeeded by: W. A. Adams

Personal details
- Born: Amelia Elizabeth Simison; January 7, 1875 Minneapolis, Kansas, U.S.
- Died: July 9, 1972 (aged 97) Sayre, Oklahoma, U.S.
- Party: Republican
- Spouse: Grant McColgin (m. 1895)
- Children: 10, including Sterling S. McColgin (son)

Amelia Elizabeth Simison McColgin (January 7, 1875 – July 9, 1972), known as Bessie McColgin, was an American businesswoman and politician. A native of Kansas, she moved to western Oklahoma Territory in 1901. In 1920, she was the first woman elected to the Oklahoma House of Representatives.

== Early life and family ==
Amelia Elizabeth Simison was born in Minneapolis, Kansas, on January 7, 1875, to Edward Harding Simison and his wife, Jane Eliza Moody. Orphaned when she was three years old, she was raised by relatives in Earlville, Illinois and educated at the Teachers Normal College and Illinois Wesleyan University. She married Grant McColgin (1870-1955) in 1895, and they moved to Oklahoma Territory in 1901. The Encyclopedia of Oklahoma History and Culture states that her husband bought a relinquishment in Roger Mills County, Oklahoma, in 1903. (Note: Presumably this meant that he acquired land that had been claimed, then abandoned by a previous settler. Roger Mills County, Oklahoma was created from the short-lived Day County, Oklahoma Territory, after Oklahoma became a state in 1907.) Bessie McColgin became a school teacher and the postmistress of the Ridgeton Post Office. A few years later, the family moved to Rankin, where she and her husband established the Rankin Telephone Company in their home. She organized a Women's Christian Temperance Union chapter, and was a school teacher in Rankin's first public school. One of her sons, Sterling S. McColgin, also served in the Oklahoma Legislature.

== Career ==
McColgin was elected to the Oklahoma House of Representatives in 1920 to represent the Roger Mills County district. While pregnant with her 10th child, she became the first woman elected to the Oklahoma House. She served between 1921 and 1922. According to legend, men in her family entered her name in the election as a Republican without her knowledge. She was seen as a "superior orator."

While in office, McColgin was heavily involved in health and safety legislation, and introduced a bill to create a Bureau of Child Hygiene. She attempted to pass legislation from Senator Lamar Looney, but few bills succeeded. She was also involved in a soldiers' relief program and helped establish a Tuberculosis Sanatorium in Oklahoma.

Although she was not re-elected for a second term, three new woman members of the Oklahoma House of Representatives were elected in 1923. On the last day of her term, McColgin was presented with a wristwatch from her male colleagues to commemorate her service, which they jokingly stated was because "women legislators need to be watched". Nearly 40 years after her term ended, McColgin's son, Sterling, was elected to the same seat she had filled.

== Death ==
McColgin died at the age of 97 in Sayre, Oklahoma, on July 9, 1972. She was posthumously inducted into the Oklahoma Women's Hall of Fame in 2005.
