= Skipout Lake =

Coordinates: 35.636°N 99.884°W

- Location in Oklahoma
- Location: Roger Mills County, Oklahoma, United States
- Type: Artificial lake
- Basin countries: United States
- Surface area: 60 acres (24 ha)
- Shore length^{1}: Inside Black Kettle National Grassland
- ^{1} Shore length is not a well-defined measure.

Skipout Lake is located in Roger Mills County about 2 miles south and 3 miles east of Reydon in the State of Oklahoma. It is inside the Black Kettle National Grassland, which is managed by the Cibola National Forest. It is 60 acres in size. (Note: Some sources say 47 or 48 acres in size.) The lake is open year round, and has picnic areas, outdoor grills, and boat ramps/docks. Camping and RV facilities are also available.

Skipout Lake is known for its bass population, particularly largemouth bass and white bass, as well as for white crappie. It is a “no-wake” lake with an established 5mph speed limit.
