= Grimes, Oklahoma =

- Unincorporated community
- Location within Oklahoma
- Coordinates: 35°27′58″N 99°45′39″W
- Country: United States
- State: Oklahoma
- County: Roger Mills
- Elevation: 2,261 ft (689 m)
- Time zone: UTC-6 (Central (CST))
  - Summer (DST): UTC-5 (CDT)
- Area code: 580
- GNIS feature ID: 1100467

Grimes is an unincorporated community in Roger Mills County, Oklahoma, United States. Grimes is located in the southern part of the county, 11.4 miles (18.3 km) south-southwest of Cheyenne.

The Grimes post office opened on March 1, 1901 with John Gernade Lancaster as first Postmaster, and closed on November 26, 1971. Benjamin C. Olson was the last postmaster in Grimes. He then became the postmaster in nearby Sweetwater, Oklahoma. The community was named for acting Oklahoma territorial governor William C. Grimes.

Grimes was hit by a violent tornado on the night of April 9, 1947. The tornado was the same night as the Woodward, Oklahoma tornado. The Grimes tornado resulted in the destruction of the blacksmith shop, one home and barn. The home, owned by Ole C Olson and wife Leah Turbyfill Olson was partially destroyed. Ole C Olson was mortally wounded and later died in an Oklahoma City Hospital.
