= Berlin, Oklahoma =

Berlin
- Unincorporated community
- Location within the state of Oklahoma Berlin (the United States)
- Coordinates: 35°27′02″N 99°37′31″W
- Country: United States
- State: Oklahoma
- County: Roger Mills
- Elevation: 2,165 ft (660 m)
- Time zone: UTC-6 (Central (CST))
  - Summer (DST): UTC-5 (CDT)
- GNIS feature ID: 1090014

Berlin is an unincorporated community in southeastern Roger Mills County, Oklahoma, United States. U.S. Route 283 passes 1.5 miles west of the community. Sayre is eleven miles to the south and Elk City is approximately 12 miles to the east on U.S. Route 40.

The Berlin Post Office opened September 2, 1896, and closed May 5, 1967. The 1905 Oklahoma Territorial Census gave the population for the town as sixty. The town had two newspapers in its early history, the Berlin Venture and the Berlin Herald.

The Goodwin-Baker Archaeological Site, a Plains Village period (A.D. 1000 to 1500) research location northeast of Berlin, is on the National Register of Historic Places listings in Roger Mills County, Oklahoma.

On Tuesday, April 12, 2022, Berlin experienced a rare weather phenomena, known as a 'Firenado.'
