= Fay, Oklahoma =

- Census-designated place
- Location within the state of Oklahoma Fay (the United States)
- Coordinates: 35°48′58″N 98°39′31″W
- Country: United States
- State: Oklahoma
- County: Dewey

Area
  - Total: 0.50 sq mi (1.29 km^{2})
  - Land: 0.50 sq mi (1.29 km^{2})
  - Water: 0 sq mi (0.00 km^{2})
- Elevation: 1,696 ft (517 m)

Population (2020)
  - Total: 32
  - Density: 64.0/sq mi (24.71/km^{2})
- Time zone: UTC-6 (Central (CST))
  - Summer (DST): UTC-5 (CDT)
- FIPS code: 40-25700
- GNIS feature ID: 2805315

Fay is an unincorporated community located on State Highway 33 in the extreme southeastern corner of Dewey County, Oklahoma, United States. As of the 2020 census, Fay had a population of 32.

== History ==
Platted along the St. Louis-San Francisco Railway line, the Fay Post Office opened April 19, 1894. Fay was named after Fay Fisco, the son of the first postmaster.

== Demographics ==
Historical population
Census	Pop.	Note	%±
2020	32		—
U.S. Decennial Census

=== 2020 census ===
As of the 2020 census, Fay had a population of 32. The median age was 38.5 years. 21.9% of residents were under the age of 18 and 31.3% of residents were 65 years of age or older. For every 100 females there were 166.7 males, and for every 100 females age 18 and over there were 150.0 males age 18 and over.

0.0% of residents lived in urban areas, while 100.0% lived in rural areas.

There were 15 households in Fay, of which 13.3% had children under the age of 18 living in them. Of all households, 66.7% were married-couple households, 13.3% were households with a male householder and no spouse or partner present, and 13.3% were households with a female householder and no spouse or partner present. About 20.0% of all households were made up of individuals and 6.7% had someone living alone who was 65 years of age or older.

There were 18 housing units, of which 16.7% were vacant. The homeowner vacancy rate was 0.0% and the rental vacancy rate was 0.0%.

Racial composition as of the 2020 census
Race	Number	Percent
White	28	87.5%
Black or African American	0	0.0%
American Indian and Alaska Native	2	6.2%
Asian	0	0.0%
Native Hawaiian and Other Pacific Islander	0	0.0%
Some other race	1	3.1%
Two or more races	1	3.1%
Hispanic or Latino (of any race)	0	0.0%

== Education ==
It is in the Thomas-Fay-Custer Unified Schools school district.

== Sources ==
- Shirk, George H. Oklahoma Place Names. Norman: University of Oklahoma Press, 1987. ISBN 0-8061-2028-2.
