= Hammon, Oklahoma =

Hammon, Oklahoma Hiisiis Be'eih (Arapaho) Éše'hȯhma'ȧhevēno (Cheyenne)
- Town
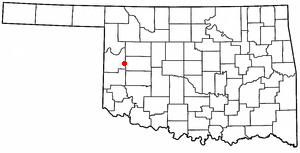
- Location of Hammon, Oklahoma
- Coordinates: 35°37′56″N 99°22′53″W
- Country: United States
- State: Oklahoma
- Counties: Roger Mills, Custer

Area
  - Total: 0.73 sq mi (1.90 km^{2})
  - Land: 0.73 sq mi (1.90 km^{2})
  - Water: 0 sq mi (0.00 km^{2})
- Elevation: 1,742 ft (531 m)

Population (2020)
  - Total: 479
  - Density: 654.4/sq mi (252.65/km^{2})
- Time zone: UTC-6 (Central (CST))
  - Summer (DST): UTC-5 (CDT)
- ZIP code: 73650
- Area code: 580
- FIPS code: 40-32250
- GNIS feature ID: 2412722

Hammon (Note: Arapaho: Hiisiis Be'eih Cheyenne: Éše'hȯhma'ȧhevēno) is a town in the U.S. state of Oklahoma, the majority of which is in Roger Mills County, but some of which extends into Custer County. It is located at the junction of Oklahoma State Highways 33 and 34.

The town is named for Indian agent James H. Hammon, who was assigned to the Red Moon Agency near the future site of Hammon. This was a subagency of the Cheyenne-Arapaho Agency at Darlington, north of Fort Reno, and his mission was to build a reservation school and to teach the Cheyenne and Arapaho to farm. His wife, Ida M. Hammon, was postmaster when a post office was established in their home on June 30, 1894.

The townsite was originally located in Custer County, but when the Wichita Falls and Northwestern Railroad (later known as the Missouri, Kansas and Texas Railway) laid track west of the town in 1910, the majority of the town was moved west into Roger Mills County to be near the railroad. On May 22, 1911, the board of county commissioners accepted the incorporation of the town.

The population was 479 at the time of the 2020 census.

== Geography ==
According to the United States Census Bureau, the town has a total area of 0.7 square miles (1.9 km^{2}), all land.

Hammon is located southwest of the intersection of State Highway 33 and State Highway 34 in Southwestern Oklahoma, known for Oklahoma Tourism purposes as Great Plains Country. The town is just west of the Washita National Wildlife Refuge, and just east of the Black Kettle National Grassland.

=== Climate ===
Climate data for Hammon, Oklahoma
Month	Jan	Feb	Mar	Apr	May	Jun	Jul	Aug	Sep	Oct	Nov	Dec	Year
Mean daily maximum °F (°C)	48 (9)	53 (12)	62 (17)	71 (22)	78 (26)	89 (32)	95 (35)	93 (34)	86 (30)	73 (23)	60 (16)	50 (10)	72 (22)
Mean daily minimum °F (°C)	23 (−5)	28 (−2)	32 (0)	42 (6)	53 (12)	62 (17)	68 (20)	66 (19)	57 (14)	44 (7)	32 (0)	26 (−3)	44 (7)
Average precipitation inches (mm)	0.8 (20)	1.0 (25)	1.7 (43)	2.5 (64)	4.2 (110)	3.6 (91)	2.1 (53)	2.6 (66)	3.0 (76)	2.3 (58)	1.6 (41)	1.0 (25)	26.1 (660)
Source 1: weather.com
Source 2: Weatherbase.com

== Demographics ==
Historical population
Census	Pop.	Note	%±
1920	440		—
1930	736		67.3%
1940	705		−4.2%
1950	621		−11.9%
1960	656		5.6%
1970	677		3.2%
1980	866		27.9%
1990	611		−29.4%
2000	469		−23.2%
2010	568		21.1%
2020	479		−15.7%
U.S. Decennial Census

=== 2020 census ===
As of the 2020 census, Hammon had a population of 479. The median age was 35.7 years. 29.6% of residents were under the age of 18 and 16.9% of residents were 65 years of age or older. For every 100 females there were 91.6 males, and for every 100 females age 18 and over there were 97.1 males age 18 and over.

0.0% of residents lived in urban areas, while 100.0% lived in rural areas.

There were 157 households in Hammon, of which 36.9% had children under the age of 18 living in them. Of all households, 54.1% were married-couple households, 17.8% were households with a male householder and no spouse or partner present, and 26.1% were households with a female householder and no spouse or partner present. About 21.0% of all households were made up of individuals and 7.7% had someone living alone who was 65 years of age or older.

There were 194 housing units, of which 19.1% were vacant. The homeowner vacancy rate was 9.8% and the rental vacancy rate was 13.6%.

Racial composition as of the 2020 census
Race	Number	Percent
White	290	60.5%
Black or African American	1	0.2%
American Indian and Alaska Native	92	19.2%
Asian	0	0.0%
Native Hawaiian and Other Pacific Islander	0	0.0%
Some other race	14	2.9%
Two or more races	82	17.1%
Hispanic or Latino (of any race)	59	12.3%

=== 2000 census ===
As of the census of 2000, there were 469 people, 169 households, and 114 families residing in the town. The population density was 637.0 inhabitants per square mile (245.9/km^{2}). There were 203 housing units at an average density of 275.7 per square mile (106.4/km^{2}). The racial makeup of the town was 60.77% White, 0.64% African American, 34.54% Native American, 0.21% Asian, 1.71% from other races, and 2.13% from two or more races. Hispanic or Latino of any race were 5.76% of the population.

There were 169 households, out of which 33.7% had children under the age of 18 living with them, 47.3% were married couples living together, 16.6% had a female householder with no husband present, and 32.0% were non-families. 29.0% of all households were made up of individuals, and 13.6% had someone living alone who was 65 years of age or older. The average household size was 2.78 and the average family size was 3.49.

In the town, the population was spread out, with 29.9% under the age of 18, 10.0% from 18 to 24, 28.6% from 25 to 44, 21.3% from 45 to 64, and 10.2% who were 65 years of age or older. The median age was 34 years. For every 100 females, there were 108.4 males. For every 100 females age 18 and over, there were 101.8 males.

The median income for a household in the town was $22,604, and the median income for a family was $28,036. Males had a median income of $22,250 versus $20,500 for females. The per capita income for the town was $10,184. About 31.5% of families and 34.8% of the population were below the poverty line, including 44.8% of those under age 18 and 19.5% of those age 65 or over.

== Education ==
- The school district is Hammon Public Schools
- Hammon Public School is a member of the Western Technology Center District. WTC provides the opportunity for adults and high school students to get occupationally-specific training. As a member of the WTC district, high school juniors and seniors living in the Hammon School District have the opportunity to attend classes at the WTC campus in Burns Flat. High school students who are residents of the WTC District can enroll in WTC full-time training on a tuition-free basis. Adult students are allowed to attend classes on a tuition basis. Tuition for adult students is $2.00 per training hour. Adult students can apply for financial assistance to attend WTC.

== Historic Locations ==
Three NRHP listings are in or around Hammon:

- Dorroh-Trent House
- Allee Site, a Plains Village period (A.D. 1000 to 1500) archeological location.
- Lamb-Miller Site, also a Plains Village archeological location.

== Notable people ==
- Joe Stanka, Major League Baseball pitcher, was born in Hammon.
- Bess Stinson, Arizona state legislator and businesswoman, was born in Hammon, in Roger Mills County.
