= Sweetwater, Oklahoma =

Town in Oklahoma, US

- Town
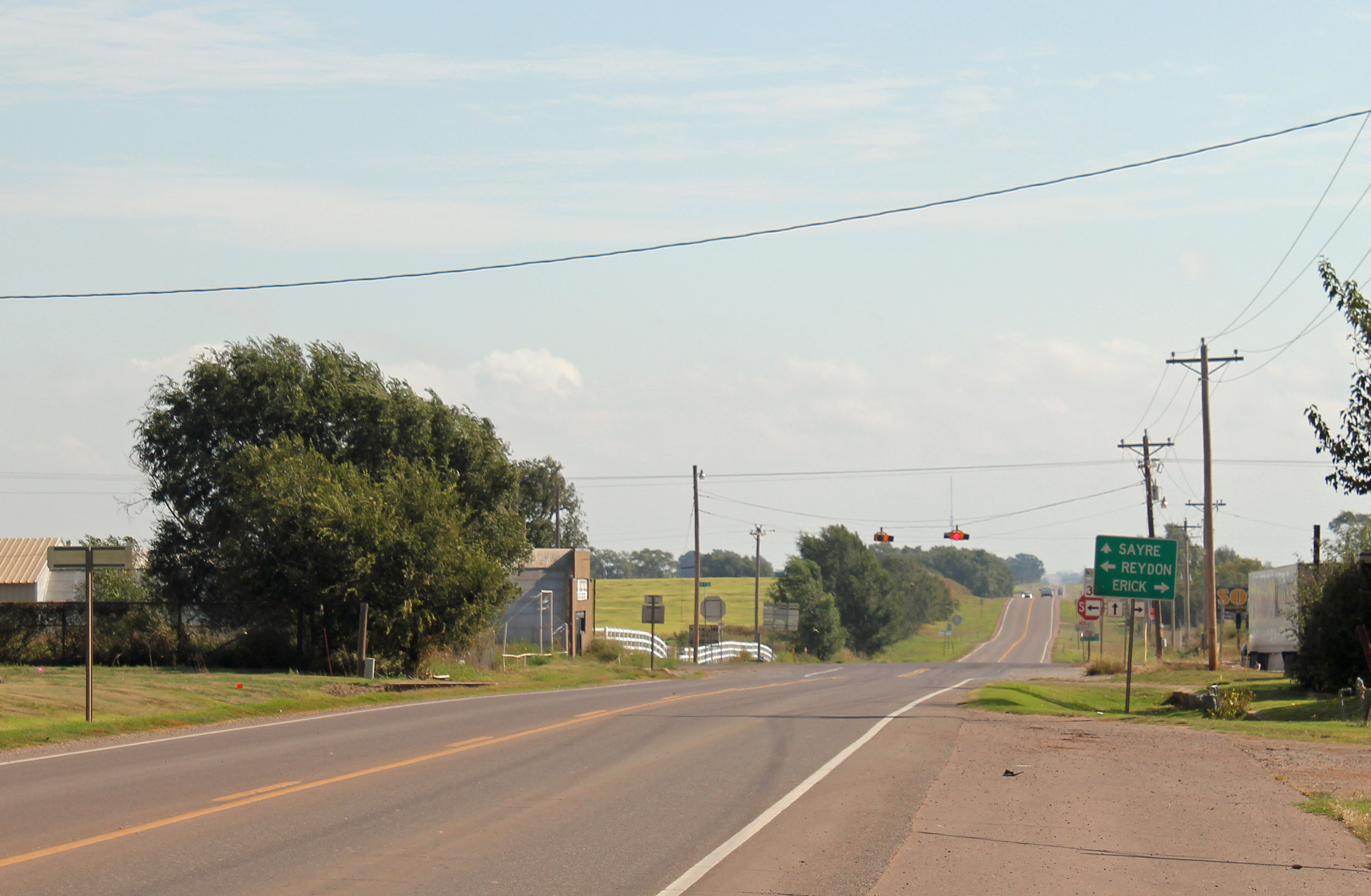
- Looking east on Oklahoma State Highway 152

- Location in Beckham and Roger Mills counties and the state of Oklahoma

- Location in Oklahoma Location in the United States
- Coordinates: 35°25′20″N 99°54′42″W
- Country: United States
- State: Oklahoma
- County: Beckham, Roger Mills

Area
  - Total: 15.87 sq mi (41.11 km^{2})
  - Land: 15.86 sq mi (41.07 km^{2})
  - Water: 0.015 sq mi (0.04 km^{2})
- Elevation: 2,172 ft (662 m)

Population (2020)
  - Total: 102
  - Density: 6.4/sq mi (2.48/km^{2})
- Time zone: UTC-6 (Central (CST))
  - Summer (DST): UTC-5 (CDT)
- ZIP codes: 73666
- FIPS code: 40-71900
- GNIS feature ID: 2413357

Sweetwater is a town in Beckham and Roger Mills Counties in the U.S. state of Oklahoma.

== History ==
It was incorporated in 1998.

Named for nearby Sweetwater Creek, the town is at the junction of State Highway 30 and State Highway 152. Sweetwater originated around the time of the Cheyenne-Arapaho land opening in 1892. A post office for Sweetwater was established September 27, 1894 (current zip code 73666). By 1910, the community had an estimated population of 50, two general stores, a dry goods–grocery store, a cotton gin, and a fuel company. The residents expected the construction of a railroad through the area, but none was built, which limited further growth. The town did expand to about 100 people around the time of World War I, based on being an agricultural service center for the surrounding township, and the postmaster estimated 150 in the 1930s. However, the population started a decline even before World War II, as improved roads and automobile transportation carried business south to Erick or east to Elk City.

On May 5, 2007, a tornado, rated EF3 on the enhanced Fujita scale, traveled on a path around 100 to 150 yards (91 to 137 m) wide and 7.5 miles (12.1 km) long. It began about 2.5 miles (4.0 km) south of Sweetwater and ended roughly 5 miles (8 km) north of Sweetwater, following State Highway 30. EF3 wind speeds range from 136 to 165 miles per hour (219 to 266 km/h). It severely damaged several buildings in the town, including the church and high school, and destroyed eight homes.

== Demographics ==
=== 2020 census ===
As of the 2020 census, Sweetwater had a population of 102. The median age was 35.3 years. 35.3% of residents were under the age of 18 and 15.7% of residents were 65 years of age or older. For every 100 females there were 82.1 males, and for every 100 females age 18 and over there were 83.3 males age 18 and over.

0.0% of residents lived in urban areas, while 100.0% lived in rural areas.

There were 39 households in Sweetwater, of which 46.2% had children under the age of 18 living in them. Of all households, 46.2% were married-couple households, 12.8% were households with a male householder and no spouse or partner present, and 28.2% were households with a female householder and no spouse or partner present. About 20.5% of all households were made up of individuals and 7.7% had someone living alone who was 65 years of age or older.

There were 46 housing units, of which 15.2% were vacant. The homeowner vacancy rate was 0.0% and the rental vacancy rate was 11.1%.

Racial composition as of the 2020 census
Race	Number	Percent
White	90	88.2%
Black or African American	0	0.0%
American Indian and Alaska Native	0	0.0%
Asian	0	0.0%
Native Hawaiian and Other Pacific Islander	0	0.0%
Some other race	2	2.0%
Two or more races	10	9.8%
Hispanic or Latino (of any race)	9	8.8%

=== 2010 census ===
As of the 2010 census, Sweetwater had a population of 87.

== Education ==
The Sweetwater Public School District, which covers the town, is one of the smallest public school districts in Oklahoma. For 2007, it tied with Boley for the smallest high school with 15 students. For a combined district, K-12, Sweetwater finished third behind Boley (51) and Clarita (58), with 60 students.

== Transportation ==
Oklahoma State Highway 6 and 152 run concurrently east-west through the town. Oklahoma State Highway 30 runs north-south through town. The Texas border is just to the west.

Hobart Regional Airport (KHBR, or FAA ID: HBR) is about 74 miles southeast. It features two paved runways, the largest 5507' by 100'.

The nearest major airport to Sweetwater with commercial connections is Rick Husband Amarillo International Airport, about 125 miles to the west.
