= Reydon, Oklahoma =

- Town
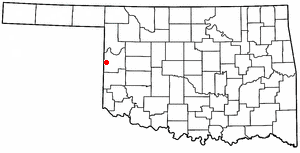
- Location of Reydon, Oklahoma
- Coordinates: 35°38′59″N 99°55′25″W
- Country: United States
- State: Oklahoma
- County: Roger Mills
- Established: 1928

Area
  - Total: 0.49 sq mi (1.28 km^{2})
  - Land: 0.49 sq mi (1.28 km^{2})
  - Water: 0 sq mi (0.00 km^{2})
- Elevation: 2,261 ft (689 m)

Population (2020)
  - Total: 137
  - Density: 277.6/sq mi (107.19/km^{2})
- Time zone: UTC-6 (Central (CST))
  - Summer (DST): UTC-5 (CDT)
- ZIP code: 73660
- Area code: 580
- FIPS code: 40-63100
- GNIS feature ID: 2412546

Reydon is a town in Roger Mills County, Oklahoma, United States.

Reydon was established in 1928 after the Atchison, Topeka and Santa Fe Railway put down rails in the area, purchased land from local farmers, and laid out a townsite. The site was two miles north of a settlement called Rankin, and Rankin merchants moved to the site because of the rail connection. However, the name “Rankin” was considered confusing because Rankin, Texas was also along the railline. So the town was named Reydon instead, either in honor of a railroad executive in Chicago, or in honor of the village of Reydon in Suffolk County, England.

The population of the town peaked at 331 in 1950. In December 2003 the New York Times featured Reydon on the front page, in an article regarding dwindling small towns on the Great Plains. The population was 137 at the time of the 2020 census.

== Geography ==
According to the United States Census Bureau, the town has a total area of 0.4 square miles (1.0 km^{2}), all land.

Reydon is located at the northern intersection of State Highways 30 and 47.

Reydon is surrounded by the Black Kettle National Grassland, with Skipout Lake to the southeast.

== Demographics ==
Historical population
| Census | Pop. | Note | %± |
|---|---|---|---|
| 1930 | 216 | | — |
| 1940 | 311 | | 44.0% |
| 1950 | 331 | | 6.4% |
| 1960 | 183 | | −44.7% |
| 1970 | 215 | | 17.5% |
| 1980 | 252 | | 17.2% |
| 1990 | 200 | | −20.6% |
| 2000 | 177 | | −11.5% |
| 2010 | 210 | | 18.6% |
| 2020 | 137 | | −34.8% |
U.S. Decennial Census

=== 2020 census ===
As of the 2020 census, Reydon had a population of 137. The median age was 35.4 years. 33.6% of residents were under the age of 18 and 16.8% of residents were 65 years of age or older. For every 100 females there were 73.4 males, and for every 100 females age 18 and over there were 78.4 males age 18 and over.

0.0% of residents lived in urban areas, while 100.0% lived in rural areas.

There were 57 households in Reydon, of which 42.1% had children under the age of 18 living in them. Of all households, 36.8% were married-couple households, 14.0% were households with a male householder and no spouse or partner present, and 40.4% were households with a female householder and no spouse or partner present. About 26.3% of all households were made up of individuals and 10.6% had someone living alone who was 65 years of age or older.

There were 110 housing units, of which 48.2% were vacant. The homeowner vacancy rate was 3.3% and the rental vacancy rate was 39.1%.

Racial composition as of the 2020 census
| Race | Number | Percent |
|---|---|---|
| White | 115 | 83.9% |
| Black or African American | 0 | 0.0% |
| American Indian and Alaska Native | 2 | 1.5% |
| Asian | 0 | 0.0% |
| Native Hawaiian and Other Pacific Islander | 0 | 0.0% |
| Some other race | 1 | 0.7% |
| Two or more races | 19 | 13.9% |
| Hispanic or Latino (of any race) | 11 | 8.0% |

=== 2000 census ===
As of the 2000 census, there were 177 people, 77 households, and 46 families residing in the town. The population density was 398.9 inhabitants per square mile (154.0/km^{2}). There were 102 housing units at an average density of 229.9 per square mile (88.8/km^{2}). The racial makeup of the town was 98.31% White, 0.56% African American, 0.56% Native American, and 0.56% from two or more races. Hispanic or Latino of any race were 3.95% of the population.

There were 77 households, out of which 32.5% had children under the age of 18 living with them, 46.8% were married couples living together, 11.7% had a female householder with no husband present, and 39.0% were non-families. 37.7% of all households were made up of individuals, and 23.4% had someone living alone who was 65 years of age or older. The average household size was 2.30 and the average family size was 3.02.

In the town, the population was spread out, with 27.7% under the age of 18, 6.2% from 18 to 24, 24.9% from 25 to 44, 27.1% from 45 to 64, and 14.1% who were 65 years of age or older. The median age was 39 years. For every 100 females, there were 84.4 males. For every 100 females age 18 and over, there were 80.3 males.

The median income for a household in the town was $25,750, and the median income for a family was $30,000. Males had a median income of $19,583 versus $23,438 for females. The per capita income for the town was $16,721. None of the families and 11.2% of the population were living below the poverty line, including no under eighteens and 36.0% of those over 64.

== Education ==
It is in the Reydon Public Schools school district.
