= Rankin, Oklahoma =

- Unincorporated community
- Location within Oklahoma Location within the United States
- Coordinates: 35°37′28″N 99°55′28″W
- Country: United States
- State: Oklahoma
- County: Roger Mills
- Elevation: 2,408 ft (734 m)
- Time zone: UTC-6 (Central (CST))
  - Summer (DST): UTC-5 (CDT)
- Area code: 580
- GNIS feature ID: 1101610

Rankin is an unincorporated community in Roger Mills County, Oklahoma, United States. It is about 16 miles west of Cheyenne on Oklahoma State Highway 47.

== History ==
The locale is old enough to appear on a 1911 Rand McNally map of the county. But the settlement's standing was lost in 1928 after the Atchison, Topeka and Santa Fe Railway built its rail line along Rush Creek two miles north, and town merchants moved to that location — which became the new town of Reydon — to be next to the tracks.

== Notable people ==
- Bessie S. McColgin (1875-1972), Oklahoma politician and businesswoman
