= Roll, Oklahoma =

Roll
- Unincorporated community
- Location within the state of Oklahoma Roll (the United States)
- Coordinates: 35°46′45″N 99°42′41″W
- Country: United States
- State: Oklahoma
- County: Roger Mills
- Elevation: 2,270 ft (690 m)
- Time zone: UTC-6 (Central (CST))
  - Summer (DST): UTC-5 (CDT)
- GNIS feature ID: 1101637

Roll is an unincorporated community located in Roger Mills County, Oklahoma, United States. The community is on U.S. Highway 283 at the junction with State Highway 47. Cheyenne lies approximately 11 miles to the south along Route 283. The Canadian River is about six miles to the north.

== History ==
Founded in old Day County, the post office was opened December 9, 1903. It closed August 31, 1920.
