= Durham, Oklahoma =

Durham
- Unincorporated community
- Location within the state of Oklahoma Durham (the United States)
- Coordinates: 35°50′34″N 99°55′35″W
- Country: United States
- State: Oklahoma
- County: Roger Mills

Area
  - Total: 0.23 sq mi (0.59 km^{2})
  - Land: 0.23 sq mi (0.59 km^{2})
  - Water: 0 sq mi (0.00 km^{2})
- Elevation: 2,461 ft (750 m)

Population (2020)
  - Total: 21
  - Density: 92/sq mi (35.6/km^{2})
- Time zone: UTC-6 (Central (CST))
  - Summer (DST): UTC-5 (CDT)
- ZIP codes: 73642
- FIPS code: 40-22100
- GNIS feature ID: 2805313

Durham is a rural unincorporated community in Roger Mills County, Oklahoma, United States. As of the 2020 census, Durham had a population of 21. It lies along State Highway 30, four miles south of the Antelope Hills and the Canadian River. The Oklahoma-Texas border is four miles to the west.

The post office opened May 15, 1902. Durham was named for the first postmaster, Doris Durham Morris.

== Break O' Day Farm & Metcalfe Museum ==
The homestead of Western artist Augusta Metcalfe is in Durham, and is now the Break O' Day Farm & Metcalfe Museum, which is on the National Register of Historic Places listings in Roger Mills County, Oklahoma. Metcalfe's paintings, as well as the work of contemporary regional artists, are displayed. The homestead also provides insights into one family’s life in Oklahoma Territory and beyond.

The Antelope Hills, north of Durham, are also NRHP-listed.

== Demographics ==
Historical population
Census	Pop.	Note	%±
2020	21		—
U.S. Decennial Census

=== 2020 census ===
As of the 2020 census, Durham had a population of 21. The median age was 21.8 years. 38.1% of residents were under the age of 18 and 33.3% of residents were 65 years of age or older. For every 100 females there were 75.0 males, and for every 100 females age 18 and over there were 116.7 males age 18 and over.

0.0% of residents lived in urban areas, while 100.0% lived in rural areas.

There were 10 households in Durham, of which 20.0% had children under the age of 18 living in them. Of all households, 60.0% were married-couple households, 0.0% were households with a male householder and no spouse or partner present, and 40.0% were households with a female householder and no spouse or partner present. About 40.0% of all households were made up of individuals and 40.0% had someone living alone who was 65 years of age or older.

There were 13 housing units, of which 23.1% were vacant. The homeowner vacancy rate was 25.0% and the rental vacancy rate was 0.0%.

Racial composition as of the 2020 census
Race	Number	Percent
White	17	81.0%
Black or African American	0	0.0%
American Indian and Alaska Native	1	4.8%
Asian	0	0.0%
Native Hawaiian and Other Pacific Islander	1	4.8%
Some other race	0	0.0%
Two or more races	2	9.5%
Hispanic or Latino (of any race)	1	4.8%

== Education ==
It is in the Reydon Public Schools school district.
