= Dorroh-Trent House =

- U.S. National Register of Historic Places
- Location within Oklahoma
- Location: 11th and Conley Sts., Hammon, Oklahoma
- Coordinates: 35°38′07″N 99°22′37″W
- Area: less than one acre
- Built: 1910
- NRHP reference No.: 79002026
- Added to NRHP: October 3, 1979

The Dorroh-Trent House, at 11th and Conley Streets in Hammon, Oklahoma, was built in 1910. It was listed on the National Register of Historic Places in 1979.

It is a wood-frame construction building, apparently deemed significant for association with Dr. Lee Dorrah, who was in 1910 "appointed physician for the Red Moon Indian Agency and from that time on was a vigorous champion of the Cheyenne and Arapaho peoples and a vocal advocate for their rights. He was appointed local surgeon for the Clinton, Oklahoma and Western Railway Company."
