= Roger Mills County, Oklahoma =

County in Oklahoma, United States

- County
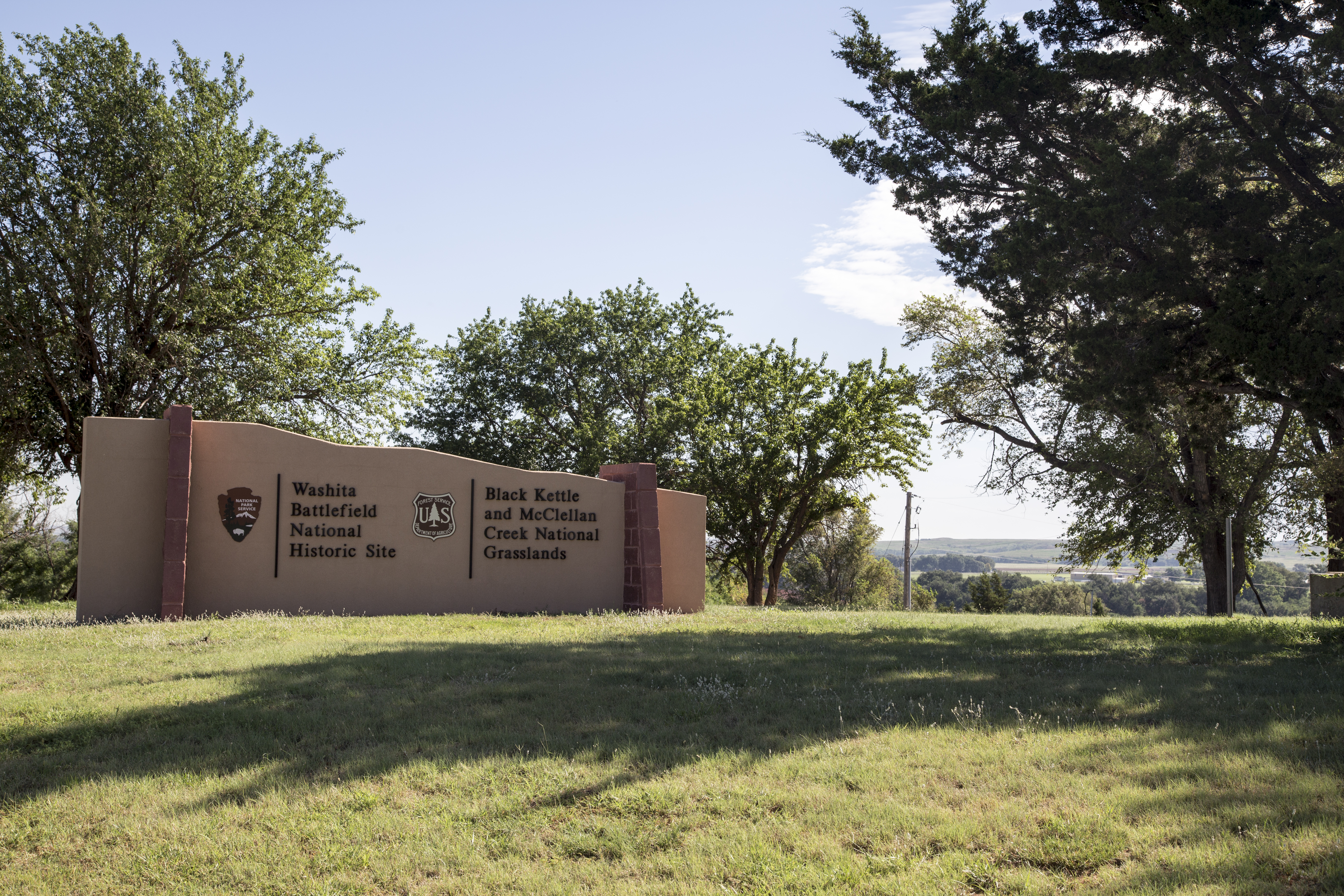
- Washita Battlefield National Historic Site

- Location within the U.S. state of Oklahoma
- Coordinates: 35°41′N 99°42′W
- Country: United States
- State: Oklahoma
- Founded: 1891
- Named for: Roger Q. Mills
- Seat: Cheyenne
- Largest town: Cheyenne

Area
  - Total: 1,146 sq mi (2,970 km^{2})
  - Land: 1,141 sq mi (2,960 km^{2})
  - Water: 5.3 sq mi (14 km^{2}) 0.40%

Population (2020)
  - Total: 3,442
  - Estimate (2025): 3,259 ▼
  - Density: 3.017/sq mi (1.165/km^{2})
- Time zone: UTC−6 (Central)
  - Summer (DST): UTC−5 (CDT)
- Congressional district: 3rd
- Website: www.rogermills.org

Roger Mills County is a county located in the western part of the U.S. state of Oklahoma. As of the 2020 census, its population was 3,442, making it the fourth-least populous county in Oklahoma. Its county seat is Cheyenne. The county was created in 1891.

Roger Mills county is located above the petroleum-rich Panhandle-Hugoton Field, making it one of the leading sources of oil, natural gas, and helium. The county also overlies part of the Ogallala Aquifer.

== History ==
Roger Mills County takes its name from Roger Q. Mills, an officer in the Confederate States Army during the American Civil War and later senator from Texas. The town of Cheyenne in Roger Mills County is the location of the Battle of Washita River (also called Battle of the Washita; Washita Battlefield and the Washita Massacre), where George Armstrong Custer’s 7th U.S. Cavalry attacked Chief Black Kettle’s Cheyenne village on the Washita River on November 26, 1868.

The area covered by Roger Mills County had been part of the Cheyenne Arapaho reservation until after Oklahoma Territory was created and County E was formed. County E was renamed Day County. Day County was abolished and Roger Mills County was created at statehood on November 16, 1907. The county's western boundary with Texas was moved eastward 3,800 feet (1,200 m) when the Supreme Court ruled that the 100th Meridian was farther east than originally supposed.

During the 1970s, Roger Mills County and the surrounding area were the site of natural gas and oil development in the Panhandle-Hugoton Gas Field, the largest-volume gas field in the United States, and the world's largest known source of helium. Between 1973 and 1993, the field produced over 8 trillion cubic feet (230,000,000 m^{3}) of natural gas.

== Geography ==
According to the U.S. Census Bureau, the county has a total area of 1,146 square miles (2,970 km^{2}), of which 5.3 sq mi (14 km^{2}) (0.5%) are covered by water. The Canadian River forms the northern border of the county. The Washita River passes by Cheyenne and Strong City as it crosses the county from west to east. The historically significant Antelope Hills lie in the northeastern part of the county.

=== Major highways ===
- U.S. Highway 283
- State Highway 6
- State Highway 30
- State Highway 33
- State Highway 34
- State Highway 47
- State Highway 47A
- State Highway 152

=== Adjacent counties ===
- Ellis County (north)
- Dewey County (northeast)
- Custer County (east)
- Beckham County (south)
- Wheeler County, Texas (southwest)
- Hemphill County, Texas (northwest)

=== National protected areas ===
- Antelope Hills
- Black Kettle National Grassland (part)
- Break O'Day Farm
- Washita Battlefield National Historic Site

== Demographics ==
Historical population
Census	Pop.	Note	%±
1900	6,190		—
1910	12,861		107.8%
1920	10,638		−17.3%
1930	14,744		38.6%
1940	10,736		−27.2%
1950	7,395		−31.1%
1960	5,090		−31.2%
1970	4,452		−12.5%
1980	4,799		7.8%
1990	4,147		−13.6%
2000	3,436		−17.1%
2010	3,647		6.1%
2020	3,442		−5.6%
2025 (est.)	3,259	▼	−5.3%
U.S. Decennial Census; 1790-1960 1900-1990; 1990-2000 2010

=== 2020 census ===
As of the 2020 United States census, the county had a population of 3,442. Of the residents, 24.9% were under the age of 18 and 20.2% were 65 years of age or older; the median age was 43.1 years. For every 100 females there were 98.4 males, and for every 100 females age 18 and over there were 98.5 males.

The racial makeup of the county was 85.6% White, 0.2% Black or African American, 3.5% American Indian and Alaska Native, 0.1% Asian, 1.8% from some other race, and 8.7% from two or more races. Hispanic or Latino residents of any race comprised 7.4% of the population.

There were 1,397 households in the county, of which 30.6% had children under the age of 18 living with them and 21.5% had a female householder with no spouse or partner present. About 25.6% of all households were made up of individuals and 12.6% had someone living alone who was 65 years of age or older.

There were 1,852 housing units, of which 24.6% were vacant. Among occupied housing units, 80.2% were owner-occupied and 19.8% were renter-occupied. The homeowner vacancy rate was 2.8% and the rental vacancy rate was 17.2%.

=== 2000 census ===
As of the 2000 census, 3,436 people, 1,428 households, and 988 families resided in the county. The population density was 1/km^{2} (2.6/mi^{2}). The 1,749 housing units had an average density of 1/km^{2} (2.6/mi^{2}).

The racial makeup of the county was 91.76% White, 0.29% African American, 5.47% Native American, 0.09% Asian, 0.52% from other races, and 1.86% from two or more races. About 2.65% of the population were Hispanics or Latinos of any race.

Of the 1,428 households, 29.4% had children under 18 living with them, 58.8% were married couples living together, 6.8% had a female householder with no husband present, and 30.8% were not families. About 28.6% of all households were made up of individuals, and 16.9% had someone living alone who was 65 or older. The average household size was 2.38 and the average family size was 2.91.

In the county, the age distribution was 23.8% under 18, 6.7% from 18 to 24, 24.7% from 25 to 44, 26.0% from 45 to 64, and 18.7% who were 65 or older. The median age was 42 years. For every 100 females there were 100.5 males. For every 100 females 18 and over, there were 96.9 males.

The median income for a household in the county was $30,078, and for a family was $35,921. Males had a median income of $22,224 versus $19,821 for females. The per capita income for the county was $16,821. About 11.50% of families and 16.30% of the population were below the poverty line, including 20.40% of those under age 18 and 10.40% of those 65 or over.

== Economy ==
The county economy has depended on agriculture, which has benefitted because it lies above the Ogallala Aquifer. Principal crops have included kaffir corn, broomcorn, wheat, cotton, corn, and alfalfa. Farms have been consolidating throughout the period since the Great Depression. In 1930, the 2,353 farms averaged 278.3 acres each. By 2000, the remaining 680 farms averaged 1,015.54 acres each.

Petroleum and natural gas production has become an important contributor since discovery of the Panhandle-Hugoton Field.

In 2010, Roger Mills County had a per capita income of $28,427 per resident compared to the United States per capita income of $27,334. The county had the highest per capita income of any in Oklahoma and was the only Oklahoma county in which the per capita income exceeded the national per capita income.

== Politics ==
Roger Mills County is heavily Republican, like most of rural western Oklahoma. It has voted for the Republican candidate in every presidential election since 1980, and in all but three elections since 1952. The county last voted for a Democrat in 1976 when it voted for Jimmy Carter. Roger Mills County, prior to the 1980s, had leaned Democratic, voting Democratic in 12 of 18 elections between 1908 and 1976. Since 1976, it has rapidly trended Republican.

Voter Registration and Party Enrollment as of June 30, 2023
Party	Number of Voters	Percentage
Democratic	564	24.32%
Republican	1,549	66.80%
Others	206	8.88%
Total	2,319	100%

United States presidential election results for Roger Mills County, Oklahoma
Year	Republican		Democratic		Third party(ies)	
Year	No.	%	No.	%	No.	%
1908	839	34.71%	1,168	48.32%	410	16.96%
1912	716	32.80%	902	41.32%	565	25.88%
1916	538	23.79%	1,148	50.77%	575	25.43%
1920	1,193	46.75%	931	36.48%	428	16.77%
1924	946	33.99%	1,318	47.36%	519	18.65%
1928	1,948	63.51%	986	32.15%	133	4.34%
1932	511	12.29%	3,648	87.71%	0	0.00%
1936	989	22.33%	3,383	76.38%	57	1.29%
1940	1,504	36.63%	2,580	62.83%	22	0.54%
1944	1,148	36.15%	2,015	63.44%	13	0.41%
1948	509	18.96%	2,176	81.04%	0	0.00%
1952	1,667	52.99%	1,479	47.01%	0	0.00%
1956	1,072	43.95%	1,367	56.05%	0	0.00%
1960	1,463	64.39%	809	35.61%	0	0.00%
1964	926	40.77%	1,345	59.23%	0	0.00%
1968	1,102	45.31%	720	29.61%	610	25.08%
1972	1,696	78.16%	420	19.35%	54	2.49%
1976	873	38.92%	1,346	60.01%	24	1.07%
1980	1,221	56.24%	877	40.40%	73	3.36%
1984	1,550	69.10%	680	30.32%	13	0.58%
1988	1,132	56.26%	866	43.04%	14	0.70%
1992	890	40.96%	767	35.30%	516	23.75%
1996	959	49.61%	733	37.92%	241	12.47%
2000	1,234	73.15%	441	26.14%	12	0.71%
2004	1,388	78.42%	382	21.58%	0	0.00%
2008	1,502	83.96%	287	16.04%	0	0.00%
2012	1,402	83.75%	272	16.25%	0	0.00%
2016	1,547	87.95%	151	8.58%	61	3.47%
2020	1,629	88.82%	168	9.16%	37	2.02%
2024	1,548	89.32%	160	9.23%	25	1.44%

== Communities ==
=== Towns ===
- Cheyenne (county seat)
- Hammon (small part in Custer County)
- Reydon
- Strong City
- Sweetwater (partially in Beckham County)

=== Unincorporated communities ===
- Berlin
- Crawford
- Durham (also a census-designated place)
- Grimes
- Rankin
- Roll

== Education ==
School districts include:

- Cheyenne Public Schools
- Elk City Public Schools
- Hammon Public Schools
- Leedey Public Schools
- Merritt Public Schools
- Reydon Public Schools
- Sayre Public Schools
- Sweetwater Public Schools

== See also ==
- National Register of Historic Places listings in Roger Mills County, Oklahoma
