= Thomas, Oklahoma =

- City
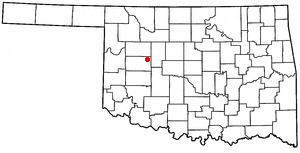
- Location of Thomas, Oklahoma
- Coordinates: 35°44′43″N 98°44′42″W
- Country: United States
- State: Oklahoma
- County: Custer

Area
  - Total: 1.15 sq mi (2.98 km^{2})
  - Land: 1.15 sq mi (2.98 km^{2})
  - Water: 0 sq mi (0.00 km^{2})
- Elevation: 1,745 ft (532 m)

Population (2020)
  - Total: 1,143
  - Density: 994.5/sq mi (383.97/km^{2})
- Time zone: UTC-6 (Central (CST))
  - Summer (DST): UTC-5 (CDT)
- ZIP code: 73669
- Area code: 580
- FIPS code: 40-73450
- GNIS feature ID: 2412061
- Website: thecityofthomas.org

Thomas is a city in Custer County, Oklahoma, United States. As of the 2020 census, Thomas had a population of 1,143.

== History ==
Thomas was named for William Thomas, who owned a general store and served as postmaster, when the first post office was established at the store on February 12, 1894, while this area was part of Oklahoma Territory. Joseph W. Morris claimed a homestead at the site during the Cheyenne-Arapaho opening in 1892. The Oklahoma Railway Townsite platted Morris' land in 1902, the same year that the Blackwell, Enid and Southwestern Railroad (later the St. Louis and San Francisco Railway) constructed a line through Thomas. In 1906, the Kansas City, Mexico and Orient Railway (later the Atchison, Topeka and Santa Fe Railway) also built a line through the town. Most of the early settlers were members of the Amish, the Dunkards, and the Church of the United Brethren in Christ religious groups.

== Geography ==
According to the United States Census Bureau, the city has a total area of 1.2 square miles (3.1 km^{2}), all land.

== Demographics ==
Historical population
Census	Pop.	Note	%±
1910	1,371		—
1920	1,223		−10.8%
1930	1,256		2.7%
1940	1,220		−2.9%
1950	1,171		−4.0%
1960	1,211		3.4%
1970	1,336		10.3%
1980	1,515		13.4%
1990	1,246		−17.8%
2000	1,238		−0.6%
2010	1,181		−4.6%
2020	1,143		−3.2%
U.S. Decennial Census

=== 2020 census ===
As of the 2020 census, Thomas had a population of 1,143. The median age was 37.5 years. 29.0% of residents were under the age of 18 and 17.1% of residents were 65 years of age or older. For every 100 females there were 97.4 males, and for every 100 females age 18 and over there were 88.4 males age 18 and over.

0% of residents lived in urban areas, while 100.0% lived in rural areas.

There were 461 households in Thomas, of which 35.8% had children under the age of 18 living in them. Of all households, 47.7% were married-couple households, 18.9% were households with a male householder and no spouse or partner present, and 28.0% were households with a female householder and no spouse or partner present. About 31.2% of all households were made up of individuals and 16.3% had someone living alone who was 65 years of age or older.

There were 550 housing units, of which 16.2% were vacant. Among occupied housing units, 75.7% were owner-occupied and 24.3% were renter-occupied. The homeowner vacancy rate was 1.9% and the rental vacancy rate was 18.2%.

Racial composition as of the 2020 census
Race	Percent
White	80.3%
Black or African American	0.3%
American Indian and Alaska Native	7.9%
Asian	0.1%
Native Hawaiian and Other Pacific Islander	0%
Some other race	1.6%
Two or more races	9.8%
Hispanic or Latino (of any race)	6.7%

=== 2000 census ===
As of the 2000 census, there were 1,238 people, 486 households, and 337 families residing in the city. The population density was 1,041.8 inhabitants per square mile (402.2/km^{2}). There were 596 housing units at an average density of 501.5 per square mile (193.6/km^{2}). The racial makeup of the city was 88.85% White, 0.08% African American, 8.08% Native American, 0.57% from other races, and 2.42% from two or more races. Hispanic or Latino of any race were 1.70% of the population.

There were 486 households, out of which 31.7% had children under the age of 18 living with them, 56.4% were married couples living together, 10.3% had a female householder with no husband present, and 30.5% were non-families. 28.6% of all households were made up of individuals, and 14.8% had someone living alone who was 65 years of age or older. The average household size was 2.43 and the average family size was 2.99.

In the city, the population was spread out, with 25.8% under the age of 18, 6.9% from 18 to 24, 23.5% from 25 to 44, 21.1% from 45 to 64, and 22.6% who were 65 years of age or older. The median age was 41 years. For every 100 females, there were 91.0 males. For every 100 females age 18 and over, there were 83.6 males.

The median income for a household in the city was $30,083, and the median income for a family was $36,667. Males had a median income of $30,000 versus $17,440 for females. The per capita income for the city was $15,693. About 13.0% of families and 17.2% of the population were below the poverty line, including 25.7% of those under age 18 and 18.2% of those age 65 or over.

== Economy ==
Originally a marketing community and shipping point for the surrounding agricultural area, Thomas has evolved into a bedroom community. According to the Encyclopedia of Oklahoma History and Culture, Over 91 percent of the employed residents commute to work in other communities.

The oil refinery at Thomas is one of only five refineries that was operating in Oklahoma in 2015. Formerly known as the Barrett Refinery and opened in 1982, this facility has a rated capacity of 14,000 barrels per day. In the oil industry, a barrel (Bbl) is equal to 42 U. S. gallons. Hence, this is now the smallest refinery operating in the state. After the Barrett Company declared bankruptcy, the refinery was scheduled to close permanently on December 22, 2005. Instead, an Oklahoma City firm, Ventura Refining and Transmission, LLC. Revival of the refinery was expected to open up about 30 to 50 new local jobs, excluding personnel needed to drive about 30 trucks handling product deliveries per day.

== Government ==
The city of Thomas has an aldermanic form of government.

The mayor of Thomas is Jeff Gose.

== Media ==
The Thomas Tribune was first published weekly in 1902, and is still being published. It has an online edition.

== Education ==
It is in the Thomas-Fay-Custer Unified Schools school district.

Previously Thomas had its own school district. In 1989, the district's enrollment was 400.
