= Washita Battlefield National Historic Site =

National Historic Site of the United States

- Washita Battlefield
- U.S. National Register of Historic Places
- U.S. National Historic Landmark
- U.S. National Historic Site
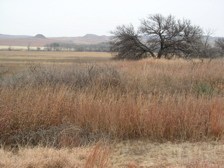
- Washita Battlefield

- Location within Oklahoma Location within the United States
- Nearest city: Cheyenne, Oklahoma
- Coordinates: 35°37′3″N 99°42′1″W
- Area: 7,680 acres (12.00 sq mi; 31.1 km^{2})
- Visitation: 11,048 (2025)
- Website: Washita Battlefield National Historic Site
- NRHP reference No.: 66000633

Significant dates
- Added to NRHP: October 15, 1966
- Designated NHL: January 12, 1965

Washita Battlefield National Historic Site protects and interprets the site of the Southern Cheyenne village of Chief Black Kettle where the Battle of Washita occurred. The site is located about 150 miles (241 km) west of Oklahoma City, Oklahoma, near Cheyenne, Oklahoma. Just before dawn on November 27, 1868, the village was attacked by the 7th U.S. Cavalry under Lt. Col. George Custer. In the Battle of Washita, the Cheyenne suffered large numbers of casualties. The strike was hailed at the time by the military and many civilians as a significant victory aimed at reducing Indian raids on frontier settlements as it forced the Cheyenne back to the reservation set aside for them. The site is a small portion of a large area that was declared a National Historic Landmark in 1965, and was listed on the National Register of Historic Places in 1966. The landmarked area encompasses the entire battlefield, which extends for some 6 miles (9.7 km) through the city of Cheyenne.

== Description ==
Washita Battlefield National Historic Site
- Interactive map of Washita Battlefield National Historic Site
- Established: November 12, 1996
- Visitors: 14,215 (in 2004)

The Washita Battlefield National Historic Site is located a few miles west of the town of Cheyenne, on the north side of Oklahoma State Highway 47. The main body of the site is located between SR 47A and the Washita River, with the visitor center located near the junction of 47 and 47A. It is completely surrounded by the Black Kettle National Grassland and consists mainly of open prairie, with strips of trees in the riparian area of the river. Trails lead from the parking area on 47A through the park. The visitor center features exhibits about the battle, the soldiers, and the Cheyenne, as well as a film and a bookstore.

The area that the historic site encompasses is part of a 315.2-acre memorial associated with the 1868 Battle of Washita River. Landscape areas mainly to the east, north, and south include ridge lines that were the areas from which Custer's attack was launched. Portions of the battlefield extend into Cheyenne and have been compromised by the construction of roads and railroads through the area. The historic site includes one of the largest and best-preserved tracts, including the village of the Cheyenne, which was the focal point of the battle.

== See also ==
- List of National Historic Landmarks in Oklahoma
- National Register of Historic Places listings in Roger Mills County, Oklahoma
