= Cheyenne, Oklahoma =

- Town
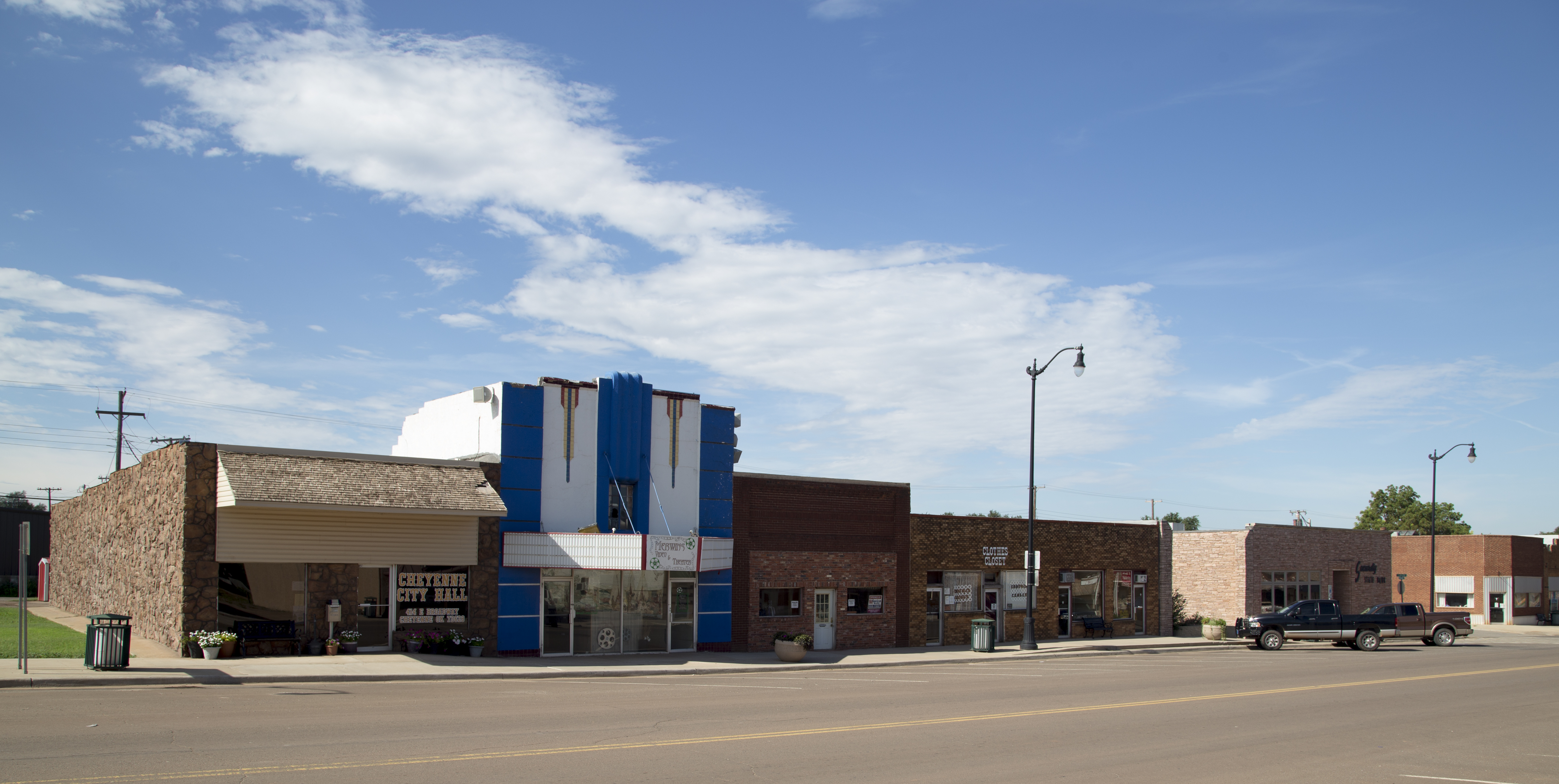
- Cheyenne town center

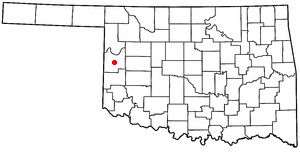
- Location of Cheyenne, Oklahoma
- Coordinates: 35°36′39″N 99°40′35″W
- Country: United States
- State: Oklahoma
- County: Roger Mills

Area
  - Total: 0.99 sq mi (2.56 km^{2})
  - Land: 0.99 sq mi (2.56 km^{2})
  - Water: 0 sq mi (0.00 km^{2})
- Elevation: 1,946 ft (593 m)

Population (2020)
  - Total: 771
  - Density: 781/sq mi (301.4/km^{2})
- Time zone: UTC-6 (Central (CST))
  - Summer (DST): UTC-5 (CDT)
- ZIP code: 73628
- Area code: 580
- FIPS code: 40-13900
- GNIS feature ID: 2413196

Cheyenne is a town in Roger Mills County, Oklahoma, United States. As of the 2020 census, the town's population was 771. It is the county seat of Roger Mills County.

== History ==
Cheyenne is the location of the Battle of Washita River (also called Battle of the Washita; Washita Battlefield; Washita Massacre), where George Armstrong Custer's 7th U.S. Cavalry attacked the sleeping Cheyenne village of Black Kettle on the Washita River on November 26, 1868.

Cheyenne has been a county seat since 1895. But construction of the nearest railroad into the area, the Clinton and Oklahoma Western Railway ("C&OW") terminated in 1912 at Strong City, and that township was laid out with a rocky knoll in the center reserved for the County Courthouse should Strong City become the county seat instead of Cheyenne. To keep their town's position, the citizens of Cheyenne responded by building the Cheyenne Short Line Railroad up the Washita River valley to Strong City to connect to the C&OW. In 1914 the courthouse in Cheyenne burned down, and the fear again arose in Cheyenne that the citizens of Strong City would manage to have the new courthouse built there. But Cheyenne came up with the funding, and a new two-story brick courthouse was constructed in that town. Strong City remained a competitor for a while, and in 1932 managed to route a state highway (Oklahoma State Highway 33) through the locale, thus missing Cheyenne. But in the 1930s several business houses relocated from Strong City to Cheyenne, losing that town population and businesses while Cheyenne grew during the decade.

During the 1970s Cheyenne and the surrounding area benefited from the natural gas and oil development in the Panhandle-Hugoton field, the largest-volume gas field in the United States, and the world's largest known source of helium. Between 1973 and 1993 the field produced over eight trillion cubic feet (230,000,000 m^{3}) of gas.

=== 1985–1987 Lady Bears ===
The Cheyenne High School girls six-on-six basketball team of 1985-1986-1987 won three straight state Class A titles going 88–4 over that time, including winning their last 42 games. Prior to the 1985 season, the team had won only two district titles in 20 years, and had never been to the state tournament. The 42-game streak included the last half of the 1986 season and all of the 1987 season, going 30–0. The four losses were by a combined 5 total points. After winning their third straight title, the Lady Bears (coached by David Sanders) tied a record that stood for 49 years, held by Byng, 1936–1937–1938.

For their first title in 1985 Cheyenne went 29–2, including winning their final 23 games, and defeated Lookeba-Sickles, 45–42, in the championship. The following season they shot 73.0% from the field for the year, went 29–2 again, and beat Amber-Pocasset 61–49 in the championship game. In the final championship game of the three-year run, the undefeated Bears beat the 1980s best Class A team, the Thomas Terrierettes, 65–42.

Cheyenne was led by Jodi Fisher (26.7 points per game), Cindy Smith, Jenny Shockey, Leana Burrows, and Sherry Hillman (also contributing one season each to the three-year run: Julie Barton—1985, Lori Sanders—1987, and Cindy Hay—1987). Fisher, Hillman, Burrows were named to the 1985 and 1986 Class A Girls All-Tournament team. In the first round of the 1986 finals Fisher scored 52 points against Macomb, setting an Oklahoma state girls basketball tournament's single-game scoring record. Fisher ended the three state tournament games with 121 points, needing just eight more to tie Thomas's Kelli Litsch's tournament point record, and was named to the 1986 Class A Girls All-Tournament 1st Team. Fisher was also named to The Daily Oklahoman's "Super 6" team for 1987, and coach Sanders was named the 6-on-6 "Coach of the Year" that same season.

B.C. Scouting Service rated Fisher as the top women's basketball recruit in the state of Oklahoma for the 1987 season and she was named an All-American honorable mention by USA Today. For the 1987 Class A Girls All-Tournament 1st Team Cheyenne had three of the six selections, forwards Jodi Fisher and Cindy Smith, and guard Cindy Hay (Thomas had two, forward Staci Litsch [scored 100 points in three state tournament games and is Kelli's little sister] and guard Deena Garner; Johnna Ellis, of Tupelo received the other selection).

Fisher went on to play for the Oklahoma State Cowgirls where she tied a school record for career games played with 124 (with Lisa McGill and Liz Brown), she also set the OSU record for field-goal percentage in a season with 61.3% in the 1990–91 season. She left OSU ranked second in block shots (77), number eight on the all-time rebound list (525), 16th in field goals made with 334, collected 113 career steals from 1987 to 1991 (18th), 20th in career assists (150), and 823 career points (20th on the school's all-time scoring list). She tied a school record for rebounds by an individual in an NCAA Tournament game with 12 against DePaul in the opening round game in 1991. On January 24, 1990, Fisher scored 23 points in a 99–94 win over the Oklahoma Sooners. She was on the 1991 OSU team that made it to the Sweet 16 in the NCAA tournament, the first OSU team to make it that far, and averaged 10.9 points a game that season.

=== 2010–2013 Cheyenne Bears ===
The Bears also made a historic run as area champions and state qualifiers in men's basketball from 2010 to 2013, winning a state championship in 2012 and state runner-up in 2011.

== Geography ==
Cheyenne is located just south of the Washita River, approximately 23 miles (37 km) north of Sayre. The town is in Southwestern Oklahoma, known for Oklahoma Tourism purposes as Great Plains Country.

According to the United States Census Bureau, the town has a total area of 1.0 square mile (2.6 km^{2}), all land.

=== Distances ===
- 81 miles (130 km) north of Altus
- 155 miles (249 km) east of Amarillo
- 29 miles (47 km) northwest of Elk City
- 150 miles (240 km) west of Oklahoma City
- 77 miles (124 km) south of Woodward

== Transportation ==
Cheyenne is on U.S. Route 283 and Oklahoma State Highway 47.

Cheyenne is served by Mignon Laird Municipal Airport (FAA Identifier: 93F). It is located two miles west of town, and has a 4022 x 60 ft. paved runway.

While Lawton-Fort Sill Regional Airport is 6 miles closer, more commercial airline connections are available at the larger Will Rogers World Airport, 142 miles to the east.

== Attractions ==
Cheyenne has a City Park and Museum Complex, with six museums in the complex. These include the Pioneer Museum, the One Room School, the Minnie Slief Community Museum and Veterans Display, the Santa Fe Depot, the chapel, and the Kendall House Log Cabin. All museums are free.

The Washita Battlefield National Historic Site is west of town.

Cheyenne is essentially surrounded by the Black Kettle National Grassland, and the Black Kettle Recreation Area on Hwy 47 outside Cheyenne includes tent camping areas, hiking trails, picnic areas, a lake with a boat ramp for no-wake boating and fishing, and nature trails and viewing.

Foss State Park on Foss Reservoir is about 33 miles east-southeast.

== Demographics ==
Historical population
| Census | Pop. | Note | %± |
|---|---|---|---|
| 1910 | 468 | | — |
| 1920 | 400 | | −14.5% |
| 1930 | 826 | | 106.5% |
| 1940 | 1,070 | | 29.5% |
| 1950 | 1,133 | | 5.9% |
| 1960 | 930 | | −17.9% |
| 1970 | 892 | | −4.1% |
| 1980 | 1,207 | | 35.3% |
| 1990 | 948 | | −21.5% |
| 2000 | 778 | | −17.9% |
| 2010 | 801 | | 3.0% |
| 2020 | 771 | | −3.7% |
U.S. Decennial Census

=== 2020 census ===
As of the 2020 census, Cheyenne had a population of 771. The median age was 37.0 years. 29.1% of residents were under the age of 18 and 13.9% of residents were 65 years of age or older. For every 100 females there were 92.3 males, and for every 100 females age 18 and over there were 91.9 males age 18 and over.

0.0% of residents lived in urban areas, while 100.0% lived in rural areas.

There were 303 households in Cheyenne, of which 38.9% had children under the age of 18 living in them. Of all households, 46.9% were married-couple households, 18.5% were households with a male householder and no spouse or partner present, and 29.4% were households with a female householder and no spouse or partner present. About 31.4% of all households were made up of individuals and 12.6% had someone living alone who was 65 years of age or older.

There were 410 housing units, of which 26.1% were vacant. The homeowner vacancy rate was 2.0% and the rental vacancy rate was 21.1%.

Racial composition as of the 2020 census
| Race | Number | Percent |
|---|---|---|
| White | 643 | 83.4% |
| Black or African American | 4 | 0.5% |
| American Indian and Alaska Native | 16 | 2.1% |
| Asian | 0 | 0.0% |
| Native Hawaiian and Other Pacific Islander | 1 | 0.1% |
| Some other race | 26 | 3.4% |
| Two or more races | 81 | 10.5% |
| Hispanic or Latino (of any race) | 107 | 13.9% |

=== 2000 census ===
As of the census of 2000, there were 778 people, 356 households, and 196 families residing in the town. The population density was 784.6 inhabitants per square mile (302.9/km^{2}). There were 417 housing units at an average density of 420.5 per square mile (162.4/km^{2}). The racial makeup of the town was 97.04% White, 0.64% African American, 0.64% Native American, and 1.67% from two or more races. Hispanic or Latino of any race were 2.19% of the population.

There were 356 households, out of which 26.4% had children under the age of 18 living with them, 45.5% were married couples living together, 6.2% had a female householder with no husband present, and 44.7% were non-families. 42.7% of all households were made up of individuals, and 24.7% had someone living alone who was 65 years of age or older. The average household size was 2.08 and the average family size was 2.87.

In the town, the population was spread out, with 22.1% under the age of 18, 6.8% from 18 to 24, 24.3% from 25 to 44, 23.8% from 45 to 64, and 23.0% who were 65 years of age or older. The median age was 43 years. For every 100 females, there were 97.0 males. For every 100 females age 18 and over, there were 87.6 males.

The median income for a household in the town was $25,313, and the median income for a family was $37,159. Males had a median income of $25,156 versus $17,500 for females. The per capita income for the town was $16,428. About 15.3% of families and 18.4% of the population were below the poverty line, including 25.7% of those under age 18 and 11.7% of those age 65 or over.

== Education ==
It is in the Cheyenne Public Schools school district.

== Notable people ==
- Frank Lucas (born 1960), U.S. representative for Oklahoma
