= U.S. Route 283 =

Highway in the United States

U.S. Route 283
- US 283 highlighted in red

Route information
- Auxiliary route of US 83
- Length: 730 mi (1,170 km)
- Existed: 1931–present

Major junctions
- South end: US 87 near Brady, TX
- I-20 at Baird, TX; I-40 at Sayre, OK; I-70 / US-40 at WaKeeney, KS; I-80 at Lexington, NE
- North end: US 30 at Lexington, NE

Location
- Country: United States
- States: Texas, Oklahoma, Kansas, Nebraska

Highway system
- United States Numbered Highway System; List; Special; Divided

U.S. Route 283 is a spur of U.S. Route 83. It currently runs for 731 miles (1,175 km) from Brady, Texas at U.S. Route 87 to Lexington, Nebraska at U.S. Route 30. It passes through the states of Texas, Oklahoma, Kansas, and Nebraska.

== Route description ==
=== Texas ===
The southern terminus of US 283 is at an intersection with US 87 about three miles (4.8 km) northwest of Brady. The highway travels through rural areas of McCulloch County before entering Coleman County. US 283 maintains its rural route before entering the town of Santa Anna, beginning an overlap with US 84. The two highways travel northwest together to the town of Coleman before they split. US 283 returns to a rural route once again and intersects State Highway 36 (SH 36) in southern Callahan County. The highway runs through the city of Baird, where it crosses Interstate 20 (I-20). US 283 next enters the city of Albany, where it shares a short overlap with US 180 and SH 6. Just south of Throckmorton, US 283 begins a lengthy overlap with US 183. The two routes travel to Seymour and begin an overlap with US 277 and US 82. US 183 and US 283 separate from US 82 and US 277 in the unincorporated community of Mabelle. In Vernon, US 283 separates from US 183 at a junction with US 70 and US 287. US 283 runs in a slight northwest direction before crossing the Red River into Oklahoma.

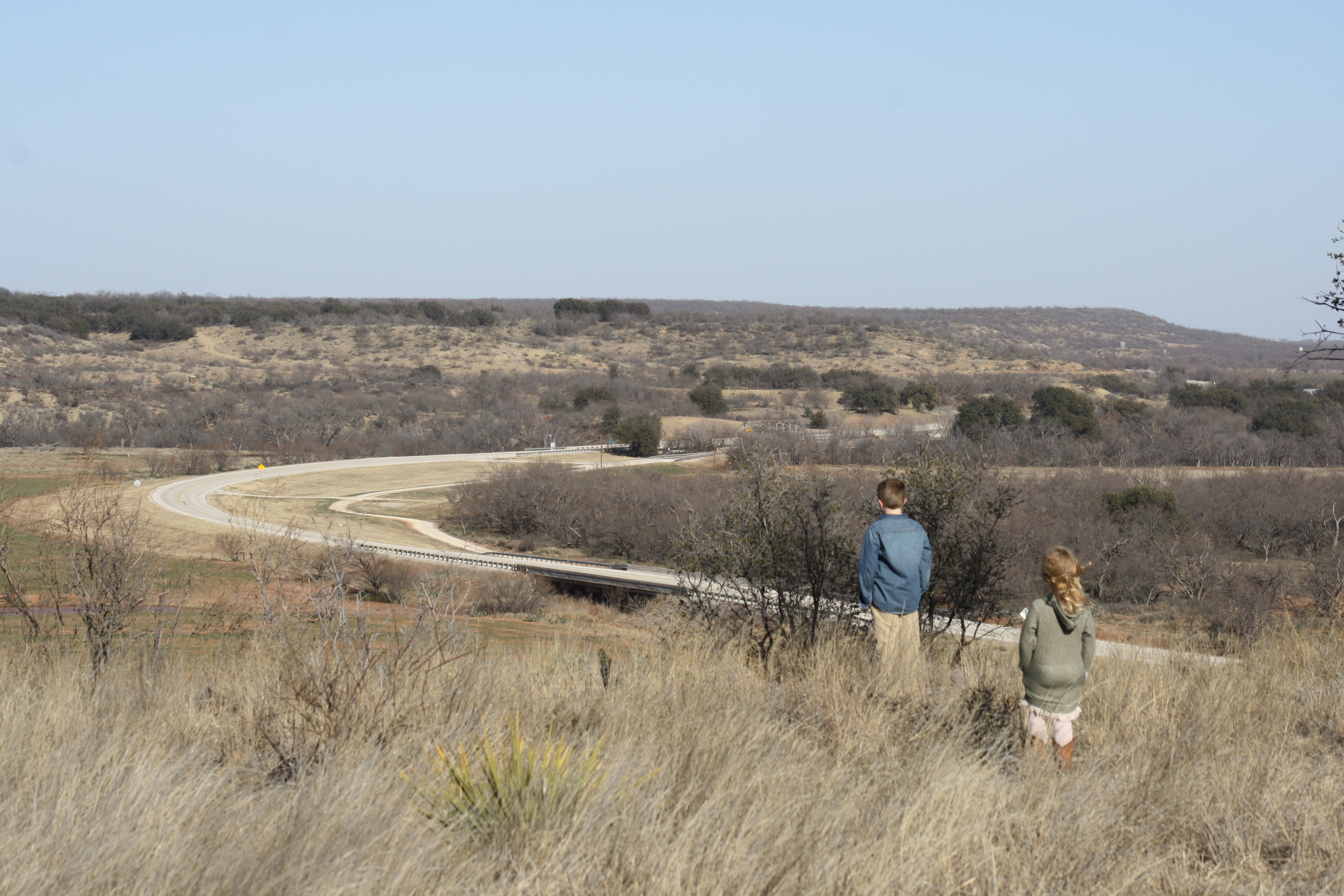
Section of U.S. Route 283 viewed from Fort Griffin State Historic Site, north of Albany, Texas.

=== Oklahoma ===
US-283 enters Oklahoma from Texas in rural Jackson County at a crossing of the Red River. It runs concurrently with State Highway 5 for several miles past Elmer and continues north to Altus, the largest Oklahoma town on the route. At the intersection of U.S. Highway 62 in Altus, SH-5 splits off and 283 joins with State Highway 6 for the next 12 miles (19 km) before it takes a western bend to the town of Mangum. The route continues northwesterly until it crosses I-40 at Sayre.

Through northwestern Oklahoma, US-283 passes through very sparsely populated areas and is the main north–south traffic corridor. After passing through Cheyenne, 283 meanders through Black Kettle National Grassland then crosses the Canadian River. It continues north to Arnett where it joins with State Highway 51 west for 7 miles (11 km) then turns north again passing through Shattuck and Laverne following part of State Highway 15 along the way. North of Laverne, 283 turns west for 2 miles (3.2 km) to visit the town of Rosston then turns north again to cross the Cimarron River shortly before leaving the state for Kansas.

Some points of interest along US-283 in Oklahoma include the Museum of the Western Prairie in Altus; the Old Greer County Museum in Mangum; Black Kettle National Grassland and the Washita Battlefield National Historic Site near Cheyenne and the Shattuck Windmill Museum.

=== Kansas ===
US-283 enters from Oklahoma south of Englewood in Clark County, and passes through largely unpopulated areas of the county until joining up for a brief concurrency with U.S. Route 160. Following the split, US-283 continues north through Minneola before making its way into Dodge City, the only town with a population of more than 3,300 the highway passes through in the Sunflower State.

At Dodge City, US-283 jogs east. It meets with U.S. Route 400, but the two highways do not stay joined for long; US-400 splits and heads southeast towards Greensburg, while US-283 continues eastbound past the Dodge City Regional Airport. After passing the airport, the route then bends northeast before joining U.S. Route 50 and U.S. Route 56 for a brief stint.

US-50 and US-56 split east towards Kinsley, and US-283 resumes a due northerly course through open fields before reaching Jetmore, where K-156 crosses in an east–west direction. K-156 heads to Garden City westbound and Great Bend eastbound. The highway continues on another stretch through sparsely populated farmland before reaching Ness City and K-96, the first of two junctions in Ness County. The other junction in the county is at K-4 near Ransom.

The highway reaches Interstate 70 in WaKeeney, and makes a brief jog east through downtown WaKeeney before turning back to the north. US-283 between Ransom and I-70 was closed for much of 2006 as part of a major reconstruction program.

The highway continues north to Hill City, where it crosses U.S. Route 24. The route stays on course until it reaches southern Norton County, where it has a brief concurrency with K-9. At the split, K-9 continues west to Lenora, and US-283 resumes a straight northerly direction until the city of Norton, where after crossing U.S. Route 36, it reaches Nebraska 11 miles (18 km) later.

With the exception of small sections in Dodge City, all portions of US-283 in Kansas are two-laned.

=== Nebraska ===
U.S. Highway 283 enters Nebraska south of Arapahoe. At Arapahoe, US 283 meets U.S. Highway 6 and U.S. Highway 34. It continues north through Elwood, then turns northeast. Near Lexington, US 283 crosses the Platte River and intersects Interstate 80. It continues north into Lexington as a divided highway, turns back to a 2 lane road, crosses the Union Pacific railroad tracks via an overpass, and after taking 2 right turns on city streets, it ends at an intersection with U.S. Highway 30.

== Major intersections ==
Texas
US 87 northwest of Brady
US 67 / US 84 in Santa Anna. US 67/US 283 travels concurrently through Santa Anna. US 84/US 283 travels concurrently to Coleman.
I-20 in Baird
US 180 in Albany. The highways travel concurrently through Albany.
US 183 south of Throckmorton. The highways travel concurrently to Vernon.
US 380 in Throckmorton
US 277 south-southwest of Seymour. The highways travel concurrently to Mabelle.
US 82 north-northeast of Seymour. The highways travel concurrently to Mabelle.
US 70 / US 183 / US 287 in Vernon
Oklahoma
US 62 in Altus
I-40 in Sayre
US 60 east of Arnett. The highways travel concurrently to west of Arnett.
US 270 / US 412 south-southeast of Laverne
US 64 east of Rosston. The highways travel concurrently to northwest of Rosston.
Kansas
US 160 north of Englewood. The highways travel concurrently to south-southeast of Minneola.
US 54 in Minneola
US 56 / US 400 south of Dodge City. US 56/US 283 travels concurrently to . US 283/US 400 travels concurrently to Dodge City.
US 50 east-northeast of Dodge City. The highways travel concurrently to west-southwest of Wright.
I-70 / US 40 in WaKeeney
US 24 in Hill City
US 36 in Norton
Nebraska
US 6 / US 34 in Arapahoe
I-80 south of Lexington
US 30 in Lexington

Browse numbered routes
| ← US 281 | TX | → SH 283 |
| ← US 281 | OK | → US 287 |
| ← US-281 | KS | → K-284 |
| ← US 281 | NE | → N-370 |
