= Black Kettle National Grassland =

Protected prairie in Roger Mills County, Oklahoma and Hemphill County, Texas

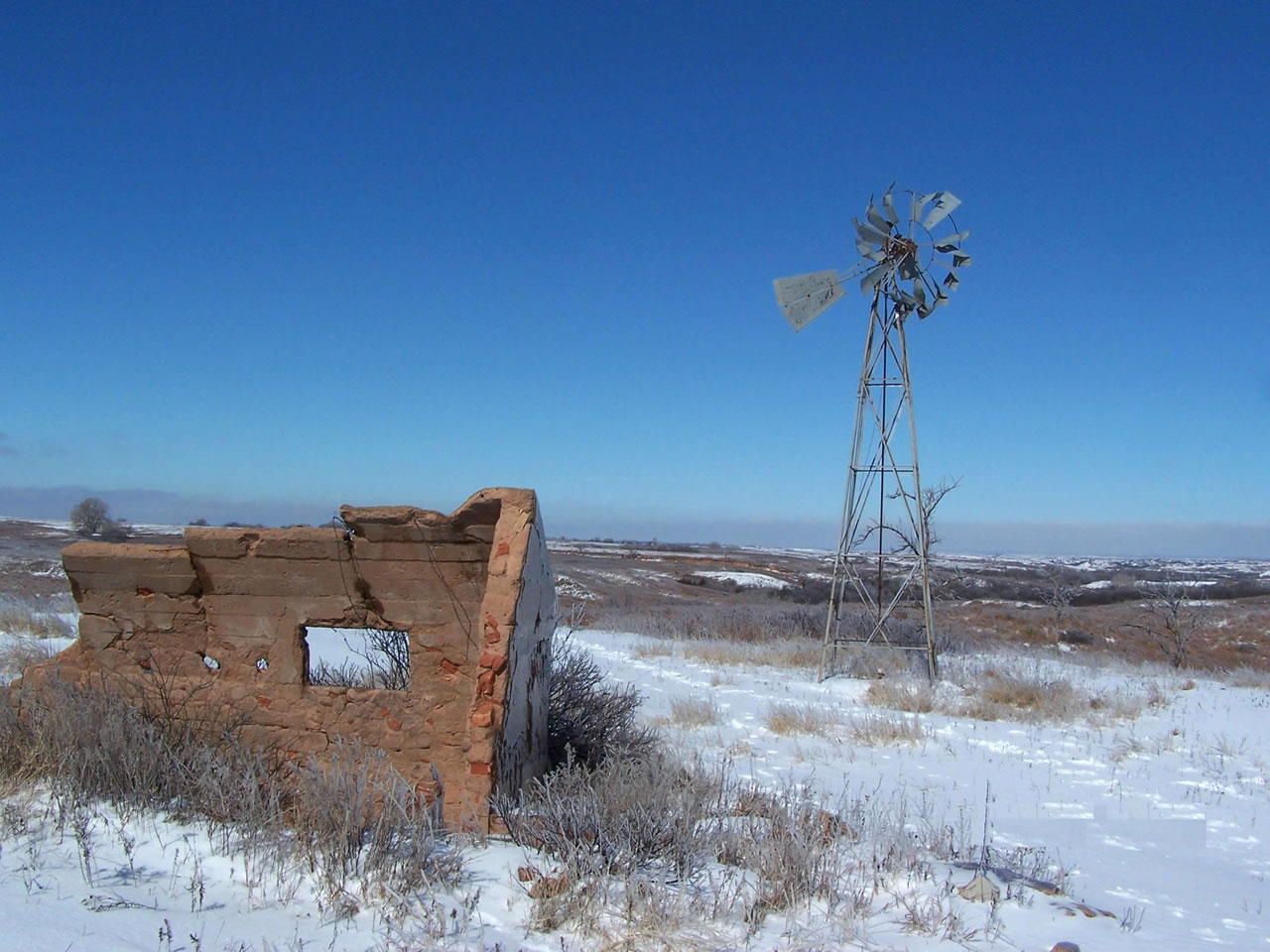
- A homestead structure in Black Kettle National Grassland

- Location within Oklahoma Location within Texas Location within the United States
- Location: Roger Mills County, Oklahoma and Hemphill County, Texas, United States
- Nearest city: Cheyenne, OK
- Coordinates: 35.6166°N 99.68655°W
- Area: 31,286 acres (12,661 ha)
- Established: 1960
- Governing body: U.S. Forest Service
- Website: Black Kettle and McClellan Creek National Grasslands

The Black Kettle National Grassland, in Roger Mills County, Oklahoma, and Hemphill County, Texas, contains 31,286 acres (12,661 ha) of which 30,710 acres (12,430 ha) are in Oklahoma.

Named for the Indian leader Black Kettle, the grassland is managed by the Cibola National Forest, which also manages the Rita Blanca National Grassland in Dallam County, Texas and Cimarron County, Oklahoma, and McClellan Creek National Grassland in Gray County, Texas.

== Setting ==
The National Grassland consists of about 100 tracts of land interspaced with privately owned ranchland. It is located in the mixed grass prairie region. The terrain is characterized by sandy and red slate hills in addition to grassland and oak brush. The creek bottoms are wooded with cottonwood, elm, and hackberry. Wildlife includes white-tailed deer, turkey and quail. The Washita River flows through the grassland. It is a small stream here near its headwaters, only a few feet wide and shallow. The nearest town is Cheyenne where the grassland headquarters is located.

== History ==
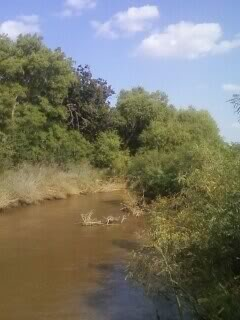
The Washita River flows through the National Grassland.

This Black Kettle National Grassland was home to the Comanche and other nomadic Indian tribes who camped and hunted in the area, attracted by abundant water and wood and buffalo herds. In 1868 Lt. Col. George Armstrong Custer led an attack on a Cheyenne village here in what was called the Battle of the Washita. The grassland is named for Black Kettle (Cheyenne: Mo'ohtavetoo'o), the Southern Cheyenne leader killed in the river fleeing the attack. The area became part of the Cheyenne and Arapaho Indian reservation in 1867, but the treaty lands were partitioned and shrunk by multiple federal acts, including the Dawes Act which carved the land into parcels owned by individual households, and was opened to private settlement in 1892. Farmers enjoyed many years of good crops during an unusually wet period, especially wheat, until the Dust Bowl years of the 1930s. "Poor conservation and agricultural practices, combined with periods of wind, drought, and rain stripped the area of its topsoil" and the government bought the land from bankrupt farmers. In 1938, the Soil Conservation Service began a replanting and restoration effort and in 1960 it was designated a national grassland. The grassland is used for recreation, oil and gas production, and cattle grazing.

== Black Kettle Wildlife Management Area ==
30,710 acres (12,430 ha) of the 100 separate tracts of land in the national forest is co-managed as the Black Kettle Wildlife Management Area by the Oklahoma State Department of Wildlife Conservation.

== Recreation ==
There are three developed recreation areas in Oklahoma and one in Texas. Dead Warrior Lake (formerly Dead Indian Lake) is 80 acres (32 ha) in size and is 11 miles (18 km) north of Cheyenne. Spring Creek Lake is 14 miles (23 km) north of Cheyenne and is 50 acres (20 ha) in size. Sixty-acre (24 ha) Skipout Lake is 10 miles (16 km) west of Cheyenne. A 1.75-mile (2.82 km) hiking trail circles the lake. Lake Marvin in Texas is 63 acres (25 ha) acres in size. All lakes offer fishing, picnicking, and primitive camping sites. Hiking, wildlife observation, and hunting are permitted on most of the National Grasslands acreage. Croton Creek Watchable Wildlife Area, about 6 miles (9.7 km) west of Cheyenne has two trail loops totaling 1.6 miles (2.6 km).

The Washita Battlefield National Historic Site is located just west of Cheyenne and offers a 1.5-mile (2.4 km) walking trail, a visitors center, and a panoramic view of the Battlefield and the National Grassland.

North of the grassland is the South Canadian River which flows through a steep and hilly canyon. On the northern side of the River in Ellis County is the Packsaddle Wildlife Management Area, 19,659 acres (7,956 ha) of mixed grass prairie, forested river bottomland, and colorful red sand hills. Hunting for white-tailed deer, quail, and turkey is popular. Near Packsaddle is the Nature Conservancy's Four Canyon Preserve, 4,000 acres (1,600 ha) of similar terrain. The Conservancy is attempting to eradicate non-native plant species from the Preserve and enhance prairie habitat for species such as the vulnerable Lesser Prairie Chicken.

Grasslands are believed to be the most endangered ecosystem in North America. The National Grassland, Packsaddle, and Four Canyon preserve a significant remnant of mixed grass prairie and free-flowing prairie river.

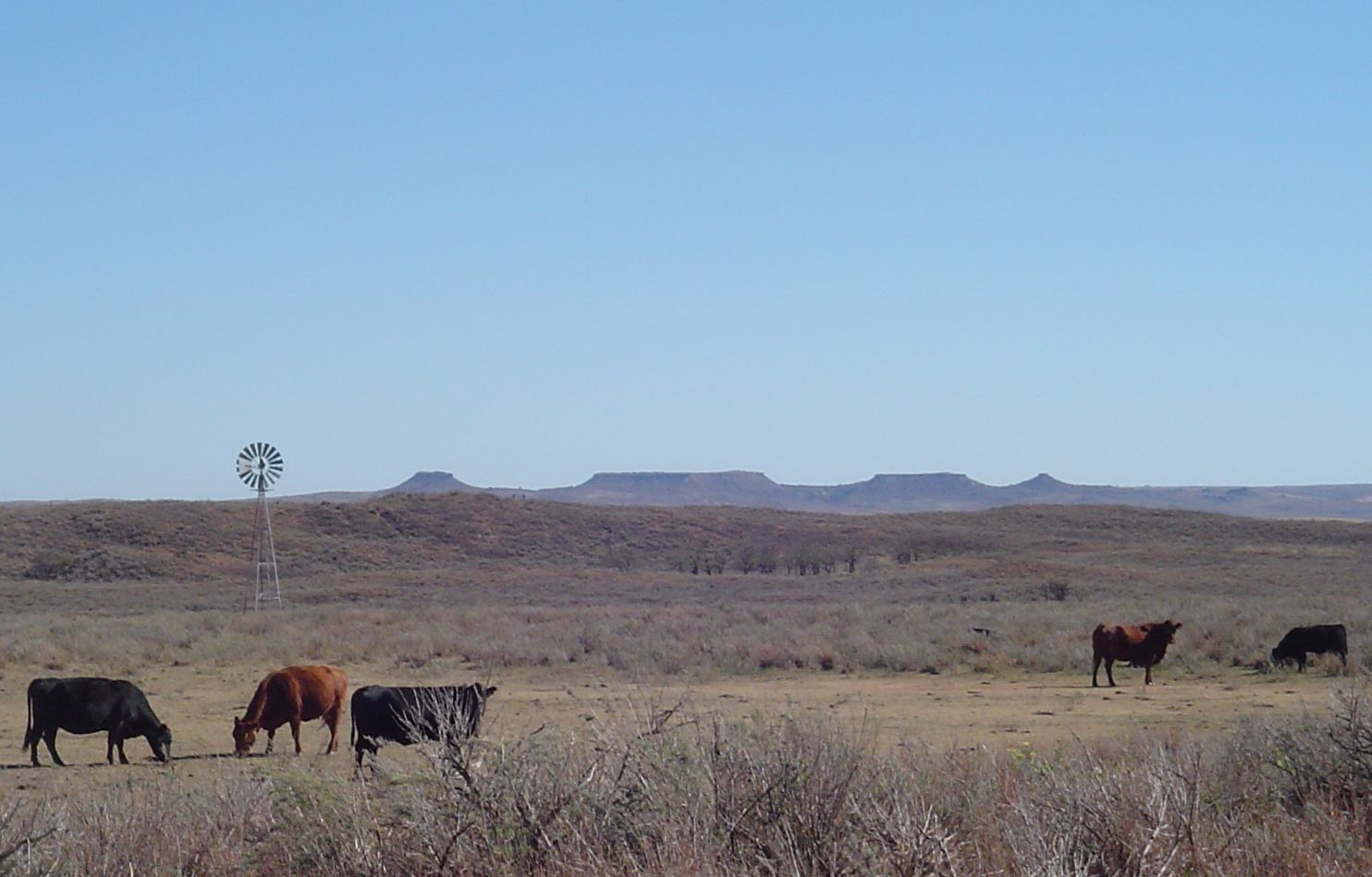
A scene of the Black Kettle region with the Antelope Hills in the background. The shinnery oak brush (Quercus havardii) in this picture is typical of sandy soils.

== See also ==
- List of protected grasslands of North America
- Grasslands of the Great Plains (U.S.)
- Native grasses of the Great Plains region
