= National Register of Historic Places listings in Ellis County, Oklahoma =

Location of Ellis County in Oklahoma

This is a list of the National Register of Historic Places listings in Ellis County, Oklahoma.

This is intended to be a complete list of the properties on the National Register of Historic Places in Ellis County, Oklahoma, United States. The locations of National Register properties for which the latitude and longitude coordinates are included below, may be seen in a map.

There are 10 properties listed on the National Register in the county.

This National Park Service list is complete through NPS recent listings posted October 23, 2026.

== Current listings ==
	Name on the Register	Image	Date listed	Location	City or town	Description
1	Bank of Gage	Bank of Gage	October 7, 1983 (#83004169)	Corner of Main and Cedar; 36°19′14″N 99°45′26″W	Gage	
2	George Carr Ranch House		April 10, 1985 (#85000788)	Northwest of Camargo; 36°02′31″N 99°23′06″W	Camargo	
3	Davison Silo		November 14, 1978 (#78002234)	20 miles (32 km) southeast of Arnett; 35°59′46″N 99°35′23″W	Arnett	Burned in 1993
4	Eggleston Springs	Eggleston Springs	November 27, 1978 (#78002235)	Address Restricted	Arnett	
5	Ellis County Courthouse	Ellis County Courthouse	March 22, 1985 (#85000681)	Town Square; 36°08′04″N 99°46′14″W	Arnett	
6	Ingle Brothers Broomcorn Warehouse		December 3, 2009 (#09000975)	320 NW 1st St. 36°16′36″N 99°53′03″W	Shattuck	Brick warehouse with stepped gable.
7	First State Bank	First State Bank	October 7, 1983 (#83004170)	239 S. Main St. 36°16′28″N 99°52′51″W	Shattuck	Apparently no longer extant
8	Grand Town Site		June 5, 1972 (#72001063)	14 miles south of Arnett; 35°58′56″N 99°47′43″W	Arnett	
9	Shattuck National Bank Building	Shattuck National Bank Building	October 7, 1983 (#83004171)	101 S. Main St. 36°16′33″N 99°52′54″W	Shattuck	
10	Stock Exchange Bank	Stock Exchange Bank	October 7, 1983 (#83004173)	Main St. 36°22′34″N 99°37′25″W	Fargo	

== Determined eligible ==
At least one property in Ellis County has been determined eligible but was not finally listed on the National Register.

	Name on the Register	Image	Date listed	Location	City or town	Description
1	Harrel Bison Kill		n/a (#13000938)	Address Restricted	Camargo	Determined eligible on December 18, 2013.

== See also ==
- List of National Historic Landmarks in Oklahoma
- National Register of Historic Places listings in Oklahoma
