= Oklahoma State Highway 149 =

State highway in Oklahoma, United States

State Highway 149

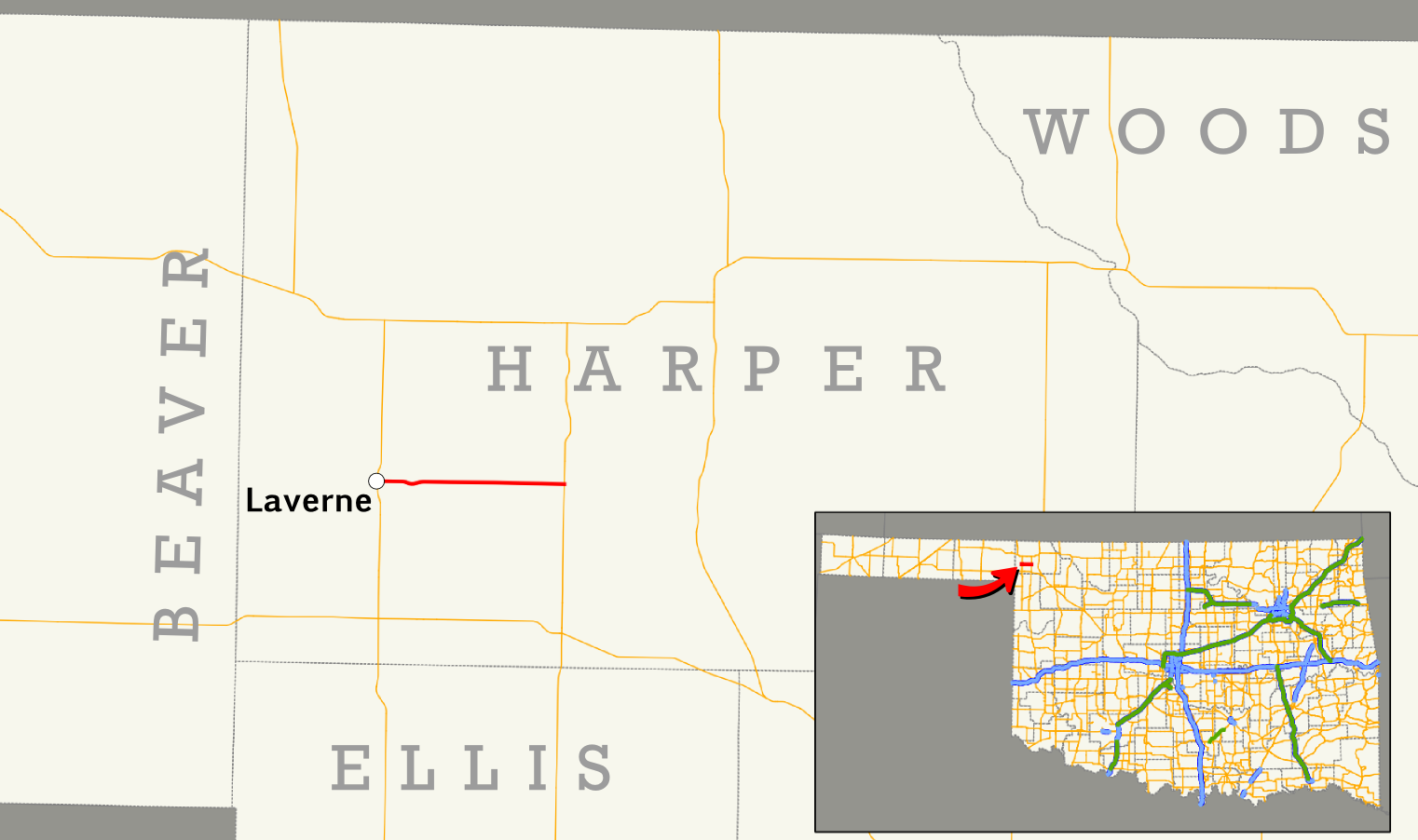

Route information
- Maintained by ODOT
- Length: 8.19 mi (13.18 km)

Major junctions
- West end: US 283 in Laverne
- East end: SH-46 north of May

Location
- Country: United States
- State: Oklahoma

Highway system
- Oklahoma State Highway System; Interstate; US; State; Turnpikes
← SH-147	→ SH-150

State Highway 149 (abbreviated SH-149) is a state highway in Oklahoma. It runs 8.19 miles (13.18 km) in Harper County, from US-283 in Laverne to SH-46, seven miles (11 km) north of May.

== Route description ==
SH-149 begins at US-283 in Laverne. From this junction, the highway follows Main Street to the east out of town. The road dips gently to the south approximately one mile (1.6 km) east of Laverne before returning to its previous line of latitude. About two and a half miles (4.0 km) east of Laverne, the road crosses the Beaver River. SH-149 then continues due east to SH-46, where it ends.

== Junction list ==
The entire route is in Harper County.

Location	mi	km	Destinations	Notes
Laverne	0.00	0.00	US 283	Western terminus
	8.19	13.18	SH-46	Eastern terminus
1.000 mi = 1.609 km; 1.000 km = 0.621 mi
