= Oklahoma State Highway 46 =

State highway in Oklahoma, United States

State Highway 46

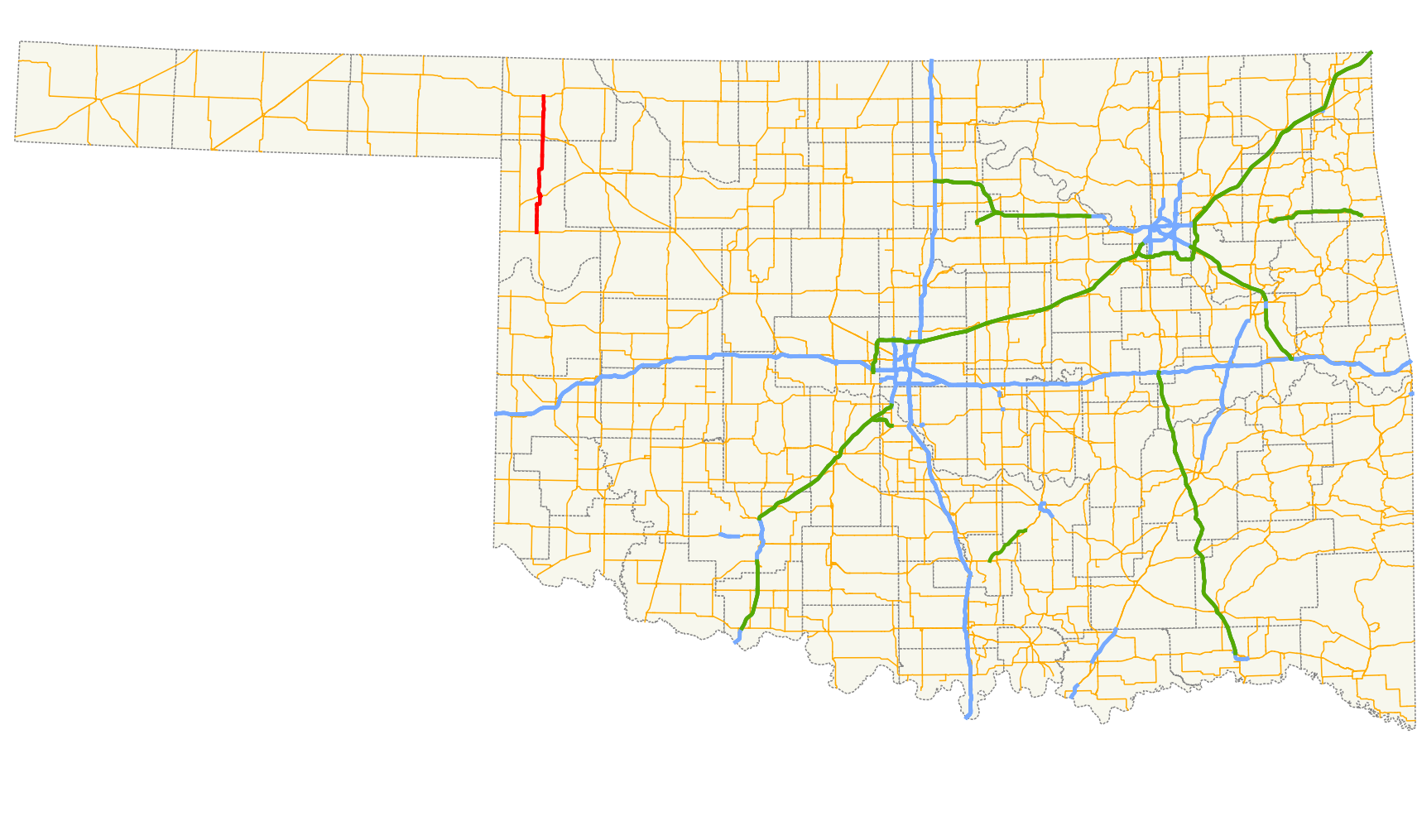

Route information
- Maintained by ODOT
- Length: 49.3 mi (79.3 km)

Major junctions
- South end: US 60 / US 283 / SH-51 in Arnett
- US 270 / US 412 / SH-3 in May
- North end: US 64 west of Buffalo

Location
- Country: United States
- State: Oklahoma

Highway system
- Oklahoma State Highway System; Interstate; US; State; Turnpikes
← SH-45	→ SH-47

State Highway 46 (abbreviated SH-46) is a state highway in northwest Oklahoma. It runs 49.3 miles (79.3 km) south-to-north in Ellis and Harper Counties.

== Route description ==
SH-46 begins at US-60/US-283/SH-51 on the west side of Arnett. The road runs north 13 miles (21 km) to the junction of SH-15 at Gage, then continues another 22 miles (35 km) to May, where it crosses US-270/US-412/SH-3.

Three miles north of May, SH-46 crosses the North Canadian River, and 4 miles (6.4 km) after that, SH-149 branches off to the west, connecting to the town of Laverne. Seven miles later, SH-46 ends at US-64, 8 miles (13 km) west of Buffalo.

== Junction list ==
County	Location	mi	km	Destinations	Notes
Ellis	Arnett	0.0	0.0	US 60 / US 283 / SH-51	Southern terminus
Ellis	Gage	13.6	21.9	SH-15	Western end of SH-15 concurrency
Ellis	Gage	13.8	22.2	SH-15	Eastern end of SH-15 concurrency
Harper	May	35.5	57.1	US 270 / US 412 / SH-3	
Harper		42.1	67.8	SH-149	Eastern terminus of SH-149
Harper		49.3	79.3	US 64	Northern terminus
1.000 mi = 1.609 km; 1.000 km = 0.621 mi: Concurrency terminus
