= Senator Griffin (disambiguation) =

Robert P. Griffin (1923–2015) was a U.S. Senator from Michigan from 1966 to 1979. Senator Griffin may also refer to:

- AJ Griffin (politician) (fl. 2010s), Oklahoma State Senate
- Anthony J. Griffin (1866–1935), New York State Senate
- Ben Hill Griffin Jr. (1910–1990), Florida State Senate
- Floyd Griffin (born 1944), Georgia State Senate
- Gail Griffin (fl. 1990s–2010s), Arizona State Senate
- James D. Griffin (1929–2008), New York State Senate
- James W. Griffin (1935–2023), Iowa State Senate
- John K. Griffin (1789–1841), South Carolina State Senate
- John Griffin (Allegany County, New York) (1770s–1846), New York State Senate
- Michael Griffin (Indiana politician) (fl. 2020s), Indiana State Senate
- Michael Griffin (Wisconsin politician) (1842–1899), Wisconsin State Senate
