= AJ Griffin =

AJ Griffin or A. J. Griffin may refer to:

- A. J. Griffin (baseball) (born 1988), American professional baseball pitcher
- AJ Griffin (basketball) (born 2003), American professional basketball player
- AJ Griffin (politician), American politician
