= Harmon, Oklahoma =

- Unincorporated community
- Location within Oklahoma
- Coordinates: 36°08′41″N 99°33′37″W
- Country: United States
- State: Oklahoma
- County: Ellis
- Elevation: 2,497 ft (761 m)
- Time zone: UTC-6 (Central (CST))
  - Summer (DST): UTC-5 (CDT)
- Area code: 580
- GNIS feature ID: 1093546

Harmon is an unincorporated community in Ellis County, Oklahoma, United States. Harmon is located on U.S. Route 60, 12 miles (19 km) east of Arnett.

Olin Branstetter (1929-2011), businessman and Oklahoma state legislator, was born in Harmon.
