= Grand, Oklahoma =

- Ghost town
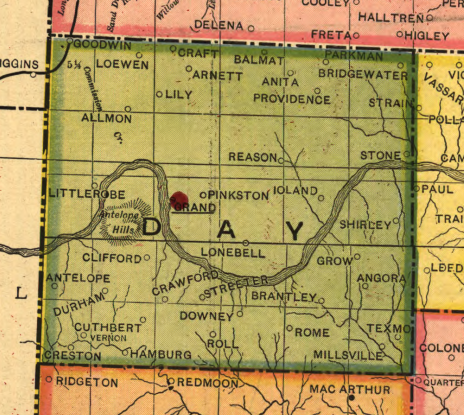
- Grand was the county seat of old Day County

- Location within Oklahoma Location within the United States
- Coordinates: 35°58′56″N 99°47′43″W
- Country: United States
- State: Oklahoma
- County: Ellis
- Founded: 1892
- Abandoned: 1943
- Named for: Grandville Alcorn
- Elevation: 2,105 ft (642 m)

Grand is a ghost town in Ellis County, Oklahoma, United States. It served as the county seat of Day County and then of Ellis County until the seat moved to Arnett in 1908.

== History ==
The county seat of Day County, originally known as "E" County, was first established as Ioland around 1890. But people complained that Ioland had “bad tasting water,” with there being no better available sources near the locale. Perhaps for this reason, when Day County's county courthouse in Ioland burned down on November 12, 1893, the county commissioners voted to switch the county seat to Grand the day after. (Note: Some sources for the day of the arson differed by about a week. While one says the burning of the courthouse was on the 18th, two others say it was on the 12th, meaning it was most likely on the 12th.) The move was of questionable legality, but was sufficient as a practical matter to shift functions to Grand.

According to George Shirk, the namesake for the town was Grandville Alcorn, the son of Robert Alcorn, county judge. But another source says that while there are a number of legends as to how Grand got its name, the most likely originated with an outing shortly after the switch with a number of county officers and citizens standing next to Grands's big spring on a beautiful day and one remarking, “Well, this is Grand.” The name stuck.

The Day County Tribune newspaper, then very young, moved along with the county seat from Ioland to Grand on November 13, 1893, where it continued under the same name. The paper, without mentioning Ioland in its edition of December 21, 1893, referred to Grand as a place in her infancy, highlighted its growth in the prior two weeks, and touted the quality of the locale's water. The paper possibly lasted until 1918.

After Oklahoma statehood, the county seat election for Ellis County in June 1908 did not even have Grand as a choice, as Grand was located on the extreme southern edge of the newly configured county. The contenders were Gage, Shattuck and Arnett, with the centrally-located Arnett winning in a subsequent runoff. Various parties complained that Arnett had no suitable building to house the records, a dispute that was only finally resolved with construction of the brick Ellis County Courthouse in 1912.

The Grand post office, opened November 4, 1892, survived until September 30, 1943. Only the footings of the courthouse and the vault that once held the Day County records remain visible at the site.

Grand had a cemetery and a post office; the cemetery is located at 36.01305°N 99.81801°W.

The site was added to the National Register of Historic Places in 1972 as the Grand Town Site.

== Notable person ==
Grand was the birthplace of Western swing musician Spade Cooley in 1910.

== See also ==
- National Register of Historic Places listings in Ellis County, Oklahoma
