= Ellis County Courthouse =

Ellis County Courthouse may refer to:

- Ellis County Courthouse (Kansas)
- Ellis County Courthouse (Oklahoma)
- Ellis County Courthouse (Texas), designed by James Riely Gordon
