= Catesby, Oklahoma =

- Unincorporated community
- Location within the state of Oklahoma Catesby (the United States)
- Coordinates: 36°29′35″N 99°57′46″W
- Country: United States
- State: Oklahoma
- County: Ellis
- Elevation: 2,392 ft (729 m)

Population (2000)
  - Total: 2
- Time zone: UTC-6 (Central (CST))
  - Summer (DST): UTC-5 (CDT)
- GNIS feature ID: 1100273

Catesby is an unincorporated community located in Ellis County, Oklahoma, United States. It is slightly east of the southeast corner of the Oklahoma Panhandle, north on S. County Rd 171 off of Oklahoma State Highway 15, and west on E0360Rd off of U.S. Route 283.

The locale, named for Catesby ap Roger Jones, was founded on July 1, 1902. The post office was opened by Ella M. Rose on February 18, 1902. The community remains a legal town site, although the post office was closed on January 1, 1970.

As of the centennial in 2002, there were two residents, making it the smallest townsite in Oklahoma.
