= Paul Muegge =

American politician (1936–2021)

Member of the Oklahoma Senate from the 20th district
- In office November 1990 – November 19, 2002
- Preceded by: Olin Branstetter
- Succeeded by: David Myers

Personal details
- Born: September 28, 1936 Lamont, Oklahoma
- Died: August 16, 2021 (aged 84) Tonkawa, Oklahoma
- Party: Democratic
- Education: Oklahoma State University

Paul Muegge (September 28, 1936 – August 16, 2021) was an American politician who served in the Oklahoma Senate from the 20th district from 1990 to 2002.

Muegge graduated from Lamont High School.

He died on August 16, 2021, in Tonkawa, Oklahoma at age 84.
