= Ioland, Oklahoma =

- Ghost town
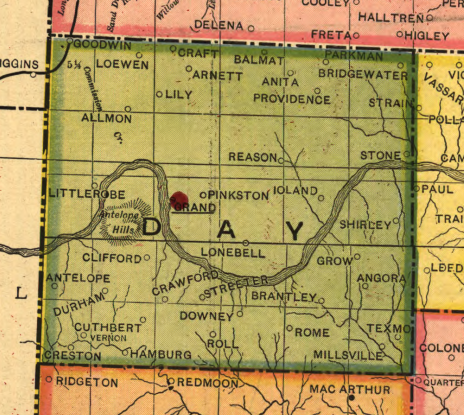
- Ioland is seen in the right half of Day County.

- Location within Oklahoma Location within the United States
- Coordinates: 35°56′38.17″N 99°31′18.42″W
- Country: United States
- State: Oklahoma
- County: Ellis
- Elevation: 1,978 ft (603 m)
- Time zone: UTC-6 (Central (CST))
  - Summer (DST): UTC-5 (CDT)
- Area code: 580
- Newspapers: Day County Tribune

Ioland was a town in present-day Ellis County, Oklahoma, 1/2 mile (0.80 km) north of the Canadian River and bordering the southeastern portion of that county. Nothing remains there besides the Ioland Cemetery and Ioland School. The town was approximately 16 miles (26 km) east of Grand, located in the same county.

== History ==
The town was a part of the now non-existent Day County, which during its early period was known as "E" County. Ioland was "E" County's county seat for a short period of time extending from about 1890 until governmental functions were moved to the town of Grand on November 13, 1893.

As of 1893, Ioland had a store, hotel, courthouse, and several places of residence. Alongside this, Ioland also had a triweekly mail route via the neighboring community of Grand's post office; the route would go to Higgins, Texas. It also had a weekly mail route to Camargo, Oklahoma.

The first man lynched in Oklahoma since its organization as a territory, J.L. Chandler, was a resident of Ioland. He was lynched by a group of cattlemen due to allegedly poisoning their cattle's water supply.

Ioland had its own school, aptly named Ioland School, located inside a log cabin built in 1894. The school was a half mile above the aforementioned Ioland Cemetery. As of 1974, the Ioland School was switched from a schooling facility to a community center and voting place.

=== County seat switch ===
People complained that Ioland had “bad tasting water,” with there being no better available sources near the locale. Perhaps for this reason, when Day County's county courthouse in Ioland burned down on November 12, 1893, the county commissioners voted to switch the county seat to Grand the day after. (Note: Some sources for the day of the arson differed by about a week. While one says the burning of the courthouse was on the 18th, two others say it was on the 12th, meaning it was most likely on the 12th.) The move was of questionable legality, but was sufficient as a practical matter to shift functions to Grand. Nevertheless, Ioland continued to exist as a community, as evidenced by a 1911 Rand-McNally map of what had become Ellis County.

=== Newspaper ===
Around October 1, 1893, father F.M. Smith, and his son Harry, came to Day County. The duo formed a newspaper, titled the “Day County Tribune”, which was printed with a Washington-brand printing press. The tribune was scheduled to be published every Thursday, but would sometimes be late. F.M. was the editor, publisher, and founder of the newspaper, whereas Harry was the assistant and associate editor. Their newspaper was originally headquartered in Ioland, and often contained stories about the town.

The first subscriber of the Day County Tribune was probate judge Robert Alcorn. Through the course of the newspaper's life, it went through several owners, editors, and publishers. The newspaper had a subscription rate of one dollar a year. The newspaper, alongside the county courthouse, was moved to Grand on November 13, 1893, where it continued as the Day County Tribune. The paper, without mentioning Ioland in its edition of December 21, 1893, referred to Grand as a place in her infancy, highlighted its growth in the prior two weeks, and touted the quality of the locale's water. The paper possibly lasted until 1918.

== See also ==
- Day County, Oklahoma Territory
- Grand, Oklahoma
- List of ghost towns in Oklahoma
