= Slapout, Oklahoma =

Unincorporated community in Oklahoma, US

- Unincorporated community
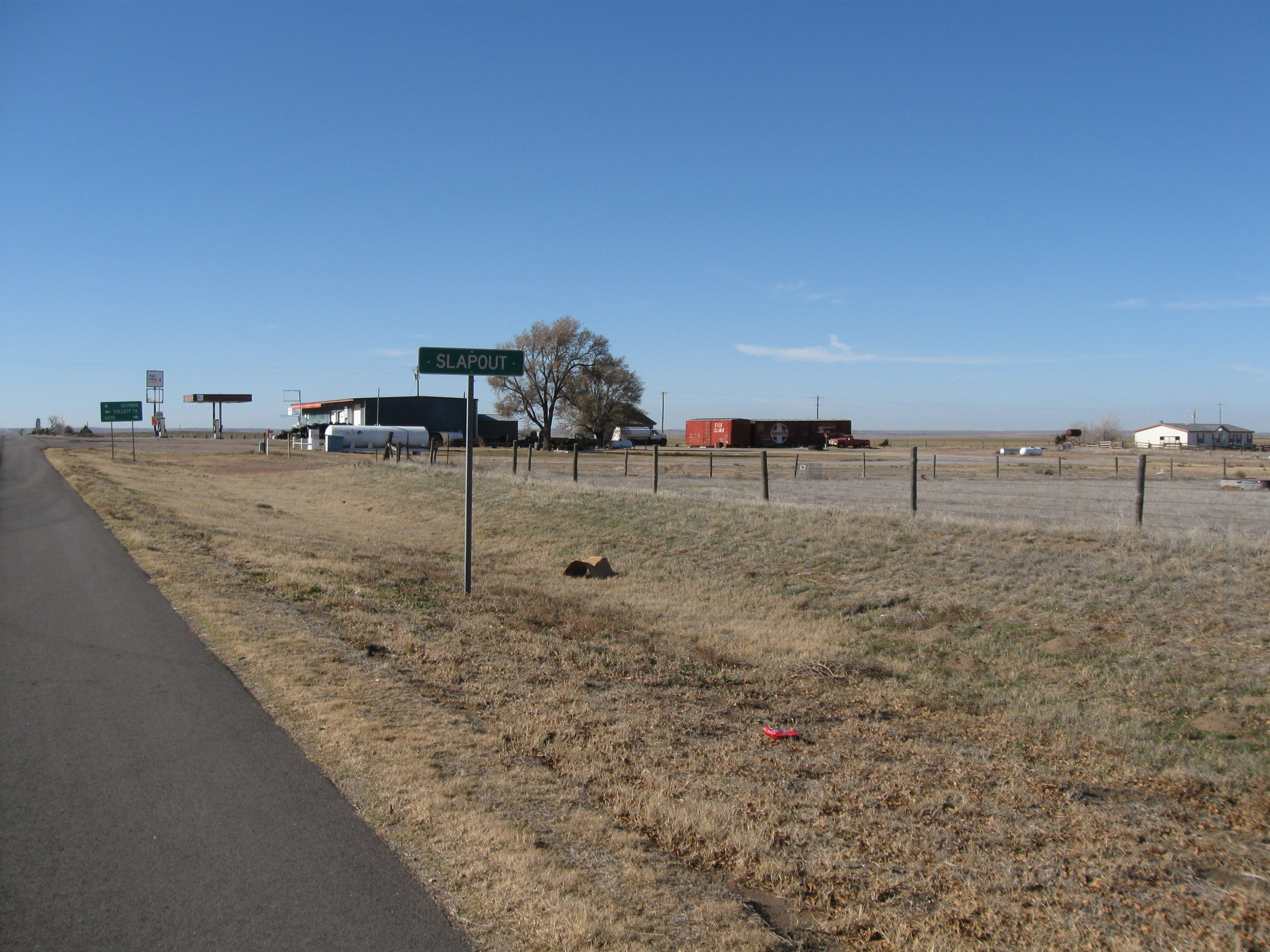

- Location within the state of Oklahoma Slapout, Oklahoma (the United States)
- Coordinates: 36°36′56″N 100°6′29″W
- Country: United States
- State: Oklahoma
- County: Beaver
- Elevation: 2,450 ft (750 m)

Population (2000)
  - Total: 4
- Time zone: UTC-6 (Central (CST))
  - Summer (DST): UTC-5 (CDT)

Slapout is an unincorporated community in Beaver County, Oklahoma, United States. The town is west of May and east of Elmwood on U.S. Route 412.

== History ==
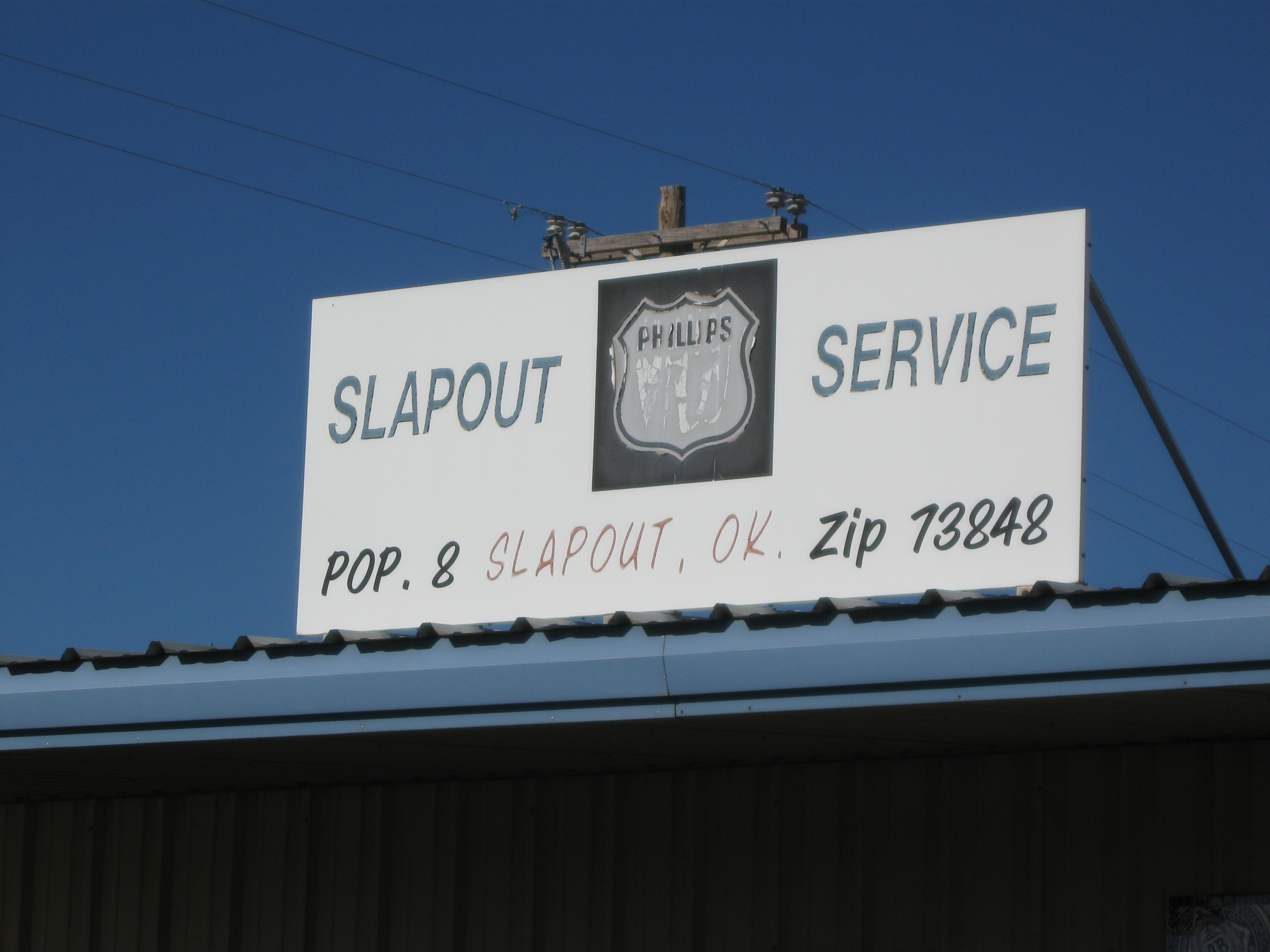
Sign in Slapout

The land upon which part of Slapout sits was homesteaded by Joseph L. Johnston. It sits on the northwest corner of the land Johnson had acquired with a government claim in 1904, three years before Oklahoma became a state.

With the construction of Oklahoma State Highway 3 across Oklahoma during the Great Depression, Tom Lemmons, who had bought the Johnson homestead, moved a chicken coop to where the highway passed his land. In the chicken coop, he started a store. He told the Tulsa Tribune he had nothing else to do during the depression, so he thought he would start a town. He named his town Nye, after the Progressive U.S. Senator Gerald Nye (R-ND).

The name Slapout, according to local legend, came about because customers at the store in Nye were often told by Lemmon's sister that the store was "slap out" of whatever they wanted. Tom Lemmons insisted his sister never used the phrase; however, the name stuck. When Tom continued to insist his side of the highway was called Nye, patrons responded that the south side of the highway could be "Slapout", and that the north side with Lemmon's store could be "Nye Out."

Tom Lemmons finally gave in when a tornado came through town and only took out his Nye sign. After that, both sides were known as Slapout. At one time, the town had 10 inhabitants and included the Hagan Grocery on the south side of the highway. Lemmons also built a building to house his rock collection.

Today, the gas station in Slapout is a regular stop for Tulsa and Oklahoma City residents traveling to Colorado.

The town was featured in a newspaper photo essay by Robert R. Mercer in the Tulsa Tribune in the 1970s.

== See also ==
- Slapout, Alabama
