= Arnett Independent School District =

School district in Oklahoma

Location
- Arnett, Oklahoma United States

District information
- Type: Public

Other information
- Website: www.arnett.k12.ok.us

The Arnett Independent School District is a school district based in Arnett, Oklahoma United States. It contains an elementary school and a combined middle/high school.

== See also ==
List of school districts in Oklahoma
