= Gage Airport =

Airport in Oklahoma, United States of America

- IATA: GAG; ICAO: KGAG; FAA LID: GAG

Summary
- Airport type: Public
- Owner: Town of Gage
- Serves: Gage, Oklahoma
- Elevation AMSL: 2,223 ft (678 m)
- Coordinates: 36°17′44″N 099°46′35″W

Map
- Location of airport in Oklahoma GAG (the United States)

Runways
Direction	Length		Surface
Direction	ft	m	Surface
17/35	5,415	1,650	Asphalt

Statistics (2011)
- Aircraft operations: 200
- Based aircraft: 7
- Source: Federal Aviation Administration

Gage Airport (IATA: GAG, ICAO: KGAG, FAA LID: GAG) is a town owned, public use airport located two nautical miles (4 km) southwest of the central business district of Gage, a town in Ellis County, Oklahoma, United States. It is included in the National Plan of Integrated Airport Systems for 2011–2015, which categorized it as a general aviation facility.

== Facilities and aircraft ==
Gage Airport covers an area of 780 acres (316 ha) at an elevation of 2,223 feet (678 m) above mean sea level. It has one runway designated 17/35 with an asphalt surface measuring 5,415 by 100 feet (1,650 x 30 m).

For the 12-month period ending June 2, 2011, the airport had 200 general aviation aircraft operations, an average of 16 per month. At that time there were 7 aircraft based at this airport, all ultralight.

== See also ==
- List of airports in Oklahoma
