= Fargo, Oklahoma =

- Town
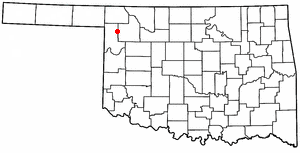
- Location of Fargo, Oklahoma
- Coordinates: 36°22′27″N 99°37′20″W
- Country: United States
- State: Oklahoma
- County: Ellis

Area
  - Total: 0.58 sq mi (1.51 km^{2})
  - Land: 0.58 sq mi (1.51 km^{2})
  - Water: 0 sq mi (0.00 km^{2})
- Elevation: 2,113 ft (644 m)

Population (2020)
  - Total: 312
  - Density: 535.5/sq mi (206.74/km^{2})
- Time zone: UTC-6 (Central (CST))
  - Summer (DST): UTC-5 (CDT)
- ZIP code: 73840
- Area code: 580
- FIPS code: 40-25450
- GNIS feature ID: 2412621

Fargo is a town in Ellis County, Oklahoma, United States. The population was 312 at the time of the 2020 census. Fargo, like many towns in the region, has never fully recovered from the Dust Bowl years.

== History ==
In 1887, the Southern Kansas Railway (a subsidiary of the Atchison, Topeka and Santa Fe Railway) built tracks through the area. The area was opened to European-American settlement by the Cherokee Outlet Opening land run in 1893.

During the land run, David C. Ooley filed a claim on land near Boggy Creek and opened a general store there. He later acquired 80 additional acres along the railroad and built a second store, and acquired postal designation as Whitehead in October 1893. The town's postal designation was changed to Oleta in August 1901, and changed again to Fargo in February 1905.

When Oklahoma's statehood was established in 1907, Fargo was incorporated from Oleta Township, with a population of 436.

In 1909, a fire destroyed all of the east side buildings on Main Street.

== Geography ==
Oklahoma State Highway 15, running generally southwest-northeast, passes through the locale, with S County Rd 190 serving as the north-south Main Street through town. Fargo is northeast of Gage and southwest of Woodward off State 15.

West Woodward Airport is about 9 miles northeast of town.

According to the United States Census Bureau, the town has a total area of 0.6 square miles (1.6 km^{2}), all land.

== Demographics ==
Historical population
Census	Pop.	Note	%±
1910	341		—
1920	258		−24.3%
1930	325		26.0%
1940	291		−10.5%
1950	318		9.3%
1960	291		−8.5%
1970	262		−10.0%
1980	409		56.1%
1990	299		−26.9%
2000	326		9.0%
2010	364		11.7%
2020	312		−14.3%
U.S. Decennial Census

=== 2020 census ===
As of the 2020 census, Fargo had a population of 312. The median age was 39.0 years. 26.0% of residents were under the age of 18 and 16.7% of residents were 65 years of age or older. For every 100 females there were 96.2 males, and for every 100 females age 18 and over there were 90.9 males age 18 and over.

0.0% of residents lived in urban areas, while 100.0% lived in rural areas.

There were 127 households in Fargo, of which 38.6% had children under the age of 18 living in them. Of all households, 49.6% were married-couple households, 11.0% were households with a male householder and no spouse or partner present, and 31.5% were households with a female householder and no spouse or partner present. About 21.2% of all households were made up of individuals and 11.0% had someone living alone who was 65 years of age or older.

There were 145 housing units, of which 12.4% were vacant. The homeowner vacancy rate was 3.2% and the rental vacancy rate was 20.5%.

Racial composition as of the 2020 census
Race	Number	Percent
White	250	80.1%
Black or African American	0	0.0%
American Indian and Alaska Native	11	3.5%
Asian	2	0.6%
Native Hawaiian and Other Pacific Islander	0	0.0%
Some other race	23	7.4%
Two or more races	26	8.3%
Hispanic or Latino (of any race)	43	13.8%

=== 2000 census ===
As of the census of 2000, there were 326 people, 124 households, and 93 families residing in the town. The population density was 556.5 inhabitants per square mile (214.9/km^{2}). There were 146 housing units at an average density of 249.2 per square mile (96.2/km^{2}). The racial makeup of the town was 90.80% White, 3.07% Native American, and 6.13% from two or more races. Hispanic or Latino of any race were 1.84% of the population.

There were 124 households, out of which 40.3% had children under the age of 18 living with them, 62.9% were married couples living together, 6.5% had a female householder with no husband present, and 25.0% were non-families. 24.2% of all households were made up of individuals, and 12.9% had someone living alone who was 65 years of age or older. The average household size was 2.63 and the average family size was 3.10.

In the town, the population was spread out, with 31.3% under the age of 18, 7.4% from 18 to 24, 26.4% from 25 to 44, 24.2% from 45 to 64, and 10.7% who were 65 years of age or older. The median age was 35 years. For every 100 females, there were 90.6 males. For every 100 females age 18 and over, there were 91.5 males.

The median income for a household in the town was $29,750, and the median income for a family was $32,625. Males had a median income of $27,083 versus $16,042 for females. The per capita income for the town was $12,748. About 9.3% of families and 12.5% of the population were below the poverty line, including 25.0% of those under age 18 and none of those age 65 or over.

== Education ==
In the summer of 2016, Fargo Public Schools consolidated with Gage Public Schools.

== Parks, recreation and attractions ==
Fargo City Park features include a working windmill and tank, a children's playground, and a covered walking bridge.

Fort Supply Lake is to the north-northeast of town.

The Stock Exchange Bank on Main Street is on the National Register of Historic Places listings in Ellis County, Oklahoma.

== Wind energy ==
The OU Spirit windfarm (a/k/a Keenan I) is east-southeast of Fargo; and has 101 MW capacity.

The Keenan II windfarm is southeast of Fargo, and has 152 MW capacity.
