= Ellis County, Oklahoma =

County in Oklahoma, United States

- County
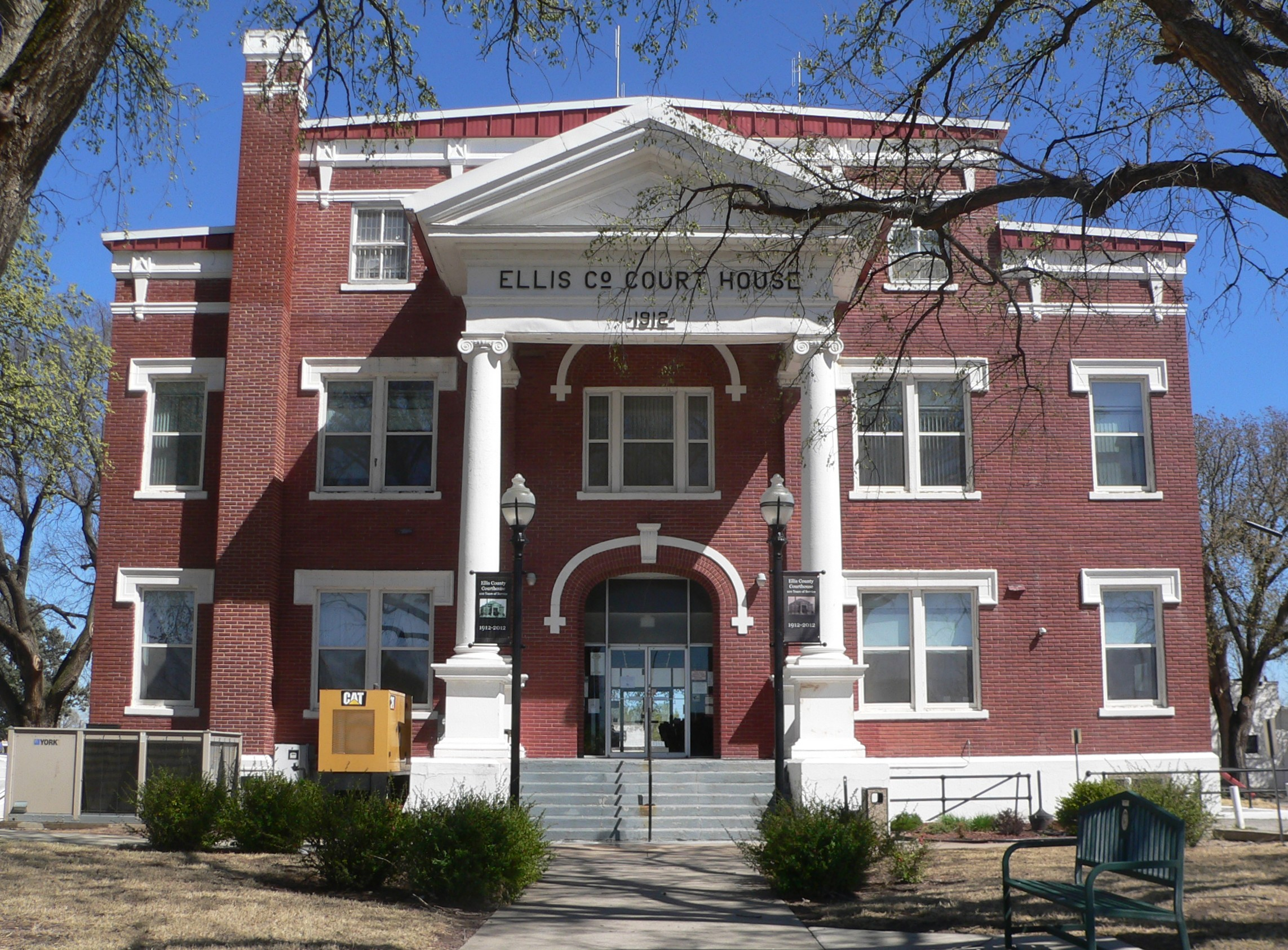
- Ellis County Courthouse in Arnett

- Location within the U.S. state of Oklahoma
- Coordinates: 36°13′N 99°45′W
- Country: United States
- State: Oklahoma
- Founded: 1907
- Named for: Albert H. Ellis
- Seat: Arnett
- Largest town: Shattuck

Area
  - Total: 1,232 sq mi (3,190 km^{2})
  - Land: 1,232 sq mi (3,190 km^{2})
  - Water: 0.4 sq mi (1.0 km^{2}) 0.03%

Population (2020)
  - Total: 3,749
  - Estimate (2025): 3,613 ▼
  - Density: 3.043/sq mi (1.175/km^{2})
- Time zone: UTC−6 (Central)
  - Summer (DST): UTC−5 (CDT)
- Congressional district: 3rd

Ellis County is a county located on the western border of the U.S. state of Oklahoma. As of the 2020 census, the population was 3,749, making it the fifth-least populous county in Oklahoma. Its county seat is Arnett.

The county was named for Albert H. Ellis, vice president of the 1906 Constitutional Convention.

== History ==
This area was used by indigenous tribes that included the Comanche, Kiowa, Apache, Cheyenne, and Arapaho. In 1820, an expedition led by Stephen Long passed through the area while exploring the Canadian River all the way to Fort Smith, Arkansas. Conflicts broke out between the Native Americans and the white settlers that were rapidly moving into Texas. In May 1858, the governor of Texas sent a force of Texas Rangers, militia and allied Indians (notably the Tonkawas), led by Captain John S. "Rip" Ford into Indian Territory. Ford's command fought a battle known as either the Battle of Little Robe Creek or the Battle of Antelope Hills inside the present Ellis County. The battle was notable because it resulted in killing the Comanche chief, Iron Jacket, father of Peta Nocona and grandfather of Quanah Parker.

After the Civil War, roads and railroads turned the Ellis County area into a transportation corridor. A military road connected Fort Supply in Oklahoma with Fort Elliott in Texas. During the 1880s, the Great Western Cattle Trail, running between Texas and Kansas, intersected the military road near the present town of Fargo. The Southern Kansas Railway, later owned by the Atchison, Topeka and Santa Fe Railway, built a line in 1886-7 from Kiowa, Kansas that resulted in starting three Ellis County towns: Fargo, Gage, and Shattuck.

When Oklahoma Territory was created, the present Ellis County became part of Day County. After statehood, several county boundaries changed and resulted in the elimination of Day County. The northern part became Roger Mills County, while the southwestern part of Woodward County was added to the remainder of Day County to become Ellis County. An election for location of the county seat in June 1908, resulted in a runoff between the towns of Shattuck and Arnett. The latter won the runoff election and remains the county seat.

On April 9, 1947, an F5 tornado, the sixth deadliest ever recorded in the United States, tore through Ellis County. It began near White Deer, Texas and traveled northeast for 221 miles (356 km). The damage occurred mostly in rural areas, and the towns were largely spared. The storm killed six people in Ellis County itself.

== Geography ==
According to the U.S. Census Bureau, the county has a total area of 1,232 square miles (3,190 km^{2}), of which 1,232 square miles (3,190 km^{2}) is land and 0.4 square miles (1.0 km^{2}) (0.03%) is water. The county is mostly within the Great Plains physiographic region.

The major stream is Wolf Creek, a tributary of the North Canadian River. Other waterways are Little Robe, Commission and Hackberry Creeks, tributaries of the Canadian River, which forms the southern boundary of the county. The Ellis County Wildlife Management Area, with Lake Lloyd Vincent, are in the southwestern corner of the county. Packsaddle Wildlife Management Area is in the south central part of the county, along the Canadian River.

=== Major highways ===
- U.S. Highway 60 / State Highway 51
- U.S. Highway 270 / U.S. Highway 412 / State Highway 3
- U.S. Highway 283
- State Highway 15
- State Highway 46

=== Adjacent counties ===
- Harper County (north)
- Woodward County (east)
- Dewey County (southeast)
- Roger Mills County (south)
- Hemphill County, Texas (southwest)
- Lipscomb County, Texas (west)
- Beaver County (northwest)

== Demographics ==
Historical population
Census	Pop.	Note	%±
1910	15,375		—
1920	11,673		−24.1%
1930	10,541		−9.7%
1940	8,466		−19.7%
1950	7,326		−13.5%
1960	5,427		−25.9%
1970	5,129		−5.5%
1980	5,596		9.1%
1990	4,497		−19.6%
2000	4,075		−9.4%
2010	4,151		1.9%
2020	3,749		−9.7%
2025 (est.)	3,613	▼	−3.6%
U.S. Decennial Census; 1790-1960 1900-1990; 1990-2000 2010

=== 2020 census ===
As of the 2020 United States census, the county had a population of 3,749. Of the residents, 22.9% were under the age of 18 and 23.7% were 65 years of age or older; the median age was 44.2 years. For every 100 females there were 97.0 males, and for every 100 females age 18 and over there were 95.3 males.

The racial makeup of the county was 87.2% White, 0.5% Black or African American, 1.6% American Indian and Alaska Native, 0.4% Asian, 2.7% from some other race, and 7.5% from two or more races. Hispanic or Latino residents of any race comprised 9.1% of the population.

There were 1,581 households in the county, of which 28.9% had children under the age of 18 living with them and 25.7% had a female householder with no spouse or partner present. About 31.1% of all households were made up of individuals and 16.7% had someone living alone who was 65 years of age or older.

There were 2,128 housing units, of which 25.7% were vacant. Among occupied housing units, 79.5% were owner-occupied and 20.5% were renter-occupied. The homeowner vacancy rate was 3.0% and the rental vacancy rate was 20.0%.

=== 2000 census ===
As of the census of 2000, there were 4,075 people, 1,769 households, and 1,218 families residing in the county. The population density was 3 people per square mile (1.2 people/km^{2}). There were 2,146 housing units at an average density of 2 per square mile (0.77/km^{2}). The racial makeup of the county was 96.29% White, 0.05% Black or African American, 1.20% Native American, 0.10% Asian, 0.74% from other races, and 1.62% from two or more races. 2.60% of the population were Hispanic or Latino of any race. 96.6% spoke English, 2.0% Spanish and 1.4% German as their first language.

There were 1,769 households, out of which 25.30% had children under the age of 18 living with them, 59.90% were married couples living together, 6.00% had a female householder with no husband present, and 31.10% were non-families. 29.20% of all households were made up of individuals, and 15.70% had someone living alone who was 65 years of age or older. The average household size was 2.27 and the average family size was 2.79.

In the county, the population was spread out, with 21.80% under the age of 18, 6.00% from 18 to 24, 21.60% from 25 to 44, 28.60% from 45 to 64, and 22.00% who were 65 years of age or older. The median age was 45 years. For every 100 females there were 97.70 males. For every 100 females age 18 and over, there were 95.10 males.

The median income for a household in the county was $27,951, and the median income for a family was $33,750. Males had a median income of $27,237 versus $17,772 for females. The per capita income for the county was $16,472. About 9.20% of families and 12.50% of the population were below the poverty line, including 19.50% of those under age 18 and 10.00% of those age 65 or over.

== Politics ==
Voter Registration and Party Enrollment as of June 30, 2023
Party	Number of Voters	Percentage
Democratic	320	12.89%
Republican	1,900	76.52%
Others	263	10.59%
Total	2,483	100%

United States presidential election results for Ellis County, Oklahoma
Year	Republican		Democratic		Third party(ies)	
Year	No.	%	No.	%	No.	%
1908	1,379	47.98%	1,260	43.84%	235	8.18%
1912	1,373	49.16%	918	32.87%	502	17.97%
1916	983	38.35%	960	37.46%	620	24.19%
1920	1,786	59.30%	845	28.05%	381	12.65%
1924	1,499	48.70%	879	28.56%	700	22.74%
1928	1,953	62.80%	1,122	36.08%	35	1.13%
1932	1,089	28.04%	2,795	71.96%	0	0.00%
1936	1,324	34.42%	2,493	64.80%	30	0.78%
1940	2,162	56.36%	1,657	43.20%	17	0.44%
1944	1,939	63.55%	1,104	36.18%	8	0.26%
1948	1,522	51.73%	1,420	48.27%	0	0.00%
1952	2,583	78.27%	717	21.73%	0	0.00%
1956	1,916	67.56%	920	32.44%	0	0.00%
1960	2,085	74.62%	709	25.38%	0	0.00%
1964	1,452	56.45%	1,120	43.55%	0	0.00%
1968	1,601	62.54%	533	20.82%	426	16.64%
1972	2,059	77.76%	473	17.86%	116	4.38%
1976	1,429	52.04%	1,256	45.74%	61	2.22%
1980	1,908	74.82%	561	22.00%	81	3.18%
1984	1,881	76.46%	562	22.85%	17	0.69%
1988	1,422	63.37%	786	35.03%	36	1.60%
1992	1,072	46.47%	594	25.75%	641	27.79%
1996	1,090	54.61%	619	31.01%	287	14.38%
2000	1,513	75.16%	468	23.25%	32	1.59%
2004	1,685	81.01%	395	18.99%	0	0.00%
2008	1,627	85.23%	282	14.77%	0	0.00%
2012	1,575	87.45%	226	12.55%	0	0.00%
2016	1,611	88.18%	155	8.48%	61	3.34%
2020	1,688	90.12%	162	8.65%	23	1.23%
2024	1,585	87.47%	197	10.87%	30	1.66%

== Economy ==
From the time of its founding, the economy of Ellis County has been based on farming and ranching. The most important crops have been wheat, cotton and broomcorn. In 1907, the town of Shattuck shipped more broomcorn than any other shipping point in the nation. Cattle raising had become important right after the Civil War. A major player locally was the Dominion Cattle Company, part of the Cherokee Strip Livestock Association. Although grazing leases ended with the land run, ranching and cattle feeding remained important. In the 1970s, dairying proved profitable.

== Education ==
Gage Public Schools are located in Ellis County. The Gage Public School website is http://www.gage.k12.ok.us

== Recreation ==
The 4,800 acres (1,900 ha) Ellis County WMA provides public wildlife and hunting opportunities. In 1961 the Oklahoma Department of Wildlife Conservation created the 160 acres (65 ha) Lake Lloyd Vincent by impounding Coon Creek in the WMA for boating, fishing, and swimming recreation.

== Communities ==
=== Towns ===
- Arnett (county seat)
- Fargo
- Gage
- Shattuck

=== Unincorporated communities ===
- Catesby
- Harmon

=== Ghost towns ===
- Grand
- Ioland

== See also ==
- National Register of Historic Places listings in Ellis County, Oklahoma
