= David Myers (Oklahoma politician) =

American politician

Member of the Oklahoma Senate from the 20th district
- In office 2002–2011
- Preceded by: Paul Muegge
- Succeeded by: Ann "AJ" Griffin

Personal details
- Born: David F. Myers; July 18, 1938 Ponca City, Oklahoma
- Died: November 11, 2011 (aged 73) Oklahoma City, Oklahoma
- Party: Republican
- Spouse: Sara
- Education: Oklahoma State University, B.S. chemical engineering Louisiana State University; Darden School, University of Virginia
- Profession: Chemical engineer, politician

David F. Myers (July 18, 1938 – November 11, 2011) was a Republican politician from the U.S. state of Oklahoma. He was a member of the Oklahoma Senate, representing an electoral district that includes Alfalfa, Garfield, Grant, Kay, and Noble counties.

Myers retired from ConocoPhillips in Ponca City, where he worked as a chemical engineer in the oil refining industry for 33 years. Until his death, he worked as an independent consultant for the oil industry.

== Political career ==
Myers was elected to the Oklahoma Senate on November 5, 2002, beating both Democratic Party candidate Tom Leonard and independent candidate Den Coates. Myers received 11,010 votes.

Myers was among the supporters of a tort reform bill in 2007. He was the 2008 author of a bill to expand a smoking ban to all public places.

Myers first served as the vice chair of the powerful Senate Appropriations Committee before serving as chair of the committee in 2011. He died of pneumonia on November 11, 2011.
