= Sylvan Ambrose Hart =

American mountain man (d. 1980)

- Born: Sylvan Ambrose Hart; May 10, 1906; Camargo, Indian Territory (Oklahoma), U.S.
- Died: April 29, 1980 (aged 73); Five Mile Bar, Idaho
- Resting place: Five Mile Bar, Idaho
- Other name: Buckskin Bill
- Education: University of Oklahoma
- Occupation: Mountain man

Sylvan Ambrose "Buckskin Bill" Hart (May 10, 1906 – April 29, 1980) was among the last of the mountain men in the Western United States.

The oldest of six children born in Camargo in the Oklahoma Territory, one year before it became Oklahoma, Hart worked in Texas oilfields during the Great Depression. For nearly a half century, from 1932 until his death, he lived in isolated central Idaho, on the Five Mile Bar of the Salmon River in the Frank Church River Of No Return Wilderness.

Hart attended McPherson College in McPherson, Kansas, in 1926, then studied petroleum engineering at the University of Oklahoma in 1927–28, but did not graduate. He purchased fifty acres (20 ha) of land at Five Mile Bar for one dollar, where he built a compound that included a two-story house, blacksmith shop, a stone gun turret, and a bomb shelter. The defensive structures reflected his sense of continual threat from the federal government, which peaked in 1956 when Howard Zahniser's Wilderness Act threatened to designate the Five Mile section of the Salmon River as a non-habitable Primitive Area, and he was in danger of being evicted.

Hart volunteered to serve in World War II, but due to an enlarged heart, he was assigned to a Boeing plant in Kansas where he worked on the Norden bombsight. Following the war, he returned to his compound and was employed by the National Forest Service. He farmed, hunted and fished for survival, and made his own guns, weapons, clothing and tools.

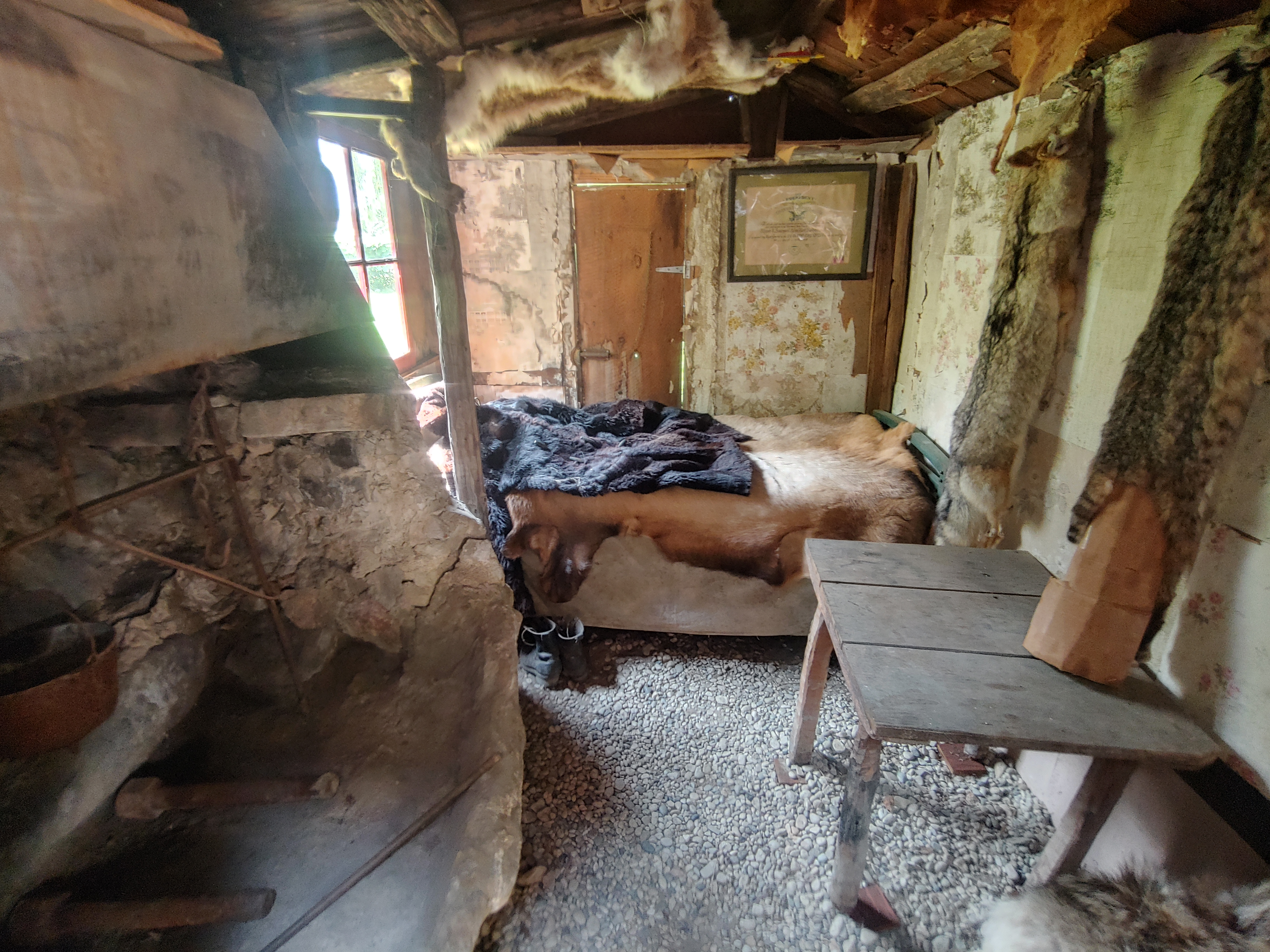
Buckskin Bill's house as part of the Museum at Five Mile Bar.

A lifelong bachelor, Hart died of natural causes at age 73 at his home in 1980. His funeral was held in Grangeville and he was buried at his home at Five Mile Bar. His compound has been preserved as The Buckskin Bill Museum.
