= Camargo, Oklahoma =

- City
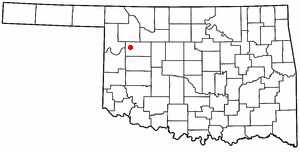
- Location of Camargo, Oklahoma
- Coordinates: 36°01′04″N 99°17′18″W
- Country: United States
- State: Oklahoma
- County: Dewey

Area
  - Total: 0.25 sq mi (0.64 km^{2})
  - Land: 0.25 sq mi (0.64 km^{2})
  - Water: 0 sq mi (0.00 km^{2})
- Elevation: 1,942 ft (592 m)

Population (2020)
  - Total: 193
  - Density: 776.6/sq mi (299.84/km^{2})
- Time zone: UTC-6 (Central (CST))
  - Summer (DST): UTC-5 (CDT)
- ZIP code: 73835
- Area code: 580
- FIPS code: 40-11150
- GNIS feature ID: 2413152

Camargo is a town in Dewey County, Oklahoma, United States. The population was 193 as of the 2020 United States census, an increase over the 178 reported at the 2010 census, and the figure of 115 reported in 2000.

== History ==
The area that became the present town of Camargo was part of the Cheyenne and Arapaho Reservation until it was opened for non-Indian settlement on April 19, 1892. A Camargo post office was established on September 16, 1892. A weekly mail route to Camargo from Ioland using the Grand post office was made in 1893.

Two stories exist about the meaning of the town name. One claims that it was named for a town in Illinois, while the other claims Camargo meant "little dog" in the Cheyenne language.

Farming and ranching sustained Camargo's early economy. The Wichita Falls and Northwestern Railway (later the Missouri, Kansas and Texas Railway, or Katy) built a line in 1912 between Leedey and Forgan (in Beaver County that passed through Camargo. Bentonite was mined in the area and shipped on the railroad until the railroad ceased operating in 1972–73.

=== Famous resident ===
Sylvan Ambrose Hart, one of the last mountain men, was born in Camargo, the eldest of six children.

== Geography ==
Camargo is located approximately halfway between Leedey and Vici on State Highway 34.

According to the United States Census Bureau, the town has a total area of 0.2 square miles (0.52 km^{2}), all land.

== Demographics ==
Historical population
Census	Pop.	Note	%±
1930	291		—
1940	289		−0.7%
1950	315		9.0%
1960	254		−19.4%
1970	236		−7.1%
1980	264		11.9%
1990	185		−29.9%
2000	115		−37.8%
2010	178		54.8%
2020	193		8.4%
U.S. Decennial Census

=== 2020 census ===
As of the 2020 census, Camargo had a population of 193. The median age was 34.3 years. 35.8% of residents were under the age of 18 and 14.5% of residents were 65 years of age or older. For every 100 females there were 96.9 males, and for every 100 females age 18 and over there were 93.8 males age 18 and over.

0.0% of residents lived in urban areas, while 100.0% lived in rural areas.

There were 71 households in Camargo, of which 42.3% had children under the age of 18 living in them. Of all households, 49.3% were married-couple households, 15.5% were households with a male householder and no spouse or partner present, and 31.0% were households with a female householder and no spouse or partner present. About 22.6% of all households were made up of individuals and 16.9% had someone living alone who was 65 years of age or older.

There were 94 housing units, of which 24.5% were vacant. The homeowner vacancy rate was 0.0% and the rental vacancy rate was 14.3%.

Racial composition as of the 2020 census
Race	Number	Percent
White	161	83.4%
Black or African American	0	0.0%
American Indian and Alaska Native	15	7.8%
Asian	0	0.0%
Native Hawaiian and Other Pacific Islander	0	0.0%
Some other race	0	0.0%
Two or more races	17	8.8%
Hispanic or Latino (of any race)	5	2.6%

=== 2000 census ===
As of the 2000 census, there were 115 people, 57 households, and 33 families residing in the town. The population density was 466.6 inhabitants per square mile (180.2/km^{2}). There were 85 housing units at an average density of 344.9 per square mile (133.2/km^{2}). The racial makeup of the town was 99.13% White, and 0.87% from two or more races. Hispanic or Latino of any race were 1.74% of the population.

There were 57 households, out of which 22.8% had children under the age of 18 living with them, 42.1% were married couples living together, 10.5% had a female householder with no husband present, and 42.1% were non-families. 42.1% of all households were made up of individuals, and 24.6% had someone living alone who was 65 years of age or older. The average household size was 2.02 and the average family size was 2.76.

In the town, the population was spread out, with 20.9% under the age of 18, 11.3% from 18 to 24, 17.4% from 25 to 44, 27.8% from 45 to 64, and 22.6% who were 65 years of age or older. The median age was 45 years. For every 100 females, there were 91.7 males. For every 100 females age 18 and over, there were 78.4 males.

The median income for a household in the town was $23,750, and the median income for a family was $36,875. Males had a median income of $32,083 versus $28,125 for females. The per capita income for the town was $20,417. There were 20.6% of families and 24.3% of the population living below the poverty line, including 20.0% of under eighteens and 46.7% of those over 64.
