= Ceres, Oklahoma =

Unincorporated community in Oklahoma, US

Coordinates: 36°28′38″N 97°16′57″W

Ceres (locally /ˈsɪərz/) is an unincorporated community in Noble County, Oklahoma, United States. It is located north of Perry, south of Tonkawa, east-northeast of Enid and southwest of Ponca City, off U.S. 77 and SH-15.

The town was named McKinney shortly after the Land Run of 1893. But it was renamed Ceres a few years later, after the mythological goddess of harvest.

The depression-era WPA Guide to Oklahoma: The Sooner State described Ceres as a settlement having a population of 10, two stores and a filling station, yet the town has survived into the 21st century.
