= Day County, Oklahoma Territory =

Coordinates: 36.0°N 99.7°W

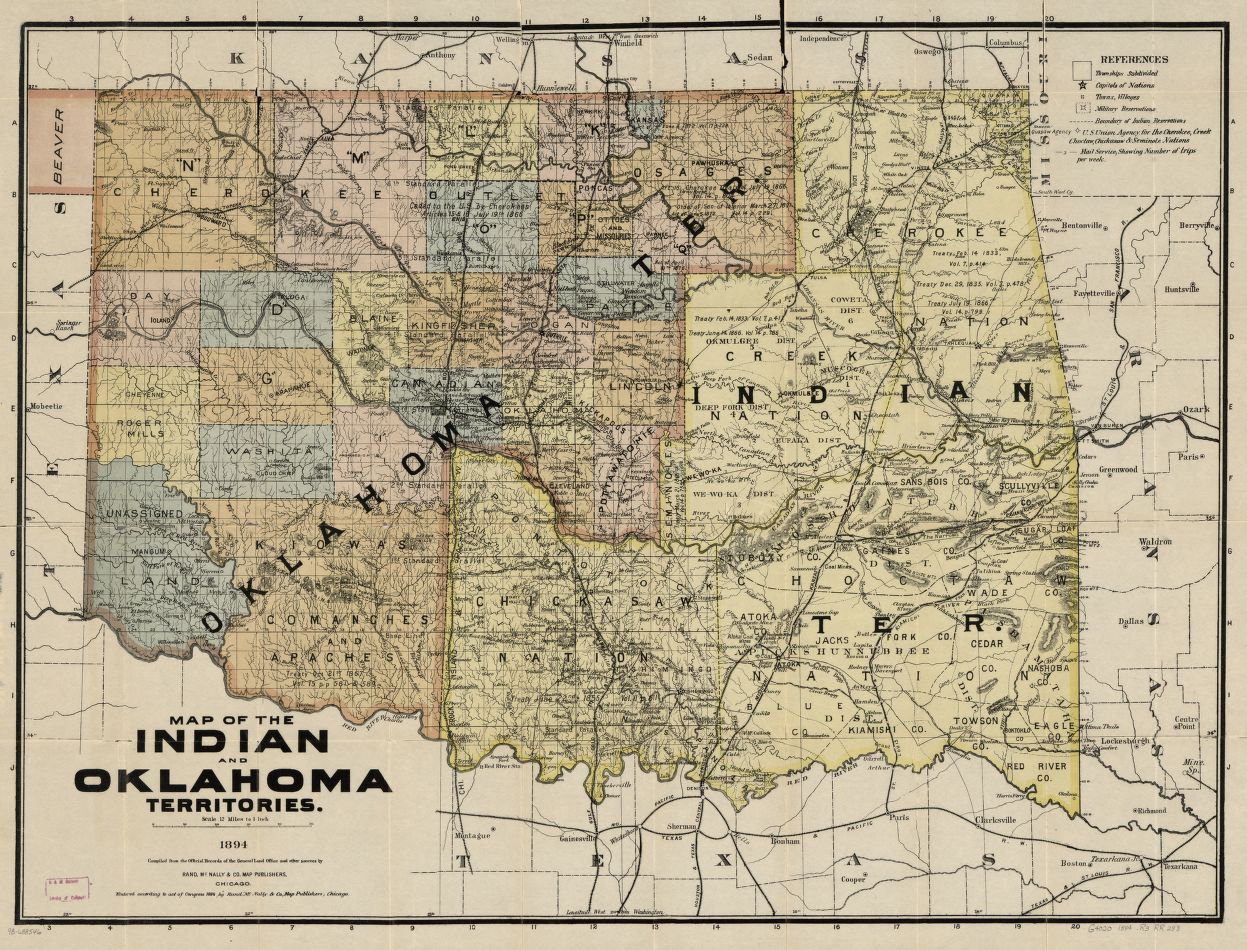
Oklahoma & Indian Territories in 1894

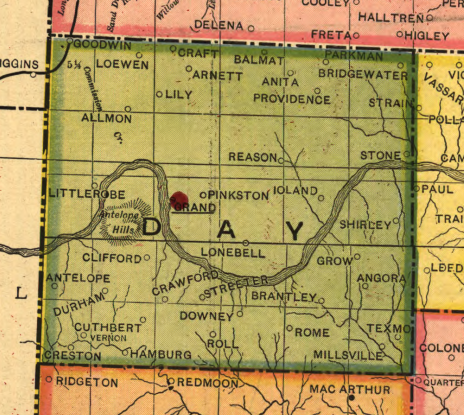
Map of Day County in 1905

Day County was one of the original counties of Oklahoma Territory. Day County was in the western part of the territory, along the Texas border. When it was originally established in 1890, it was known as E County (several Oklahoma counties carried only letter designations at the time). It was later named for Charles Day, the contractor who built the first courthouse in the county seat, the now-defunct town of Ioland, Oklahoma. (Note: Although no remains are visible, the coordinates for Ioland's site are Latitude: 35.943937 and Longitude: -99.521782.)

== History ==
Before the creation of Oklahoma Territory, the land that would become known as County E was simply that part of the Cheyenne-Arapaho reservation bounded on the north by the Cherokee Outlet and Roger Mills County.

=== County seat controversy ===
The community of Ioland was named as the temporary county seat when County E was first established in 1890, but this location proved unsatisfactory for several reasons. First, the water tasted bad, and no better source was available. (Note: Local residents apparently called it "gyp water" because it contained so much gypsum) Second, Ioland was not a convenient location for the majority of county residents, who lived on the other side of the Canadian River. Third, the temporary courthouse at Ioland mysteriously burned down during the night of November 12, 1893. (Note: Some county officials were accused of complicity in the investigation of the fire, but no one was ever convicted.) The day after the fire, the three county commissioners ordered that the county seat be re-established at Grand. (Note: The legality of this move continued to be questioned until Day County ceased to exist, when Oklahoma became a state on November 16, 1907. According to Squire, who had thoroughly searched the old records, courts had held that Ioland was the county seat de jure, and that Grand was county seat de facto.)

The county commissioners voted to move the seat to Grand, Oklahoma, along the banks of the Canadian River, which ran through the middle of the county.

=== "Free Grass" vs. "Herd Law" ===
The burning political issue in Day County was the question whether land should be free-range (i. e., unfenced) or whether the movement of cattle should be restricted. (Note: The source described this controversy as a question of "Free Grass" versus "Herd Law.") Most of the large cattle ranches had started when the land was still controlled by Texas. However, Texas law did not apply when the U. S. created Oklahoma Territory (thus giving rise to Day County). Most of the settlers who moved in during the territorial days were small farmers. Initially, the cattlemen had the political advantage. If a farmer found that free-range cattle had eaten his crops, he had no recourse to be compensated for his loss. As a result, many charges were made by cattlemen that some farmers had put poison in the waters where cattle drank. The Arapaho Bee reported on May 17, 1901, that a posse of cattlemen lynched a resident of Ioland, after he had been accused of poisoning roaming cattle.

=== Dissolution of county ===
When Oklahoma was granted statehood, effective November 16, 1907, Day County was abolished and several county lines were redrawn. Among the changes were Day County being split along the Canadian River. The section of the county north of the river became part of Ellis County, while the area south of the river is now northern Roger Mills County. Also, a narrow strip of land in the northeast of the old county now falls within the boundaries of Woodward County.

Grand, now a defunct town, served as county seat of Ellis County until a 1908 election moved that function to the town of Arnett. Grand's townsite is 14 miles (23 km) south of Arnett. Most of the inhabitants moved away by 1914. No remains are visible at the townsite.

== Geography ==
Day County encompassed the Antelope Hills, a historical landmark.

=== Adjoining political entities ===
- North – Ellis County, O.T.
- East – County D, O.T. (later named Dewey County)
- Southeast – County G, O.T.(later named Custer County)
- South – Roger Mills County, O.T.
- West – Texas panhandle

=== Present-day towns formerly part of Day County ===
- Arnett
- Angora
- Crawford
- Durham
- Goodwin
- Roll
