= Olin Branstetter =

American politician

Member of the Oklahoma Senate from the 20th district
- In office 1986–1990
- Preceded by: William P. O’Connor
- Succeeded by: Paul Muegge

Personal details
- Born: June 30, 1929 Harmon, Oklahoma, U.S.
- Died: November 17, 2011 (aged 82) Perry County, Arkansas, U.S.
- Party: Republican
- Occupation: businessman and politician

Olin Richard Branstetter (June 30, 1929 – November 17, 2011) was an American businessman and politician.

Branstetter was born in Harmon, Oklahoma and grew up in Arnett, Oklahoma. He graduated from Oklahoma State University (OSU) with a degree in agriculture in 1952. He was a Korean War veteran. Branstetter was involved in the real estate and oil production businesses. He served in the Oklahoma State Senate.

== Death ==
Branstetter and his wife Paula were killed in an aviation accident on November 17, 2011, when the Piper PA-28 Cherokee light aircraft he was piloting crashed near Perryville, Arkansas, killing all four on board. The pair was flying OSU women's basketball head coach Kurt Budke and assistant coach Miranda Serna to North Little Rock, Arkansas, on a recruiting trip. The subsequent investigation found no evidence of mechanical failure and concluded that the pilot had lost control of the aircraft, although the reason for the loss of control could not be established.
