= Oklahoma State Highway 15 =

State highway in Oklahoma, United States

State Highway 15

Route information
- Maintained by ODOT

Section 1
- Length: 47.1 mi (75.8 km)
- West end: SH 15 at the Texas state line near Follett, TX
- Major intersections: US 283 in Shattuck
- East end: US 183 / US 412 / US 270 / SH-3 in Woodward

Section 2
- Length: 62.4 mi (100.4 km)
- West end: US 64 / US 412 / SH-74 east of Enid
- Major intersections: I-35 near Billings; US 77 in Ceres; US 177 near Watchorn
- East end: SH-18 north of Pawnee

Location
- Country: United States
- State: Oklahoma

Highway system
- Oklahoma State Highway System; Interstate; US; State; Turnpikes
← SH-14	→ SH-16

State Highway 15 (abbreviated SH-15 or OK-15) is the name for two once-connected state highways in Oklahoma. One begins at the Texas state line and runs for 47.1 miles (75.8 km) through Woodward; the other runs for 62.4 miles (100.4 km) between U.S. Highway 64/U.S. Highway 412 and State Highway 18 north of Pawnee. SH-15 has no lettered spur routes.

== Route descriptions ==
=== Western section ===
The western SH-15 begins at the Texas state line, connecting to Texas' State Highway 15 between Catesby and Shattuck. It runs east for seven miles (11 km) to US-283, which it overlaps into Shattuck. In Shattuck, SH-15 splits off to the northeast, heading through Gage and Fargo, before ending in Woodward.

=== Eastern section ===
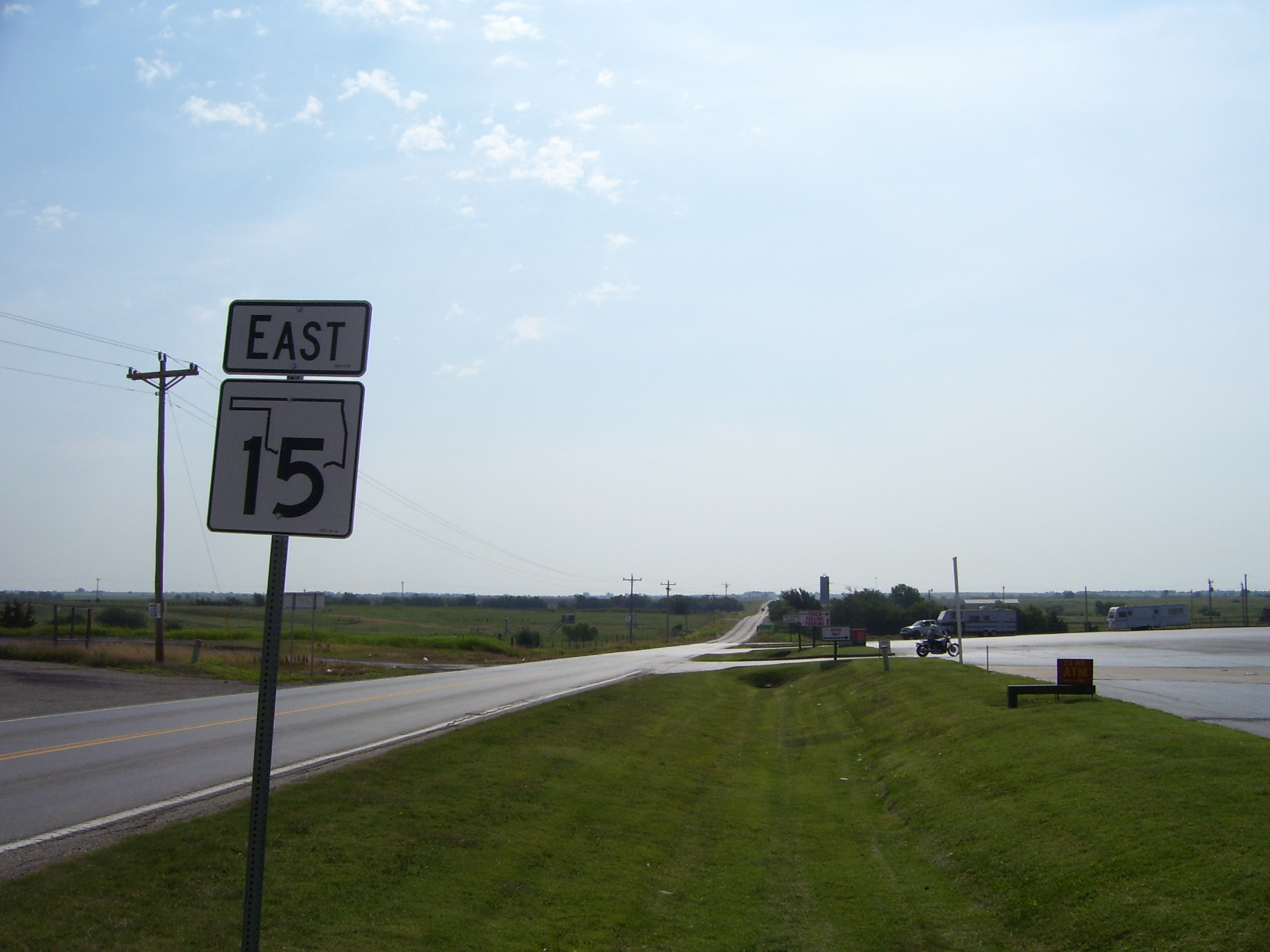
SH-15 just east of I-35

The eastern SH-15 picks up a US-64/412 south of Garber, and begins concurrent with State Highway 74 heading northbound. It splits from SH-74 to head through Billings and has an interchange with Interstate 35 at milemarker 203. It then has a five-mile (8.0 km) concurrency with U.S. Highway 77. After leaving US-77, it passes through Red Rock, and has a 4 miles (6.4 km) concurrency with US-177, and splits off just north of the intersection with the Cimarron Turnpike. It bridges Sooner Lake and runs for 15 more miles (24 more km) before ending at State Highway 18 north of Pawnee.

== History ==
The two sections of SH-15 were once connected into one highway. However, when U.S. Highway 412 was commissioned, the middle section of highway (from Woodward to Garber) was redesignated as US-412, and SH-15 decommissioned through that section.

== Junction list ==
=== Western section ===
County	Location	mi	km	Destinations	Notes
Ellis		0.0	0.0	SH 15	Western terminus, Texas state line
Ellis		6.5	10.5	US 283	Northern end of US-283 concurrency
Ellis	Shattuck	18.3	29.5	US 283	Southern end of US-283 concurrency
Ellis	Gage	26.2	42.2	SH-48	
Woodward	Woodward	47.1	75.8	US 183 / US 270 / US 412 / SH-3	Eastern terminus
1.000 mi = 1.609 km; 1.000 km = 0.621 mi: Concurrency terminus

=== Eastern section ===
County	Location	mi	km	Destinations	Notes
Garfield		0.0	0.0	US 64 / US 412	Western terminus (concurrent with SH-74)
Garfield		9.5	15.3	SH-74	Northern end of SH-74 concurrency
Noble		22.9	36.9	I-35	I-35 exit 203
Noble		26.4	42.5	US 77	Northern end of US-77 concurrency
Noble	Ceres	31.3	50.4	US 77	Southern end of US-77 concurrency
Noble		43.4	69.8	US 177	Northern end of US-177 concurrency
Noble		47.5	76.4	US 177	Southern end of US-177 concurrency
Pawnee		62.4	100.4	SH-18	Eastern terminus
1.000 mi = 1.609 km; 1.000 km = 0.621 mi: Concurrency terminus
