= Ingle Brothers Broomcorn Warehouse =

- U.S. National Register of Historic Places
- Location within Oklahoma Location within the United States
- Location: 320 NW 1st St., Shattuck, Oklahoma
- Coordinates: 36.276666°N 99.884026°W
- Area: less than one acre
- Built by: Meyers, L.G.
- NRHP reference No.: 09000975
- Added to NRHP: December 3, 2009

The Ingle Brothers Broomcorn Warehouse, in Shattuck, Oklahoma, was listed on the National Register of Historic Places in 2009. It is located at 320 NW 1st St., at Oklahoma Avenue, in Shattuck.

It was built in 1909. A photo shows it is a gable-front brick building with a stepped gable.
