= May, Oklahoma =

- Town
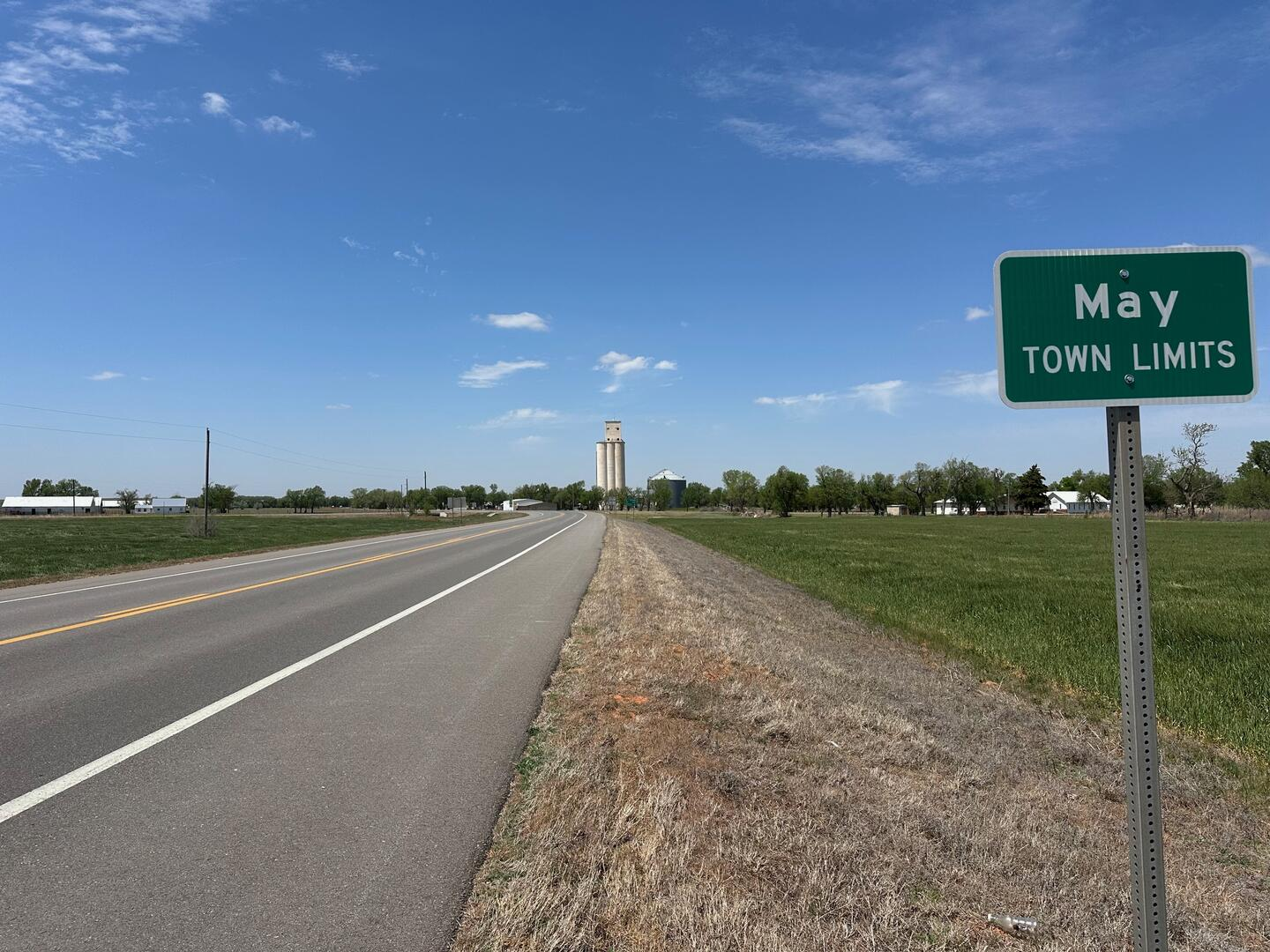
- The highway into May from the east, April 2024, with the Consolidated Grain and Barge grain elevator in far center background (now idle)

- Location in Harper County and the state of Oklahoma.
- Coordinates: 36°37′00″N 99°44′55″W
- Country: United States
- State: Oklahoma
- County: Harper

Area
  - Total: 0.17 sq mi (0.44 km^{2})
  - Land: 0.17 sq mi (0.44 km^{2})
  - Water: 0 sq mi (0.00 km^{2})
- Elevation: 2,041 ft (622 m)

Population (2020)
  - Total: 29
  - Density: 169.6/sq mi (65.49/km^{2})
- Time zone: UTC-6 (Central (CST))
  - Summer (DST): UTC-5 (CDT)
- ZIP code: 73851
- Area code: 580
- FIPS code: 40-47000
- GNIS feature ID: 2412964

May is a town in Harper County, Oklahoma, United States. As of the 2020 census, the town’s population was 29.

A store was created at the site of the town in 1893 after the Cherokee Outlet Opening; a post office was opened in July of 1896; and, the town was platted in July of 1902, although it was not formally incorporated until November of 1913. The town received a significant boost in the Spring of 1912 when the Wichita Falls and Northwestern Railway was built through, making May a wheat-shipping point. But the town significantly declined after World War II and the rail line was abandoned in 1972. As of late 2026, the post office was still open.

== Geography ==
May is located on U.S. Highway 412 at the intersection with State Highway 46, approximately 26 miles northwest of Woodward.

According to the United States Census Bureau, the town has a total area of 0.2 square miles (0.52 km^{2}), all land. May was served by the Northwestern District of the Missouri–Kansas–Texas Railroad until that line's abandonment in January 1973.

== Demographics ==
Historical population
| Census | Pop. | Note | %± |
|---|---|---|---|
| 1920 | 324 | | — |
| 1930 | 258 | | −20.4% |
| 1940 | 239 | | −7.4% |
| 1950 | 143 | | −40.2% |
| 1970 | 91 | | — |
| 1990 | 42 | | — |
| 2000 | 33 | | −21.4% |
| 2010 | 39 | | 18.2% |
| 2020 | 29 | | −25.6% |
U.S. Decennial Census

=== 2020 census ===
As of the 2020 census, May had a population of 29. The median age was 55.5 years. 3.4% of residents were under the age of 18 and 27.6% of residents were 65 years of age or older. For every 100 females there were 107.1 males, and for every 100 females age 18 and over there were 115.4 males age 18 and over.

0.0% of residents lived in urban areas, while 100.0% lived in rural areas.

There were 16 households in May, of which 25.0% had children under the age of 18 living in them. Of all households, 12.5% were married-couple households, 62.5% were households with a male householder and no spouse or partner present, and 18.8% were households with a female householder and no spouse or partner present. About 56.3% of all households were made up of individuals and 12.5% had someone living alone who was 65 years of age or older.

There were 26 housing units, of which 38.5% were vacant. The homeowner vacancy rate was 0.0% and the rental vacancy rate was 0.0%.

Racial composition as of the 2020 census
| Race | Number | Percent |
|---|---|---|
| White | 29 | 100.0% |
| Black or African American | 0 | 0.0% |
| American Indian and Alaska Native | 0 | 0.0% |
| Asian | 0 | 0.0% |
| Native Hawaiian and Other Pacific Islander | 0 | 0.0% |
| Some other race | 0 | 0.0% |
| Two or more races | 0 | 0.0% |
| Hispanic or Latino (of any race) | 0 | 0.0% |

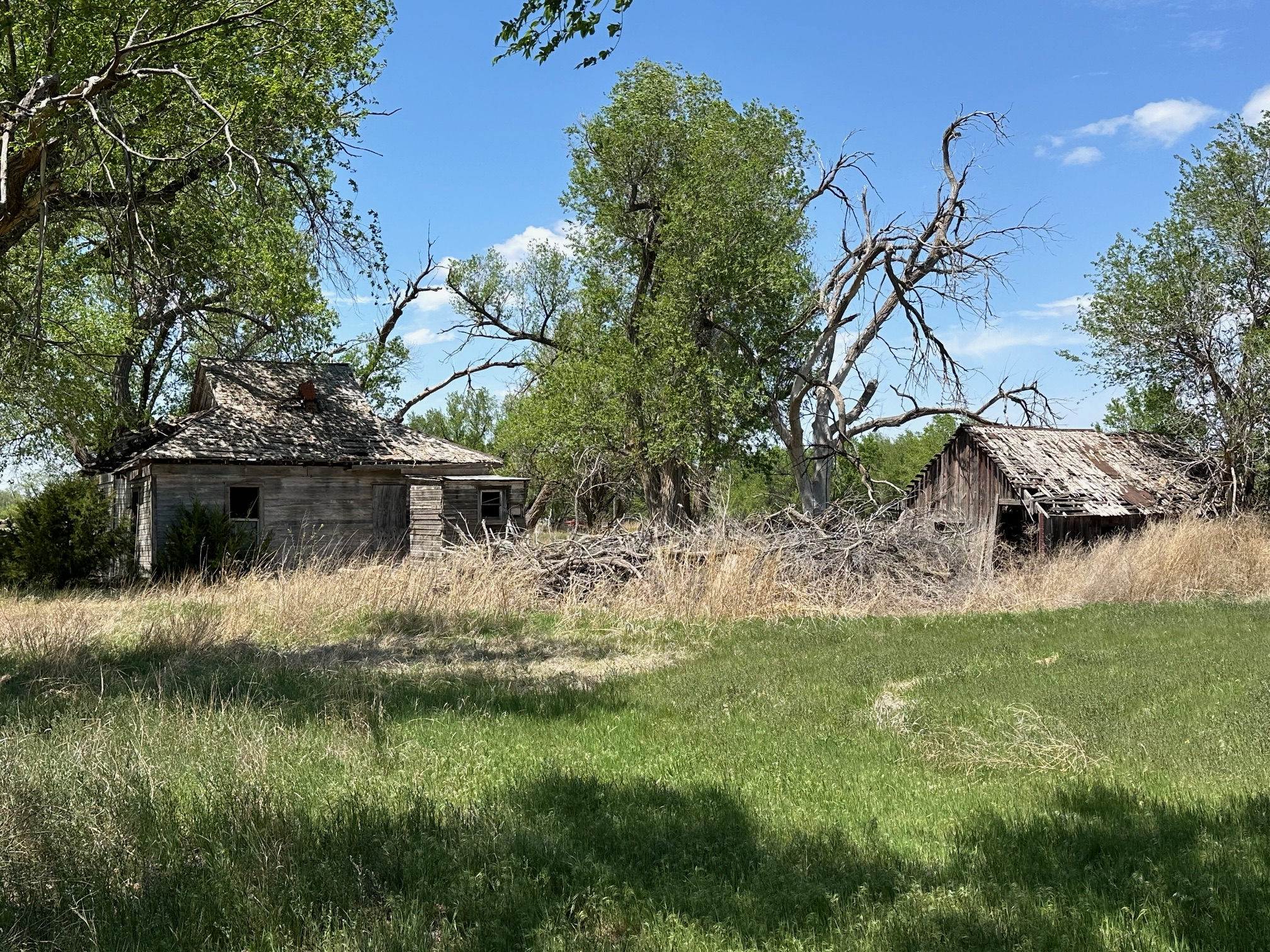
Abandoned houses in May, April 2024

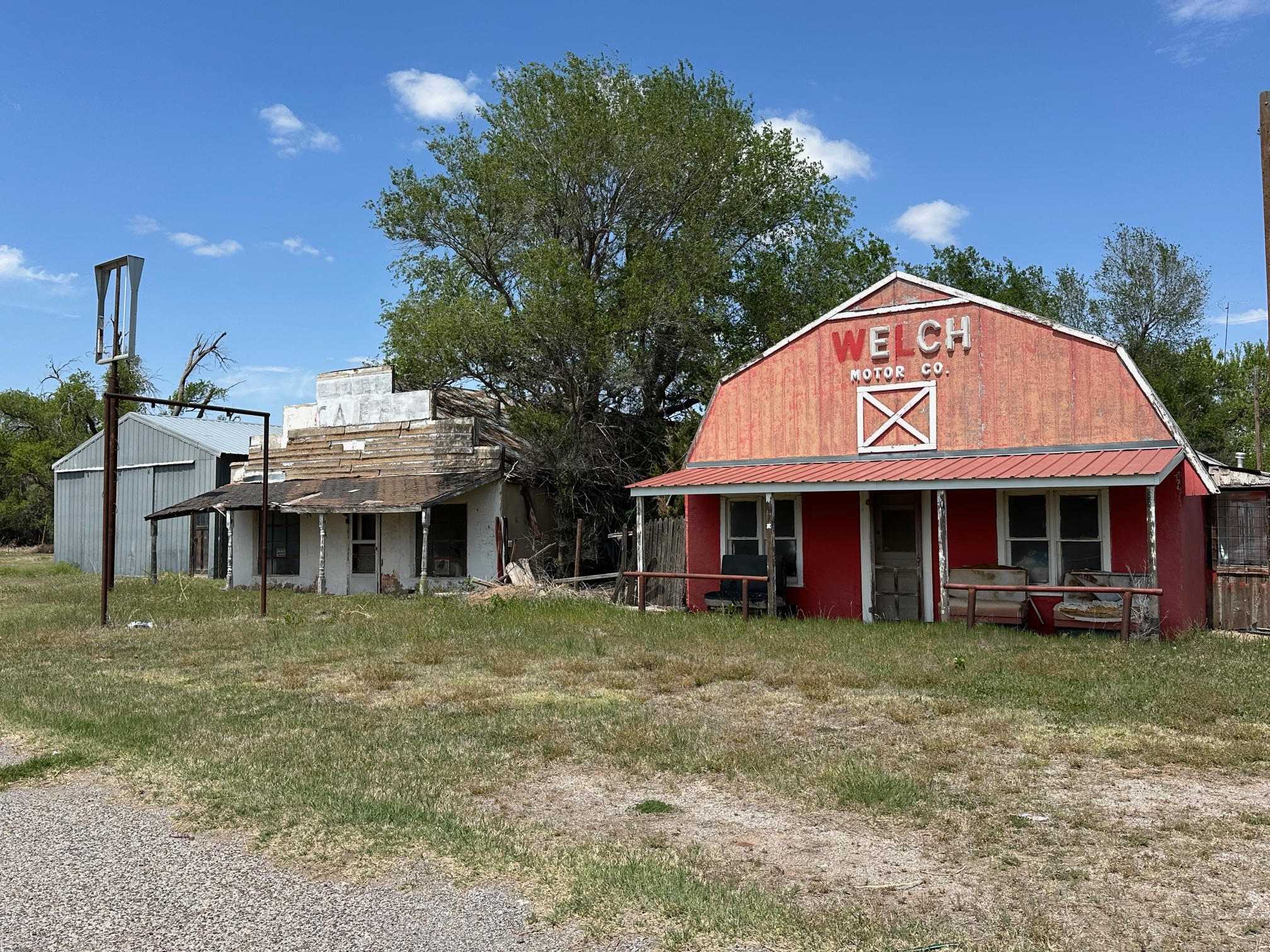
Vacant commercial buildings in May

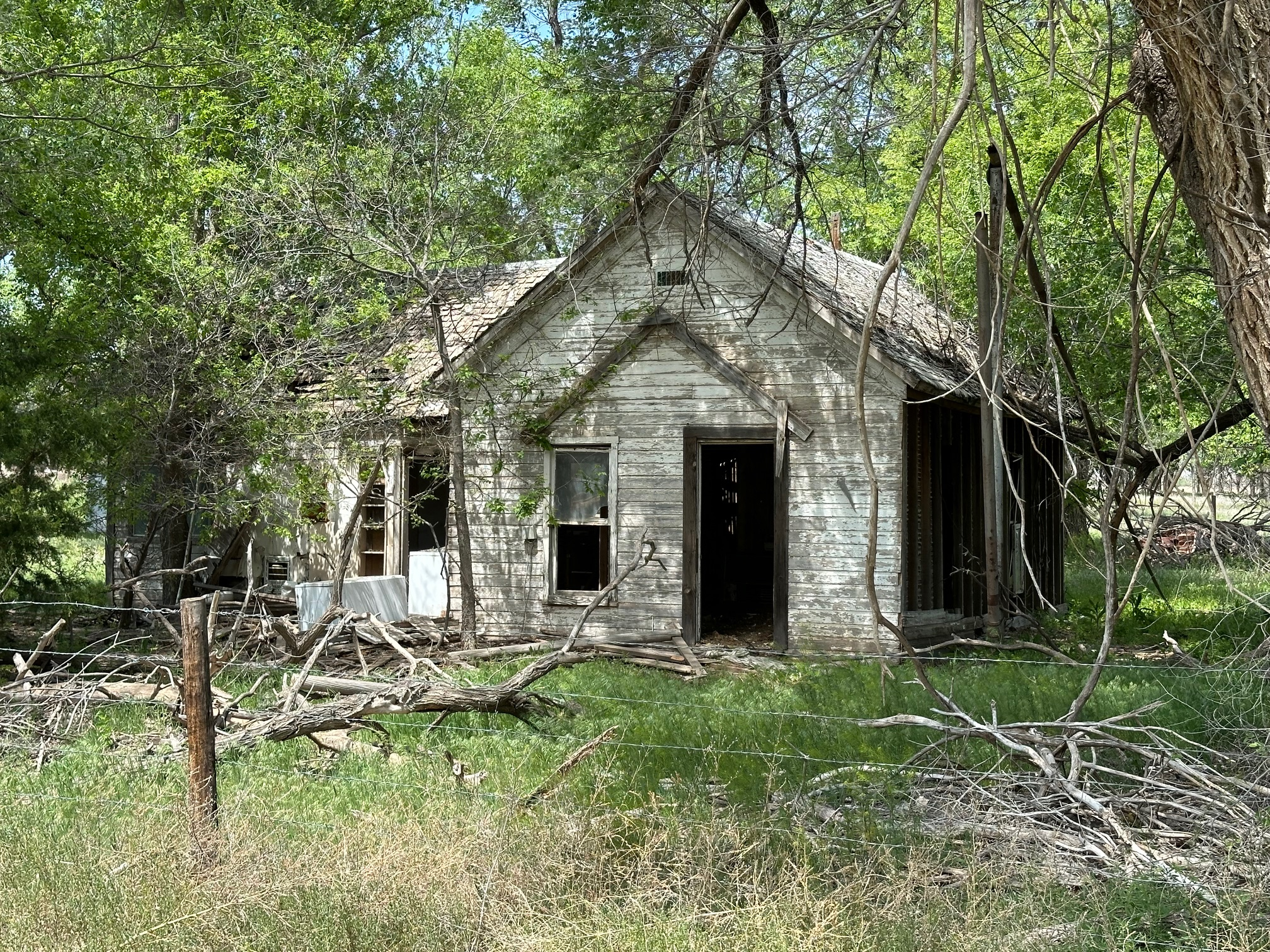
Dilapidated former home in May, in April 2024

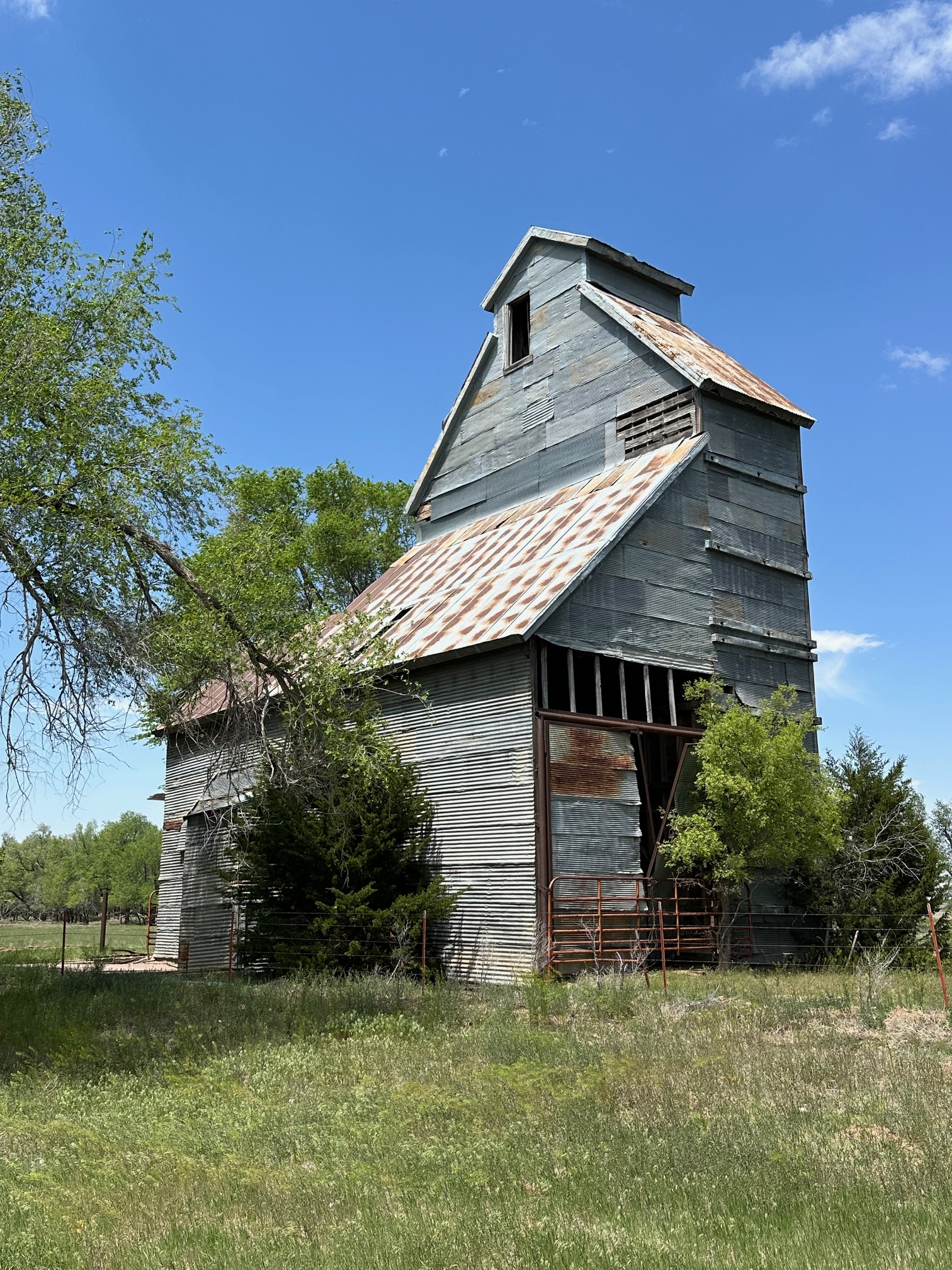
Abandoned grain silo, April 2024

== In popular culture ==
May appears in the novel The Stand by Stephen King, and neighboring Slapout, Oklahoma is mentioned.
