= Shattuck, Oklahoma =

- Town
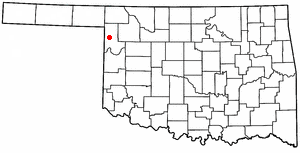
- Location of Shattuck within Oklahoma
- Coordinates: 36°16′21″N 99°52′34″W
- Country: United States
- State: Oklahoma
- County: Ellis

Area
  - Total: 2.20 sq mi (5.69 km^{2})
  - Land: 2.20 sq mi (5.69 km^{2})
  - Water: 0 sq mi (0.00 km^{2})
- Elevation: 2,307 ft (703 m)

Population (2020)
  - Total: 1,249
  - Density: 568.8/sq mi (219.61/km^{2})
- Time zone: UTC-6 (Central (CST))
  - Summer (DST): UTC-5 (CDT)
- ZIP code: 73858
- Area code: 580
- FIPS code: 40-66750
- GNIS feature ID: 2413278
- Website: shattuckok.com

Shattuck is a town in Ellis County, Oklahoma, United States. The population was 1,249 at the time of the 2020 census, a change from the 1,356 reported in the 2010 census.

== History ==
Shattuck is located in what was once the Cherokee Outlet. The Southern Kansas Railway built a railroad through the area in 1887, and there was a railroad water station called "Norice" on the site that later became Shattuck. Non-Indian settlers first arrived in the Land Run of 1893. Around the railroad station, new businesses opened to support the farmers, including a blacksmith shop, a store, a school, and a post office. The post office, which was incorporated in November 1893, was named Shattuck after a Santa Fe Railroad director. The town site was plotted 1901, and the town was incorporated in 1906.

On May 25, 2021, an earthquake magnitude 4.1 on the Richter Scale occurred a few miles west of Shattuck, despite it not being an area known for earthquakes.

== Geography ==
Shattuck is located west of the center of Ellis County. U.S. Route 283 passes through the center of town, leading north 30 miles (48 km) to Laverne and south 15 miles (24 km) to Arnett, the Ellis county seat. Oklahoma State Highway 15 passes through the southeast part of Shattuck, leading northeast 30 miles (48 km) to Woodward. The Texas border is 7 miles (11 km) west of Shattuck.

The nearest airfield, Gage Airport, is less than 9 miles east-northeast of town.

According to the United States Census Bureau, the town has a total area of 2.2 square miles (5.8 km^{2}), all land.

== Demographics ==
Historical population
Census	Pop.	Note	%±
1910	1,231		—
1920	1,365		10.9%
1930	1,490		9.2%
1940	1,275		−14.4%
1950	1,692		32.7%
1960	1,625		−4.0%
1970	1,546		−4.9%
1980	1,759		13.8%
1990	1,454		−17.3%
2000	1,274		−12.4%
2010	1,356		6.4%
2020	1,249		−7.9%
U.S. Decennial Census

=== 2020 census ===
As of the 2020 census, Shattuck had a population of 1,249. The median age was 40.7 years. 26.2% of residents were under the age of 18 and 22.8% of residents were 65 years of age or older. For every 100 females there were 94.9 males, and for every 100 females age 18 and over there were 90.5 males age 18 and over.

0.0% of residents lived in urban areas, while 100.0% lived in rural areas.

There were 501 households in Shattuck, of which 32.5% had children under the age of 18 living in them. Of all households, 50.3% were married-couple households, 16.8% were households with a male householder and no spouse or partner present, and 29.7% were households with a female householder and no spouse or partner present. About 31.6% of all households were made up of individuals and 17.4% had someone living alone who was 65 years of age or older.

There were 685 housing units, of which 26.9% were vacant. The homeowner vacancy rate was 6.1% and the rental vacancy rate was 20.9%.

Racial composition as of the 2020 census
Race	Number	Percent
White	1,026	82.1%
Black or African American	1	0.1%
American Indian and Alaska Native	28	2.2%
Asian	6	0.5%
Native Hawaiian and Other Pacific Islander	0	0.0%
Some other race	67	5.4%
Two or more races	121	9.7%
Hispanic or Latino (of any race)	179	14.3%

=== 2000 census ===
As of the census of 2000, there were 1,274 people, 567 households, and 369 families residing in the town. The population density was 880.5 inhabitants per square mile (340.0/km^{2}). There were 699 housing units at an average density of 483.1 per square mile (186.5/km^{2}).

There were 567 households, out of which 23.3% had children under the age of 18 living with them, 55.9% were married couples living together, 7.6% had a female householder with no husband present, and 34.9% were non-families. 33.2% of all households were made up of individuals, and 19.0% had someone living alone who was 65 years of age or older. The average household size was 2.16 and the average family size was 2.74.

In the town, the population was spread out, with 20.0% under the age of 18, 6.1% from 18 to 24, 20.4% from 25 to 44, 28.3% from 45 to 64, and 25.1% who were 65 years of age or older. The median age was 47 years. For every 100 females, there were 88.2 males. For every 100 females age 18 and over, there were 81.3 males.

The median income for a household in the town was $26,758, and the median income for a family was $35,250. Males had a median income of $32,375 versus $18,077 for females. The per capita income for the town was $17,420. About 7.5% of families and 10.2% of the population were below the poverty line, including 11.7% of those under age 18 and 12.7% of those age 65 or over.

== Parks, recreation and attractions ==
City Park has playground equipment, tennis courts, covered picnic facilities, and a mile-long Lighted Walking Trail at Centennial Lake. It also has Shattuck Public Swimming Pool.

The municipal/semi-private Shattuck Golf and Country Club has nine holes and was built in 1950.

Gage Beach, Oklahoma’s largest outdoor swimming pool, is seven miles east of Shattuck; the spring-fed waters of this 100-year-old pool are mineral-rich.

Lake Lloyd Vincent and the Ellis County Wildlife Management Area are well south of town, but in Shattuck’s zip code.

The Shattuck Windmill Museum has a large number of vintage windmills, as well as versions of some early settler buildings.

The following locations are NRHP-listed:

Shattuck National Bank Building was built in 1910, with a second floor added in 1913. It became the Shattuck Public Library in 1963. Wall murals inside the building depict the history of Shattuck from 1838 to the present.

The Ingle Brothers Broomcorn Warehouse was built in 1909, and is a gable-front brick building with a stepped gable.

== Notable people ==
- Terry Buffalo Ware, red dirt country guitarist, was born in Shattuck on February 14, 1950.
