= Ellis County Courthouse (Oklahoma) =

- U.S. National Register of Historic Places
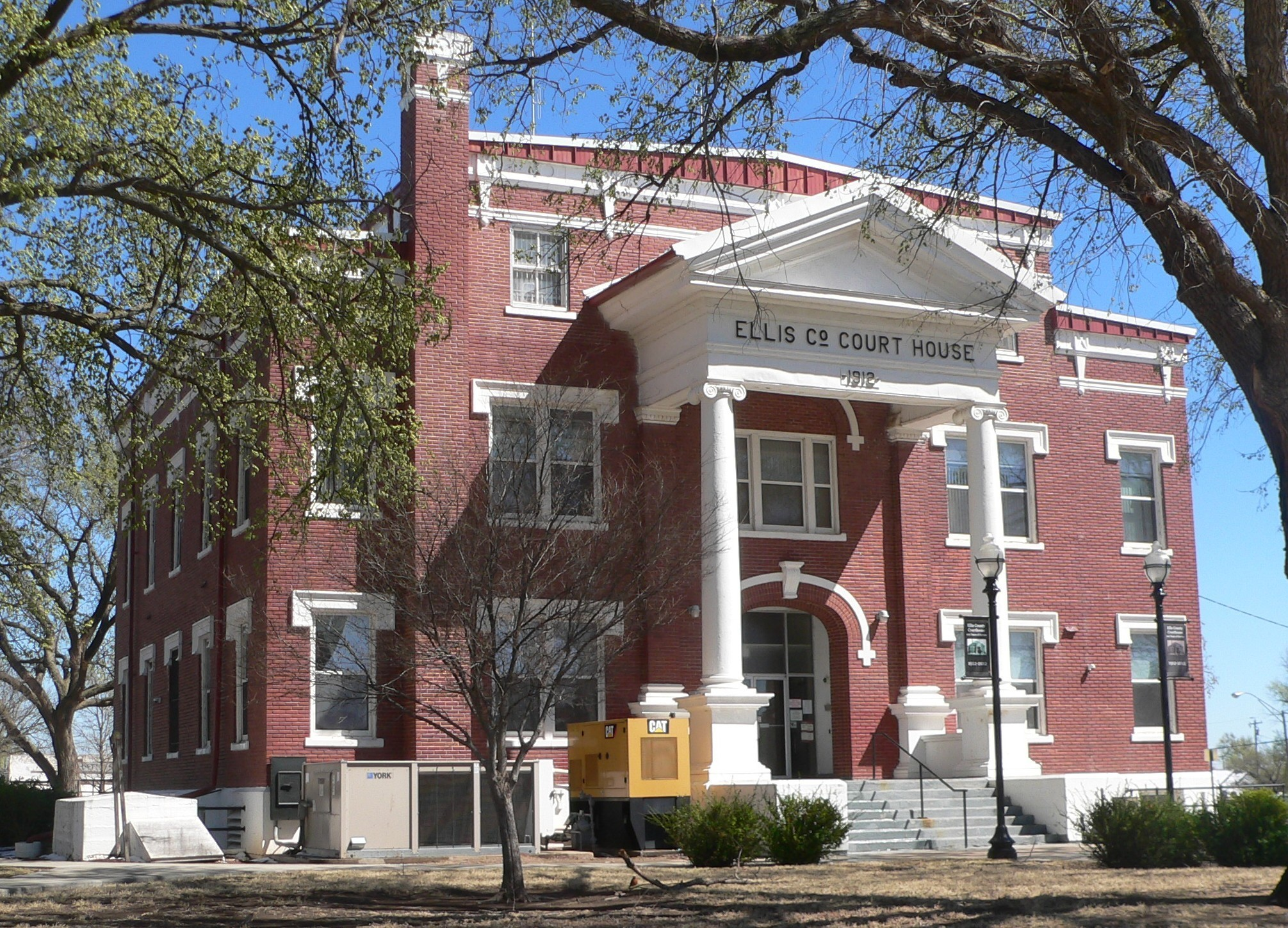

- Location within Oklahoma Location within the United States
- Interactive map showing the location of Ellis County Courthouse
- Location: Town Square, Arnett, Oklahoma
- Coordinates: 36°08′04″N 99°46′14″W
- Area: less than one acre
- Built: 1912
- Architect: P. H. Weathers, et al.
- MPS: County Courthouses of Oklahoma TR
- NRHP reference No.: 85000681
- Added to NRHP: March 22, 1985

The Ellis County Courthouse on the Town Square in Arnett, Oklahoma was built in 1912. It was listed on the National Register of Historic Places in 1985.

It was designed by New York City architect P. H. Weathers.

It is a brick courthouse which was originally two stories with a hipped roof. The roof was removed in the 1930s and a third floor was added to serve as the county jail.

It is important historically since the county seat from the previously-existing Day County, being the town of Grand, together with other parties objected that the newly-designated seat for Ellis County had no suitable building to house the records. This county seat war was only finally resolved with construction of the brick Ellis County Courthouse.
