= AJ Griffin (politician) =

American politician

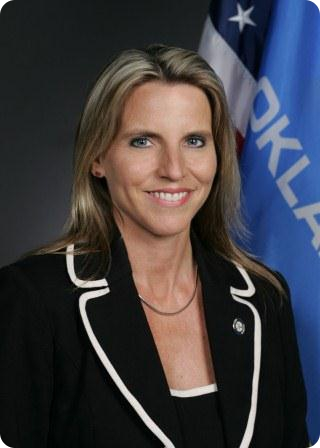

Member of the Oklahoma Senate from the 20th district
- In office February 2012 – July 2018
- Preceded by: David Myers
- Succeeded by: Chuck Hall

Personal details
- Born: Ann Janette Griffin
- Party: Republican

Ann Janette Griffin is an American politician who served as a member of the Oklahoma Senate from the 20th district between 2012 and 2018. She was first elected in 2012 to succeed David Myers after he died of pneumonia late 2011. In March 2018, she announced she would retire from office at the end of her term in 2018.
