= Arnett, Oklahoma =

- Town
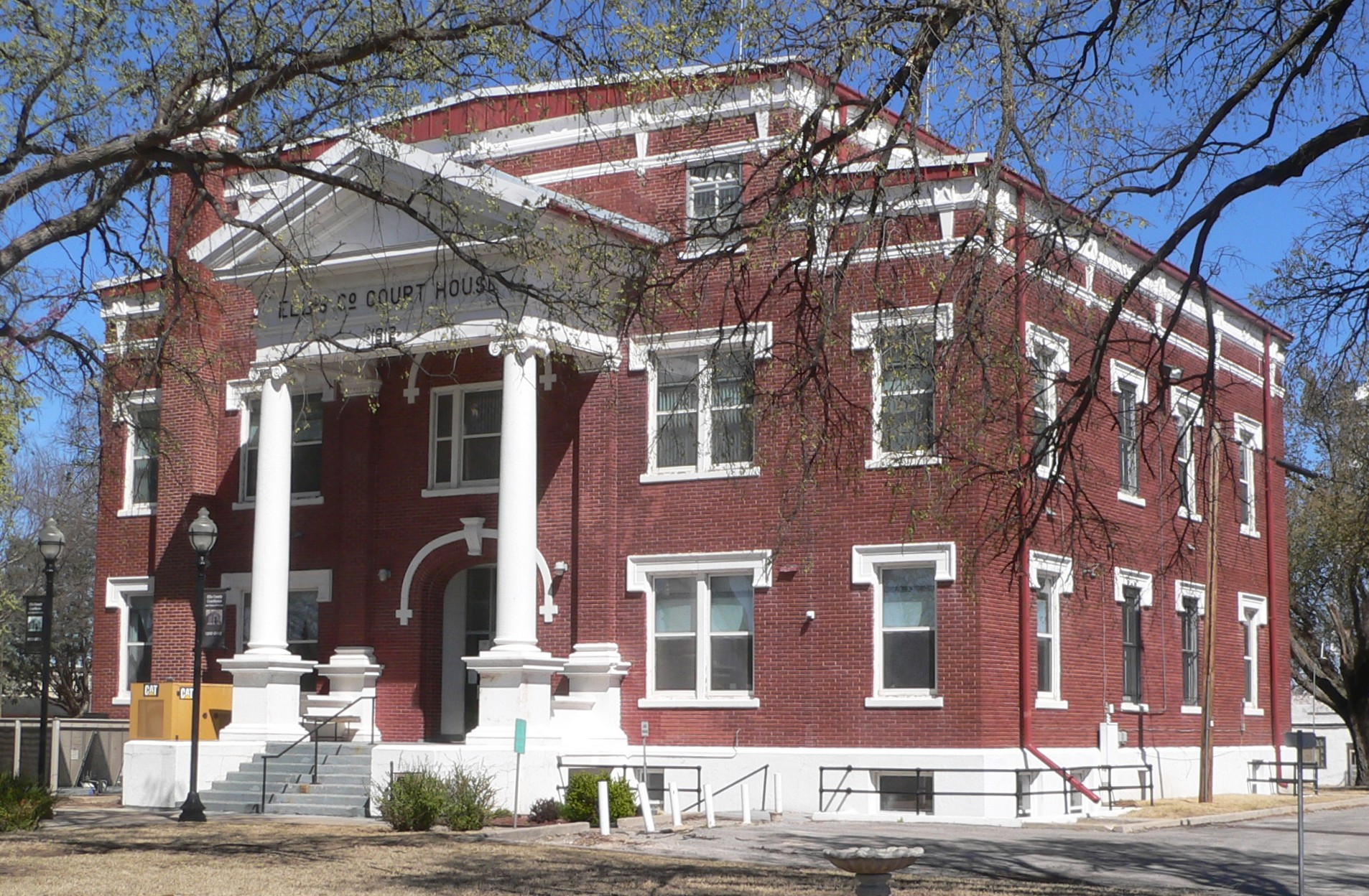
- Ellis County courthouse

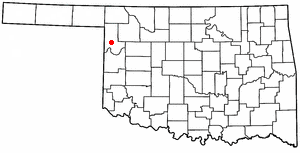
- Location of Arnett within Oklahoma
- Coordinates: 36°08′04″N 99°46′22″W
- Country: United States
- State: Oklahoma
- County: Ellis
- Founded: 1900
- Incorporated: 1909

Area
  - Total: 0.52 sq mi (1.34 km^{2})
  - Land: 0.52 sq mi (1.34 km^{2})
  - Water: 0 sq mi (0.00 km^{2})
- Elevation: 2,451 ft (747 m)

Population (2020)
  - Total: 495
  - Density: 958.9/sq mi (370.23/km^{2})
- Time zone: UTC-6 (Central (CST))
  - Summer (DST): UTC-5 (CDT)
- ZIP code: 73832
- Area code: 580
- FIPS code: 40-02800
- GNIS feature ID: 2411646
- Website: arnettok.com

Arnett is a town in and the county seat of Ellis County, Oklahoma, United States. The population was 495 at the time of the 2020 census.

== History ==
The townsite came about at the junction of local trading routes. A post office was established at the townsite in 1902, with William G. Brown as the postmaster. Brown is said to have named the post office Arnett after A. S. Arnett, Brown's minister from Fayetteville, West Virginia.

After statehood in 1907, several county boundaries changed, and the southern part of old Day County was added to the southwestern part of Woodward County to become Ellis County. An election to locate the county seat was held in June 1908, and resulted in a runoff between Arnett and Shattuck, Oklahoma. Arnett won and remains the county seat today. Shortly thereafter, development continued with the founding of two weekly newspapers the Ellis County Capital and the Arnett Leader as well as lawyer offices, banks, real estate/loan shops, grocery stores, blacksmiths, and more operating there in the pre-World War I years.

== Geography ==
Arnett lies approximately 9 miles (14 km) north-northeast of the Canadian River in the rolling Red Plains region of the Great Plains. Located in northwestern Oklahoma at the junction of U.S. Route 60 and U.S. Route 283, Arnett is 131 mi (211 km) west-northwest of Oklahoma City, 135 mi (217 km) northeast of Amarillo, and 172 mi (277 km) southwest of Wichita.

According to the United States Census Bureau, the town has a total area of 0.4 square miles (1.0 km^{2}), all land.

=== Climate ===
Arnett has a humid subtropical climate (Köppen Cfa) with hot, humid summers and cold, dry winters. The average temperature in Arnett is 57 °F or 13.9 °C, and the average yearly precipitation is 25.4 inches or 645.2 millimetres. On average, January is the coolest month, July is the warmest month, and May is the wettest month. The hottest temperature recorded in Arnett was 110 °F or 43.3 °C in 1951; the coldest temperature recorded was −12 °F or −24.4 °C in 1959.

Climate data for Arnett, Oklahoma, United States
Month	Jan	Feb	Mar	Apr	May	Jun	Jul	Aug	Sep	Oct	Nov	Dec	Year
Record high °F (°C)	85 (29)	88 (31)	93 (34)	98 (37)	102 (39)	110 (43)	109 (43)	110 (43)	105 (41)	99 (37)	88 (31)	87 (31)	110 (43)
Mean daily maximum °F (°C)	45 (7)	51 (11)	59 (15)	69 (21)	77 (25)	86 (30)	91 (33)	90 (32)	82 (28)	71 (22)	57 (14)	47 (8)	69 (21)
Daily mean °F (°C)	33 (1)	37 (3)	46 (8)	57 (14)	66 (19)	75 (24)	80 (27)	79 (26)	70 (21)	59 (15)	46 (8)	35 (2)	57 (14)
Mean daily minimum °F (°C)	20 (−7)	25 (−4)	33 (1)	42 (6)	52 (11)	62 (17)	66 (19)	65 (18)	57 (14)	45 (7)	32 (0)	23 (−5)	44 (6)
Record low °F (°C)	−12 (−24)	−9 (−23)	−6 (−21)	18 (−8)	28 (−2)	43 (6)	52 (11)	49 (9)	30 (−1)	14 (−10)	5 (−15)	−11 (−24)	−12 (−24)
Average precipitation inches (mm)	0.63 (16)	0.95 (24)	1.95 (50)	2.23 (57)	4.54 (115)	3.50 (89)	2.08 (53)	2.41 (61)	2.47 (63)	2.15 (55)	1.44 (37)	1.01 (26)	25.36 (644)
Source: The Weather Channel; Weatherbase

== Demographics ==
Historical population
Census	Pop.	Note	%±
1910	511		—
1920	404		−20.9%
1930	426		5.4%
1940	529		24.2%
1950	690		30.4%
1960	547		−20.7%
1970	711		30.0%
1980	714		0.4%
1990	547		−23.4%
2000	520		−4.9%
2010	524		0.8%
2020	495		−5.5%
U.S. Decennial Census

=== 2020 census ===
As of the 2020 census, Arnett had a population of 495. The median age was 39.3 years. 20.8% of residents were under the age of 18 and 21.8% of residents were 65 years of age or older. For every 100 females there were 93.4 males, and for every 100 females age 18 and over there were 106.3 males age 18 and over.

0.0% of residents lived in urban areas, while 100.0% lived in rural areas.

There were 232 households in Arnett, of which 30.2% had children under the age of 18 living in them. Of all households, 46.1% were married-couple households, 22.8% were households with a male householder and no spouse or partner present, and 25.4% were households with a female householder and no spouse or partner present. About 34.5% of all households were made up of individuals and 16.0% had someone living alone who was 65 years of age or older.

There were 289 housing units, of which 19.7% were vacant. The homeowner vacancy rate was 1.6% and the rental vacancy rate was 9.3%.

Racial composition as of the 2020 census
Race	Number	Percent
White	434	87.7%
Black or African American	4	0.8%
American Indian and Alaska Native	7	1.4%
Asian	3	0.6%
Native Hawaiian and Other Pacific Islander	0	0.0%
Some other race	4	0.8%
Two or more races	43	8.7%
Hispanic or Latino (of any race)	42	8.5%

=== 2010 census ===
As of the census of 2010, there were 524 people living in the town. The population density was 1,300 inhabitants per square mile (500/km^{2}). There were 281 housing units at an average density of 666.4 units per square mile (257.3 units/km^{2}). The racial makeup of the town was 96.35% White, 0.38% African American, 0.96% Native American, 1.15% from other races, and 1.15% from two or more races. Hispanic or Latino of any race were 1.35% of the population.

There were 238 households, out of which 23.1% had children under the age of 18 living with them, 51.3% were married couples living together, 5.9% had a female householder with no husband present, and 40.8% were non-families. 39.1% of all households were made up of individuals, and 19.3% had someone living alone who was 65 years of age or older. The average household size was 2.13 and the average family size was 2.81.

In the town, the population was spread out, with 21.3% under the age of 18, 6.3% from 18 to 24, 23.3% from 25 to 44, 25.8% from 45 to 64, and 23.3% who were 65 years of age or older. The median age was 44 years. For every 100 females, there were 97.0 males. For every 100 females age 18 and over, there were 94.8 males.

The median income for a household in the town was $26,618, and the median income for a family was $29,861. Males had a median income of $24,250 versus $13,438 for females. The per capita income for the town was $14,512. About 12.8% of families and 18.9% of the population were below the poverty line, including 27.4% of those under age 18 and 20.0% of those age 65 or over.

== Education ==
Arnett Independent School District operates one school in the town, Arnett School (Grades Pre-K-12).

== Transportation ==
U.S. Route 60 and SH-51 run concurrently east–west through Arnett. U.S. Route 283, a north–south highway which meets U.S. 60 and SH-51 roughly one-half mile east of town, runs concurrently east–west with U.S. 60 and SH-51 through town. Arnett is also the southern terminus of SH-46 which runs north–south.

== Media ==
Arnett has a weekly newspaper, The Ellis County Capital.

== Historical Sites ==
The Ellis County Courthouse, built in 1912, is in the center of the Courthouse Square in Arnett. The Courthouse is on the National Register of Historic Places listings in Ellis County, Oklahoma.

A log cabin sits just south of the Ellis County Courthouse on the Courthouse lawn, variously known as the Historic Log Cabin of Arnett or the Ellis County Log Cabin. It was built in 1893 of huge cedar logs, some as much as 2-1/2 feet across. It was used as a residence until 1939, and soon thereafter disassembled and put back together in Arnett for preservation.

The remains of Grand, Oklahoma, included on the National Register of Historic Places listings in Ellis County, Oklahoma as Grand Town Site, is 14 miles south of Arnett. This town was voted the seat of old Day County in 1893; however, Day County was eliminated at Oklahoma statehood. The post office closed September 30, 1943, and only building footings remain today.

== Recreation ==
Fort Supply Reservoir and Cooper Wildlife Management Area are to the northwest.

Lake Lloyd Vincent and the Ellis County Wildlife Management Area are to the southwest.

Paddlesack Wildlife Management Area is to the south, while the Black Kettle National Grassland is further south.

== Notable people ==
Notable individuals who were born in and/or have lived in Arnett include:

- Olin Branstetter, Oklahoma state legislator
- Donald J. Gott (1923-1944), U.S. Army 1st Lieutenant, Medal of Honor recipient
