= National Register of Historic Places listings in Custer County, Oklahoma =

Location of Custer County in Oklahoma

This is a list of the National Register of Historic Places listings in Custer County, Oklahoma.

This is intended to be a complete list of the properties and districts on the National Register of Historic Places in Custer County, Oklahoma, United States. The locations of National Register properties and districts for which the latitude and longitude coordinates are included below, may be seen in a map.

There are 14 properties and districts listed on the National Register in the county.

This National Park Service list is complete through NPS recent listings posted March 20, 2026.

== Current listings ==
	Name on the Register	Image	Date listed	Location	City or town	Description
1	Broadway Hotel		March 6, 1985 (#85000489)	Off State Highway 33; 35°39′56″N 98°53′00″W	Custer City	
2	Clinton Armory	Clinton Armory	April 7, 1994 (#94000281)	723 S. 13th St. 35°30′25″N 98°58′31″W	Clinton	
3	Crawford House	Crawford House	March 8, 1984 (#84002998)	600 N. 13th St. 35°31′10″N 98°58′34″W	Clinton	
4	First National Bank of Custer City		October 31, 1985 (#85003426)	Off State Highway 33; 35°39′55″N 98°53′00″W	Custer City	
5	Heerwald Site		March 12, 2012 (#12000112)	Address Restricted	Clinton vicinity	
6	Hodge Site		December 15, 1978 (#78002232)	Address Restricted	Hammon	
7	Little Deer Site		November 27, 1978 (#78002233)	Address Restricted	Weatherford	
8	McLain Rogers Park	McLain Rogers Park	September 3, 2004 (#04000944)	Junction of 10th and Bess Rogers Dr. 35°30′20″N 98°58′25″W	Clinton	
9	Owl Blacksmith Shop		July 27, 1983 (#83002084)	208 W. Rainey; 35°31′29″N 98°42′35″W	Weatherford	No longer extant per Google Street View.
10	J.J. Pyeatt's General Store		March 6, 1985 (#85000488)	Off State Highway 33; 35°39′56″N 98°52′58″W	Custer City	
11	Science Building	Science Building	February 23, 1984 (#84003004)	State St. 35°32′07″N 98°42′22″W	Weatherford	
12	Thomas Community Building		June 8, 2011 (#11000335)	120 E. Broadway; 35°44′38″N 98°44′51″W	Thomas	No longer extant per Google Street View.
13	Weatherford Armory	Weatherford Armory	May 20, 1994 (#94000492)	123 W. Rainey St. 35°31′30″N 98°42′35″W	Weatherford	
14	Y Service Station and Cafe		May 27, 2004 (#04000523)	1733 Neptune Dr. 35°28′57″N 98°58′47″W	Clinton	

== See also ==
- List of National Historic Landmarks in Oklahoma
- National Register of Historic Places listings in Oklahoma
