= Glazier–Higgins–Woodward tornado =

1947 F5 tornado

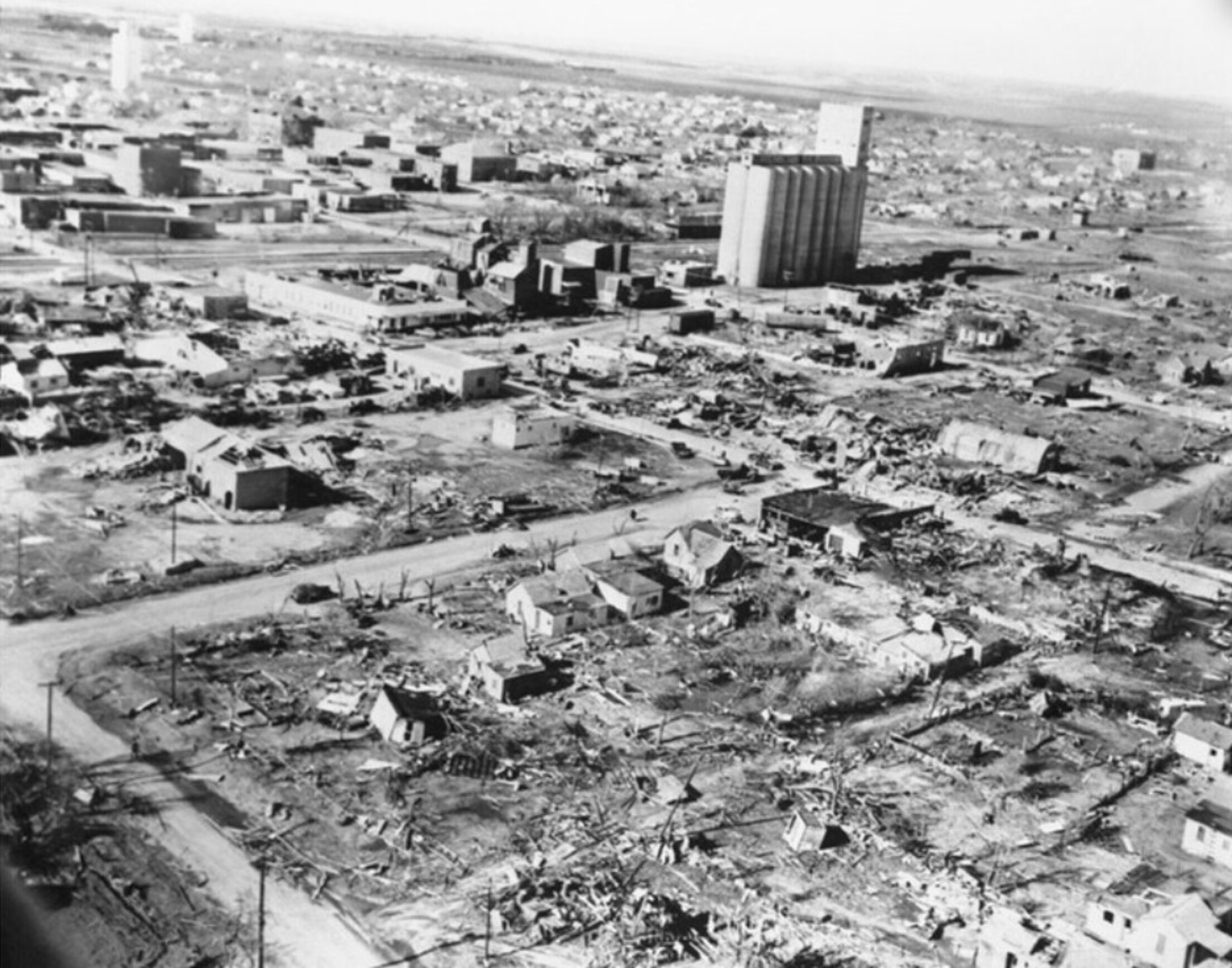
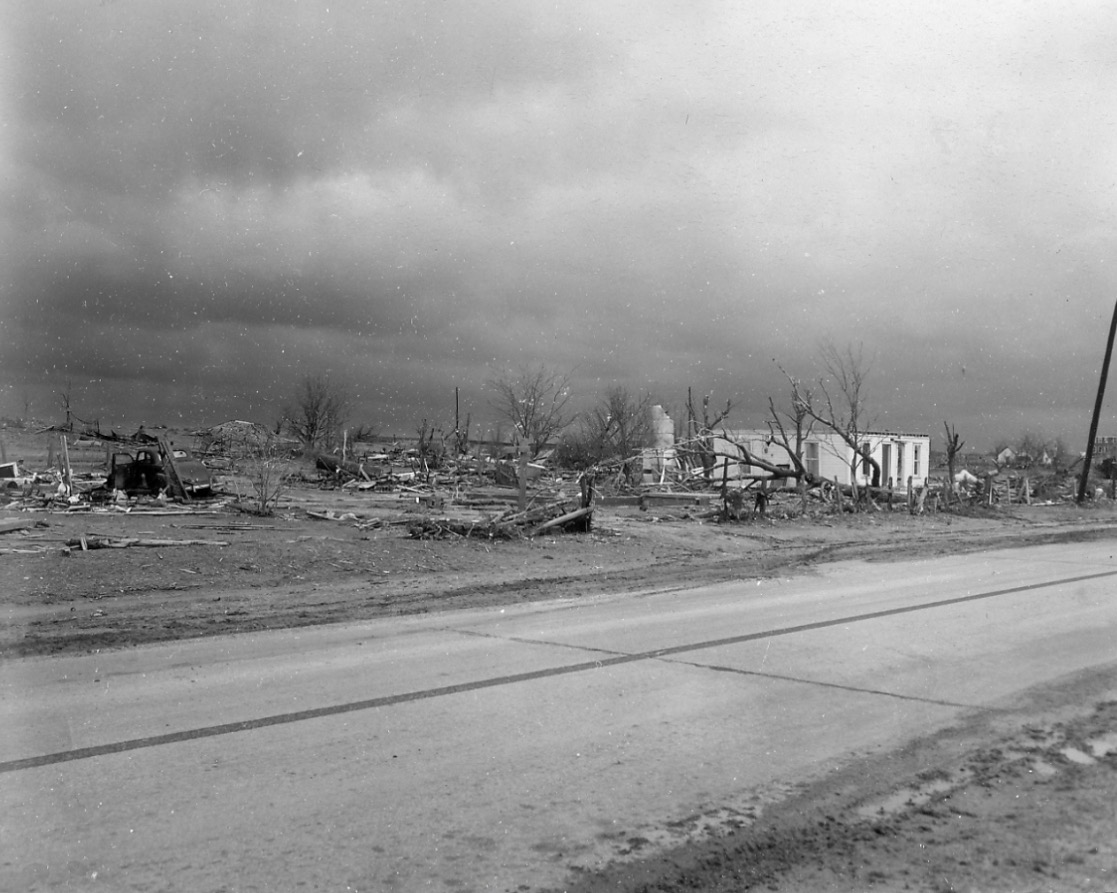
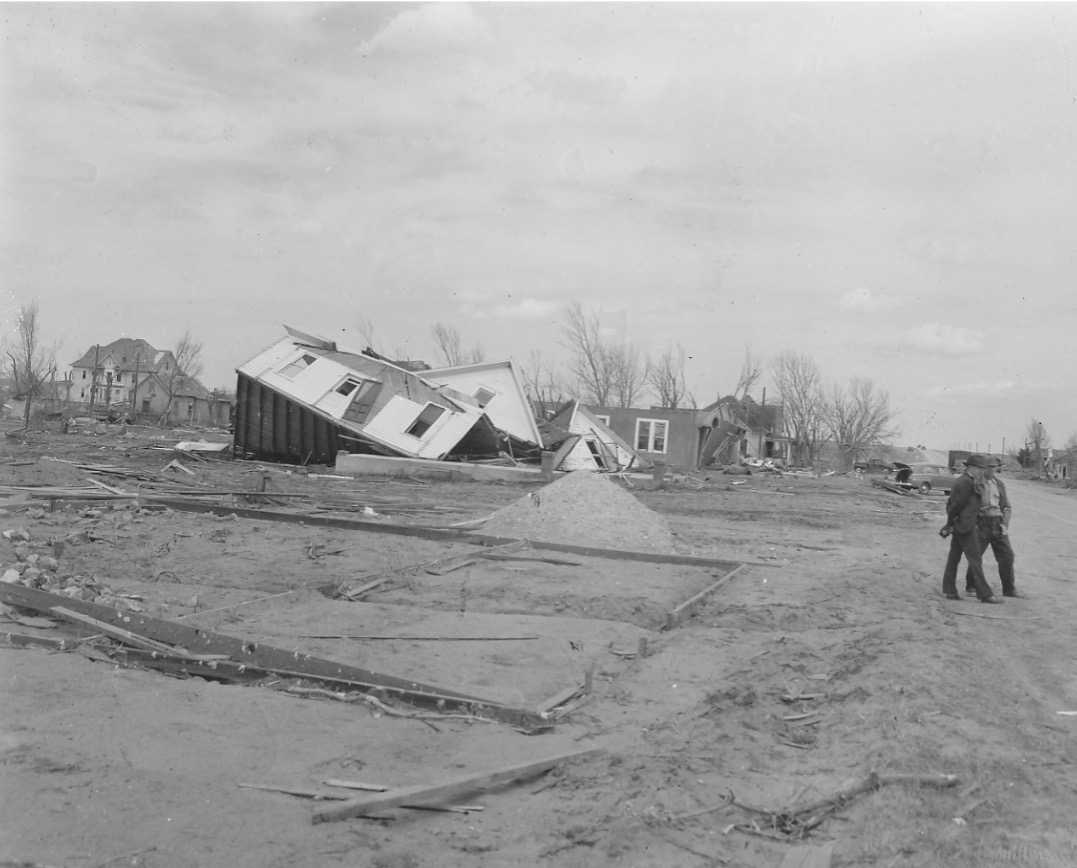
- Clockwise from top: An aerial of Woodward, Oklahoma, following the tornado; A home that was collapsed in Higgins, Texas; Widespread damage seen in the south side of Glazier, Texas.

Meteorological history
- Date: April 9, 1947
- Formed: 7:22 p.m. CDT (UTC−05:00)
- Dissipated: Unknown
- Duration: Unknown

F5 tornado
- on the Fujita scale

Overall effects
- Fatalities: ≥ 185 (6th deadliest tornado in US history and deadliest tornado in Oklahoma history)
- Injuries: 1,000
- Damage: $9,527,750 ($137,380,000 in 2025 USD)
- Part of the Tornado outbreak of April 9–11, 1947 and Tornadoes of 1947

During the late evening hours of April 9, 1947, a large, extremely violent, and destructive F5 tornado hit northwestern Oklahoma and Texas, most notably in the towns of Glazier and Higgins, Texas, as well as Woodward, Oklahoma. It killed 185 and injured over 1,000 people while traveling over 100 miles. 3,000 people were left homeless by the storm. It caused $9,527,750 (1947 USD). Majority of the damage cost occurred in Woodward County, Oklahoma. 17 people were killed at Glazier and 51 at Higgins. In Texas, 69 were killed. In Oklahoma, 116 people were killed. Due to killing 185 people, it became the 6th deadliest tornado in United States history and the deadliest tornado to ever been recorded in the state of Oklahoma.

== Meteorological synopsis ==
=== Synoptics ===
A map at 250 mb (hPa) highlighted a strong and positively tilted jet streak. The 500 mb level possessed the same jet. Cooling temperature along with height falls at the 500 mb level deepened lapse rates. All of these factors helped deepened low-level wind shear. Severe weather potential during the morning was unlikely, since low-level moisture helped produce fog.

At 6:00 AM CDT, a surface low was present in northeastern New Mexico, with a cold front to the southwest. The warm sector had plentiful amounts of moisture, which helped fuel storms. At the Texas panhandle, temperatures and dew points were all around 50 °F (10 °C). By 5:00 PM CDT, the low had moved east. The cold front had bulged southward. The warm front had moved northward throughout the day, while southerly flow increased in the warm sector.

Synoptic reanalysis near Glazier had show steep lapse rates of up to 7.2 K/km. Speed shear and directional shear measurements were up to 57 knots (29 m/s). Low-level helicity values were up to 135 m^{2}/s^{2}. When the warm front moved further north, sufficient heating occurred. Some areas reached over 65 °F (18 °C). The long wave trough made the lapse rates even stronger. Lapse rates reached 8.2 K/km. CAPE reached 1,100 J/kg. 0-3 km CAPE reached 61 J/kg. All of these factors led to the formation of severe storms.

== Tornado summary ==
=== Texas ===
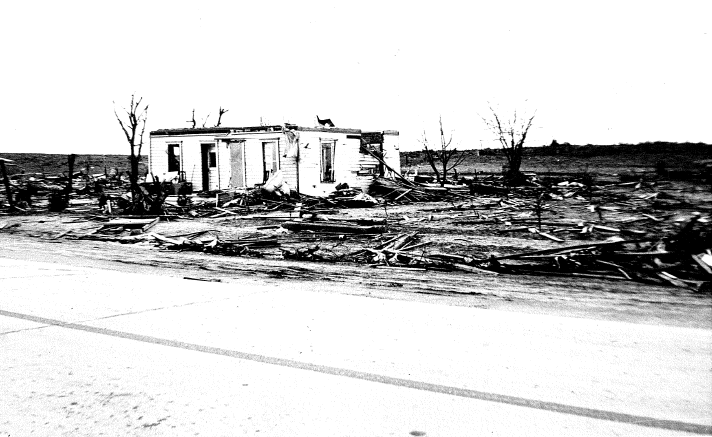
The only home left standing in Glazier.

The tornado was first spotted with four other tornadoes alongside it. At this time, the tornado was said to be 1 mile (1.6 kilometers) in width. The tornado threw a car into a bar ditch. Later, the tornado destroyed an outhouse along with a garage. A windmill was knocked over by the tornado. (Note: The tornado being explained before the note could possibly a separate tornado than the tornado that hit Glazier and Higgins, Texas.) The tornado passed three miles (4.8 kilometers) northwest of Canadian, Texas. At about 7:22 P.M. CDT, the tornado struck the small town of Glazier, leaving only one home standing. At Glazier, the tornado reached a width of 600 yards (548 meters). Residents of Glazier only knew of the tornado once spotting it. A chain hoist was thrown into a chicken house, killing numerous chickens. A man and a woman both survived the tornado by sheltering in the local jail. One man was thrown from his home to a nearby location, surviving being thrown. Two other people were thrown over 300 yards (274 meters), one of them being unscathed. Pieces of a car were thrown over 1.5 miles (2.4 kilometers) north of Glazier. Between Glazier and Higgins the tornado traveled along a highway between the two towns. Fence posts were sanded down to stubs. Heading northeastward, at 7:40 P.M. CDT, the tornado impacted the south side of Higgins, Texas. It expanded to over 1.5 miles (2.4 kilometers). Within Higgins multiple buildings were damaged. The business section of town was destroyed. A business sustained severe damage, having one exterior wall collapse. One two story home completely collapsed. A blank check from Higgins was carried by the storm, landing in a pasture, 6 miles (9.7 kilometers) east of Wilmore, Kansas. Homes in the town were lifted and thrown. Eyewitnesses of the tornado in Higgins claimed it sounded like a "freight train" and said it looked like "two tornadoes”.

=== Oklahoma ===
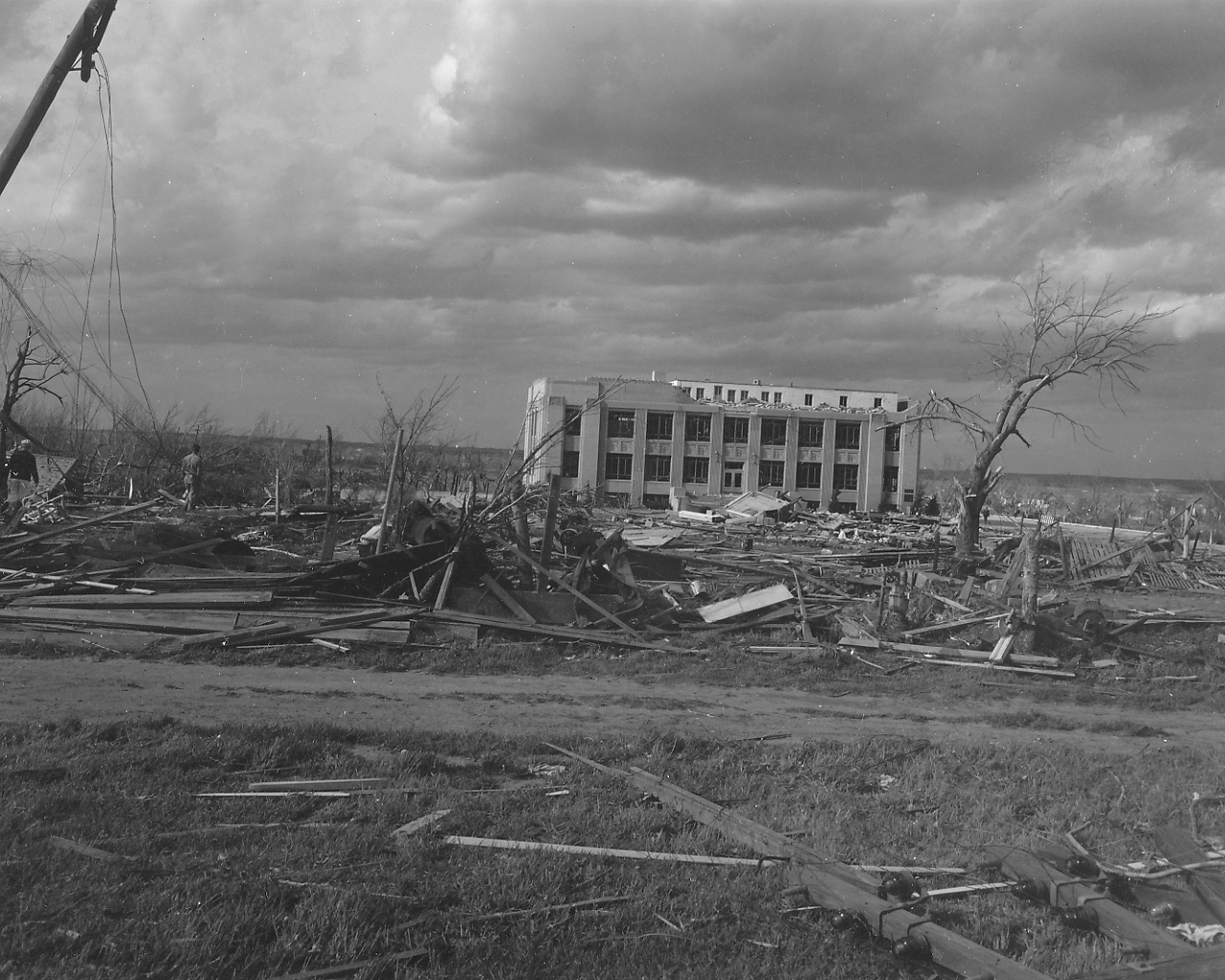
A view of the damaged Woodward County Courthouse building in Woodward.

At around 8:00 P.M. CDT, the tornado entered Ellis County, Oklahoma, later it traveled southeast of Gage. Although remaining rural in Ellis County, 60 farms were destroyed, and 8 people were killed. 42 were injured in Ellis County. Telephone operators in Woodward received warning of the tornado from two other operators in Shattuck and Cestos. Racing northeastward, the tornado moved into Woodward County, where it killed one person near Tangier. The tornado crossed over a lake, causing the water level to fall by 1 foot (0.3 meters). After leaving the lake, at 8:42 P.M. CDT, it struck Woodward. One man in a power plant in Woodward cut the power to the city, before being killed. In Woodward, the high winds destroyed multiple structures. The Woodward County Courthouse had pieces of its stone facing ripped out. A battery shop in town was demolished. A grocery store was also demolished, and nearby debris was scattered on power lines. One theater was impacted, where the tornado killed one man who had left the theater when the tornado struck. At the theater, the roof gave away, crushing people inside. Some people within the theater were able to escape the debris due to a door being blown open by debris. A tractor had its radiator “chewed away” and debris had been thrown into it. Houses had siding stripped away along with windows being broken. While in Woodward, it started destroying over 100 city blocks, and killing 107 in town. The tornado hit the North Canadian River. A bridge along the river had its road stripped away. After leaving Woodward, it went into Woods County, where it started weakening, but still managing to destroy 36 homes and injuring 30 near White Horse, before eventually dissipating near Alva.

== Aftermath ==
=== Casualties ===
The tornado killed 185 people and injured over 1,000 people. Killing 17 people in Glazier, Texas and an additional 51 people in Higgins, Texas, it became the fourth deadliest tornado in Texas history. In Oklahoma, a total of 116 people were killed. Due to killing 116 people within Oklahoma, it holds the record of being the deadliest tornado in Oklahoma history. Overall, it is the sixth deadliest tornado in United States history.

=== Damage ===
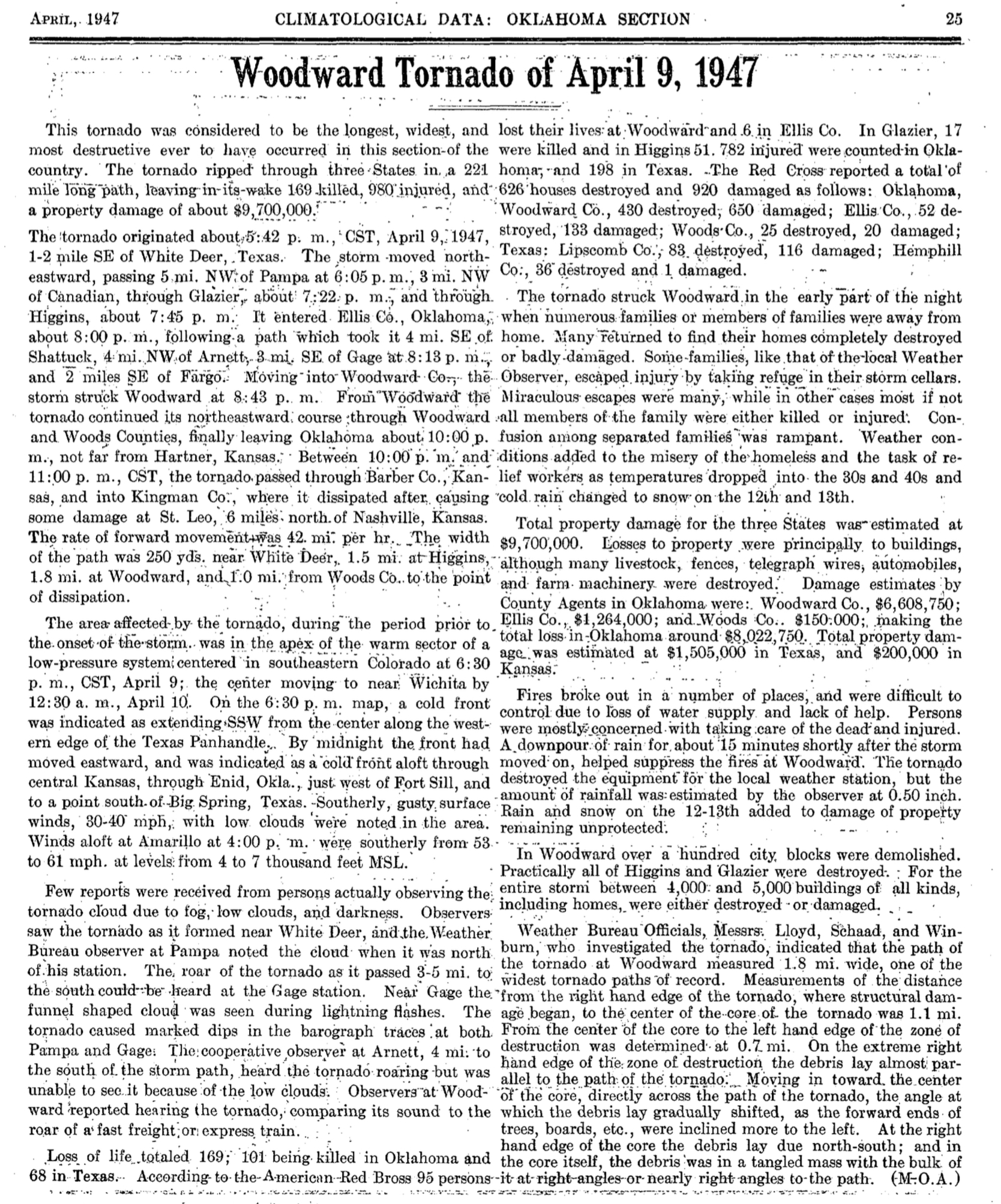
A detailed US Weather Bureau summary for the 1947 Woodward tornado.

Over 200 blocks of Woodward were destroyed. After the tornado hit Woodward, a lightning strike caused a fire at multiple buildings. Destroyed vehicles were found in fields and next to the remains of buildings. One car was found caught in a grove of trees. Some homes remained virtually untouched next to damaged structures. In a lumber yard, the structures roof and walls had been torn away, but timber remained stacked. At Woodward, the power was gone, only one telephone pole remained upright. Only one house in Glazier, Texas remained standing. At Higgins, Texas, a half ton lathe was ripped from its anchoring and broke into two pieces. Debris covered the roads in Higgins, where a fire occurred in the business district, destroying a grocery store and several other buildings. A news reporter claimed Glazier and Higgins looked like an atomic bomb had been dropped on the towns. Back at Woodward, a cafe was destroyed, but three seats remained standing. One car in Woodward had been crushed. After being crushed, the car remained no taller than two feet. A combine remained upright while nearby structures were razed. Damage costs in Texas totaled $1,505,000 (1947 USD), while damage in Oklahoma was $8,022,750 (1947 USD). In all, the tornado caused $9,527,750 (1947 USD) in damages.

=== Response ===
==== Woodward ====
The dead could not be moved until midnight, first responders had to focus on the injured. The Woodward Hospital quickly filled to capacity. A Baptist church was also used to house the injured. The 62 room Baker hotel relocated every guest, to make room for the injured. At the Mooreland Community Hospital, it was also at capacity within a few hours. Medical professionals came to assist with the injured from Oklahoma City and Wichita. The Red Cross and Salvation Army came to volunteer. Injured people were sent to Oklahoma City and a train car of injured people arrived in Alva. Blood and Plasma were transported to Woodward via airplane, along with mobile X-ray machines.

A Trans World Airlines flight picked up a radio message, the message claimed that thousands were injured in Woodward. Up to 275 volunteers came to Woodward in the days after the tornado. Emergency generators came in from the Oklahoma City Fire Department and the Oklahoma Gas & Electric. Sixty law enforcement from surrounding communities came in to help reinstall order. Water was brought from Mooreland and Seiling. 3,000 cots were set up in many churches. 3,000 tents were being shipped from Fort Worth, Texas. Coffee, sandwiches, and clothing were all distributed by the Red Cross. Damage to roads costed at least $25,000 (1947 USD).

===== Looting in Woodward =====
Public safety commissioner, Paul Reed, announced that multiple areas in Woodward were closed off from the public due to multiple cases of looting. The 45th Signal Company of the National Guard were armed, doing sentry duty. People moving in and out of the razed areas needed passes from the Highway Patrol Office.

==== Texas ====
A 21 van convoy came from Fort Worth to help with the storm damaged towns. A fleet of airplanes came from Fort Sill carrying 500 blankets and 25 beds. The injured were sent to multiple hospitals around the Texas panhandle. $100,000 (1947 USD) were used for a fund to help victims of the tornado. Former Texas Governor Beauford H. Jester sent out 30 highway patrol vehicles to the storm damaged areas. The governor was asked to bring the Texas State Guard to the Texas panhandle. On April 11, relief had to be paused due to 4 inches of snow falling on the Texas panhandle. People in and around Glazier were asked to help with the aftermath. People were asked to bring tractors and tools to help. Free lunches were handed out by the Red Cross. Fifteen temporary housing requests were made. Multiple residents of Glazier claimed they will help rebuild, though most claimed they will leave and not return. A Methodist church was used as an emergency hospital for those in Glazier. Aid for Higgins came from all over Texas. Aid also came from New York. Doctors and ambulances came to Higgins. 140 pounds (63.5 kilograms) of frozen animal meat was brought. Morticians from neighboring towns assisted with dealing with the dead. An air field in Pampa, Texas was used for housing for refugees. The Red Cross were supposed to help with utilities in the air field.

=== Sante Fe railroad train wreck ===
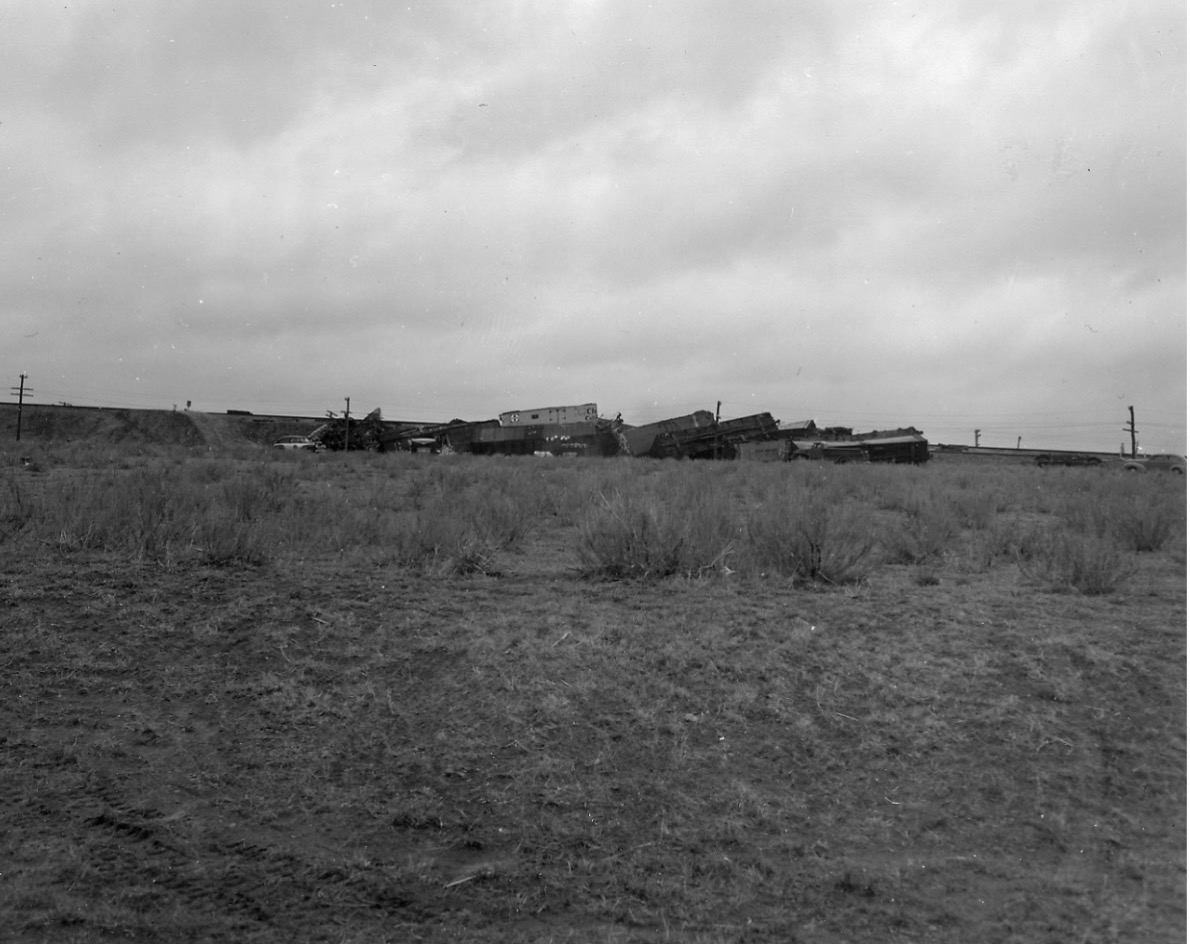
The train collision seen a few days later.

On April 12, 1947, at 11:20 P.M. CST, along the Atchison, Topeka and Santa Fe Railway, two trains suffered a rear-end collision near Higgins, Texas, killing three men and injuring one. All prior train signals were destroyed by the tornado and the Centralized traffic control (CTC) system was left inoperable. The first train had stopped west of Higgins, to check for hot boxes. The brakemen of the train attempted to place warning signals near the rear of the train, when a second train (No. 5001) collided with the first train (No. 2927) at roughly 28 mph. Snowfall further reduced visibility. Reports of the wreck were spread through shortwave radio. At least 30 cars in the wreck were derailed, six of them being food refrigerators.

List of known fatalities from the collision
Occupation	Name	Age	Refs.
Engineer	A. Sophrere	45	
Fireman	T. L. Murphy	30	
Brakeman	W. L. Bagwell	41	

== See also ==
- List of F5, EF5, and IF5 tornadoes
- Tornado outbreak of April 9–11, 1947 - The outbreak that formed the tornado.
- Tornadoes of 1947
- 1905 Snyder tornado - The second deadliest tornado in Oklahoma history, behind the Woodward tornado.
- 1999 Bridge Creek–Moore tornado - An extremely deadly and costly F5 tornado in Oklahoma 52 years later in 1999.
