= Broadway Hotel =

Broadway Hotel may refer to:

in Australia

- Broadway Hotel, Woolloongabba in Brisbane, Queensland

in the United States

- Valentine on Broadway Hotel, in Kansas City, Missouri, listed on the National Register of Historic Places in Missouri
- Broadway Hotel (Custer, Oklahoma)
- Broadway Hotel (Portland, Oregon)
- Broadway Hotel (Salt Lake City, Utah), listed on the National Register of Historic Places in Utah

in music

- "Broadway Hotel", a song by Al Stewart from his 1976 album Year of the Cat
