= Tornado outbreak of April 9–11, 1947 =

1947 windstorm through the U.S. states of Texas, Oklahoma, and Kansas

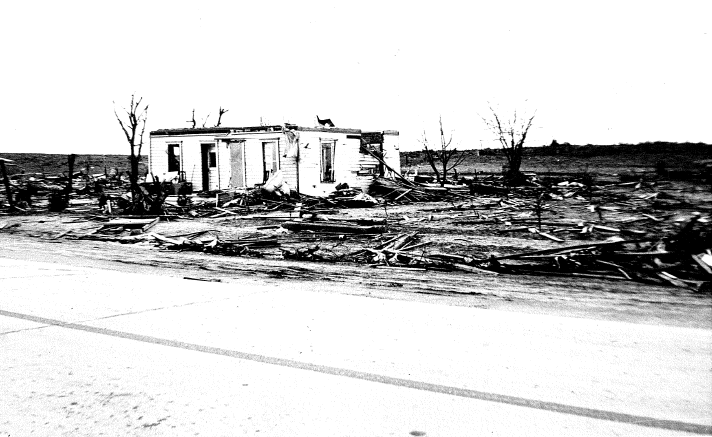
- Home left standing at Glazier, Texas, after the F5 tornado on April 9

Tornado outbreak
- Tornadoes: ≥ 12–17
- Max. rating: F5 tornado
- Duration: April 9–11, 1947

Overall effects
- Fatalities: ≥ 185
- Injuries: ≥ 990
- Damage: $10,027,750 ($144,590,000 in 2025 USD)
- Areas affected: Primarily the southern Great Plains
- Part of the tornadoes and tornado outbreaks of 1947

From April 9–11, 1947, a significant tornado outbreak produced catastrophic effects over portions of the southern Great Plains, in the contiguous United States. The outbreak generated at least 12, and possibly 17 or more, tornadoes, many of which were significant. On Wednesday, April 9, a series of related tornadoes spawned by a single supercell, dubbed the Glazier–Higgins–Woodward tornadoes, swept through the U.S. states of Texas, Oklahoma, and Kansas. Most of the damage and nearly all of the deaths are still blamed on one large tornado, known as the Glazier–Higgins–Woodward tornado, that traveled 98 mi (158 km) from Texas to Oklahoma, beginning over the South Plains. This event, up to nearly 2 mi (3.2 km) in width, was often compared to the Tri-State tornado, because it was originally thought to have left a 198-to-221-mile-long (319 to 356 km) path, was similarly large and intense for much of its path, and was also retroactively rated F5 on the modern-day Fujita scale, but it is now believed to have been part of a 125-to-170-mile-long (201 to 274 km) family of nine or 10 tornadoes. (Note: An outbreak is generally defined as a group of at least six tornadoes (the number sometimes varies slightly according to local climatology) with no more than a six-hour gap between individual tornadoes. An outbreak sequence, prior to (after) the start of modern records in 1950, is defined as a period of no more than two (one) consecutive days without at least one significant (F2 or stronger) tornado.)

== Background ==
Early on April 9, the United States Weather Bureau in Amarillo, Texas, forecast late-afternoon temperatures of about 60 °F (16 °C) over the Texas panhandle. At the time, dense, low-lying stratus and a layer of fog were present, with temperatures ranging from the upper 40s to low 50s °F. However, an approaching warm front—then extended from Sherman, Texas, to Raton, New Mexico—would later combine with a robust trough aloft to enhance conditions for severe weather. In tandem with this, a low-pressure area over northeastern New Mexico, along with an attendant dry line, would gradually eject, leading to stronger low-level wind shear and more pronounced lapse rates. Around 2:00 p.m. CST (18:00 UTC), helicity was near 135 m^{2}/s^{2}, but would decline afterward. As it did so, however, an unexpected decrease in cloud cover allowed for greater-than-expected diurnal heating, leading to a substantial rise in atmospheric instability and associated buoyancy. By 6:30 p.m. CST (00:30 UTC), the low-pressure center was situated over southern Colorado, and a 53-to-61-mile-per-hour (85 to 98 km/h) jet stream existed 4,000 to 7,000 ft (1,200 to 2,100 m; 1.2 to 2.1 km) above sea level. Surface-based temperatures quickly reached the upper 60s °F. In the mixed layer, the convective available potential energy (CAPE) rose above 1,100 j/kg, and the lifted condensation level (LCL) was just 752 m (0.752 km) above ground level, along with a level of free convection (LFC) of 1,410 m (1.41 km). Mixed-layer convective inhibition by then had decreased, offsetting the loss of helicity, and the presence of the warm front acted in concert with the aforementioned factors to favor supercells capable of generating strong tornadoes. Gusts of 30 to 40 mph (48 to 64 km/h) attended the passage of a cold front overnight.

== Confirmed tornadoes ==
Confirmed tornadoes by Fujita rating
FU	F0	F1	F2	F3	F4	F5	Total
≥2–7	?	?	8	?	1	1	≥12–17*

- A possible tornado may have flattened a barn just south of Carpenter, Oklahoma, on April 9.

Prior to 1990, there is a likely undercount of tornadoes, particularly E/F0–1, with reports of weaker tornadoes becoming more common as population increased. A sharp increase in the annual average E/F0–1 count by approximately 200 tornadoes was noted upon the implementation of NEXRAD Doppler weather radar in 1990–1991. (Note: Historically, the number of tornadoes globally and in the United States was and is likely underrepresented: research by Grazulis on annual tornado activity suggests that, as of 2001, only 53% of yearly U.S. tornadoes were officially recorded. Documentation of tornadoes outside the United States was historically less exhaustive, owing to the lack of monitors in many nations and, in some cases, to internal political controls on public information. Most countries only recorded tornadoes that produced severe damage or loss of life. Significant low biases in U.S. tornado counts likely occurred through the early 1990s, when advanced NEXRAD was first installed and the National Weather Service began comprehensively verifying tornado occurrences.) 1974 marked the first year where significant tornado (E/F2+) counts became homogenous with contemporary values, attributed to the consistent implementation of Fujita scale assessments. (Note: The Fujita scale was devised under the aegis of scientist T. Theodore Fujita in the early 1970s. Prior to the advent of the scale in 1971, tornadoes in the United States were officially unrated. Tornado ratings were retroactively applied to events prior to the formal adoption of the F-scale by the National Weather Service. While the Fujita scale has been superseded by the Enhanced Fujita scale in the U.S. since February 1, 2007, Canada used the old scale until April 1, 2013; nations elsewhere, like the United Kingdom, apply other classifications such as the TORRO scale.) Numerous discrepancies on the details of tornadoes in this outbreak exist between sources. The total count of tornadoes and ratings differs from various agencies accordingly. The list below documents information from the most contemporary official sources alongside assessments from tornado historian Thomas P. Grazulis.

List of confirmed tornadoes in the tornado outbreak of April 9–11, 1947
F#	Location	County / Parish	State	Date (Note: All dates are based on the local time zone where the tornado touched down; however, all times are in Coordinated Universal Time and dates are split at midnight CST/CDT for consistency.)	Time (UTC)	Path length	Width (Note: The listed width values are primarily the average/mean width of the tornadoes, with those having known maximum widths denoted by ♯. From 1952 to 1994, reports largely list mean width whereas contemporary years list maximum width. Values provided by Grazulis are the average width, with estimates being rounded down (i.e. 0.5 mi (0.80 km) is rounded down from 880 yards to 800 yards.)	Damage (Note: All losses are in 1947 USD unless otherwise noted.)
F2	WSW of White Deer to E of Skellytown	Carson	Texas	April 9	23:42–?	12 mi (19 km)	250 yd (230 m)♯	Unknown
F2	This tornado, the first member of the Glazier–Higgins–Woodward family, struck a train, derailing 19 of 61 cars, along with three cabooses. A pair of men were injured aboard. The tornado also damaged several homes, including a farmhouse that was lifted into the air and set back down on its foundation, partly collapsing as a result, resulting in a third injury. Outbuildings and a garage were wrecked as well, and part of a barn was blown away.							
FU	NW of Pampa	Gray, Roberts	Texas	April 9	00:05–?	Unknown	Unknown	Unknown
FU	After the White Deer tornado dissipated, a second tornado touched down, remaining over open fields and causing no damage before dissipating.							
FU	SW to NW of Miami (five tornadoes)	Roberts	Texas	April 9	Unknown	Unknown	1,760 yd (1,610 m)♯	Unknown
FU	1 death – This large multiple-vortex event bypassed several farms in the area, reportedly debarking trees in open country. A railway signal station was blown away and a railcar knocked off its track. Several tornadoes were observed, one of which was up to 1 mi (1.6 km) wide. At least one of the tornadoes may have been the same as the Glazier–Higgins–Woodward F5.							
F5	NW of Canadian (TX) to W of Alva (OK)	Hemphill (TX), Lipscomb (TX), Ellis (OK), Woodward (OK), Woods (OK)	Texas, Oklahoma	April 9	Unknown	≥98 mi (158 km)	3,520 yd (3,220 m)♯	$9,527,750
F5	184+ deaths – See article on this tornado – At least 980 people were injured.							
F2	Grimes	Roger Mills	Oklahoma	April 9	02:00–?	Unknown	Unknown	Unknown
F2	This tornado destroyed a barn and a home, injuring a few people. A store and a school lost their roofs as well.							
F4	N of Meade to ESE of Dodge City	Meade, Ford	Kansas	April 9	02:15–?	35 mi (56 km)	400 yd (370 m)	$225,000
F4	This was likely a family of intense tornadoes and downbursts, as its swath of damage often shifted dramatically. Numerous farms were flattened each at several locations, at least a few being obliterated. Barns were wrecked on 12 farmsteads in Ford County, and homes on the outskirts of Fowler were damaged as well. Three people were injured.							
F2	W of Hardtner to St. Leo	Barber, Kingman	Kansas	April 9	04:00–?	Unknown	Unknown	$200,000
F2	Following the dissipation of the Woodward F5, the tornado family it belonged to pressed on to Kansas, its parent supercell generating four or more tornadoes intermittently along the way before dissipating near Topeka. Most of these tornadoes were F1 or F2 in intensity, and the majority of the damage was likely attributable to downbursts, affecting rural areas in or near Gerlane, Pixley, Hazelton, Sharon, Zenda, and Nashville. Debris from Arnett, Oklahoma, was found 15 mi (24 km) to westward.							
F2	Near Quinlan	Woodward	Oklahoma	April 10	05:00–?	Unknown	Unknown	Unknown
F2	Many barns were wrecked.							
F2	NE of Walton to near Elmdale	Harvey, Marion, Chase	Kansas	April 10	07:00–?	25 mi (40 km)	100 yd (91 m)	$50,000
F2	A few homes were unroofed and about 12 barns were wrecked.							
F2	N of Peabody to near Burdick	Marion, Morris	Kansas	April 10	07:30–?	28 mi (45 km)	Unknown	Unknown
F2	20 farmsteads were impacted and a few barns destroyed, along with various outbuildings and equipment. Two people were injured.							
F2	SW of Harveyville to E of Auburn	Wabaunsee, Osage, Shawnee	Kansas	April 10	08:30–?	15 mi (24 km)	200 yd (180 m)	$25,000
F2	Homes lost their roofs, cattle were killed, and barns were flattened.							
F2	Near Hampshire	Maury	Tennessee	April 11	09:00–?	2 mi (3.2 km)	Unknown	Unknown
F2	Four barns were destroyed.							

=== Glazier–Higgins, Texas/Woodward, Oklahoma ===
Glazier–Higgins, Texas/Woodward, Oklahoma
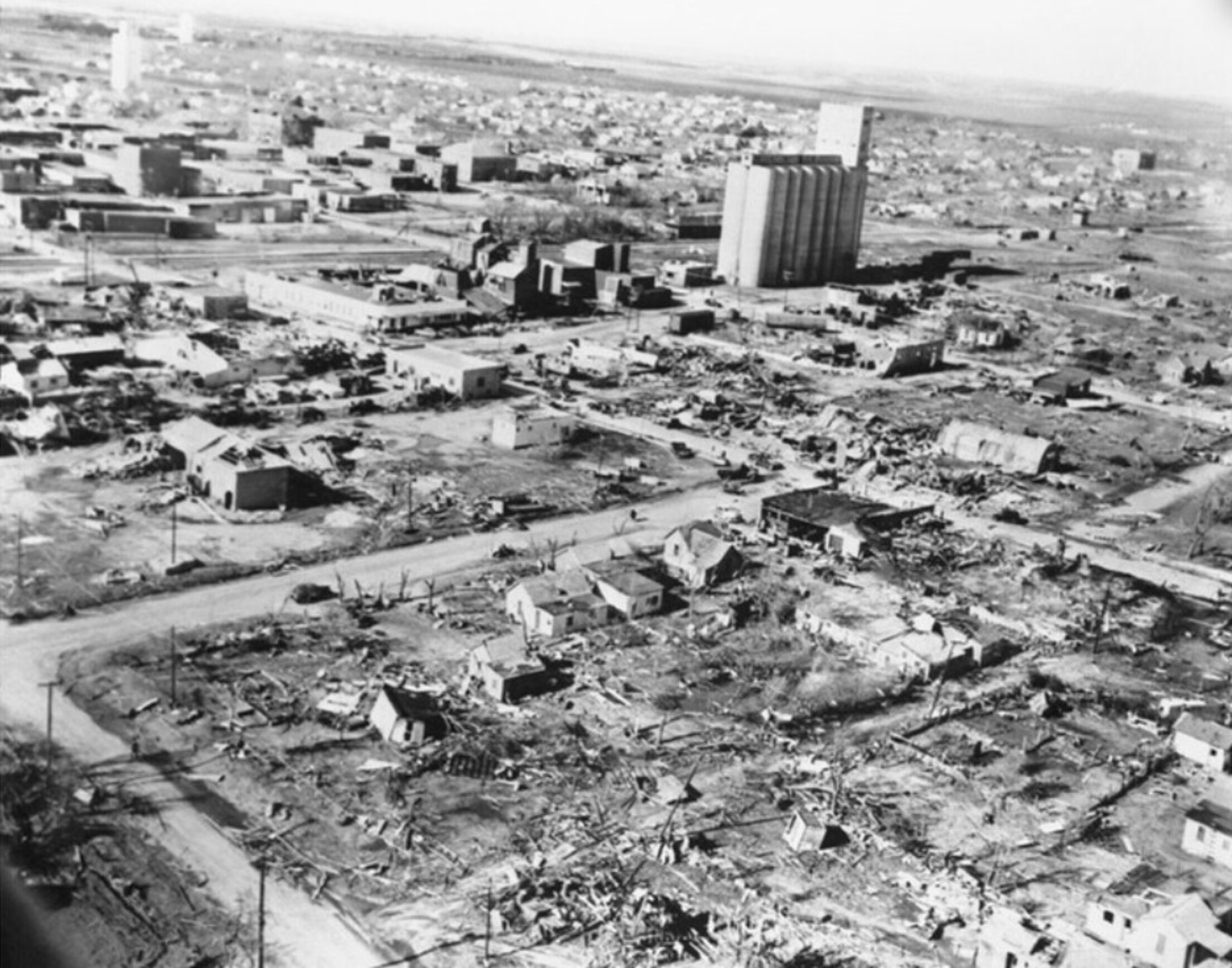
- An aerial of Woodward, Oklahoma after the tornado

F5 tornado
- on the Fujita scale

Overall effects
- Fatalities: ≥ 184
- Injuries: ≥ 980
- Damage: $9,527,750 ($137,380,000 in 2025 USD)

Moving at an average of 42 to 50 mph (68 to 80 km/h), this extremely large and violent tornado was first confirmed near Canadian, Texas. When it struck the tiny town of Glazier, it may have been as much as two miles (3.2 km) wide. Most structures in town were swept completely away and scattered. Vehicles in the area were thrown hundreds of yards and mangled, shrubbery was debarked, and ground scouring occurred. Glazier was considered completely destroyed, with 17 dead, a major percentage of the populace. Press reports told of two people who were known to be together in Glazier before the tornado struck were found three miles (4.8 km) apart afterward. The tornado maintained its intensity as it slammed into Higgins, on the Texas–Oklahoma border, which was also devastated. The accepted death toll here was 51; again, a major fraction of the residents of the town were killed or injured. Much of downtown Higgins was completely demolished, and entire rows of homes were swept away. At one residence, a 4 1/2-tonne (4,500 kg) lathe was reportedly ripped from its anchors and broken in half.

After killing at least one other person, the tornado crossed the state line and entered Oklahoma. There the tornado was at its worst—the deadliest storm in that state's tornado-troubled history. Six more people were killed when the tornado swept away about 60 ranches and farms south of Shattuck, Gage, and Fargo. During its trek, the funnel was so wide and low to the ground that it did not resemble a prototypical tornado. The tornado then moved into Woodward, where it devastated the town and killed an estimated 107 people. The damage that occurred in Woodward was catastrophic. There, the tornado was 1.8 mi (2.9 km) wide and destroyed 100 city blocks. Many homes and businesses were leveled or swept away, and as the tornado struck the town's power plant, a 20-tonne (20,000 kg) steel boiler tank was lofted and thrown a block and a half. Large trees sustained severe debarking as well. The tornado finally dissipated in Woods County, west of Alva, where it wrecked 36 homes and injured 30 people.

Cleanup in the region was made more difficult because of cold and snow that followed the tornado. Four-year-old Joan Gay Croft and her sister Jerri were among refugees taking shelter in a basement hallway of the Woodward hospital. As officials sent the injured to different hospitals in the area, two men took Joan away, saying they were taking her to Oklahoma City. She was never seen again. Over the years, several women have come forth saying they suspect they might be Joan, although none of the claims have been verified. She is likely deceased. The Glazier–Higgins–Woodward tornado was the sixth deadliest in U.S. history, killing 184 and injuring 980; of these figures, 116 deaths and 782 injuries occurred in Oklahoma. An undetermined number of additional fatalities may have occurred in both states affected. In all, the tornado destroyed 626 homes and damaged 920 others, becoming the costliest on record in Oklahoma history.

== Aftermath and recovery ==
A US Weather Bureau report on the F5 tornado that struck Woodward gives the following figures on the damage caused in its "Original Summary" section.

- Lipscomb County, Texas – 36 homes flattened, 1 damaged
- Hemphill County, Texas – 83 homes leveled, 116 damaged
- Texas total – $1,505,000
- Ellis County, Oklahoma – $1,264,000
  - 52 homes destroyed, 133 damaged
  - 223 other buildings destroyed, 107 damaged
- Woodward County, Oklahoma – $6,608,750
  - 430 homes destroyed, 650 damaged
  - 925 other buildings destroyed, 975 damaged
- Woods County, Oklahoma – $950,000
  - 25 homes destroyed, 34 damaged
  - 110 other buildings destroyed, 90 damaged
- Kansas total – $200,000

Total damage estimates were $173,489,564 (equivalent to $747,850,050 in 2008 dollars).

== See also ==
- Tornadoes of 1947

== Sources ==
- Agee, Ernest M.; Childs, Samuel (June 1, 2014). "Adjustments in Tornado Counts, F-Scale Intensity, and Path Width for Assessing Significant Tornado Destruction". Journal of Applied Meteorology and Climatology. 53 (6). American Meteorological Society: 1494–1505. Bibcode:2014JApMC..53.1494A. doi:10.1175/JAMC-D-13-0235.1.
- Bedard, Richard (1996). In the Shadow of the Tornado. Gilco Publishing. ISBN 0-9649527-1-8 – via Internet Archive.
- Brooks, Harold E. (April 2004). "On the Relationship of Tornado Path Length and Width to Intensity". Weather and Forecasting. 19 (2): 310–19. Bibcode:2004WtFor..19..310B. doi:10.1175/1520-0434(2004)019<0310:OTROTP>2.0.CO;2.
- Cook, A. R.; Schaefer, J. T. (August 2008). "The Relation of El Niño–Southern Oscillation (ENSO) to Winter Tornado Outbreaks". Monthly Weather Review. 136 (8): 3121–3137. Bibcode:2008MWRv..136.3121C. doi:10.1175/2007MWR2171.1.
- Edwards, Roger; LaDue, James G.; Ferree, John T.; Scharfenberg, Kevin; Maier, Chris; Coulbourne, William L. (May 1, 2013). "Tornado Intensity Estimation: Past, Present, and Future". Bulletin of the American Meteorological Society. 94 (5). American Meteorological Society: 641–653. Bibcode:2013BAMS...94..641E. doi:10.1175/BAMS-D-11-00006.1.
- Grazulis, Thomas P. (May 1984). Violent Tornado Climatography, 1880–1982. OSTI (Technical report). NUREG. Washington, D.C.: Nuclear Regulatory Commission. OSTI 7099491. CR-3670.
  - — (November 1990). Significant Tornadoes 1880–1989. Vol. 2. St. Johnsbury, Vermont: The Tornado Project of Environmental Films. ISBN 1-879362-02-3.
  - — (July 1993). Significant Tornadoes 1680–1991: A Chronology and Analysis of Events. St. Johnsbury, Vermont: The Tornado Project of Environmental Films. ISBN 1-879362-03-1.
  - — (2001a). The Tornado: Nature's Ultimate Windstorm. Norman: University of Oklahoma Press. ISBN 978-0-8061-3538-0 – via Internet Archive.
  - — (2001b). F5-F6 Tornadoes. St. Johnsbury, Vermont: The Tornado Project of Environmental Films.
- Sanders, Kellie R. (2008). "'The Wednesday Monster': The Glazier-Higgins-Woodward F5 Tornado of April 9, 1947". Panhandle-Plains Historical Review. 80: 23–44.

== External links and sources ==
- (http://docs.lib.noaa.gov/rescue/mwr/075/mwr-075-04-0070.pdf)
