= Stafford, Oklahoma =

Stafford
- Town
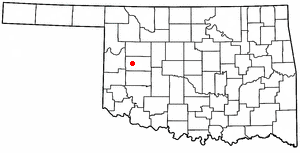
- Location of Stafford, Oklahoma
- Coordinates: 35°32′12″N 99°07′19″W
- Country: United States
- State: Oklahoma
- County: Custer
- Elevation: 1,770 ft (540 m)
- Time zone: UTC-6 (Central (CST))
  - Summer (DST): UTC-5 (CDT)

Stafford is an unincorporated community in Custer County in the U.S. state of Oklahoma, at the intersection of County Roads 2170 and 1020. It lies approximately six miles west of Clinton, seven miles southwest of the county seat Arapaho, and 10 miles southeast of Butler. The town sits on the east bank of the Washita River downstream from Foss Reservoir.

== History ==
Stafford was settled in the mid to late 1890s. It was primarily a farming community that provided services to area farmers, including two general stores, a post office, a wheat elevator, and a school. The Clinton and Oklahoma Western Railroad (later the Atchison, Topeka and Santa Fe Railway) was built through Stafford in 1909–1910. The line was abandoned in 1981. The U.S. post office was in operation from 1909 to 1955. The Stafford Consolidated School served area students until 1962, when it was consolidated with the Arapaho-Butler Public School District. The Stafford Cemetery is one mile east of town.

== Climate ==
Climate data for Stafford, Oklahoma
Month	Jan	Feb	Mar	Apr	May	Jun	Jul	Aug	Sep	Oct	Nov	Dec	Year
Mean daily maximum °F (°C)	47.8 (8.8)	53.1 (11.7)	62.2 (16.8)	72.9 (22.7)	80.5 (26.9)	89.4 (31.9)	95.6 (35.3)	93.3 (34.1)	84.6 (29.2)	74.4 (23.6)	60.2 (15.7)	49.9 (9.9)	72.0 (22.2)
Mean daily minimum °F (°C)	19.1 (−7.2)	24.4 (−4.2)	32.6 (0.3)	44.1 (6.7)	53.3 (11.8)	63.5 (17.5)	68.4 (20.2)	66.5 (19.2)	57.9 (14.4)	44.6 (7.0)	32.6 (0.3)	22.4 (−5.3)	44.1 (6.7)
Average precipitation inches (mm)	0.7 (18)	1.1 (28)	1.9 (48)	2.0 (51)	4.2 (110)	3.8 (97)	2.0 (51)	3.0 (76)	3.1 (79)	2.0 (51)	1.6 (41)	0.8 (20)	26.2 (670)
Source: Weatherbase.com
