= Indianapolis (disambiguation) =

Indianapolis is the capital and largest city of the U.S. state of Indiana.

Indianapolis may also refer to:

== Places in the United States ==
- Indianapolis (balance), a U.S. Census Bureau designation corresponding to that portion of the consolidated city-county entity of Indianapolis and Marion County that does not include any of the other incorporated places within the county
- Indianapolis, Iowa, in Mahaska County, roughly between Iowa City and Des Moines
- Indianapolis, Oklahoma, in Custer County

== Other ==
- USS Indianapolis, the name of four United States Navy ships
  - USS Indianapolis: Men of Courage, a 2016 movie based on the USS Indianapolis disaster
- Indianapolis Motor Speedway, an automobile racing circuit in an enclave of Indianapolis, Indiana
- Indianapolis 500, famous annual motor race at the speedway
- "Indianapolis" (song), a 1983 song by Menudo
- "Indianapolis," a song recorded by The Bottle Rockets
- Indianapolis corner, at the Circuit de la Sarthe
- Indianapolis (horse), champion trotting horse from New Zealand
- "Indianapolis" (Parks and Recreation), a third-season episode of the NBC sitcom Parks and Recreation

== See also ==
- Indianópolis, a Brazilian municipality located in the west of the state of Minas Gerais
- Indy (disambiguation)
