= Dead Women Crossing, Oklahoma =

Unincorporated community in Oklahoma, US

Coordinates: 35°34′04″N 98°39′03″W

Dead Women Crossing, also known as Dead Woman's Crossing, is an unincorporated community on Deer Creek northeast of Weatherford in Custer County, Oklahoma, United States, at an elevation of 1,509 feet (460 m). The community takes its name from the unsolved murder of a local woman.

== Origin of the name ==
On July 6, 1905, a schoolteacher named Katie DeWitt James filed for divorce. The next day, she carried her 14-month-old daughter Lulu Belle to a train station in Custer City. DeWitt James was going to visit her cousin who lived in Ripley. Her father Henry DeWitt came to bid farewell; her husband Martin James did not come to the station.

A few weeks later, DeWitt became concerned that he had not heard from his daughter. He contacted a sheriff, who suggested hiring a detective named Sam Bartell. Bartell started his investigation from Clinton, but nobody remembered seeing a woman and a baby there. Then on July 28, 1905, in Weatherford, Bartell learned that DeWitt James and her baby spent a night in the house of William Moore. They were brought to this house by Moore's sister-in-law Fannie Norton, a resident of Clinton who also was known as Mrs. Ham, and reputed to be a sex worker. In the morning Norton, DeWitt James, and the baby left in a buggy, headed for Hydro. Eyewitnesses reported that buggy entered a field near Deer Creek, and Norton came out alone approximately 45 minutes later. Norton returned to Moore's house, and then back to Clinton.

Later, Bartell discovered that two women and the baby were seen around Deer Creek. The detective also was able to find the baby. The witness testified that Norton left the baby with a boy, and asked him to take the baby home. The baby was unharmed, but her clothing was covered with blood.

While locals searched for DeWitt James, Bartell tracked down Norton, who denied she murdered Katie. Later that day, Norton committed suicide by poison.

On August 31, 1905, DeWitt James's remains were found near Deer Creek, about twenty miles east of Clinton. Her head was severed from her body. DeWitt James's father confirmed these were remains of his daughter. Martin James took custody of their daughter.

On September 5, 1905, Bartell closed the case upon finding the .38-caliber pistol that matched the wound found in Mrs. Dewitt James's head (the bullet of which was extracted from her left temple). It was determined that Mrs. Norton was in fact the murderer, even though Norton and Dewitt James previously lived together for a time and tried to kill Mr. Dewitt James. The motive for the murder of Mrs. Dewitt James by Mrs. Norton was apparently robbery: the $25 that Mrs. Dewitt James was known to have kept on her person.
