= Independence, Oklahoma =

- Ghost town
- Location within the state of Oklahoma
- Coordinates: 35°43′31″N 98°56′20″W
- Country: United States
- State: Oklahoma
- County: Custer
- Time zone: UTC-6 (Central (CST))
  - Summer (DST): UTC-5 (CDT)

Independence is a ghost town in Custer County, Oklahoma, United States. It was one of two communities established on the Cheyenne and Arapaho reservations before those reservations were opened to settlement in 1892. Independence had a post office from October 5, 1892, to July 15, 1922. A 1911 Custer County map shows the town due north of Custer City, Oklahoma and due west of Thomas, Oklahoma. At its peak, the community was served by two newspapers, the Independence Herald and Independence Courier. Ultimately, Independence failed after being bypassed by nearby railroads, and the townsite is now agricultural fields.
