= Owl Blacksmith Shop =

- U.S. National Register of Historic Places
- Location within Oklahoma
- Location: 208 W. Rainey, Weatherford, Oklahoma
- Coordinates: 35°31′29″N 98°42′35″W
- Area: less than one acre
- Built: 1913
- NRHP reference No.: 83002084
- Added to NRHP: July 27, 1983

The Owl Blacksmith Shop, at 208 W. Rainey in Weatherford, Oklahoma, is a historic blacksmith shop. It was bought by Lee Cotter Sr. in 1913, from the "Attabury Boys" who had operated before, perhaps from as early as 1898. It was listed on the National Register of Historic Places listings in Custer County, Oklahoma in 1983. It has also been known as Lee Cotter's Blacksmith Shop.

In 1983 it was still in operation, run by Lee Cotter, the son, who had been 6 years old when the place was bought.

A 2008 survey of historic resources mentioned it being in the fourth generation of use, and it being located on the original U.S. Route 66.
