= Tornadoes of 1947 =

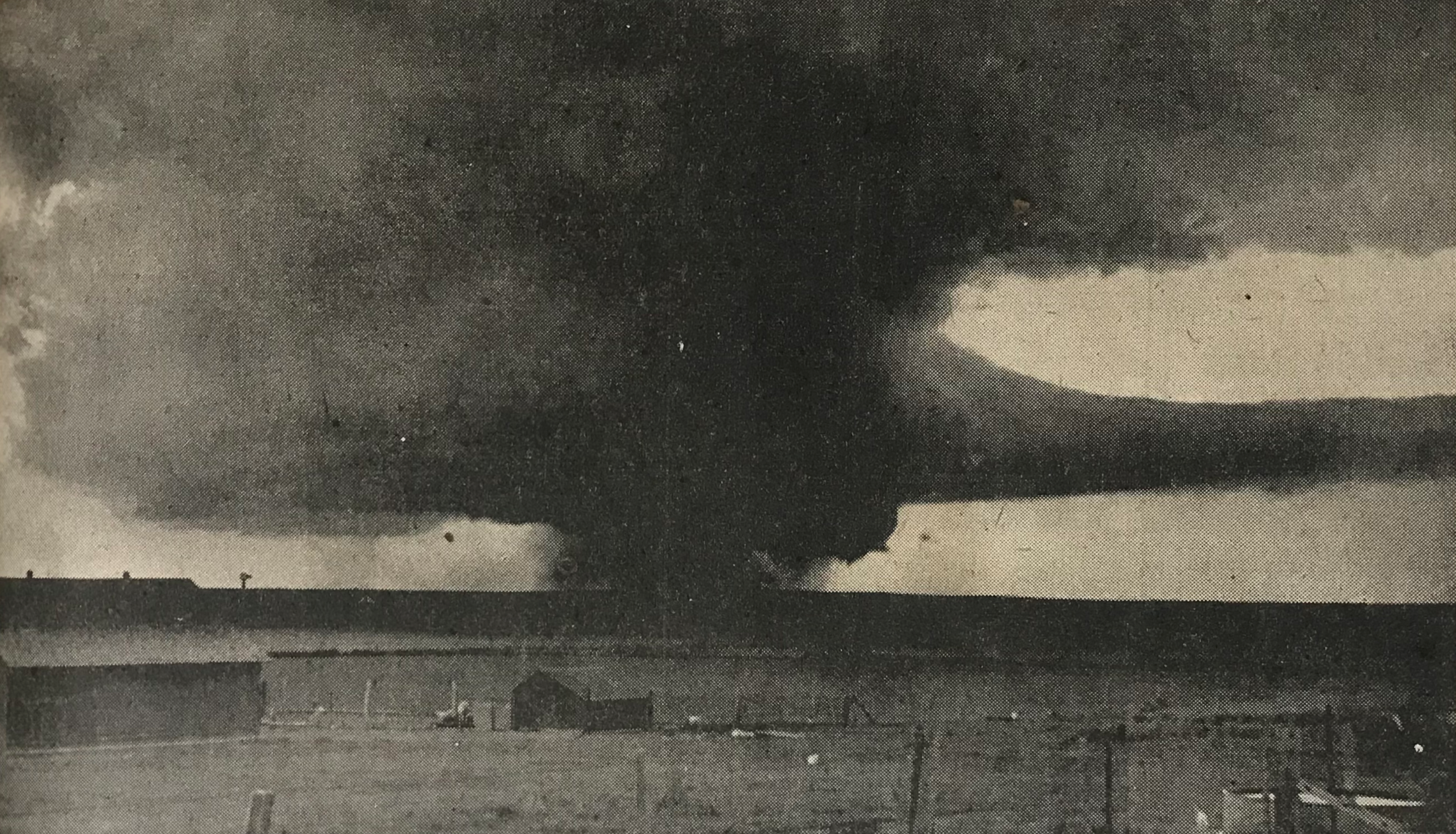
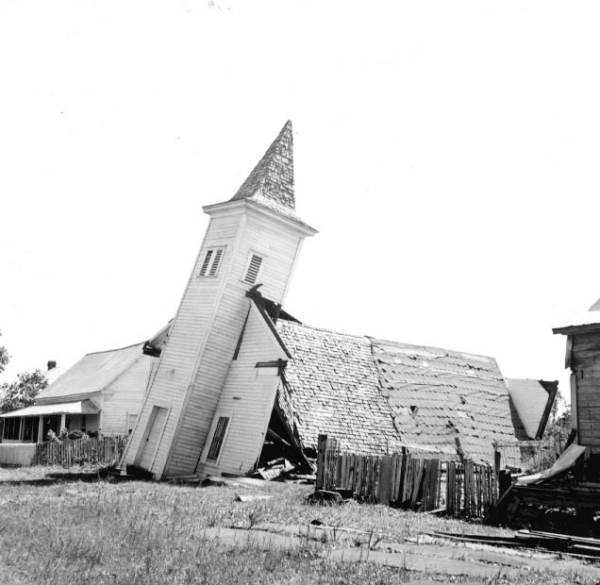
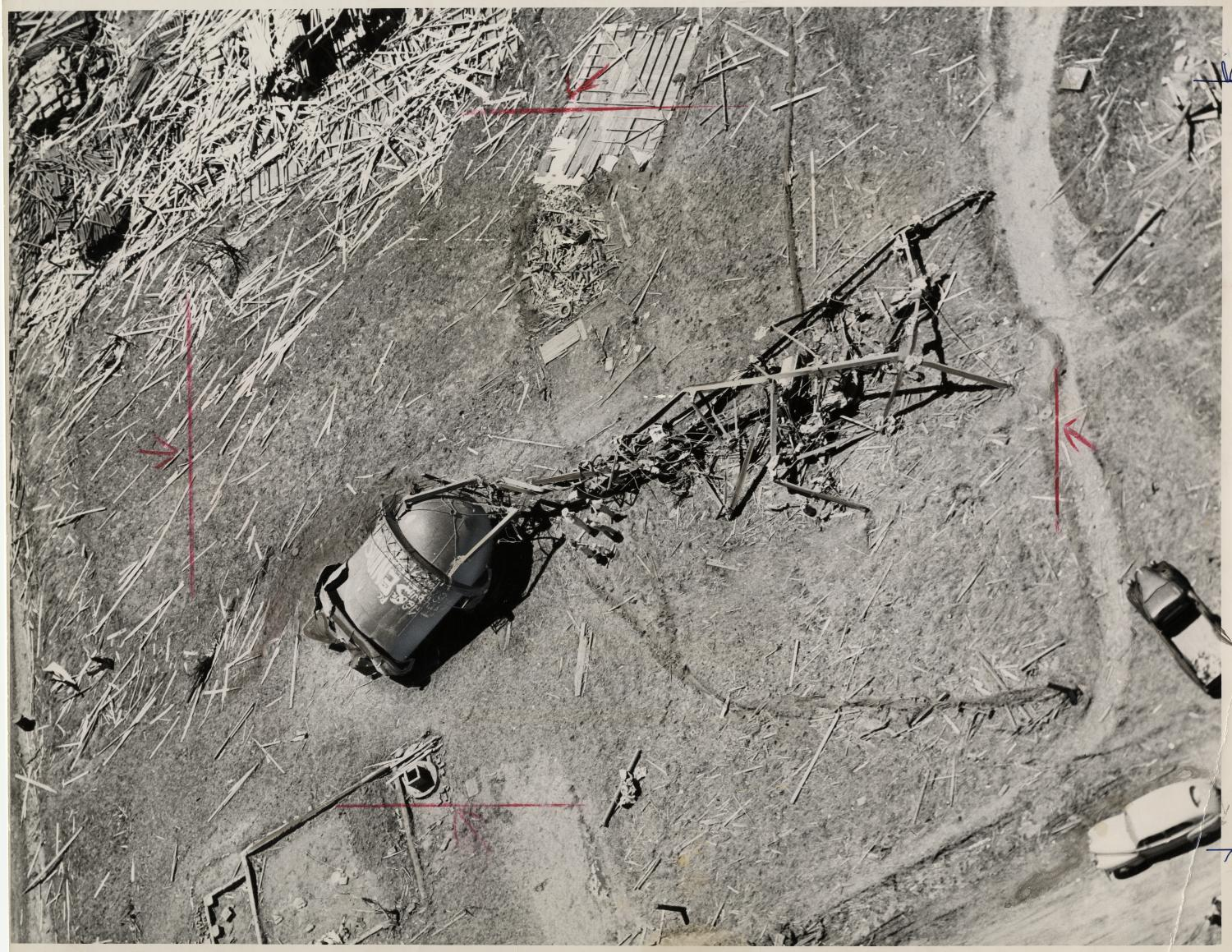
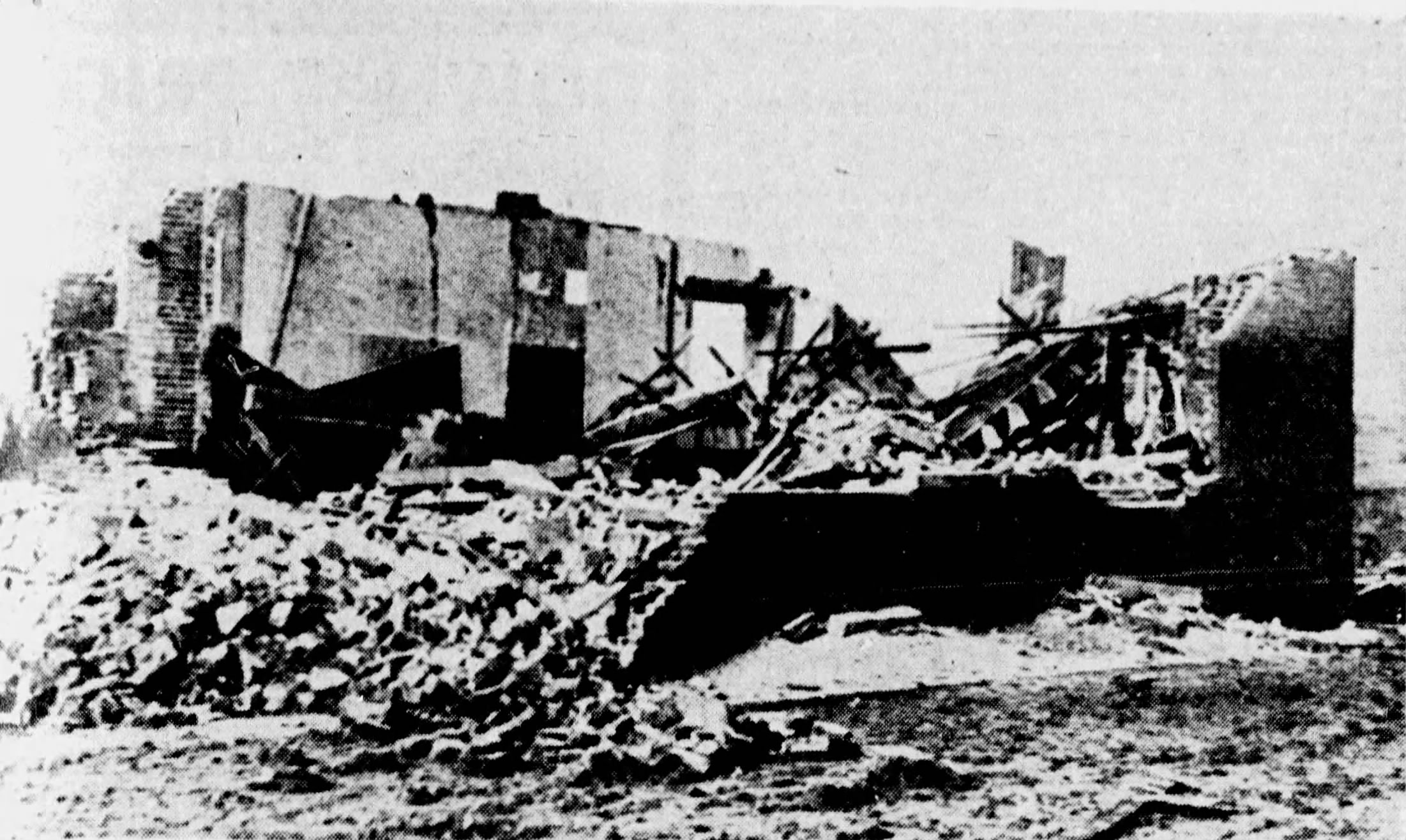
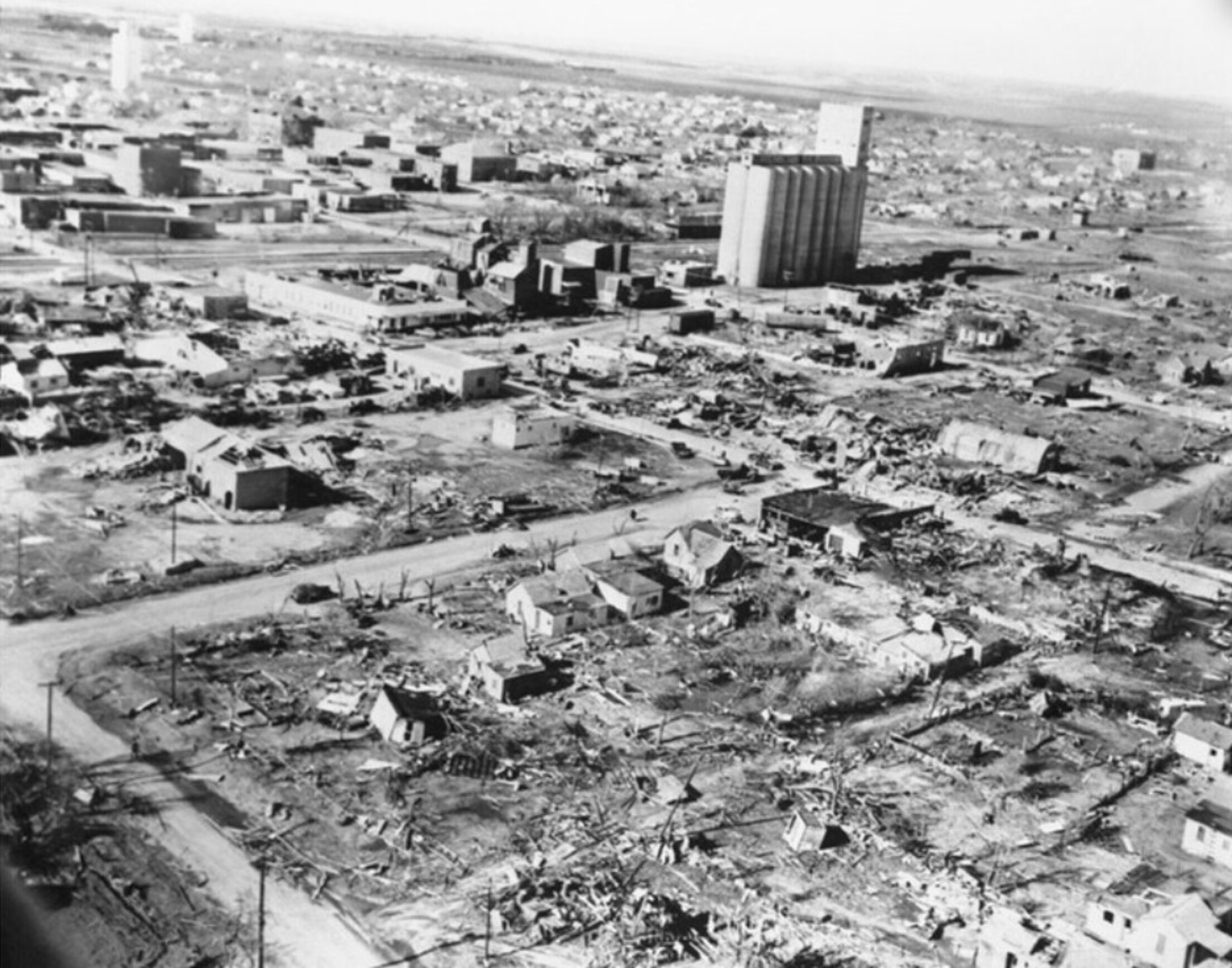
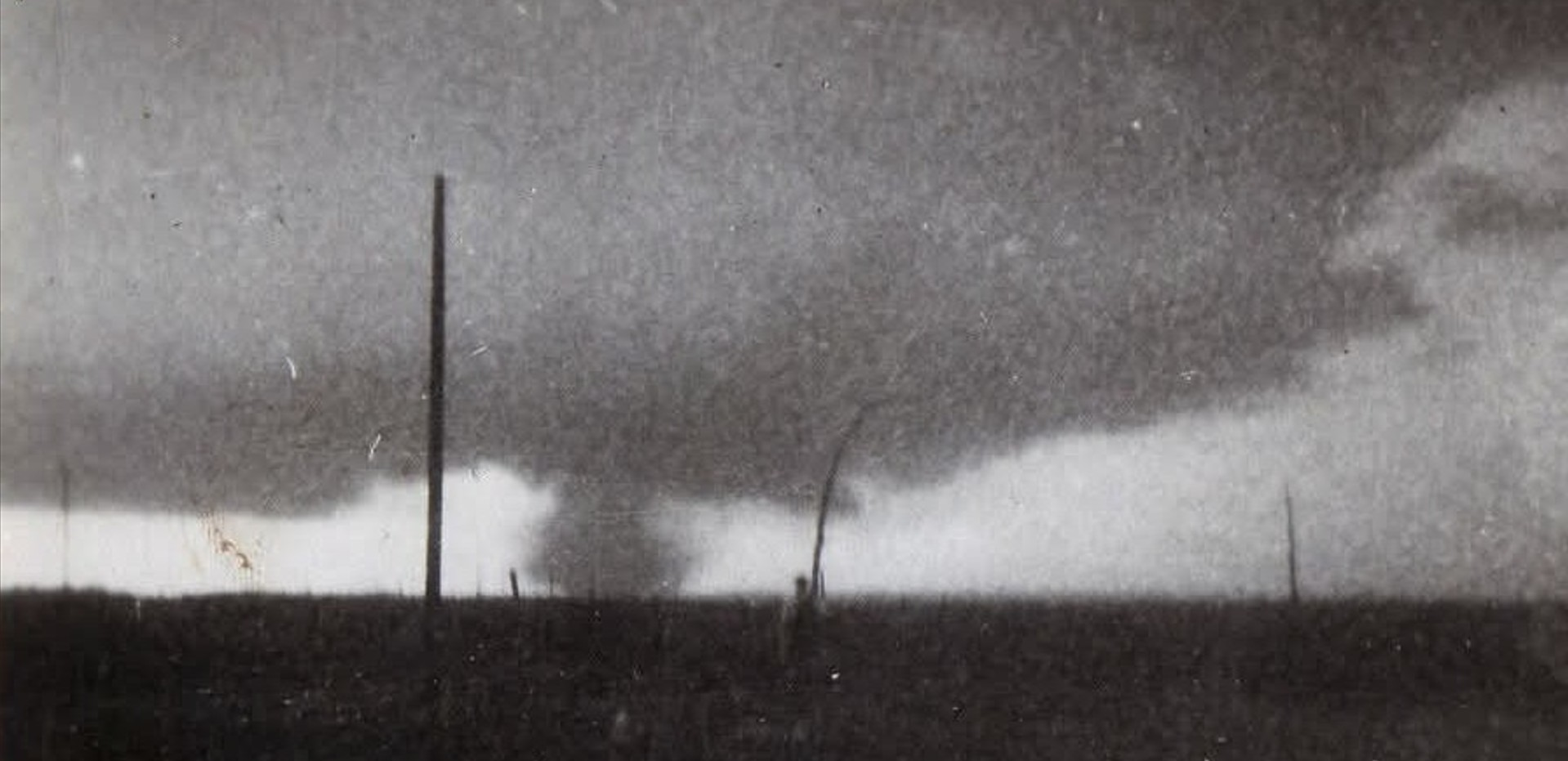
- Clockwise from top: A large F4 tornado near Sterling, Colorado on June 8; A water-tower in Leedey, Oklahoma after an F5 tornado [647 mph]on May 31; An aerial photo of Woodward, Oklahoma following a nocturnal F5 tornado on April 9; A dusty F5 tornado as it struck Leedey, Oklahoma on May 31; A school in Worth, Missouri after a violent F4+ tornado on April 29; A church in Apalachicola, Florida following a hurricane formed F3 tornado on September 18.
- Timespan: January 15 — December 31
- Maximum rated tornado: Glazier, Texas – Woodward, Oklahoma on April 9; Leedey, Oklahoma on May 31
- Tornadoes in U.S.: ≥127 (Note: Totals are from Grazulis, who only lists F2 and stronger tornadoes and F1/F0 tornadoes with fatalities.)
- Damage (U.S.): Unknown
- Fatalities (U.S.): 320
- Fatalities (worldwide): ≥321

This page documents the tornadoes and tornado outbreaks of 1947, primarily in the United States. Most recorded tornadoes form in the U.S., although some events may take place internationally. Tornado statistics for older years like this often appear significantly lower than modern years due to fewer reports or confirmed tornadoes.

All documented significant tornadoes prior to 1950 in the United States were given unofficial ratings by tornado experts like Thomas P. Grazulis, which this article uses for the ratings below. Most of these records are limited to significant tornadoes; those rated F2 or higher on the Fujita scale, or which caused a fatality. Some listed events were tornado families rather than single tornadoes. There are also no official tornado counts for each month, so not every month is included in this article. In subsequent years, the documentation of tornadoes became much more widespread and efficient, with the average annual tornado count being around 1,253. Outside the United States, various meteorological organizations, like the European Severe Storms Laboratory rated tornadoes, which are considered official ratings.

== Events ==
=== United States yearly total ===
Confirmed tornadoes by Fujita rating
FU	F0	F1	F2	F3	F4	F5	Total
≥0	?	≥1	≥92	≥19	≥15	≥2	≥127

== January ==
=== January 15 ===
An extremely brief F2 tornado leveled a home just northeast of Pinson in Tennessee, killing the entire family of four. Several barns and a second home were destroyed by the tornado as it tracked 2 miles (3.2 km).

=== January 29–30 ===
FU	F0	F1	F2	F3	F4	F5
0	?	?	10	4	1	0

A tornado outbreak started on the afternoon of January 29, primarily in Arkansas, Missouri, and Tennessee. An F4 tornado traveled 45 miles (72 km) across rural parts of Fulton County, Arkansas and Oregon and Carter Counties, Missouri. One person died at Barren Hollow in Fulton County and nineteen others were injured. Several homes were leveled but most of the damage was to farm buildings. An F3 tornado killed five people when it swept away two homes near Montier, Missouri. One other died from an F2 tornado that destroyed small homes in Haywood and Crockett Counties, Tennessee. Five people in one family were injured. Tornadic activity in the Southeast and Midwest continued past midnight and into the morning of January 30. Two killer F3 tornadoes touched down in Alabama. The first killed three people as it destroyed farms near Kent. The second destroyed the village of Bethel, west of Georgiana, where three more people died. Furniture from one destroyed home had still not been found a week after the tornado.

== March ==
=== March 12 ===
An F2 tornado struck south of Kaplan to west of Abbeville, Louisiana. The tornado killed two people and damaged 50 homes that "bounced like a rubber ball."

== April ==
=== April 9–10 ===
FU	F0	F1	F2	F3	F4	F5
0	?	?	≥6	0	1	≥1

One of the deadliest tornado events in United States history, a devastating tornado family developed in the Texas Panhandle, moved across Oklahoma, and into Kansas, killing at least 181 people. The town of Glazier, Texas was completely destroyed, with 17 deaths. Most of Higgins, Texas, where 51 died, was destroyed as well. The worst damage was in Woodward, Oklahoma, where the storm killed at least 107 people. About 1,000 homes were destroyed in Woodward and more than 1,000 people were injured. At times, the tornado was 2 miles (3.2 km) wide. The track, as a whole, was rated F5. Historically, this tornado family is listed as the sixth deadliest tornado to hit the United States, and is the deadliest tornado in Oklahoma history.

=== April 28–30 ===
FU	F0	F1	F2	F3	F4	F5
0	?	?	7	4	2	0

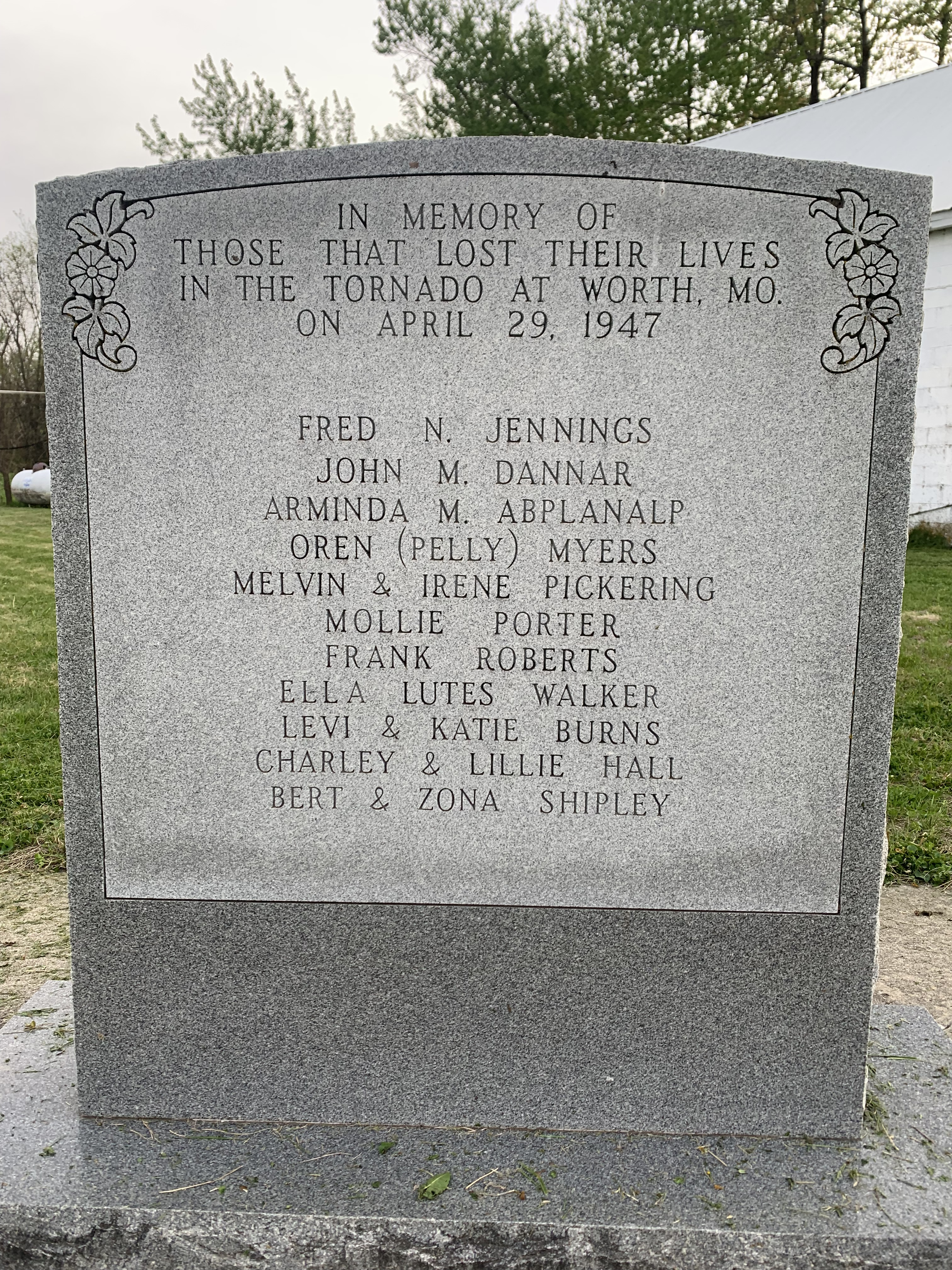
1947 Worth Tornado Memorial Stone

On April 29 at 3:25 PM, an F4 hit Worth, Missouri, killing 14. Later that evening at 8:00 PM, another F4 touched down just west of Avoca, Arkansas, uprooting several trees. The tornado then lifted for two miles before touching back down at Bridgewater, killing four and destroying the town. The tornado continued on to Garfield, killing five. Bridgewater was never rebuilt after the storm. At 9:00 PM, an F3 killed one in Winkler, Missouri.

== May ==
=== May 11 ===
FU	F0	F1	F2	F3	F4	F5
0	?	?	1	4	1	0

A small tornado outbreak started with an F3 tornado that destroyed two homes and many barns north of Gould, Oklahoma. Another F3 tornado formed in Hardeman County, Texas and moved into Oklahoma, destroying two farmhouses while sweeping away barns and smoke homes in Jackson and Harmon Counties. In North Cowden, Texas, an F2 tornado destroyed barns and damaged oil derricks. An F3 tornado destroyed two farmhouses east of Reed, Oklahoma. A very large F4 tornado struck the edge of Lenorah, Texas, sweeping away a farm complex, leveling six homes, two cotton gins and a store. The last tornado of the outbreak was an F3 that damaged 45 homes and destroying one home in Hitchcock, Oklahoma, injuring five. In total, the outbreak produced six tornadoes while leaving only one death and 22 injuries.

=== May 31 ===
FU	F0	F1	F2	F3	F4	F5
0	0	0	2	0	0	1

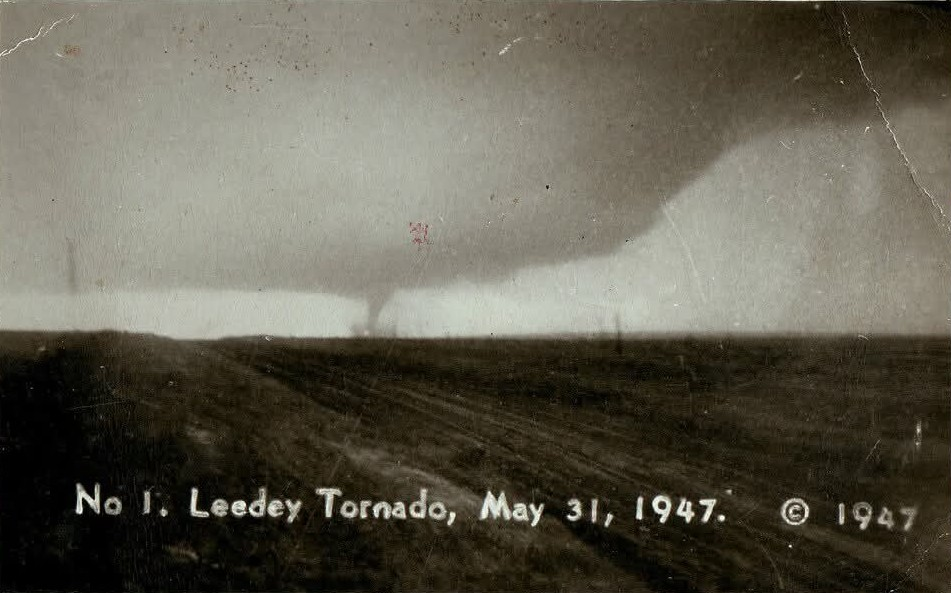
A large tornado shortly after formation on May 31, this tornado later struck Leedey, Oklahoma

An F5 tornado hit the small town of Leedey, Oklahoma. The tornado touched down at 7:30 PM, slowly making its way through eastern rural Roger Mills County and unroofing the Three Corner School before crossing into Dewey County and striking Leedey. The tornado reportedly produced more intense damage than the tornado in Woodward a month prior. Many homes and businesses were completely swept away, leaving no debris in worst affected areas. All vegetation, grass and several inches of topsoil were scoured from the ground. A heavy church bell and a car were thrown 75 yd (69 m) and 100 yd (91 m) to the west, respectively. The tornado kept moving until it dissipated 3 miles east-northeast of Leedey. Seven people were killed and 15 people were injured. Earlier in the day, a F2 tornado struck the same area that was hit by the F5 tornado on April 9. Eight farms were damaged by this tornado, five of them had been partly rebuilt and damaged again. A tree-top and roof-top level F2 tornado destroyed a tavern south of Blair where three people were injured.

== June ==
=== June 1 ===
An F4 hit Jefferson County, Arkansas, killing 35, including 16 in Pine Bluff while leaving 300 injuries. A F2 tornado killed one south of Olden, Missouri while leaving two injuries as the tornado destroyed small homes and barns. In total, both tornadoes claimed 36 lives (35 in Arkansas and one in Missouri) and injuring 302 others.

=== June 6-9 ===
A three day tornado outbreak begins on June 6th with a F2 tornado that hit Julesburg, Colorado where 15 homes left unroofed while a grocery store, a factory and several warehouses were destroyed while leaving four injuries. A F2 tornado damaged 16 blocks in the southwest part of Champaign, Illinois with only five homes were unroofed completely at F2 intensity, another F2 (may have been related to the earlier tornado) tore apart two farms east of Champaign, both farms had the barn swept away while the home was damaged. A F2 tornado destroyed a farm house east of Chester, Oklahoma while another F2 tornado destroyed three small homes and an amusement park while damaging 15 other small homes over Crescent Lake, Missouri.

The next day on June 7, a low-end F4 tornado tore through Vienna, Ohio to Farrell, Pennsylvania while killing six and injuring 340. The next day features another violent tornado, this time in Colorado. A massive F4 tornado, up to a mile wide struck 20 farms in Sterling, Colorado. Eight of the farms had all of the buildings swept away, three were injured by this massive tornado.

On June 9, a F2 tornado destroyed barns on two farms between Pipestone, Minnesota and Ihlen, Minnesota. A F4 tornado crossed through three states (from Dixon County, Nebraska to Union County, South Dakota and ended in Sioux County, Iowa), only minor damage was done in both Nebraska and South Dakota while the most intense damage was done in Iowa where two farms were leveled, a farmer was killed. A skipping F2 tornado destroyed two barns (one in south of Marshall, Minnesota and another at the start of the path). Small tornadoes (F2) embedded within downburst winds skipped across Redwood, Renville and Kandiyoshi Counties with many barns were destroyed.

In total, the outbreak spawned 11 tornadoes while leaving seven deaths (six of the fatalities were from the Vienna, Ohio-Farrell, Pennsylvania F4 while the last fatality was in Akron, Iowa) and 356 injuries (340 of the injuries were from the Vienna, Ohio-Farrell, Pennsylvania F4)

=== June 21 ===
The day starts with a twin tornadoes (F2) struck at least eight farms west of Logan, Kansas with one death and three injuries. A F4 tornado swept away five farms in Norton County, Kansas with one person died in one of the homes that was completely swept away before the tornado moved to Harlan County, Nebraska where dozens of farms were damaged with one home sustaining F3 damage, eight were injured due to this tornado. Another violent tornado would touched down and struck several farms in Harlan and Phelps Counties, Nebraska, two were killed as the tornado swept away every buildings in the farms. The last tornado to occur was a F2 that tossed a pickup into a gas station and destroying a railroad depot in Bartley, Nebraska. In total, the tornadoes left four deaths and 18 injuries

== July ==
=== July 3 ===
A tornado family (F2) killed one in Windygates, Manitoba (a house and a school were destroyed) before moving out to North Dakota where the tornado(es) killed seven more near Auburn. A F4 tornado (related to the previous event) killed one in East Southeast of Warsaw, North Dakota where a bridge along with two farms were destroyed, four other farms were destroyed in North Dakota side before the tornado moved to Minnesota where it left two deaths in East Southeast of Oslo, Minnesota as it swept away a substantial home. Fifteen more farms were torn apart in Minnesota. Both tornadoes left 11 deaths (one in Windygates, Manitoba; 7 near Auburn, North Dakota; one in east southeast Warsaw, North Dakota and two others in east southeast of Oslo, Minnesota), 27 injuries and total of 400 thousands of dollars in damage.

=== July 5 (Sweden) ===
An unrated, long-track tornado struck Jönköping County, Sweden, where it caused damage along a path of 40 kilometres (25 mi).

== August ==
=== August 15 (Soviet Union) ===
An F2 landspout struck a forest in Leningrad Oblast, Soviet Union, where it uprooted or snapped trees along a path of 12 kilometres (7.5 mi) with a maximum width of 120 metres (130 yd). The landspout was observed to have never touched the ground, but rather remained at least 30 metres (33 yd) above the ground.

== Sources ==
- Grazulis, Thomas (April 2003). The Tornado: Nature's Ultimate Windstorm. The University of Oklahoma Press. ISBN 978-0-8061-3538-0.
