= Carpenter, Oklahoma =

- Unincorporated community
- Location within the state of Oklahoma Carpenter (the United States)
- Coordinates: 35°31′49″N 99°22′18″W
- Country: United States
- State: Oklahoma
- Counties: Roger Mills / Custer
- Elevation: 1,946 ft (593 m)
- Time zone: UTC-6 (Central (CST))
  - Summer (DST): UTC-5 (CDT)
- GNIS feature ID: 1090986

Carpenter is an unincorporated community in Roger Mills and Custer counties in the state of Oklahoma, United States. The community is eight miles north of Elk City, Oklahoma.

It was named in commemoration of Benjamin Carpenter, an early settler of western Oklahoma who moved there from Texas in 1898. It was established as a Post Office on March 19, 1901, "named for Benjamin Carpenter, local rancher".
