= Arapaho, Oklahoma =

- Town
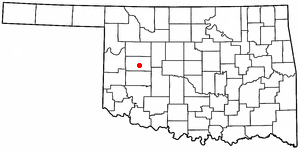
- Location of Arapaho, Oklahoma
- Coordinates: 35°34′40″N 98°57′34″W
- Country: United States
- State: Oklahoma
- County: Custer
- Established: 1892

Area
  - Total: 0.70 sq mi (1.81 km^{2})
  - Land: 0.70 sq mi (1.81 km^{2})
  - Water: 0 sq mi (0.00 km^{2})
- Elevation: 1,660 ft (510 m)

Population (2020)
  - Total: 668
  - Density: 955.8/sq mi (369.03/km^{2})
- Time zone: UTC-6 (Central (CST))
  - Summer (DST): UTC-5 (CDT)
- ZIP code: 73620
- Area code: 580
- FIPS code: 40-02500
- GNIS feature ID: 2412374

Arapaho is a town in and the county seat of Custer County, Oklahoma, United States. The population was 668 at the time of the 2020 census. The town lies long U.S. Route 183 and is named for the Arapaho Native American tribe.

== History ==
The area containing present Arapaho was surveyed by federally-contracted surveyors in 1891, prior to the Cheyenne-Arapaho land opening on April 19, 1892. A US post office was set up for the proposed community on March 23, 1892.

On April 19, 1892, the expected inrush of settlers did materialize; by sundown some 400 claims had been posted. The first town newspaper was issued 10 days later, titled The Arapahoe Arrow (by the end of the year its name had changed to The Arapahoe Bee).

Several Protestant church groups had been organized during the first few years. By 1894 the county courthouse and a school had been built. A lending library was in operation by May 1904.

The Oklahoma Territorial Legislature approved the incorporation on March 2, 1905 (Council Bill #80). The county courthouse had been lost in an 1896 fire, and was not replaced until 1935, built with Public Works Administration funds. It was enlarged in 1985.

== Geography ==
Arapaho is located along U.S. Route 183, north of Clinton.

According to the United States Census Bureau, the town has a total area of 0.7 square miles (1.8 km^{2}), all land.

=== Climate ===
Climate data for Arapaho, Oklahoma
Month	Jan	Feb	Mar	Apr	May	Jun	Jul	Aug	Sep	Oct	Nov	Dec	Year
Mean daily maximum °F (°C)	49.1 (9.5)	54.4 (12.4)	64.5 (18.1)	74.6 (23.7)	82.4 (28.0)	91 (33)	97.1 (36.2)	95.7 (35.4)	86.5 (30.3)	75.7 (24.3)	61.7 (16.5)	51.2 (10.7)	73.7 (23.2)
Mean daily minimum °F (°C)	24.0 (−4.4)	28.5 (−1.9)	37.0 (2.8)	47.3 (8.5)	56.6 (13.7)	65.7 (18.7)	70.4 (21.3)	69.0 (20.6)	61.2 (16.2)	49.2 (9.6)	37.3 (2.9)	27.4 (−2.6)	47.8 (8.8)
Average precipitation inches (mm)	0.9 (23)	1.2 (30)	2.0 (51)	2.3 (58)	4.9 (120)	4.2 (110)	2.1 (53)	3.2 (81)	3.7 (94)	2.8 (71)	1.8 (46)	1.0 (25)	30.2 (770)
Source: Weatherbase.com

== Public education ==
The public education system of the town is combined with that of nearby Butler. The Arapaho-Butler Public School District operates an elementary school (pre K-6th grade) and a high school (7th-12th grade). Both schools are located in Arapaho, adjacent to each other on north 12th Avenue. The two schools had a combined enrollment of 280 in 2000.

== Demographics ==
Historical population
Census	Pop.	Note	%±
1900	253		—
1910	713		181.8%
1920	326		−54.3%
1930	414		27.0%
1940	401		−3.1%
1950	311		−22.4%
1960	351		12.9%
1970	531		51.3%
1980	851		60.3%
1990	802		−5.8%
2000	748		−6.7%
2010	796		6.4%
2020	668		−16.1%
U.S. Decennial Census

=== 2020 census ===
As of the 2020 census, Arapaho had a population of 668. The median age was 36.9 years. 25.7% of residents were under the age of 18 and 16.6% of residents were 65 years of age or older. For every 100 females there were 105.5 males, and for every 100 females age 18 and over there were 113.8 males age 18 and over.

0.0% of residents lived in urban areas, while 100.0% lived in rural areas.

There were 245 households in Arapaho, of which 41.6% had children under the age of 18 living in them. Of all households, 51.8% were married-couple households, 16.3% were households with a male householder and no spouse or partner present, and 24.9% were households with a female householder and no spouse or partner present. About 22.4% of all households were made up of individuals and 11.8% had someone living alone who was 65 years of age or older.

There were 277 housing units, of which 11.6% were vacant. The homeowner vacancy rate was 0.0% and the rental vacancy rate was 8.6%.

Racial composition as of the 2020 census
Race	Number	Percent
White	515	77.1%
Black or African American	12	1.8%
American Indian and Alaska Native	62	9.3%
Asian	5	0.7%
Native Hawaiian and Other Pacific Islander	1	0.1%
Some other race	7	1.0%
Two or more races	66	9.9%
Hispanic or Latino (of any race)	72	10.8%

=== 2010 census ===
As of the 2010 census, there were 796 people living in the town. The population density was 1,067.4 inhabitants per square mile (412.1/km^{2}). There were 289 housing units at an average density of 426 per square mile (164/km^{2}). The racial makeup of the town was 87.03% White, 1.20% African American, 5.88% Native American, 1.07% Asian, 2.41% from other races, and 2.41% from two or more races. Hispanic or Latino of any race were 5.61% of the population.

There were 265 households, out of which 41.9% had children under the age of 18 living with them, 60.0% were married couples living together, 12.1% had a female householder with no husband present, and 22.3% were non-families. 21.1% of all households were made up of individuals, and 11.7% had someone living alone who was 65 years of age or older. The average household size was 2.66 and the average family size was 3.07.

In the town, the population was spread out, with 29.1% under the age of 18, 7.9% from 18 to 24, 28.6% from 25 to 44, 23.5% from 45 to 64, and 10.8% who were 65 years of age or older. The median age was 35 years. For every 100 females, there were 97.9 males. For every 100 females age 18 and over, there were 97.8 males.

The median income for a household in the town was $34,271, and the median income for a family was $36,339. Males had a median income of $26,375 versus $20,972 for females. The per capita income for the town was $14,645. About 13.7% of families and 16.1% of the population were below the poverty line, including 24.3% of those under age 18 and 3.1% of those age 65 or over.
