= Indianapolis, Oklahoma =

Coordinates: 35°33′05″N 98°51′45″W

- Ghost town
- Interactive map of Indianapolis, Oklahoma
- Country: United States
- State: Oklahoma
- County: Custer
- Settled: 1890
- Elevation: 1,669 ft (509 m)

Population (2010)
  - Total: 0
  - Density: 0/sq mi (0/km^{2})
- Time zone: UTC-6 (Central (CST))
  - Summer (DST): UTC-5 (CDT)
- Area code: 580

Indianapolis, Oklahoma is a former unincorporated community in Custer County, Oklahoma. A 1911 Custer County map shows the locale northeast of Clinton, Oklahoma on the Chicago, Rock Island and Pacific Railroad line. It was inhabited from the 1800s to the late 1900s.

== Climate ==
Climate data for Custer County, Oklahoma
Month	Jan	Feb	Mar	Apr	May	Jun	Jul	Aug	Sep	Oct	Nov	Dec	Year
Mean daily maximum °F (°C)	49.1 (9.5)	54.4 (12.4)	64.5 (18.1)	74.6 (23.7)	82.4 (28.0)	91 (33)	97.1 (36.2)	95.7 (35.4)	86.5 (30.3)	75.7 (24.3)	61.7 (16.5)	51.2 (10.7)	73.7 (23.2)
Mean daily minimum °F (°C)	24.0 (−4.4)	28.5 (−1.9)	37.0 (2.8)	47.3 (8.5)	56.6 (13.7)	65.7 (18.7)	70.4 (21.3)	69.0 (20.6)	61.2 (16.2)	49.2 (9.6)	37.3 (2.9)	27.4 (−2.6)	47.8 (8.8)
Average precipitation inches (mm)	0.9 (23)	1.2 (30)	2.0 (51)	2.3 (58)	4.9 (120)	4.2 (110)	2.1 (53)	3.2 (81)	3.7 (94)	2.8 (71)	1.8 (46)	1.0 (25)	30.2 (770)
Source: Weatherbase.com
