= Broadway Hotel (Salt Lake City) =

Historic building in Salt Lake City, Utah, U.S.

- U.S. National Register of Historic Places
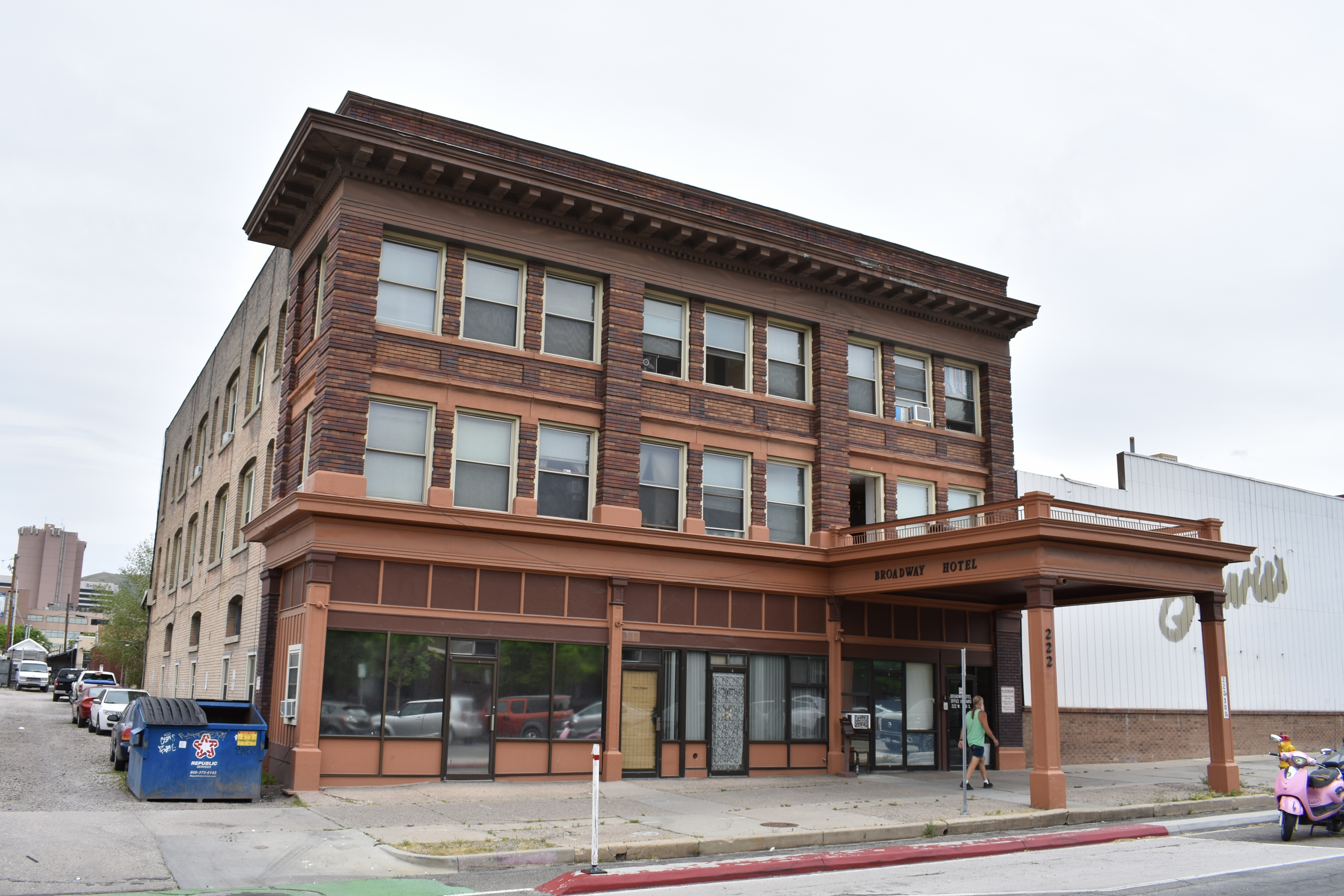
- Broadway Hotel, May 2019

- Location within Utah Location within the United States
- Location: 222 West 300 South; Salt Lake City, Utah; United States
- Coordinates: 40°45′47″N 111°53′49″W
- Area: 0 acres (0 ha)
- Built: 1912
- Architect: Mecklenburg, Bernard O.
- Architectural style: Early Commercial
- MPS: Salt Lake City Business District MRA
- NRHP reference No.: 82004132
- Added to NRHP: August 17, 1982

The Broadway Hotel is a historic hotel in Salt Lake City, Utah, United States.

== Description ==
The 3-story building was designed by Bernard O. Mecklenburg and constructed in 1912. Original owners were Samuel and David Spitz. The brick building features a denticulated cornice and a prominent portico above the hotel entrance. The hotel was added to the National Register of Historic Places in 1982, and it is now a contributing resource of the Warehouse District.

Salt Lake City buildings designed by architect Bernard Ollington Mecklenburg include the Broadway Hotel, Holy Cross Hospital, renamed Salt Lake Regional Medical Center, and the Mecklenburg Apartments, renamed the Maryland Apartments.

== See also ==
- National Register of Historic Places listings in Salt Lake City
