= First National Bank of Custer City =

- U.S. National Register of Historic Places
- Location within Oklahoma
- Location: Off State Highway 33, Custer, Oklahoma
- Coordinates: 35.66432°N 98.88372°W
- Area: less than one acre
- Built: 1903
- MPS: Custer City Commercial Buildings TR
- NRHP reference No.: 85003426
- Added to NRHP: October 31, 1985

First National Bank of Custer City, in Custer City, Oklahoma, was built in 1903. It was listed on the National Register of Historic Placesin 1985.

It is a two-story red brick building, 30 by 80 feet (9.1 m × 24.4 m) in plan. Its only decorative architectural element is a corner parapet with "1903" and "First National Bank" spelled out in white-painted concrete letters.
