= Arapaho-Butler Public School District =

School district in Oklahoma

Location
- P.O. Box 160; Arapaho, Oklahoma 73620-0160 United States

District information
- Type: Public
- Grades: pre-k-12
- Established: 1892
- Superintendent: Jay Edelen
- NCES District ID: 4003120

Students and staff
- District mascot: Indian
- Colors: Blue and gold

Other information
- Principals: High school: Jared Cudd; Elementary school: Brad Southall
- Website: www.arapaho.k12.ok.us

The Arapaho Independent School District No. 5, also known as Arapaho-Butler Public Schools, is a school district based in Arapaho, Oklahoma, United States]. It contains an elementary school and a combined middle/high school.

The district includes Arapaho and Butler.

== History ==
In 1989, the Arapaho district's enrollment was 320. By 1989, the administration of the Arapaho district and other area districts began talks about having a single common high school due to financial issues occurring in the three districts.

In 2008, the Butler Public Schools was seeking a merger with the Arapaho district. That year, the Butler district merged into the Arapaho school district, with the merged district to have a new common identity. The State of Oklahoma's lottery funds were used to encourage a voluntary merger, and the merged district received $360,000. The Arapaho district received the property of the Butler district.

== See also ==
List of school districts in Oklahoma
