= Broadway Hotel (Custer City, Oklahoma) =

- U.S. National Register of Historic Places
- Location within Oklahoma Location within the United States
- Location: Off OK 33, Custer, Oklahoma
- Coordinates: 35°39′56″N 98°53′0″W
- Built: 1908
- MPS: Custer City Commercial Buildings TR
- NRHP reference No.: 85000489
- Added to NRHP: March 6, 1985

Broadway Hotel in Custer City, Oklahoma, is a two-story hotel building that was built in 1908. It was listed on the National Register of Historic Places in 1985.

It has 12 hotel rooms and, as of 1988, was the only commercial business in Custer City that had operated in the same building since the town's early days.
