= Glazier, Texas =

- Census-designated place
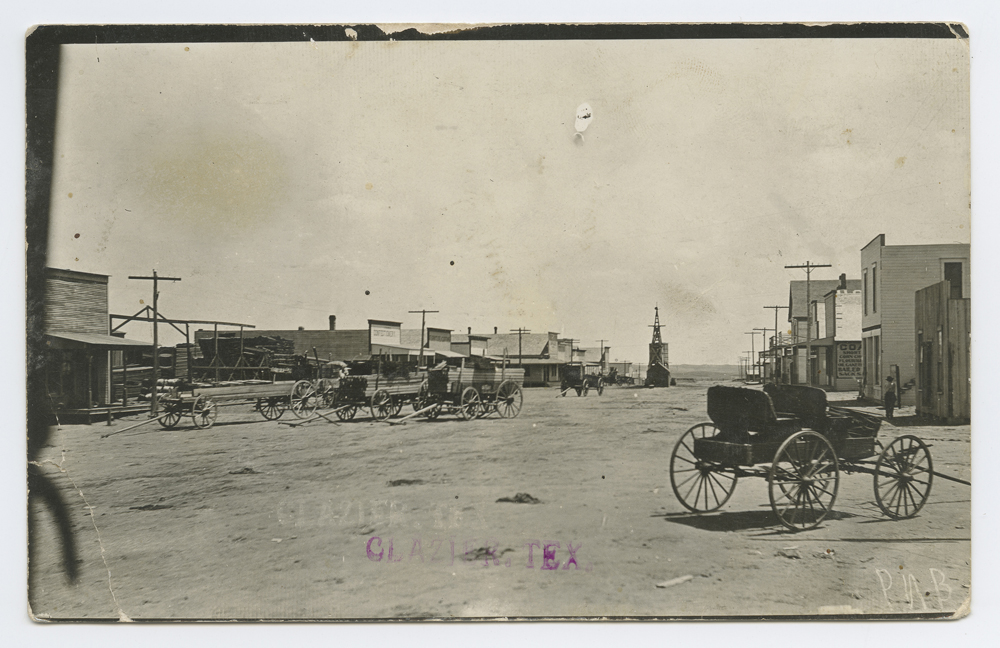
- Glazier in the 1900s or 1910s

- Location within Texas Location within the United States
- Coordinates: 36°0′49″N 100°16′13″W
- Country: United States
- State: Texas
- County: Hemphill

Government

Area
  - Total: 1.29 sq mi (3.33 km^{2})
- Elevation: 2,628 ft (801 m)

Population (2020)
  - Total: 60
  - Density: 47/sq mi (18/km^{2})
- Time zone: UTC-6 (Central (CST))
  - Summer (DST): UTC-5 (CDT)
- GNIS feature ID: 2805788

Glazier is an unincorporated community and census-designated place (CDP) in Hemphill County, Texas, United States. It lies at the intersection of U.S. Highway 60 and State Highway 305, to the northeast of the city of Canadian, the county seat of Hemphill County. Local addresses are served by the 79014 ZIP code of the post office in Canadian. As of the 2020 census, Glazier had a population of 60.

Every structure in Glazier except one house and the town's jail was destroyed by a violent tornado on April 9, 1947, and 17 people were killed.

It is in the Canadian Independent School District.

== Climate ==
According to the Köppen climate classification, Glazier has a semiarid climate, BSk on climate maps.

== Demographics ==
=== 2020 Census ===
Glazier CDP, Texas – Racial and ethnic composition Note: the US Census treats Hispanic/Latino as an ethnic category. This table excludes Latinos from the racial categories and assigns them to a separate category. Hispanics/Latinos may be of any race.
Race / Ethnicity (NH = non-Hispanic)	Pop. 2020	Percentage
White alone (NH)	52	86.67%
Asian alone (NH)	1	1.67%
Hispanic or Latino (any race)	7	11.67%
Total	60	100.00%
