= Custer City, Oklahoma =

- Town
- Location within Oklahoma
- Coordinates: 35°39′50″N 98°53′13″W
- Country: United States
- State: Oklahoma
- County: Custer

Area
  - Total: 0.61 sq mi (1.57 km^{2})
  - Land: 0.61 sq mi (1.57 km^{2})
  - Water: 0 sq mi (0.00 km^{2})
- Elevation: 1,768 ft (539 m)

Population (2020)
  - Total: 367
  - Density: 604.2/sq mi (233.28/km^{2})
- Time zone: UTC-6 (Central (CST))
  - Summer (DST): UTC-5 (CDT)
- ZIP code: 73639
- Area code: 580
- FIPS code: 40-18950
- GNIS feature ID: 2412398

Custer City is a town in Custer County, Oklahoma, United States. Custer City is northeast of Clinton and northwest of Weatherford along Oklahoma 33. The population was 367 at the time of the 2020 census.

Custer City was originally known as Graves, and a post office was established there on January 22, 1894. The post office changed its name to Custer City on September 28, 1904, in honor of Lt. Col. George Armstrong Custer.

== Geography ==
According to the United States Census Bureau, the town has a total area of 0.6 square miles (1.6 km^{2}), all land.

== Demographics ==
Historical population
Census	Pop.	Note	%±
1910	854		—
1920	671		−21.4%
1930	698		4.0%
1940	641		−8.2%
1950	479		−25.3%
1960	448		−6.5%
1970	486		8.5%
1980	530		9.1%
1990	443		−16.4%
2000	393		−11.3%
2010	375		−4.6%
2020	367		−2.1%
U.S. Decennial Census

=== 2020 census ===
As of the 2020 census, Custer City had a population of 367. The median age was 36.3 years. 28.1% of residents were under the age of 18 and 16.3% of residents were 65 years of age or older. For every 100 females there were 85.4 males, and for every 100 females age 18 and over there were 94.1 males age 18 and over.

0.0% of residents lived in urban areas, while 100.0% lived in rural areas.

There were 138 households in Custer City, of which 40.6% had children under the age of 18 living in them. Of all households, 44.2% were married-couple households, 18.8% were households with a male householder and no spouse or partner present, and 30.4% were households with a female householder and no spouse or partner present. About 20.3% of all households were made up of individuals and 7.2% had someone living alone who was 65 years of age or older.

There were 185 housing units, of which 25.4% were vacant. The homeowner vacancy rate was 6.3% and the rental vacancy rate was 11.1%.

Racial composition as of the 2020 census
Race	Number	Percent
White	240	65.4%
Black or African American	6	1.6%
American Indian and Alaska Native	12	3.3%
Asian	0	0.0%
Native Hawaiian and Other Pacific Islander	0	0.0%
Some other race	6	1.6%
Two or more races	103	28.1%
Hispanic or Latino (of any race)	46	12.5%

=== 2000 census ===
As of the 2000 census, there were 393 people, 169 households, and 110 families residing in the town. The population density was 653.2 inhabitants per square mile (252.2/km^{2}). There were 206 housing units at an average density of 342.4 per square mile (132.2/km^{2}). The racial makeup of the town was 94.66% White, 3.56% Native American, 0.51% from other races, and 1.27% from two or more races. Hispanic or Latino of any race were 1.53% of the population.

There were 169 households, out of which 29.0% had children under the age of 18 living with them, 56.2% were married couples living together, 5.9% had a female householder with no husband present, and 34.9% were non-families. 32.5% of all households were made up of individuals, and 13.0% had someone living alone who was 65 years of age or older. The average household size was 2.33 and the average family size was 2.93.

In the town, the population was spread out, with 24.4% under the age of 18, 8.7% from 18 to 24, 23.4% from 25 to 44, 26.5% from 45 to 64, and 17.0% who were 65 years of age or older. The median age was 39 years. For every 100 females, there were 95.5 males. For every 100 females age 18 and over, there were 103.4 males.

The median income for a household in the town was $30,500, and the median income for a family was $39,000. Males had a median income of $33,571 versus $13,409 for females. The per capita income for the town was $15,165. About 18.4% of families and 27.1% of the population were below the poverty line, including 54.8% of those under age 18 and 14.1% of those age 65 or over.

== Historical Sites ==
Custer City has three NRHP-listed sites:

- Broadway Hotel
- First National Bank of Custer City
- J.J. Pyeatt’s General Store (off SH-33)

== Education ==
It is in the Thomas-Fay-Custer Unified Schools school district.

Previously Custer City had its own school district. In 1989, the district's enrollment was 200.

== Notable people ==
- William Brinkley (1917–1993), author and reporter
- Tom Turner (1916-1986), Major League Baseball player
