= National Register of Historic Places listings in Dewey County, Oklahoma =

Location of Dewey County in Oklahoma

This is a list of the National Register of Historic Places listings in Dewey County, Oklahoma.

This is intended to be a complete list of the properties on the National Register of Historic Places in Dewey County, Oklahoma, United States. The locations of National Register properties for which the latitude and longitude coordinates are included below, may be seen in a map.

There are 4 properties listed on the National Register in the county.

This National Park Service list is complete through NPS recent listings posted March 21, 2025.

== Current listings ==
	Name on the Register	Image	Date listed	Location	City or town	Description
1	Dewey County Courthouse		March 22, 1985 (#85000680)	Broadway and Ruble St. 36°02′18″N 98°57′51″W	Taloga	
2	McAllister House	McAllister House	February 27, 1997 (#97000196)	311 N. Locust St. 36°08′52″N 98°55′19″W	Seiling	
3	Seiling Milling Company	Seiling Milling Company	December 8, 1983 (#83004167)	4th and Orange St. 36°08′56″N 98°55′43″W	Seiling	
4	Vici M-K-T Depot	Vici M-K-T Depot	September 6, 2007 (#07000911)	Houser St. between 7th St. and 8th St. 36°09′04″N 99°17′47″W	Vici	

== See also ==
- List of National Historic Landmarks in Oklahoma
- National Register of Historic Places listings in Oklahoma
