= Putnam, Oklahoma =

- Town
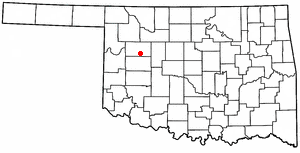
- Location of Putnam, Oklahoma
- Coordinates: 35°51′21″N 98°58′06″W
- Country: United States
- State: Oklahoma
- County: Dewey

Area
  - Total: 0.085 sq mi (0.22 km^{2})
  - Land: 0.085 sq mi (0.22 km^{2})
  - Water: 0 sq mi (0.00 km^{2})
- Elevation: 1,965 ft (599 m)

Population (2020)
  - Total: 30
  - Density: 354.1/sq mi (136.71/km^{2})
- Time zone: UTC-6 (Central (CST))
  - Summer (DST): UTC-5 (CDT)
- ZIP code: 73659
- Area code: 580
- FIPS code: 40-61250
- GNIS feature ID: 2412512

Putnam is a town in Dewey County, Oklahoma, United States. The population was 30 as of the 2020 United States census. The community lies along U.S. Route 183.

== Geography ==
Putnam is located in southern Dewey County. Via US 183 it is 13 miles (21 km) north to Taloga, the county seat, and 22 miles (35 km) to Seiling. To the south on 183, it is 23 miles (37 km) to Clinton.

According to the United States Census Bureau, Putnam has a total area of 0.10 square miles (0.26 km^{2}), all land.

== Demographics ==
Historical population
Census	Pop.	Note	%±
1930	140		—
1940	142		1.4%
1950	106		−25.4%
1960	83		−21.7%
1970	84		1.2%
1980	74		−11.9%
1990	44		−40.5%
2000	46		4.5%
2010	29		−37.0%
2020	30		3.4%
U.S. Decennial Census

=== 2020 census ===
As of the 2020 census, Putnam had a population of 30. The median age was 45.5 years. 23.3% of residents were under the age of 18 and 16.7% of residents were 65 years of age or older. For every 100 females there were 76.5 males, and for every 100 females age 18 and over there were 64.3 males age 18 and over.

0.0% of residents lived in urban areas, while 100.0% lived in rural areas.

There were 8 households in Putnam, of which 12.5% had children under the age of 18 living in them. Of all households, 75.0% were married-couple households, 0.0% were households with a male householder and no spouse or partner present, and 12.5% were households with a female householder and no spouse or partner present. About 12.5% of all households were made up of individuals and 0.0% had someone living alone who was 65 years of age or older.

There were 17 housing units, of which 52.9% were vacant. The homeowner vacancy rate was 0.0% and the rental vacancy rate was 100.0%.

Racial composition as of the 2020 census
Race	Number	Percent
White	26	86.7%
Black or African American	0	0.0%
American Indian and Alaska Native	0	0.0%
Asian	0	0.0%
Native Hawaiian and Other Pacific Islander	0	0.0%
Some other race	0	0.0%
Two or more races	4	13.3%
Hispanic or Latino (of any race)	4	13.3%

=== 2000 census ===
As of the census of 2000, there were 46 people, 20 households, and 16 families residing in the town. The population density was 455.1 inhabitants per square mile (175.7/km^{2}). There were 30 housing units at an average density of 296.8 per square mile (114.6/km^{2}). The racial makeup of the town was 97.83% White and 2.17% Native American. Hispanic or Latino of any race were 2.17% of the population.

There were 20 households, out of which 35.0% had children under the age of 18 living with them, 70.0% were married couples living together, 10.0% had a female householder with no husband present, and 20.0% were non-families. 20.0% of all households were made up of individuals, and 10.0% had someone living alone who was 65 years of age or older. The average household size was 2.30 and the average family size was 2.56.

In the town, the population was spread out, with 21.7% under the age of 18, 28.3% from 25 to 44, 34.8% from 45 to 64, and 15.2% who were 65 years of age or older. The median age was 44 years. For every 100 females, there were 130.0 males. For every 100 females age 18 and over, there were 125.0 males.

The median income for a household in the town was $40,417, and the median income for a family was $42,083. Males had a median income of $16,875 versus $15,625 for females. The per capita income for the town was $17,928. There were no families and 3.4% of the population living below the poverty line, including no under eighteens and none of those over 64.
