= Bertha Little Coyote =

Cheyenne author, artist and singer (1912–2003)

- E-no-ze
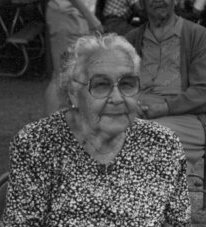
- Little Coyote in 1996
- Born: February 3, 1912; Carlton, Oklahoma, U.S.
- Died: February 2, 2003 (aged 90); Seiling, Oklahoma, U.S.
- Citizenship: Cheyenne and Arapaho Tribes, American
- Occupation(s): Author, artist, and singer
- Notable work: Leaving Everything Behind: The Songs and Memories of a Cheyenne Woman

Bertha Blackbeard Little Coyote (February 3, 1912 – February 2, 2003) was a Cheyenne author, artist, and singer from Oklahoma, United States. She was known for her book, Leaving Everything Behind, which described her history at an Indian boarding school, as well as her participation in music, lyricism and moccasin art.

== Biography ==
Bertha Blackbeard Little Coyote was born on February 3, 1912, in Canton, Oklahoma, at the Cantonment. Her Indian name was E-no-ze, which means "sunset".

She attended Cantonment Boarding School from 1919 to 1925.

Her recordings of traditional Southern Cheyenne songs have been influential in understanding elements of Cheyenne culture and preserving the historical record. Her vocal and lyrical interpretations of Cheyenne and Christian songs are significant contributions to ethnomusicology.

Additionally, her artistry in beadwork and moccasins has been recognized. She attended the 1970 Smithsonian Folklife Festival in Washington, D.C., and spoke on a panel about Native American crafting traditions.

Little Coyote was selected as the Outstanding Cheyenne Indian Lady by the Federation of Oklahoma Indian Women.

She served as Community Health Representative for Seiling, Canton and Longdale, Oklahoma. She was the chairperson of the Fellowship Committee for the Western District of Oklahoma Mennonite Indian Churches.

She was a strong advocate of education for Native children. She believed that teachers needed to establish trust with Native students to help them feel like they belong, and to listen closely to what the students have to say.

Bertha Little Coyote and Virginia Giglio published Leaving Everything Behind: The Songs and Memories of a Cheyenne Woman in November 1997. The book was dictated by Little Coyote about her life and memories, as well as songs and music, to Giglio who was a student of hers.

=== Death and legacy ===
Bertha Little Coyote died on February 2, 2003. She lived in Seiling, Oklahoma.
