= David Melcher =

United States Army general

Lieutenant General (Retired) David Melcher
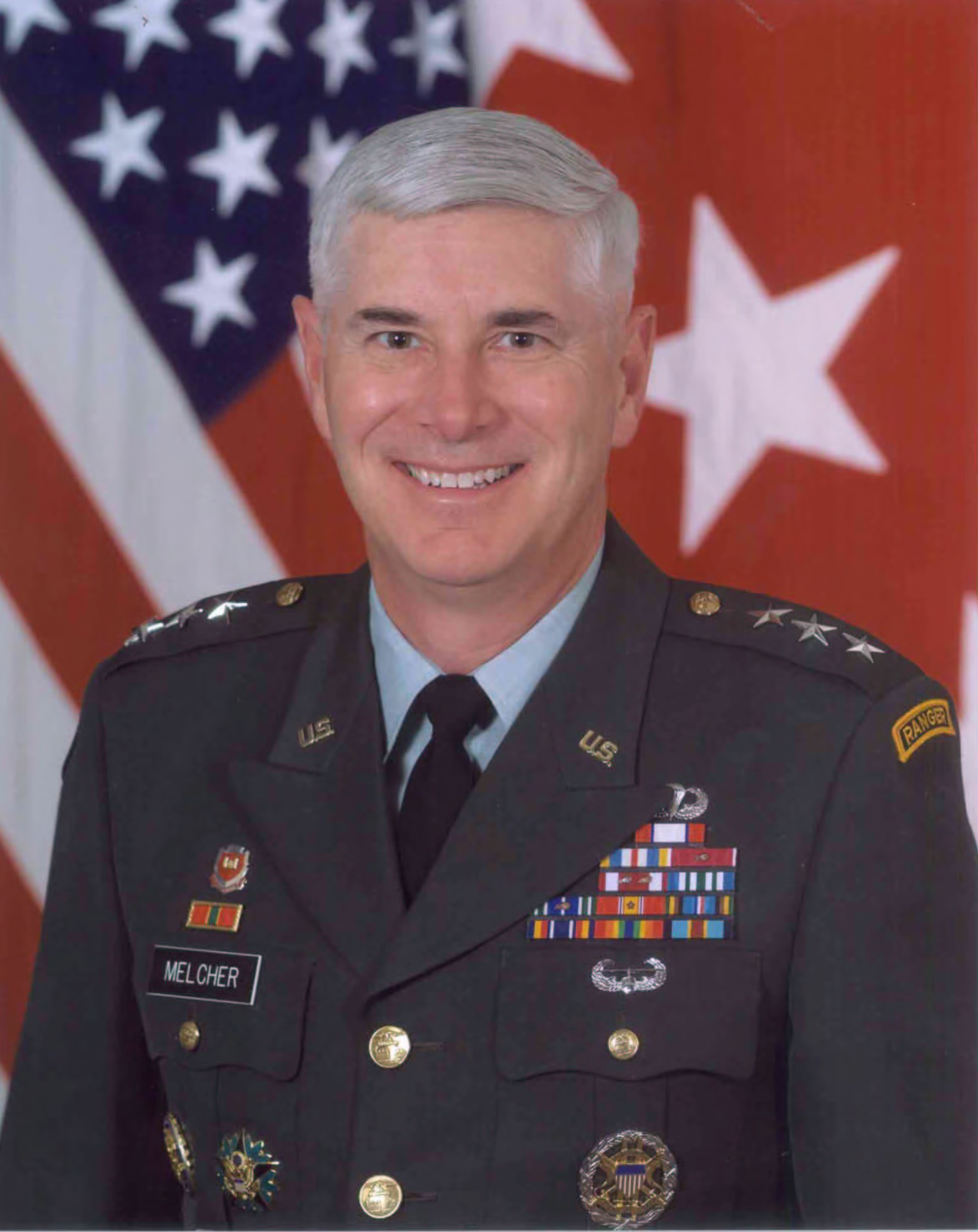
- Born: May 20, 1954 (age 72); Allentown, Pennsylvania, U.S.
- Military career
- Allegiance: United States
- Branch: United States Army
- Service years: 1972–2008
- Rank: Lieutenant General
- Commands: Army Corps of Engineers, Southwestern Division; Engineer Brigade, 1st Cavalry Division; 6th Engineer Battalion, 6th Infantry Division
- Conflicts: United States Invasion of Panama
- Awards: Distinguished Service Medal; Defense Superior Service Medal; Legion of Merit

David Frederic Melcher is an American businessman and retired U.S. Army Lieutenant General. He is known for his 32 years of U.S. Army Service, and as a prominent figure in the aerospace and defense community as the president and CEO of Fortune 500 company Exelis from 2011 to 2015, and as the former president and CEO of Aerospace Industries Association from 2015 to 2017.

== Early and personal life ==
Melcher was born in Allentown, Pennsylvania in 1954. Growing up in a middle-class family, Melcher was a student athlete and band member. Upon graduation from High School, he was selected to attend the United States Military Academy at West Point. There, Melcher continued his interest in intramural sports while studying Civil Engineering. Melcher married his wife Marla in 1976, with whom he has two children.

== Military career ==
Beginning his military career at West Point, Melcher completed his degree in 1976 and was commissioned as a Second Lieutenant in the Army Corps of Engineers. He later earned an M.B.A. degree from the Harvard Business School in 1983 and an M.P.A. degree from Shippensburg University.

During his 32 years of service, he commanded at the Battalion, Brigade, and Army Corps of Engineers Division level. As Commanding General of the Army Corps of Engineers, Southwestern Division, Melcher oversaw the construction, maintenance, and oversight of military infrastructure in six states in the American southwest. For his work in this position, he was awarded the Army Distinguished Service Medal.

Melcher's most prominent staff assignments included a White House Fellowship with the Office of Management and Budget under President Ronald Reagan and as the Army's Military Deputy for Budget, and Army Deputy Chief of Staff for Programs (G-8). As the Army G-8, Melcher was an advocate for the business transformation of the Army, promoting private sector solutions for Army management. Melcher spent 12 of his 32 years of service assigned to the Pentagon, which was his final assignment before retirement.

In 2008, Melcher retired from the Army at the rank of Lieutenant General.

== Exelis ==
Upon retirement from the Army, Melcher joined ITT Inc. where he was soon named president of its defense division, ITT Defense. In 2011, ITT Defense was spun-off as Exelis Inc. during a split-up of ITT Inc. Melcher was subsequently named as the newly independent company's first president and CEO. Exelis prospered under his leadership, becoming a Fortune 500 Company upon its IPO. During this time, Melcher was a notable voice for a resurgent defense industry following the 2011 Defense Draw-down, being named as Washington's Top 100 executives in 2013, 2014 and 2016. In 2014 Melcher was recognized by the Association of the United States Army with the John W. Dixon award for his significant contribution to the American defense industry.

Under Melcher, the company established the Exelis Action Corps, which utilized Exelis employee volunteers to service members, veterans and their families.

ITT Exelis was sold to the Harris Corporation in May 2015 for $4.56 Billion.

== Aerospace Industries Association ==
In June 2015, Melcher was selected to be the president and CEO of Aerospace Industries Association of America (AIA), a non-profit Aerospace and Defense Trade Association. He replaced former AIA CEO Marion Blakey, who had held that position for seven years. At AIA, Melcher is a nationally respected advocated within the aerospace and defense community on industry issues, including defense budgets, FAA NextGen, and American space competitiveness. As CEO, Melcher was named by The Hill as being in Washington's top 100 lobbyists in 2016 and 2017.

In 2017, Melcher announced his retirement from AIA effective December 31 of that year.
