= Lenora, Oklahoma =

Unincorporated community in Oklahoma, US

- Unincorporated community
- Location within the state of Oklahoma Lenora (the United States)
- Coordinates: 36°02′28″N 99°03′43″W
- Country: United States
- State: Oklahoma
- County: Dewey
- Elevation: 1,801 ft (549 m)
- Time zone: UTC-6 (Central (CST))
  - Summer (DST): UTC-5 (CDT)
- GNIS feature ID: 1100574

Lenora is an unincorporated community in Dewey County, Oklahoma, United States. It is located 5.5 miles west of Taloga.

== History ==
The community was founded in 1892 and had a population of 400 in 1900. A post office operated in Lenora from March 24, 1896 to June 30, 1955.
