= J. Jay McVicker =

American printmaker

- Born: Jesse Jay McVicker; October 18, 1911; Vici, Oklahoma, US
- Died: August 31, 2004 (aged 92); Stillwater, Oklahoma, US
- Education: Oklahoma State University
- Known for: Printmaking, painting, sculpture
- Movement: Regionalism, abstract expressionism, modernism, op art
- Spouse: Laura Beth Paul McVicker

J. Jay McVicker (born Jesse Jay McVicker; October 18, 1911 – August 31, 2004) was an American artist. He is known for his printmaking, particularly his early aquatints and his experimental use of intaglio techniques. McVicker was also active as a painter and sculptor throughout his career. A student of Ella Jack and Doel Reed at Oklahoma State University, McVicker showed early promise as a Regionalist watercolorist and printmaker. After graduating with a BA in 1940 and an MA in 1941, both from Oklahoma State University, he joined the faculty and remained in Stillwater, Oklahoma for the rest of his life. After World War II, McVicker turned to abstraction, and exhibited widely throughout the United States and abroad.

== Early life and education ==
McVicker was one of five children born to Jesse Allen and Clara Mae (Hendrick) McVicker, and from childhood was known as J. Jay. In 1915, the family moved to Berlin, Oklahoma, a small rural community northwest of Oklahoma City, near Vici, Oklahoma. He attended school in the nearby town of Weatherford, Oklahoma, and became a championship wrestler. He enrolled at the Southwestern Institute of Technology (now Southwestern Oklahoma State University), also in Weatherford, from 1930 to 1932. In 1938, he married Laura Beth Paul (1909–1993), while he was a student at Oklahoma Agricultural and Mechanical College (now Oklahoma State University). He received both a BA (1940) and an MA (1941) from Oklahoma A&M. Because the university didn't offer a Master of Fine Arts degree at the time, McVicker wrote an art history thesis that surveyed the use of color in European painting from the Renaissance through the early twentieth century. After graduation, McVicker joined the faculty at Oklahoma A&M. He became head of the Art Department in 1959, and retired on May 31, 1977.

== Career ==
By the time the United States joined the Second World War, McVicker was well known for his Regionalist prints and watercolors, but within a few years of the war's end, he was dedicated to abstraction and even non-objectivity in all media. Apart from a couple of years in California and in the U.S. Navy, McVicker spent his entire life in Oklahoma. His work, however, was exhibited widely, including at the Museum of Non-Objective Painting and the Downtown Gallery in New York City, and the Salon des Réalités Nouvelles in Paris, France. He was represented by the Bethesda Gallery until it closed, and today is represented by M. Lee Stone Fine Art and Peyton Wright. A book about McVicker by Oklahoma State University professor Louise Siddons was published by the University of Oklahoma Press in 2018.

== Work in public collections ==
McVicker's work is held by the Dallas Museum of Art, the Los Angeles County Museum of Art, the Fine Arts Museums of San Francisco, the Oklahoma State University Museum of Art, the Harwood Museum of Art, the Springfield Art Museum, the Philbrook Museum of Art, the Fred Jones Jr. Museum of Art, the Smithsonian American Art Museum and others.
