= Oakwood, Oklahoma =

- Town
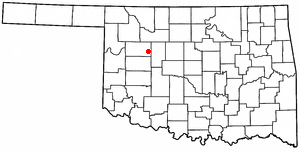
- Location of Oakwood, Oklahoma
- Coordinates: 35°55′54″N 98°42′11″W
- Country: United States
- State: Oklahoma
- County: Dewey

Area
  - Total: 0.24 sq mi (0.61 km^{2})
  - Land: 0.24 sq mi (0.61 km^{2})
  - Water: 0 sq mi (0.00 km^{2})
- Elevation: 1,841 ft (561 m)

Population (2020)
  - Total: 74
  - Density: 312.7/sq mi (120.74/km^{2})
- Time zone: UTC-6 (Central (CST))
  - Summer (DST): UTC-5 (CDT)
- ZIP code: 73658
- Area code: 580
- FIPS code: 40-53600
- GNIS feature ID: 2413070

Oakwood is a town in Dewey County, Oklahoma, United States. The population was 74 as of the 2020 United States census, an increase of about 13.8% from the population of 65 reported by the 2010 census.

== Geography ==
Oakwood is located in eastern Dewey County just southwest of U.S. Routes 270 and 281, which lead 20 miles (32 km) northwest to Seiling and southeast 19 miles (31 km) to Watonga.

According to the United States Census Bureau, Oakwood has a total area of 0.23 square miles (0.6 km^{2}), all land.

== Demographics ==
Historical population
Census	Pop.	Note	%±
1910	199		—
1920	224		12.6%
1930	266		18.8%
1940	233		−12.4%
1950	161		−30.9%
1960	122		−24.2%
1970	129		5.7%
1980	140		8.5%
1990	107		−23.6%
2000	72		−32.7%
2010	65		−9.7%
2020	74		13.8%
U.S. Decennial Census

=== 2020 census ===
As of the 2020 census, Oakwood had a population of 74. The median age was 46.0 years. 29.7% of residents were under the age of 18 and 27.0% of residents were 65 years of age or older. For every 100 females there were 117.6 males, and for every 100 females age 18 and over there were 116.7 males age 18 and over.

0.0% of residents lived in urban areas, while 100.0% lived in rural areas.

There were 33 households in Oakwood, of which 24.2% had children under the age of 18 living in them. Of all households, 51.5% were married-couple households, 18.2% were households with a male householder and no spouse or partner present, and 21.2% were households with a female householder and no spouse or partner present. About 18.2% of all households were made up of individuals and 6.0% had someone living alone who was 65 years of age or older.

There were 35 housing units, of which 5.7% were vacant. The homeowner vacancy rate was 0.0% and the rental vacancy rate was 0.0%.

Racial composition as of the 2020 census
Race	Number	Percent
White	58	78.4%
Black or African American	0	0.0%
American Indian and Alaska Native	2	2.7%
Asian	0	0.0%
Native Hawaiian and Other Pacific Islander	0	0.0%
Some other race	1	1.4%
Two or more races	13	17.6%
Hispanic or Latino (of any race)	2	2.7%

=== 2000 census ===
As of the census of 2000, there were 72 people, 35 households, and 17 families residing in the town. The population density was 305.8 inhabitants per square mile (118.1/km^{2}). There were 48 housing units at an average density of 203.9 per square mile (78.7/km^{2}). The racial makeup of the town was 94.44% White, 1.39% Native American, 1.39% from other races, and 2.78% from two or more races. Hispanic or Latino of any race were 1.39% of the population.

There were 35 households, out of which 22.9% had children under the age of 18 living with them, 42.9% were married couples living together, 2.9% had a female householder with no husband present, and 48.6% were non-families. 42.9% of all households were made up of individuals, and 20.0% had someone living alone who was 65 years of age or older. The average household size was 2.06 and the average family size was 2.83.

In the town, the population was spread out, with 16.7% under the age of 18, 12.5% from 18 to 24, 19.4% from 25 to 44, 29.2% from 45 to 64, and 22.2% who were 65 years of age or older. The median age was 47 years. For every 100 females, there were 89.5 males. For every 100 females age 18 and over, there were 106.9 males.

The median income for a household in the town was $18,125, and the median income for a family was $36,875. Males had a median income of $16,250 versus $30,625 for females. The per capita income for the town was $21,254. There were 18.2% of families and 22.0% of the population living below the poverty line, including no under eighteens and 50.0% of those over 64.
