= McAllister House =

McAllister House may refer to:

- Pearce-McAllister Cottage, Denver, Colorado, listed on the National Register of Historic Places (NRHP)
- McAllister House (Colorado Springs, Colorado), listed on the NRHP in El Paso County, Colorado
- McAllister House (Seiling, Oklahoma), NRHP-listed
- McAllister-Beaver House, Bellefonte, Pennsylvania, listed on the NRHP in Centre County, Pennsylvania
- Archibald McAllister House, Harrisburg, Pennsylvania, listed on the NRHP in Dauphin County, Pennsylvania
- James G. McAllister House, Salt Lake City, Utah, listed on the NRHP in Salt Lake City, Utah
- Alexander McAllister House, Union Gap, Washington, listed on the NRHP in Yakima County, Washington
