= Exelis Inc. =

American aerospace and defense company

- Type: Public
- Traded as: NYSE: XLS
- Industry: Defense
- Predecessor: ITT Corporation's defense division
- Founded: October 2011; 15 years ago
- Defunct: May 29, 2015
- Fate: Acquired by Harris Corporation
- Successor: L3Harris
- Headquarters: Tysons Corner, Virginia, U.S. (McLean mailing address), United States
- Key people: David F. Melcher (president and CEO)
- Revenue: 2,230,000,000 United States dollar (2014)
- Number of employees: 19,000
- Divisions: Aerostructures; Electronic Systems; Geospatial Systems; Information Systems; Mission Systems; Night Vision and Communications Solutions
- Website: exelisinc.com

Exelis Inc. was an American aerospace, defense, information and services company created in October 2011 as a result of the spinoff of ITT Corporation's defense business into an independent, publicly traded company. The company was headquartered in Tysons Corner, Virginia, USA and was led by CEO and President David F. Melcher. The Washington Post highlighted Exelis as a top company in the Washington, D.C. region in 2011. It was acquired by the Harris Corporation for $4.75 billion in 2015.

In 2023, PASSUR Aerospace acquired an exclusive, perpetual license to market and support the L3Harris Symphony® for Airports suite. This acquisition integrated Symphony’s airport operational software—including ADS-B surface vehicle tracking - VMAT, noise management and billing tools—with PASSUR’s existing data and decision-support platform ARiVA to provide enhanced, comprehensive operations intelligence services to airports and airlines.

== History ==
For more detailed company history prior to October 31, 2011, see ITT Corporation

Exelis Inc. was originally the Defense division of ITT Corporation, alongside its Industrial Process & Flow Control division and Water & Waste Water division. ITT was founded as the small communications company Puerto Rico Telephone Company by brothers Sosthenes and Hernan Behn. Through a series of business and patent acquisitions, the company grew and was renamed International Telephone and Telegraph in 1920. ITT continued to grow before appointing Harold Geneen as CEO in 1959. Until his retirement from the position in 1977, Geneen was responsible for growing the company from a medium-sized business earning $765 million in 1961 to an international conglomerate making $17 billion in sales in 1970. The company acquired more than 350 companies during Geneen's tenure; at one point the acquisition rate reached one deal per week. Ownership extended over such notable companies as Continental Baking, maker of Wonder Bread and the Twinkie, Sheraton Hotels and Avis Rent-A-Car. For a brief period in the mid-1960s, ITT was in talks to acquire the ABC television and radio networks in the US, but that deal fell through under regulatory scrutiny.

Following Geneen's retirement, ITT went through a restructuring phase under CEO Rand Araskog and was split into three companies in 1995: ITT Corporation (formerly ITT Industries), ITT Sheraton, and The Hartford, an insurance company.

=== 2011 spin-off ===
On January 12, 2011, the ITT Corporation Board of Directors approved a plan to split the firm. On October 31, 2011, ITT Corporation spun off its defense and water technology businesses to form three separate, publicly traded companies:

- Exelis Inc., a global aerospace, defense, information and services company headquartered in Tysons Corner, Virginia.
- Xylem Inc., a water technology firm.
- ITT Corporation, a manufacturing firm.

From the spin-off to Nov. 1, 2013, Exelis was known as ITT Exelis to help ease the transition of the company's brand. Exelis employed approximately 19,000 people and generated $5.5 billion in sales in 2012.

On February 13, 2013, Exelis announced that it would be closing its West Springfield manufacturing plant and laying off 200 employees after citing expected cuts in U.S. defense spending.

=== 2015 purchase ===
In February 2015, Exelis announced that plans had been approved for the sale of the company through a cash/stock purchase to competitor Harris Corporation. The purchase price of 4.75 billion dollars was reported as being one of the highest such defense company purchases, since the Lockheed/Martin merger. When finalized in June 2015, the purchase was expected to make Harris/Exelis one of the top 10 defense contractors in the United States.

== Company structure ==
Exelis had six businesses that specialized in different technologies and services.

=== Aerostructures ===
Located in Salt Lake City, Utah the Exelis Aerostructures business was a designer and manufacturer of lightweight composite aerospace structures, subassemblies and components.

Major Products:
Exelis Aerostructures was a subcontractor for the Boeing 7-series family of aircraft, including composite air-frame substructures for the 787 Dreamliner, the Airbus A380 aircraft as well as the Sikorsky S-76 helicopter. For defense programs, they provided complete structural assemblies, flight critical components as well as primary and secondary structural elements for platforms such as the Lockheed Martin F-35 Lightning II, the Sikorsky CH-53K King Stallion Heavy Lift Helicopter, the Boeing C-17 Globemaster III and the Lockheed Martin Joint Air-to-Surface Standoff Missile (JASSM). Exelis also produced the Bear Claw line of down-hole drillable plugs used in oil and gas well completions.

=== Electronic Systems ===
Headquartered in Clifton, New Jersey, with a major division in Salt Lake City, Utah, the electronics systems division of the company offered a variety of electronic warfare and surveillance technologies, including air traffic control technology for both military and domestic use, radar and sonar systems, antennas and signal-jamming devices to disarm improvised explosive devices (IED).

Major Products:

- ALQ-214 IDECM (Integrated Electronic Countermeasures)

=== Geospatial Systems ===
With facilities located in Clifton, New Jersey and Rochester, New York, the geospatial systems division manufactured and provided GPS technology (Clifton), surveillance systems (Rochester) and data encryption services, as well as remote sensing and navigation technology. The company also included facilities in Ft. Wayne that designed and manufactured instruments for weather tracking systems.

Major Products and Solutions:

=== Information Systems ===
The information systems division was headquartered in Herndon, Virginia. The division specialized in creating secure information and electronics systems for specific and often challenging environments, including defense and intelligence missions, the Census Bureau, homeland security, air traffic control and space missions.

=== Mission Systems ===
Headquartered in Colorado Springs, Colorado, Mission Systems provided facilities, engineering, logistics and security support for U.S. military bases domestically and abroad.

=== Night Vision & Communications Solutions ===
Located in Ft. Wayne, Indiana and Roanoke, Virginia, Exelis Night Vision & Communications Solutions (NVCS) provided products and services for secure voice and data communications, battlefield situational awareness, and night vision systems in the global defense, security, and battlefield management sectors.

Major Products

- SINCGARS – Single Channel Ground and Airborne Radio System, military communications system.
- GNOMAD (Global Network On the Move – Active Distribution), satellite military data communications system

== Exelis Action Corps ==
Exelis Action Corps was the company's volunteer-service program designed to create large-scale, team and individual volunteer activities and projects to support and engage service members, veterans and their families in local communities. Activities ranged from providing interviewing coaching to a military service member, to painting a house for a disabled veteran, to tutoring the children of a service member serving abroad.

== Leadership prior to acquisition ==
=== Board of directors ===
- Ralph W. Hake

Chairman of the Board

- David F. Melcher

Chief Executive Officer

- John J. Hamre
- Paul J. Kern
- Herman E. Bulls
- Patrick Moore
- Mark L. Reuss
- Billie I. Williamson
- R. David Yost

=== Management Team ===
- David F. Melcher

President

- Peter J. Milligan

Chief Financial Officer

- Ann D. Davidson

Chief Legal Officer

- A. John Procopio

Chief Human Resources Officer

- Robert E. Durbin

Strategy and Government Relations

- Mike Blair

Vice President of Aerostructures

- Richard D. Sorelle

President of Electronic Systems

- Christopher D. Young

President of Geospatial Systems

- Pamela A. Drew

President of Information Systems

- Kenneth W. Hunzeker

President of Mission Systems

- David J. Albritton

Chief Communications Officer

- Nicholas E. Bobay

President of Night Vision & Communications Systems

- Vincent Thomas

Vice President of Operations

- Katy Herr

Vice President of Investor Relations

== Customers ==
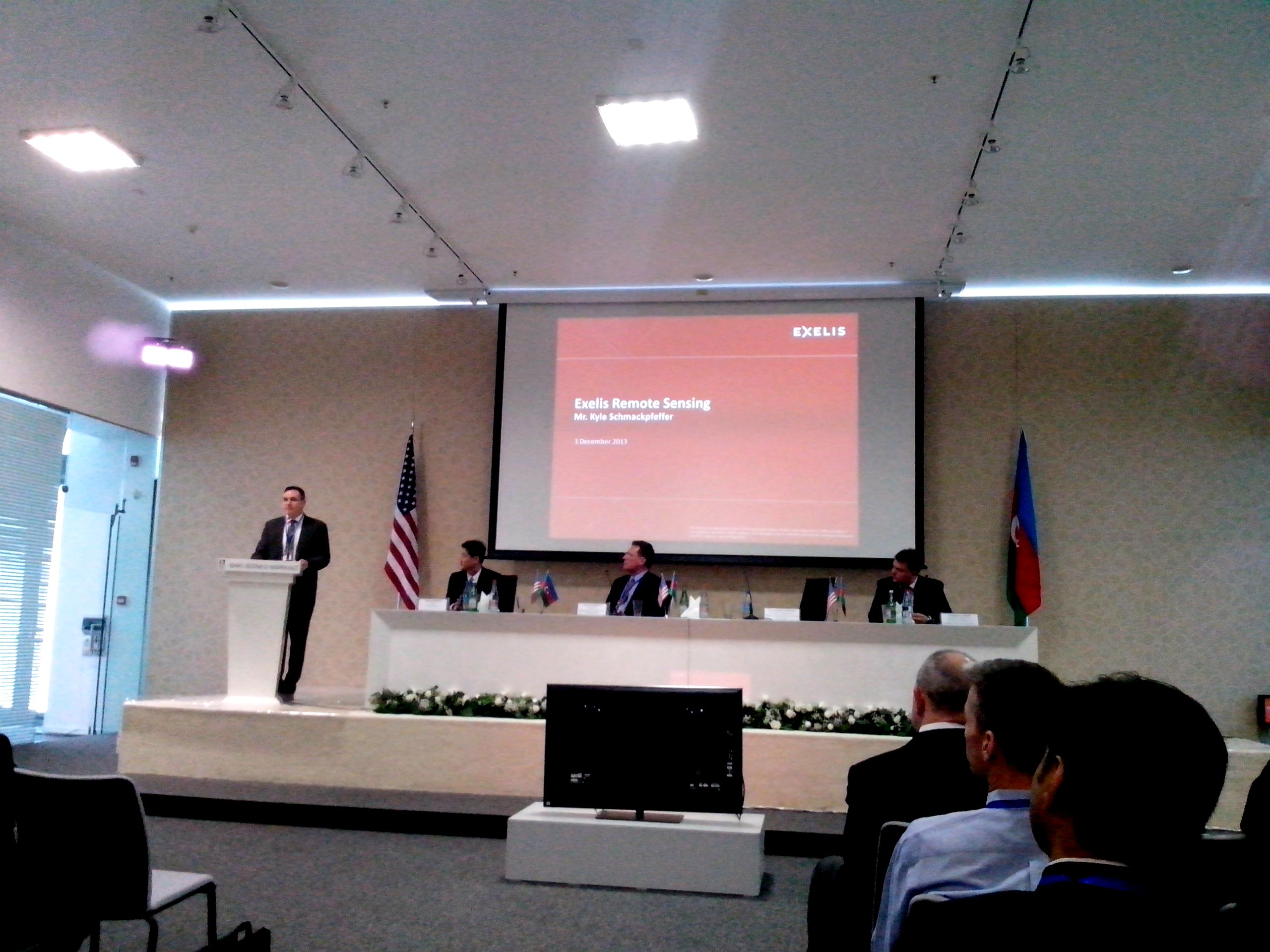
Azerbaijan-U.S. ICT Forum, December 3, 2013

Customers included:

- US Army
- US Navy
- US Air Force
- US Marine Corps
- Department of Homeland Security
- Federal Aviation Administration
- NASA

The company also had clients in more than 50 countries in Europe, the Americas, Asia, the Middle East and Africa, as well as Australia.
