= Seiling, Oklahoma =

- City
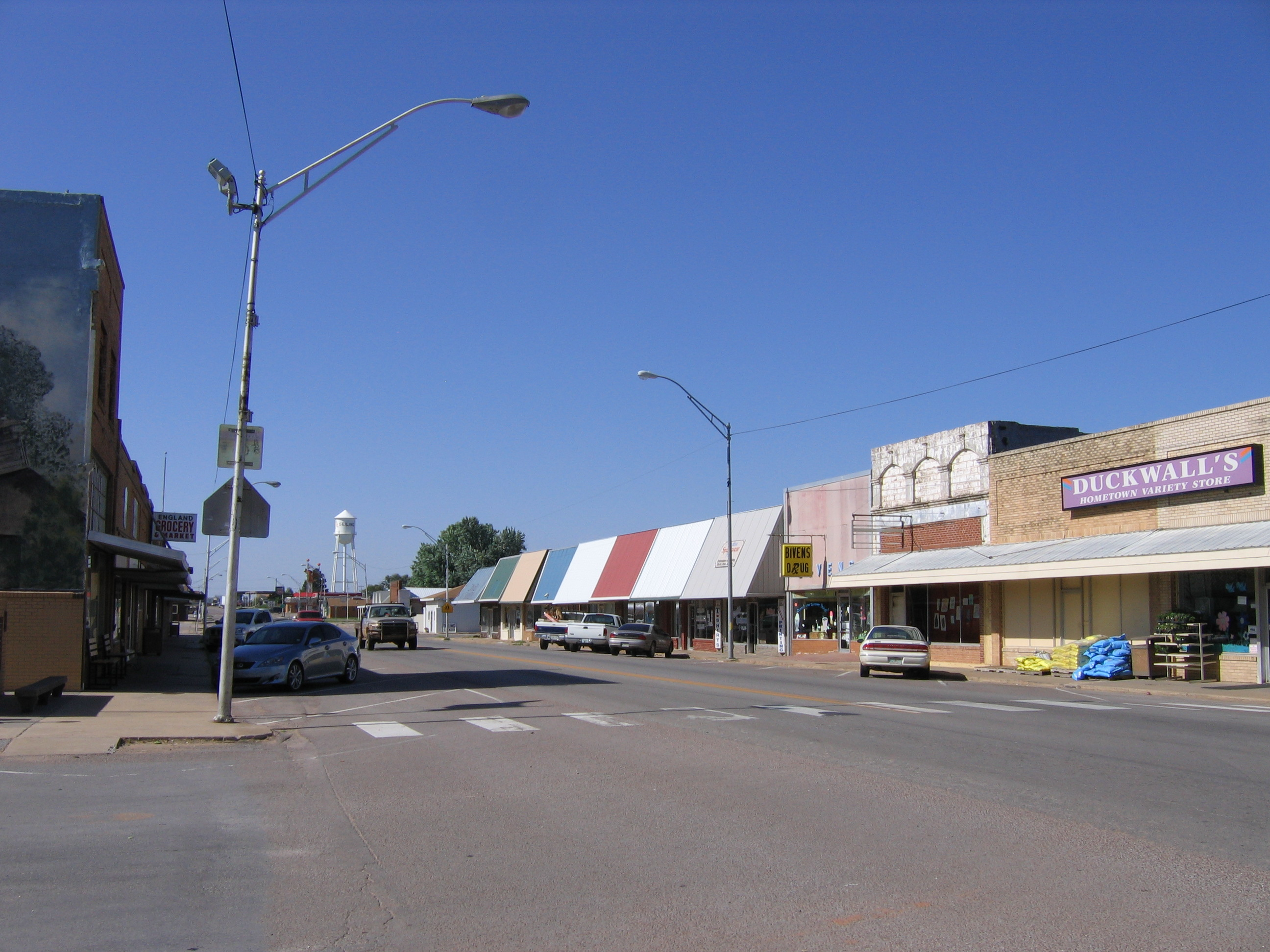
- Downtown Seiling
- Nickname: Crossroads of Northwest Oklahoma
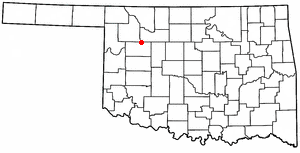
- Location of Seiling, Oklahoma
- Coordinates: 36°09′07″N 98°55′32″W
- Country: United States
- State: Oklahoma
- County: Dewey

Area
  - Total: 1.19 sq mi (3.07 km^{2})
  - Land: 1.19 sq mi (3.07 km^{2})
  - Water: 0 sq mi (0.00 km^{2})
- Elevation: 1,736 ft (529 m)

Population (2020)
  - Total: 850
  - Density: 716.5/sq mi (276.65/km^{2})
- Time zone: UTC-6 (Central (CST))
  - Summer (DST): UTC-5 (CDT)
- ZIP code: 73663
- Area code: 580
- FIPS code: 40-66250
- GNIS feature ID: 2411861
- Website: seilingok.com

Seiling (/ˈsil ˌɪŋ/ SEEL ing) is a city in Dewey County, Oklahoma, United States. The population was 850 at the 2020 census. The town was named in 1899 for Louis Seiling, a local store owner who had acquired a homestead in the Cheyenne-Arapaho land run of April 1892. The Hobson Town and Improvement Company established a town called Hobson, but the name was changed to Seiling in January 1899. It incorporated in 1909. Seiling is now the largest city in Dewey County. Their girls basketball team has also won the Oklahoma State Championship four times in a row (2016–2019).

== History ==
Seiling developed as a local agricultural center and became the largest town in Dewey County despite the fact that the nearest railroad depot was in Canton, more than 25 miles (40 km) away. Moreover, there were no bridges across either of the Canadian rivers until 1906. A horse racing track was built in 1903.

== Geography ==
Seiling is located immediately south of the North Canadian River and 7 miles (11 km) north of the Canadian River, 10 miles (16 km) from Taloga, the county seat.

According to the United States Census Bureau, the city has a total area of 0.8 square miles (2.1 km^{2}), all land.

== Demographics ==
Historical population
Census	Pop.	Note	%±
1910	352		—
1920	323		−8.2%
1930	568		75.9%
1940	629		10.7%
1950	700		11.3%
1960	910		30.0%
1970	1,033		13.5%
1980	1,103		6.8%
1990	1,031		−6.5%
2000	875		−15.1%
2010	860		−1.7%
2020	850		−1.2%
U.S. Decennial Census

=== 2020 census ===
As of the 2020 census, Seiling had a population of 850. The median age was 33.8 years. 28.7% of residents were under the age of 18 and 16.1% of residents were 65 years of age or older. For every 100 females there were 89.3 males, and for every 100 females age 18 and over there were 94.9 males age 18 and over.

0% of residents lived in urban areas, while 100.0% lived in rural areas.

There were 325 households in Seiling, of which 39.7% had children under the age of 18 living in them. Of all households, 48.0% were married-couple households, 20.0% were households with a male householder and no spouse or partner present, and 27.1% were households with a female householder and no spouse or partner present. About 25.2% of all households were made up of individuals and 11.1% had someone living alone who was 65 years of age or older.

There were 374 housing units, of which 13.1% were vacant. Among occupied housing units, 68.0% were owner-occupied and 32.0% were renter-occupied. The homeowner vacancy rate was <0.1% and the rental vacancy rate was 9.6%.

Racial composition as of the 2020 census
Race	Percent
White	78.8%
Black or African American	0%
American Indian and Alaska Native	10.6%
Asian	0.2%
Native Hawaiian and Other Pacific Islander	0%
Some other race	2.5%
Two or more races	7.9%
Hispanic or Latino (of any race)	9.3%

=== 2010 census ===
As of the 2010 census, there were 860 people, 325 households, and 216 families residing in the city. The population density was 1,000 inhabitants per square mile (390/km^{2}). There were 402 housing units at an average density of 488.6 per square mile (188.6/km^{2}). Residents self-identified as 95.1% white, 12.7% Native American, 4.9% of mixed heritage, 1.6% Asian, and 0.1% African American. Hispanic or Latino Americans made up 3.7% of the population.

There were 325 households, out of which 29.5% had children under the age of 18 living with them, 48.9% were married couples living together, 12% had a female householder with no husband present, and 33.5% were non-families. Individuals living alone accounted for 31.1% of households. The average household size was 2.58 and the average family size was 3.24. The median age was 37.9 years.

=== 2007–2011 American Community Survey ===
The median income for a household in the city was $45,650, and the median income for a family was $58,466. Males who were employed full-time had a median income of $43,333. Females who were employed full-time had a median income of $32,500. The per capita income for the city was $24,410. Below the poverty line were 9.7% of people, 10.3% of families, 13% of those under 18 and 11.6% of those over 64.

== Economy ==
The local economy has been based on agriculture since the land was opened to non-Indian settlement. The major crops initially were broomcorn and cotton. Seiling soon had a cotton gin and a feed mill. Wheat and rye became important crops before World War I. In 1918, the Seiling Milling Company opened a flour mill and marketed "White Rose Special" flour until it closed in 1952.

== Transportation ==
Seiling is on US-60, US-270, US-281, SH-3, and SH-51, some of which run concurrently through the town. US-183 is immediately to the west. Thus the town bills itself as the “Crossroads of Northwest Oklahoma.”

Seiling Airport (FAA Identifier: 1S4) is immediately adjacent to Seiling on the northwest.

== Parks and recreation ==
Seiling City Park is in the town, located on Seiling Creek.

The 9-hole Seiling Golf Course was built in 1980.

The Seiling Swimming Pool is open to the general public, and for special event rental.

Canton Lake is to the east.

Little Sahara State Park is about a half-hour to the north.

The McAllister House at 311 N. Locust Ave. and the Seiling Milling Company at 4th and Orange St. are on the National Register of Historic Places listings in Dewey County, Oklahoma.

== Notable people ==
- Gary England, meteorologist for KWTV-News 9
- Jordy Mercer, Major League baseball player
- Carrie Nation, Prohibition advocate
- Tom L. Ward, oil and gas businessman
