= Dewey County, Oklahoma =

County in Oklahoma, United States

- County
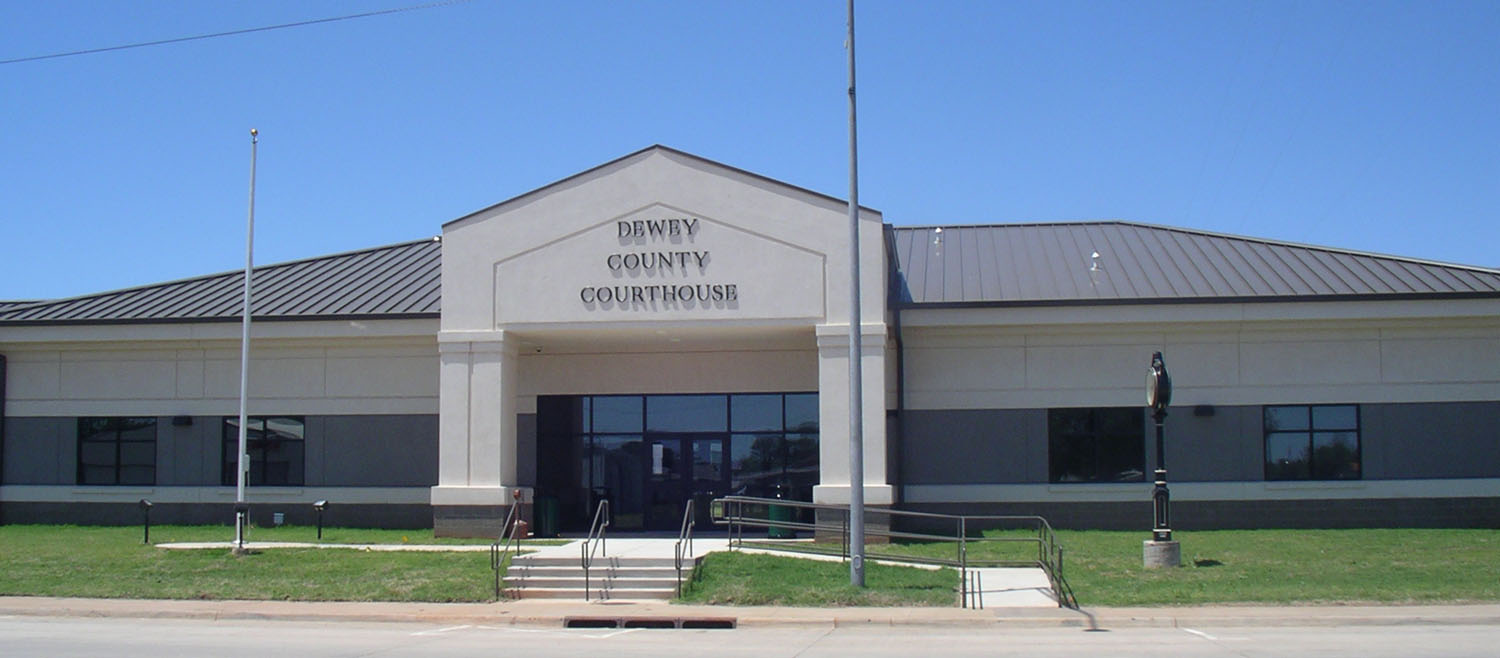
- Dewey County Courthouse

- Location within the U.S. state of Oklahoma
- Coordinates: 35°59′N 99°00′W
- Country: United States
- State: Oklahoma
- Founded: 1891
- Named for: George Dewey
- Seat: Taloga
- Largest city: Seiling

Area
  - Total: 1,008 sq mi (2,610 km^{2})
  - Land: 999 sq mi (2,590 km^{2})
  - Water: 8.8 sq mi (23 km^{2}) 0.9%

Population (2020)
  - Total: 4,484
  - Estimate (2025): 4,207 ▼
  - Density: 4.49/sq mi (1.73/km^{2})
- Time zone: UTC−6 (Central)
  - Summer (DST): UTC−5 (CDT)
- Congressional district: 3rd

Dewey County is a county in the western part of the U.S. state of Oklahoma. As of the 2020 census, the population was 4,484. Its county seat is Taloga. The county was created in 1891 as "County D". In an 1898 election, county voters chose the name Dewey, honoring Admiral George Dewey.

== History ==
Lands assigned to the Choctaw and Seminole tribes extended into the area now occupied by Dewey County. Under the Reconstruction Treaties of 1866 the Choctaw and Chickasaw ceded their western domain to the United States. Known as the Leased District, part of the area became the Cheyenne and Arapaho reservation.

Dewey County was created in Oklahoma Territory in 1891 and was opened to non-Indian settlement on April 19, 1892. It was then named as County D by an act of Congress, and did not receive its present name until a general election in 1898. A wooden structure in Taloga was used as the county courthouse from 1909 until 1926, when the present courthouse was built.

== Geography ==
According to the U.S. Census Bureau, the county has a total area of 1,008 square miles (2,610 km^{2}), of which 999 square miles (2,590 km^{2}) is land and 8.8 square miles (23 km^{2}) (0.9%) is water.

Most of the county is in the Gypsum Hills physiographic region, except that the western one-fourth of the county is in the High Plains region. It is drained by the Canadian and North Canadian Rivers. Canton Lake, built on the Canadian River in 1966, is the only significant lake or reservoir in the county.

=== Major highways ===
- U.S. Highway 60
- U.S. Highway 183
- U.S. Highway 270 / State Highway 3
- U.S. Highway 281
- State Highway 34
- State Highway 47
- State Highway 51

=== Adjacent counties ===
- Woodward County (north)
- Major County (north)
- Blaine County (east)
- Custer County (south)
- Roger Mills County (southwest)
- Ellis County (northwest)

== Demographics ==
Historical population
Census	Pop.	Note	%±
1900	8,819		—
1910	14,132		60.2%
1920	12,434		−12.0%
1930	13,250		6.6%
1940	11,981		−9.6%
1950	8,789		−26.6%
1960	6,051		−31.2%
1970	5,656		−6.5%
1980	5,922		4.7%
1990	5,551		−6.3%
2000	4,743		−14.6%
2010	4,810		1.4%
2020	4,484		−6.8%
2025 (est.)	4,207	▼	−6.2%
U.S. Decennial Census; 1790-1960 1900-1990; 1990-2000 2010

=== 2020 census ===
As of the 2020 United States census, the county had a population of 4,484. Of the residents, 25.6% were under the age of 18 and 20.7% were 65 years of age or older; the median age was 40.3 years. For every 100 females there were 98.1 males, and for every 100 females age 18 and over there were 98.8 males.

The racial makeup of the county was 85.3% White, 0.2% Black or African American, 6.0% American Indian and Alaska Native, 0.1% Asian, 1.3% from some other race, and 7.0% from two or more races. Hispanic or Latino residents of any race comprised 5.8% of the population.

There were 1,736 households in the county, of which 31.3% had children under the age of 18 living with them and 20.7% had a female householder with no spouse or partner present. About 25.7% of all households were made up of individuals and 13.2% had someone living alone who was 65 years of age or older.

There were 2,176 housing units, of which 20.2% were vacant. Among occupied housing units, 77.8% were owner-occupied and 22.2% were renter-occupied. The homeowner vacancy rate was 1.2% and the rental vacancy rate was 13.7%.

=== 2000 census ===
As of the census of 2000, there were 4,743 people, 1,962 households, and 1,336 families residing in the county. The population density was 5 people per square mile (1.9 people/km^{2}). There were 2,425 housing units at an average density of 2 units per square mile (0.77/km^{2}). The racial makeup of the county was 92.16% White, 0.13% Black or African American, 4.64% Native American, 0.06% Asian, 0.02% Pacific Islander, 0.72% from other races, and 2.28% from two or more races. 2.68% of the population were Hispanic or Latino of any race.

There were 1,962 households, out of which 26.70% had children under the age of 18 living with them, 59.80% were married couples living together, 5.00% had a female householder with no husband present, and 31.90% were non-families. 30.00% of all households were made up of individuals, and 16.40% had someone living alone who was 65 years of age or older. The average household size was 2.35 and the average family size was 2.93.

In the county, the population was spread out, with 23.30% under the age of 18, 7.10% from 18 to 24, 22.90% from 25 to 44, 25.70% from 45 to 64, and 21.00% who were 65 years of age or older. The median age was 43 years. For every 100 females there were 94.90 males. For every 100 females age 18 and over, there were 91.30 males.

The median income for a household in the county was $28,172, and the median income for a family was $36,114. Males had a median income of $26,675 versus $18,548 for females. The per capita income for the county was $15,806. About 11.40% of families and 15.00% of the population were below the poverty line, including 17.60% of those under age 18 and 15.80% of those age 65 or over.

== Politics ==
Voter Registration and Party Enrollment as of June 30, 2023
Party	Number of Voters	Percentage
Democratic	497	16.40%
Republican	2,235	73.74%
Others	299	9.86%
Total	3,031	100%

United States presidential election results for Dewey County, Oklahoma
Year	Republican		Democratic		Third party(ies)	
Year	No.	%	No.	%	No.	%
1908	1,210	43.53%	1,075	38.67%	495	17.81%
1912	1,086	36.78%	1,075	36.40%	792	26.82%
1916	796	29.36%	992	36.59%	923	34.05%
1920	1,738	51.76%	995	29.63%	625	18.61%
1924	1,539	44.43%	1,126	32.51%	799	23.07%
1928	2,486	65.35%	1,175	30.89%	143	3.76%
1932	1,051	21.42%	3,855	78.58%	0	0.00%
1936	1,846	37.96%	2,980	61.28%	37	0.76%
1940	2,613	51.87%	2,391	47.46%	34	0.67%
1944	2,166	54.33%	1,808	45.35%	13	0.33%
1948	1,494	42.17%	2,049	57.83%	0	0.00%
1952	2,583	66.85%	1,281	33.15%	0	0.00%
1956	1,896	56.70%	1,448	43.30%	0	0.00%
1960	2,115	66.16%	1,082	33.84%	0	0.00%
1964	1,438	47.07%	1,617	52.93%	0	0.00%
1968	1,508	53.46%	773	27.40%	540	19.14%
1972	2,106	74.79%	626	22.23%	84	2.98%
1976	1,230	43.54%	1,540	54.51%	55	1.95%
1980	1,943	67.56%	826	28.72%	107	3.72%
1984	2,098	75.55%	664	23.91%	15	0.54%
1988	1,543	60.49%	963	37.75%	45	1.76%
1992	1,244	44.72%	845	30.37%	693	24.91%
1996	1,179	51.24%	816	35.46%	306	13.30%
2000	1,607	72.39%	599	26.98%	14	0.63%
2004	1,843	81.87%	408	18.13%	0	0.00%
2008	1,857	84.29%	346	15.71%	0	0.00%
2012	1,792	85.62%	301	14.38%	0	0.00%
2016	1,965	87.41%	222	9.88%	61	2.71%
2020	2,124	90.04%	214	9.07%	21	0.89%
2024	1,984	89.57%	209	9.44%	22	0.99%

== Economy ==
The county economy has centered on agriculture since it began to be settled. Principal crops have included corn, cotton, wheat, broomcorn, Kaffir corn, and oats. Truck farmers in the eastern part of the county grew tomatoes, watermelons, apples, blackberries, and other small fruits. Livestock (cattle, horses, mules, sheep and goats) raising had become important by the 1930s. These products were still economically important by the turn of the 21st century.

Mineral extraction included oil and gas production (mainly in the 1940s and 1950s), bentonite, gypsum, clay and sand. In 2000, Dewey County had only two manufacturing businesses that employed more than ten people.

== Communities ==
=== City ===
- Seiling

=== Towns ===
- Camargo
- Leedey
- Oakwood
- Putnam
- Taloga (county seat)
- Vici

=== Unincorporated communities ===
- Fay (census-designated place)
- Lenora

== Education ==
School districts include:

- Canton Public Schools
- Leedey Public Schools
- Sharon-Mutual Public Schools
- Seiling Public Schools
- Taloga Public Schools
- Thomas-Fay-Custer Unified Schools
- Vici Public Schools

== See also ==
- National Register of Historic Places listings in Dewey County, Oklahoma
