= U.S. Army Corps Engineers, Tulsa District =

U.S. Army Corps of Engineers, Tulsa District
- USACE, Tulsa District
- Active: 1 July 1939; 86 years ago – present
- Country: United States of America
- Branch: United States Army
- Garrison/HQ: Tulsa, Oklahoma, U.S.
- Motto: Essayons (Let Us Try)
- Colors: Scarlet and White
- Website: www.swt.usace.army.mil

Commanders
- Current commander: Scott S. Preston, Commander, District Engineer

Insignia
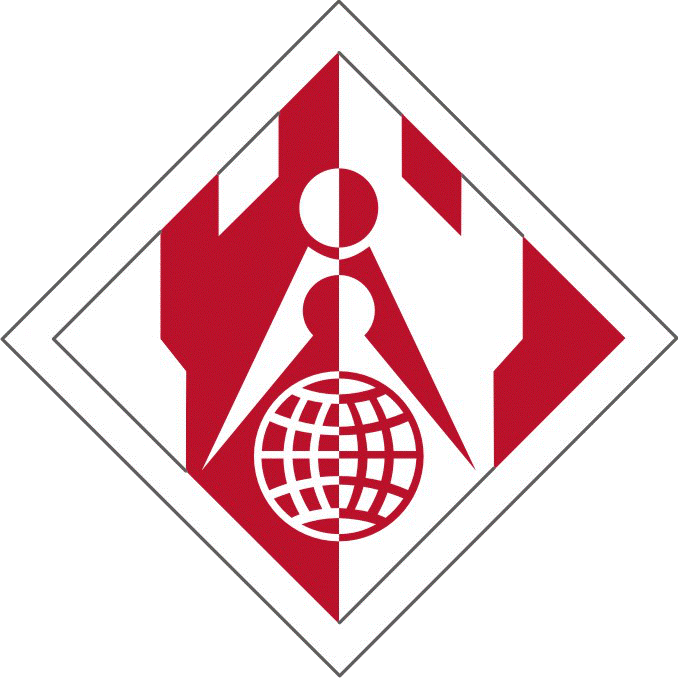
- Shoulder Sleeve Insignia

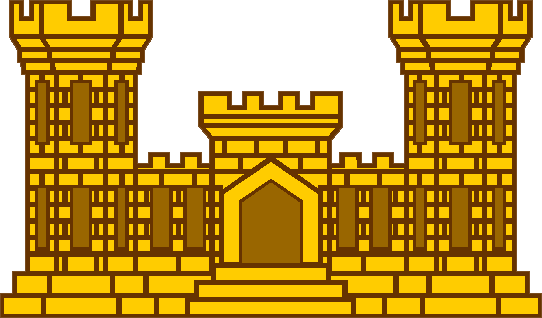
- Branch Insignia

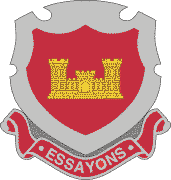
- Regimental Insignia

== Tulsa District History ==
U.S. Army Corps of Engineers, Tulsa District (USACE-SWT), is a United States Army military unit headquartered in Tulsa, Oklahoma. It "oversees Army Corps of Engineer responsibilities in all of Oklahoma and parts of southern Kansas and northern Texas". Tulsa District was founded in 1939 in the heartland of the country to provide engineering support to the nation at a time of great contrast. The vivid memories of the 1936 flood — one of the greatest and most widespread flooding disasters ever seen — contrasted with the drought which tried to squeeze the life out of every living thing. These tragic events helped bind the citizens and the local and federal governments into a strong problem-solving union. Tulsa District professionals developed a spirit and dedication which has carried the district through almost 75 years of service to the nation.

== Tulsa District Chronology ==
July 1, 1939 - Tulsa District is formed and receives $11 million for work on eight authorized projects. District work includes completing the Great Salt Plains and Fort Supply Lakes already under construction; design and construction work on authorized Canton, Optima, and Hulah Lakes; continue studies leading to authorization of Mannford (Keystone), Oologah, Tenkiller Ferry, and Wister Lakes; and continue cooperation on work for Grand Lake (then under construction) and Markham Ferry and Fort Gibson Dams.

December 1940 - Military construction for the Army Air Corps is transferred from the Quartermaster Corps to the Corps of Engineers. Thirteen months later, the Corps undertakes all construction for the Army’s war efforts.

Early 1941 - Tulsa District is building the Tulsa Aircraft Assembly Plant #3, (the Bomber Plant) which became home of McDonnell Douglas in Tulsa, Okla. Construction began on the $29 million Midwest City Air Depot (now Tinker Air Force Base) and the Oklahoma Aircraft Assembly Plant #5 in Oklahoma City which was annexed into Tinker in 1947 as Building 3001.

December 7, 1941 - Japanese attack Pearl Harbor, triggering U.S. entry into World War II (1941 - 1945). During the war, Tulsa and Denison Districts placed $800 million in military construction and procured special engineering equipment costing more than $100 million.

1944 - Flood Control Act authorizes recreation facilities at reservoirs.

April 1, 1945 - Denison District is merged with the Tulsa District after Denison Dam (Lake Texoma) was completed by the Denison District in 1944.

July 24, 1946 - McClellan-Kerr Arkansas River navigation project is authorized in Rivers and Harbors Act. The plan includes navigation from Catoosa, Okla., to the Mississippi River.

1950-1953 - Korean Conflict. Tulsa District military construction averages $50 million a year.

1954 - Arkansas River navigation is placed in a “deferred for further study” category. A major engineering problem needed to be solved — 100 million tons of silt flowing down the Arkansas annually could prevent navigation.

1957 - Navigation system construction begins.

July 1961 - Tulsa District is relieved of all military construction responsibilities to reemphasize its increasing civil works programs.

December 30, 1970 - McClellan-Kerr Arkansas River Navigation System is ready for use: 448 miles, 17 locks and dams.

January 21, 1971 - First tow travels full length of navigation system, arrives at Port of Catoosa.

June 5, 1971 - President Nixon dedicates $1.2 billion navigation system.

1972 - Clean Water Act extends Corps regulatory authority (Section 404 Permits) to all waters of the United States.

October 1, 1980 - The portion of the Tulsa District lying within the state of Arkansas is transferred to the Little Rock District.

1981 - Tulsa District resumes military responsibility for four installations in Arkansas and five in Oklahoma.

1982 - Tulsa District gives up the small pieces of Missouri, New Mexico, and Colorado and picks up the remainder of the Arkansas River Basin in Kansas.

August 1985 - After a November 1984 fire destroyed 17 acres of the roof of Building 3001, Tinker Air Force Base, Tulsa District completes the $63.5 million repairs.

October 1, 1985 - Tulsa assumes duties for two Air Force bases and one Department of Energy plant in the Texas panhandle; Arkansas military installations are shifted to the Little Rock District.

1986 - Passage of an omnibus water bill, the Water Resources Development Act of 1986 which was the first omnibus bill in 16 years, authorizes numerous projects for Tulsa District and heralds a new era of local/federal cost-sharing partnership.

1989 - Tulsa became the Design Center for the Hazardous, Toxic, and Radiological Waste program for the entire five state Southwestern Division.

1995 - Tulsa District, working under the Federal Emergency Management Agency, responds to the bombing attack on the Murrah Federal Building in Oklahoma City. The Corps primary role was public works and engineering.

2000 - Mingo Creek Local Protection Project in Tulsa completed. The project consists of construction of 23 floodwater detention sites and approx. 10 miles of channelization along Mingo Creek and its tributaries. It reduced flooding to approx. 3,000 single family residences and 125 apartment buildings in the flood plain.

2006 - Tenkiller Auxiliary Spillway completed and dedication. The auxiliary spillway has five 50-foot wide by 35-foot high tainter gates constructed near the right abutment of the embankment. The spillway structure is similar to the existing spillway. In addition, a new Highway 100 bridge was built to carry traffic across the upstream approach channel for the new spillway.

2009 - Tulsa District receives funding for more than 200 projects across the district as part of the American Recovery and Reinvestment Act of 2009. The total funding received totaled more than $125 million.

2011 - The district completed all Base Realignment and Closure Act of 2005 construction projects meeting the September 2011 deadline.

2012 - For the first time on the McClellan-Kerr Arkansas River Navigation System, a pintle ball is removed and replaced at one of the system's locks. Workers drained all water from the lock, raised the dam gate, removed the damaged pintle and installed the new pintle.

2013 - A Supersaturated Dissolved Oxygen System is completed at Tenkiller Dam in Oklahoma. The stream below the dam is home to a trout fishery, that during times of drought experiences low dissolved oxygen levels and high water temperatures that results in fish kills. As a result of a multi-agency effort, a two-part mechanical solution was developed to prevent further fish kills below the dam. The low flow pipe system and the Supersaturated Dissolved Oxygen System were the result of a partnership between the Corps of Engineers, Oklahoma Department of Wildlife Conservation, Southwestern Power Administration, U.S. Fish and Wildlife Service, Oklahoma Water Resources Board, Sequoyah Fuel, Tenkiller Utilities, Trout Unlimited, and Tulsa Fly Fisherman.

=== Early assignments ===
Its early assignments included

- completing the Great Salt Plains and Fort Supply Lakes, which were already under construction
- design and construction work on authorized Canton, Optima, and Hulah Lakes
- continuing studies leading to authorization of Mannford (Keystone), Oologah, Tenkiller Ferry, and Wister Lakes
- continuing cooperation on work for Grand Lake (then under construction), Markham Ferry and Fort Gibson Dam

On October 1, 1980 a portion of the Tulsa District within Arkansas was transferred to the Little Rock District. In 1981 Tulsa District resumed military responsibility for four installations in Arkansas and five in Oklahoma, and in 1982 Tulsa District surrendered pieces of Missouri, New Mexico, and Colorado and picked up the remainder of the Arkansas River Basin in Kansas.

After a November 1984 fire destroyed 17 acres of the roof of Building 3001, Tinker Air Force Base, Tulsa District completed the $63.5 million repairs in August 1985.

On October 1, 1985 Tulsa assumed duties for two Air Force bases and one Department of Energy plant in the Texas panhandle; and Arkansas military installations were shifted to Little Rock District.

In 2000, Mingo Creek Local Protection Project in Tulsa was completed. The project consists of 23 floodwater detention sites and approximately 10 miles of channelization along Mingo Creek and its tributaries. It reduced flooding to approx. 3,000 single family residences and 125 apartment buildings in the flood plain.

== Projects ==
=== Great Salt Planes ===
LOCAL HISTORY: In 1811, Sans Orielle, an Osage Indian, with others of his tribe, guided Major George C. Sibley, Indian Agent from Fort Osage, Missouri, and his party to Salt Plains. They are thought to have been the first white men to see the Plains, which Major Sibley called the Grand Saline.

The Salt Fork of the Arkansas River, flowing around the plain, was known to the Osages as Nescatunga (big salt water). Another early day explorer to see the Plains was Capt. Nathan Boone, who headed a Government expedition from Fort Gibson into what is now central Kansas in 1843.

The Great Salt Plains have been the scene of many Indian Councils, both of war and peace. In drafting the treaty which defined the territory to become the so called permanent home of the Cherokees in 1828, the United States Government withheld the Salt Plains area with the provision that, "The right is reserved to the United States to allow other tribes of red men to get salt on the Great Salt Plains in common with the Cherokee Tribe."

The value of the Plains lay not in its salt alone, but in the rich hunting afforded by the animals migrating there for the salt supply, and possession of this area is said to have been the muse of many Indian battles. In the earliest of the settlement of the Indian Territory, Western Kansas and Texas cattlemen sent wagons to the Plains to haul away great loads of salt. A local legend of interest concerns a cache of gold that was reportedly buried in the vicinity of the dam. In 1850, five men were returning to Missouri from California with fourteen bars of gold. In the vicinity of the present dam, they were attacked by Cheyenne-Arapaho Indians, three of the men being killed.

The two remaining men wrapped the gold in a buffalo calfskin and buried it, marking the spot with an end-gate rod from their wagon. At least one of the men survived, since in 1901 Carl Sheldon arrived in the area with a map showing the location of the buried gold. Mr. Sheldon continued to search for the gold until 1940 when he was forced to leave because of the dam construction. In 1904, Sheldon had sample of the material from the drill bit assayed and traces of gold and the hide reportedly were found. Due to shaft cave-ins and movement by underlying quicksand, this was the closest Sheldon came to finding the gold.

DEVELOPMENT: The Great Salt Plains Dam and Lake located on the Salt Fork of the Arkansas River is the oldest Corps of Engineers’ project in the Tulsa District, authorized by Congress in the Flood Control Act of 1936. The Little Rock District started construction in September 1938. When the Tulsa District was organized in July 1939, the project was placed under their jurisdiction and was completed in July 1941 at a cost of some $4.6 million.
