= Jordy Mercer =

American baseball player (born 1986)

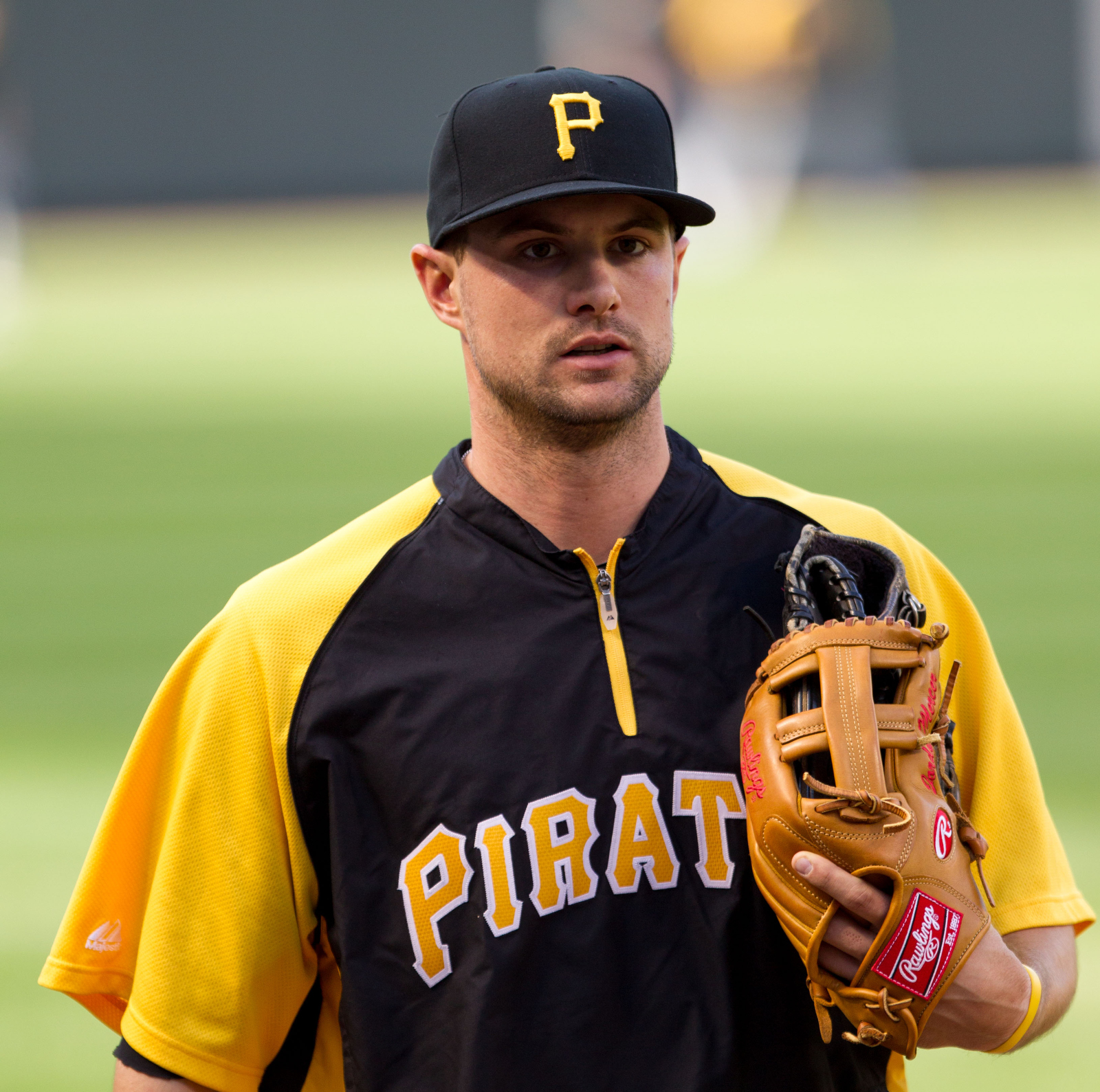
- Mercer with the Pittsburgh Pirates in 2012
- Shortstop
- Born: August 27, 1986 (age 40); Taloga, Oklahoma, U.S.
- Batted: Right Threw: Right

MLB debut
- May 29, 2012, for the Pittsburgh Pirates

Last MLB appearance
- October 3, 2021, for the Washington Nationals

MLB statistics
- Batting average: .256
- Home runs: 66
- Runs batted in: 308
- Stats at Baseball Reference

Teams
- Pittsburgh Pirates (2012–2018); Detroit Tigers (2019–2020); New York Yankees (2020); Washington Nationals (2021)
Medals
Men's baseball
Representing United States
Pan American Games
Silver medal – second place	2007 Cidade do Rock	Team
Silver medal – second place	2011 Guadalajara	Team
World Port Tournament
Bronze medal – third place	2007 Rotterdam	Team

Jordy Joe Mercer (born August 27, 1986) is an American former professional baseball infielder. He played in Major League Baseball (MLB) for the Pittsburgh Pirates, Detroit Tigers, New York Yankees, and Washington Nationals. Prior to beginning his professional career, he played college baseball at Oklahoma State University. He has also competed for the United States national baseball team in international competition. Mercer bats and throws right-handed.

== Amateur career ==
Mercer attended Taloga High School in Taloga, Oklahoma. Mercer earned All-State honors in high school and played three seasons starting at shortstop for the Elk City Travelers of Oklahoma amateur baseball organization. Out of high school, the Los Angeles Dodgers drafted Mercer in the 26th round (796th overall) of the 2005 MLB draft. Mercer did not sign, as he did not feel ready for professional baseball. Mercer attended Oklahoma State University–Stillwater, where he played baseball for the Oklahoma State Cowboys baseball team in the Big 12 Conference. At Oklahoma State, Mercer was a shortstop and pitcher, serving as the team's closer. He was named to the Big 12 All-Star Team as a utility player in 2006 and 2008. He set the Oklahoma State record for saves.

In the summer of 2007, following his sophomore year at Oklahoma State, Mercer joined the U.S. national baseball team. He competed in the 2007 Pan American Games, winning silver, and 2007 World Port Tournament, winning silver.

Mercer competed for the U.S. team in the 2011 Pan American Games, winning silver. He also competed for the U.S. in the 2011 Baseball World Cup.

== Professional career ==
=== Pittsburgh Pirates ===
The Pirates drafted Mercer in the third round, with the 79th overall selection, of the 2008 MLB draft, choosing him as a shortstop. He began his professional career that season with the State College Spikes of the Low–A New York–Penn League, before he was promoted to the Hickory Crawdads of the Single–A South Atlantic League. In 2009, Mercer played for the Lynchburg Hillcats of the High–A Carolina League, finishing fifth in the Carolina League and second in the Pirates' farm system with 83 runs batted in (RBI). He was promoted to the Altoona Curve of the Double-A Eastern League in 2010. He began the 2010 season with Altoona, before receiving a promotion to the Indianapolis Indians of the Triple-A of the International League. The Pirates added him to their 40-man roster after the 2011 season to protect him from the Rule 5 draft.

On May 29, 2012, the Pirates optioned Yamaico Navarro to Indianapolis and promoted Mercer to MLB. Mercer recorded his first MLB hit off Cincinnati Reds pitcher Johnny Cueto on May 30, 2012. Mercer got only 9 at-bats with the Pirates before being sent back to Indianapolis on June 24, 2012.

On May 3, 2013, Mercer was called up from Indianapolis and led the Pirates to a 3–1 victory over the Washington Nationals with a two-run home run. On May 11, 2013, he had his first multiple home run game with two home runs against the New York Mets. Mercer was sent back to Indianapolis when Neil Walker was activated from the disabled list on May 13. Mercer was recalled on May 15 when John McDonald was placed on the disabled list.

Mercer was named the new Pirates starting shortstop for the 2014 season, with Clint Barmes becoming his backup. In his first full season as a starter, Mercer hit .255 with 12 home runs and 55 RBIs in 149 games.

Mercer competed with Korean rookie Jung-ho Kang for playing time in 2015. On July 19, 2015, Mercer suffered a leg contusion and sprained medial collateral ligament after being slid into at second base by Brewers outfielder Carlos Gómez. Mercer's season was cut short to 116 games, hitting .244 with 3 home runs.

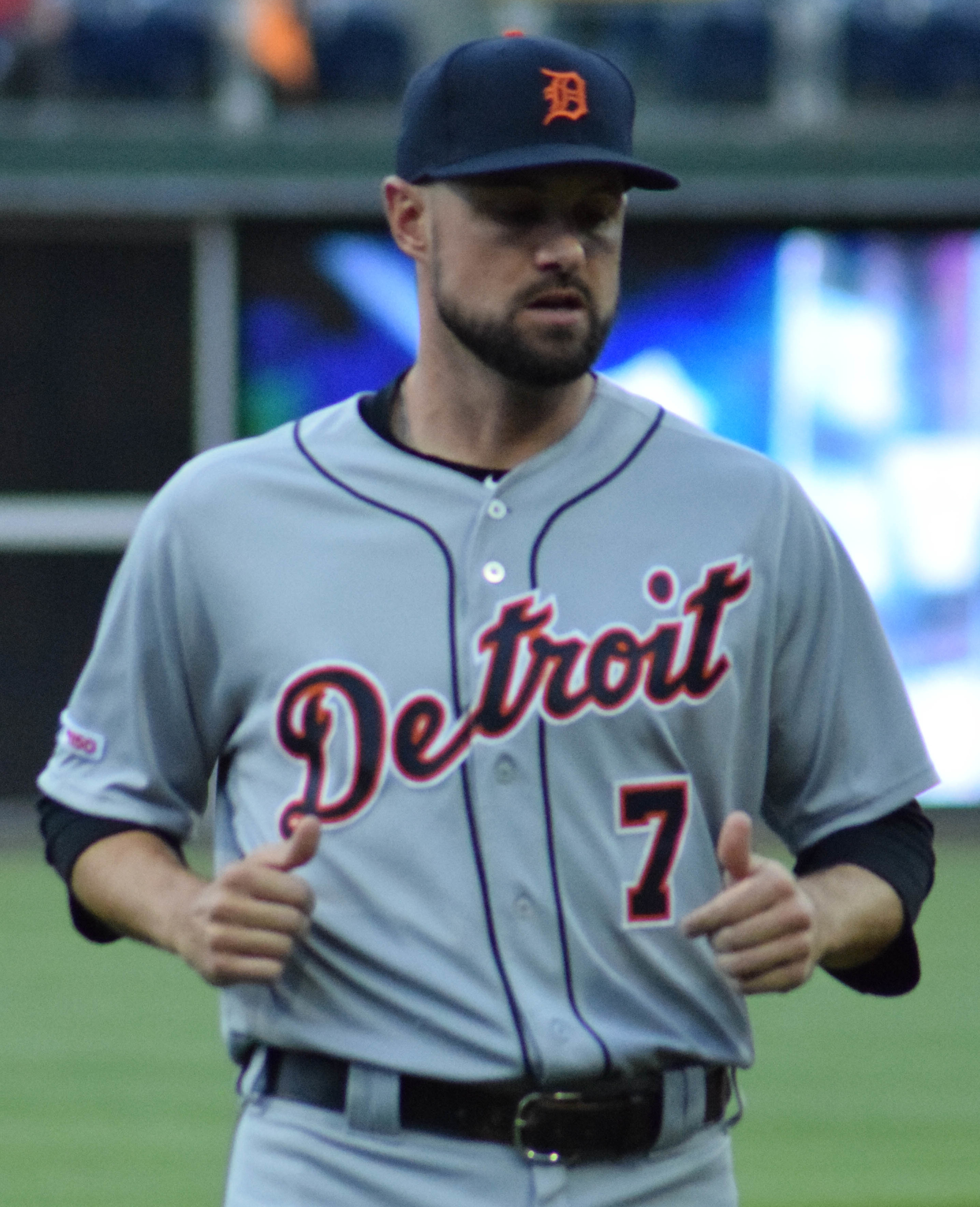
Mercer with the Detroit Tigers in 2019

In 2016, he played in 149 games, establishing career highs in at bats (519), runs (66), RBIs (59) and walks (51). The following season, Mercer hit a career high 14 home runs in 145 games. In 2018, Mercer was placed on the disabled list on August 16 due to a calf injury. He ended the season playing in 117 games, hitting .251 with 6 home runs.

After the 2018 MLB season, and eleven years in the Pirates organization, Mercer became a free agent.

=== Detroit Tigers ===
On December 14, 2018, Mercer signed a one-year $5.25 million contract with the Detroit Tigers.

On April 13, 2019, he was placed on the injured list with a right quad injury. He was recalled on April 30, but went back on the injured list May 8 and did not return to major league action until July 1. Mercer was solid at the plate over the last two months of the season, hitting .342 in August and .302 in September, to finish the 2019 season at .270. He also had 9 home runs and drove in 22 runs in 256 at-bats. Mercer became a free agent following the 2019 season.

On January 30, 2020, the Tigers signed Mercer to a minor-league contract with an invitation to spring training. Mercer was released by the Tigers prior to the 2020 season in March; he re-signed with the Tigers on a minor league pact shortly after his release. Mercer made the Opening Day roster for the Tigers in 2020. On August 6, Mercer was outrighted off of the 40-man roster and he elected free agency.

=== New York Yankees ===
On August 17, 2020, Mercer signed a minor league contract with the New York Yankees. The Yankees promoted Mercer to the major leagues on August 28. On September 1, Mercer was designated for assignment by the Yankees.

=== Washington Nationals ===
On February 5, 2021, Mercer signed a minor league contract with the Washington Nationals organization. On March 27, 2021, Mercer was selected to the 40-man roster. On April 10, 2021, Mercer had 3 hits in his debut with the Nationals. On June 30, Mercer hit his first home run with the team.

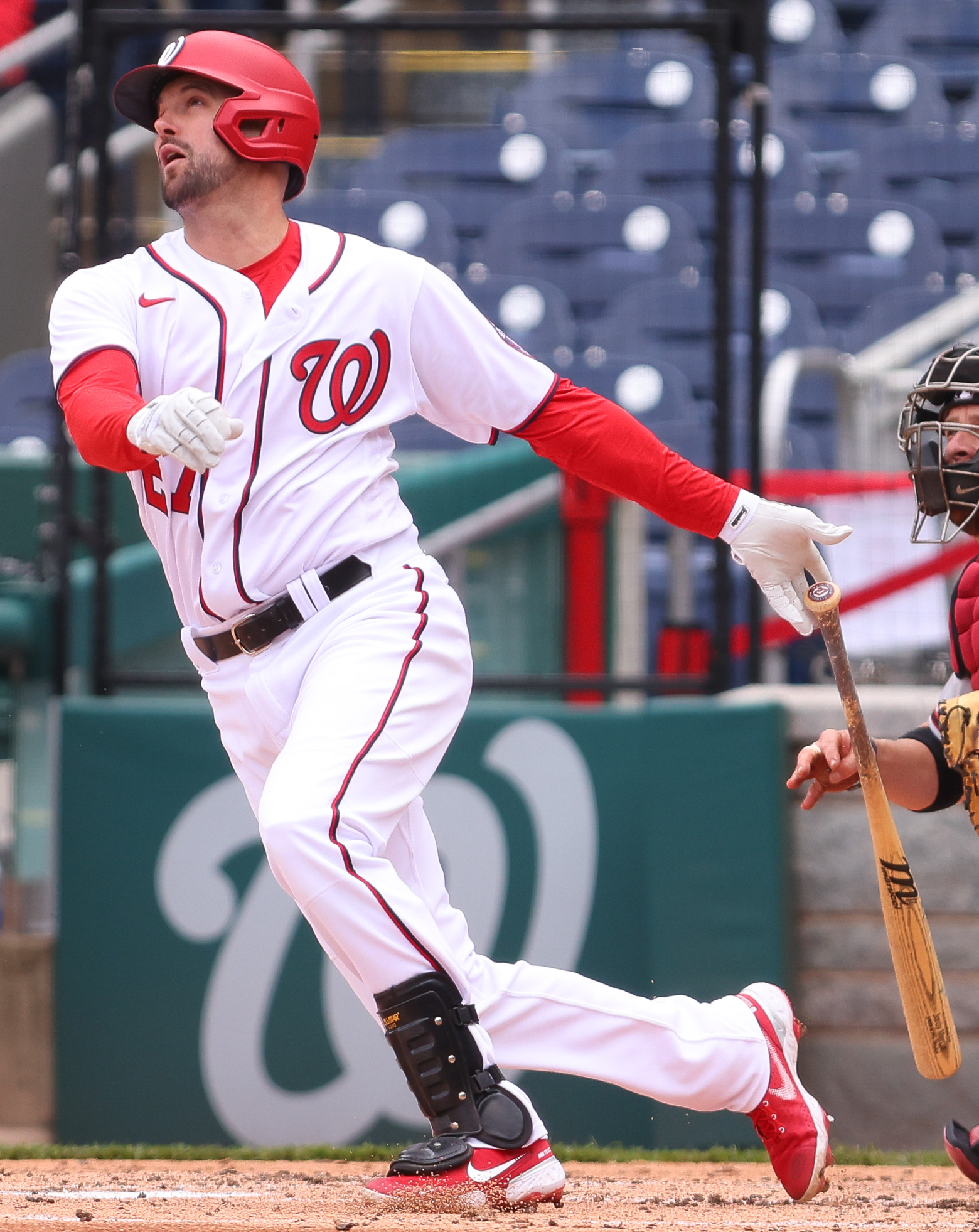
Mercer with the Nationals in 2021

On April 5, 2022, Mercer announced his retirement from professional baseball.

== Personal ==
Mercer and his wife, Kacey, have two sons.

Mercer grew up an Atlanta Braves fan.
