= Seiling Milling Company =

- U.S. National Register of Historic Places
- Location within Oklahoma
- Location: 4th and Orange St., Seiling, Oklahoma
- Coordinates: 36.148985°N 98.92860°W
- Area: less than one acre
- Built: 1917-18
- NRHP reference No.: 83004167
- Added to NRHP: December 8, 1983

The Seiling Milling Company in Seiling, Oklahoma was listed on the National Register of Historic Places in 1983.

Its original mill building was built in 1917–18. A two-story engine room with basement was added in 1923.

It was originally located in farm and prairie land, now is located within the limits of Seiling.
