= Dewey County Courthouse =

- U.S. National Register of Historic Places
- Location within Oklahoma Location within the United States
- Location: Broadway and Ruble St., Taloga, Oklahoma
- Coordinates: 36°02′18″N 98°57′51″W
- Area: 1 acre (0.40 ha)
- Built: 1925
- Built by: Krioke-Shafer Construction Co.
- Architect: Jayne, Maurice
- MPS: County Courthouses of Oklahoma TR
- NRHP reference No.: 85000680
- Added to NRHP: March 22, 1985

The Dewey County Courthouse in Taloga, Oklahoma was built in 1925. It was listed on the National Register of Historic Places in 1985.

The courthouse is a three-story building with a flat roof. Its exterior originally was red brick, with quoins, but was stuccoed over in 1940. It has a projecting cornice with a plain parapet. It was designed by Maurice Jayne and was built by the Krioke-Shafer Construction Co.

The listing included two contributing buildings and a contributing structure. An old jail, from c.1900, and a vault, from c.1910, are the other two resources. The vault was an addition to the previous courthouse, which burned.
