= Vici, Oklahoma =

- Town
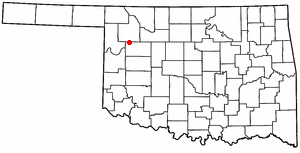
- Location of Vici, Oklahoma
- Coordinates: 36°08′56″N 99°17′58″W
- Country: United States
- State: Oklahoma
- County: Dewey

Area
  - Total: 0.43 sq mi (1.12 km^{2})
  - Land: 0.43 sq mi (1.12 km^{2})
  - Water: 0 sq mi (0.00 km^{2})
- Elevation: 2,264 ft (690 m)

Population (2020)
  - Total: 611
  - Density: 1,407.5/sq mi (543.45/km^{2})
- Time zone: UTC-6 (Central (CST))
  - Summer (DST): UTC-5 (CDT)
- ZIP code: 73859
- Area code: 580
- FIPS code: 40-77300
- GNIS feature ID: 2413432
- Website: www.townofvici.com

Vici /ˈvaɪsaɪ/ is a town in Dewey County, Oklahoma, United States. The population was 611 at the time of the 2020 census. No information appears on the origins of the town name, but Vici is Latin for “I conquered.”

== History ==
Although it had a couple of nearby predecessor settlements, the current town of Vici was platted on September 11, 1911, at a time when buildings were being moved to the site to be close to the tracks of the newly-built Wichita Falls and Northwestern Railway, later part of the Missouri–Kansas–Texas Railroad. The Vici M-K-T Depot on Houser St. between 7th and 8th is on the National Register of Historic Places listings in Dewey County, Oklahoma.

The town became a prosperous agricultural-products shipping point through the 1940s. Rail service ended in 1972, but activities such as ranching, oil and gas, and a large nursing home became important economic drivers in the modern era.

In 2010 the movie The Dome of Heaven was shot in Vici featuring some local residents in the film, including Mark Randall, Molly Randall, and Travis Dennett and Trey Verhoeff.

The 200MW Persimmon Creek Wind Farm, north-northwest of town, has been online since September 2018.

== Geography ==
According to the United States Census Bureau, the town has a total area of 0.4 square miles (1.0 km^{2}), all land.

Vici is at the intersection of U.S. Route 60 and Oklahoma State Highway 34.

Vici Municipal Airport (FAA Identifier: 5O1) is one mile south of town, and features a paved 2565’ x 50’ runway.

== Demographics ==
Historical population
Census	Pop.	Note	%±
1930	482		—
1940	257		−46.7%
1950	261		1.6%
1960	456		74.7%
1970	588		28.9%
1980	928		57.8%
1990	880		−5.2%
2000	668		−24.1%
2010	699		4.6%
2020	611		−12.6%
U.S. Decennial Census

=== 2020 census ===
As of the 2020 census, Vici had a population of 611. The median age was 41.8 years. 21.8% of residents were under the age of 18 and 24.9% of residents were 65 years of age or older. For every 100 females there were 90.3 males, and for every 100 females age 18 and over there were 88.9 males age 18 and over.

0.0% of residents lived in urban areas, while 100.0% lived in rural areas.

There were 249 households in Vici, of which 22.9% had children under the age of 18 living in them. Of all households, 45.8% were married-couple households, 20.5% were households with a male householder and no spouse or partner present, and 28.1% were households with a female householder and no spouse or partner present. About 36.2% of all households were made up of individuals and 20.1% had someone living alone who was 65 years of age or older.

There were 323 housing units, of which 22.9% were vacant. The homeowner vacancy rate was 0.0% and the rental vacancy rate was 19.0%.

Racial composition as of the 2020 census
Race	Number	Percent
White	542	88.7%
Black or African American	3	0.5%
American Indian and Alaska Native	11	1.8%
Asian	0	0.0%
Native Hawaiian and Other Pacific Islander	2	0.3%
Some other race	15	2.5%
Two or more races	38	6.2%
Hispanic or Latino (of any race)	61	10.0%

=== 2000 census ===
As of the 2000 census, there were 668 people, 283 households, and 164 families residing in the town. The population density was 1,570.6 inhabitants per square mile (606.4/km^{2}). There were 341 housing units at an average density of 801.8 per square mile (309.6/km^{2}).

There were 283 households, out of which 24.4% had children under the age of 18 living with them, 48.8% were married couples living together, 6.7% had a female householder with no husband present, and 41.7% were non-families. 37.5% of all households were made up of individuals, and 21.9% had someone living alone who was 65 years of age or older. The average household size was 2.17 and the average family size was 2.91.

In the town, the population was spread out, with 19.3% under the age of 18, 9.4% from 18 to 24, 23.1% from 25 to 44, 20.8% from 45 to 64, and 27.4% who were 65 years of age or older. The median age was 44 years. For every 100 females, there were 83.0 males. For every 100 females age 18 and over, there were 76.7 males.

The median income for a household in the town was $24,265, and the median income for a family was $36,250. Males had a median income of $29,091 versus $17,500 for females. The per capita income for the town was $13,267. About 12.2% of families and 14.3% of the population were below the poverty line, including 15.3% of those under age 18 and 19.0% of those age 65 or over.

== Education ==
- Vici was annexed into the High Plains Technology Center District on May 12, 2009.
- Vici Public Schools
