= Longdale, Oklahoma =

Town in Oklahoma, US

- Town
- Nickname: Home of the Redmen
- Motto: Labor Omnia Vincit
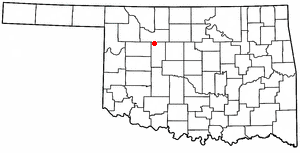
- Location of Longdale, Oklahoma
- Coordinates: 36°08′02″N 98°33′04″W
- Country: United States
- State: Oklahoma
- County: Blaine

Area
  - Total: 0.26 sq mi (0.68 km^{2})
  - Land: 0.26 sq mi (0.68 km^{2})
  - Water: 0 sq mi (0.00 km^{2})
- Elevation: 1,654 ft (504 m)

Population (2020)
  - Total: 186
  - Density: 705.8/sq mi (272.51/km^{2})
- Time zone: UTC−6 (Central (CST))
  - Summer (DST): UTC−5 (CDT)
- ZIP Code: 73755
- Area code: 580
- FIPS code: 40-43950
- GNIS feature ID: 2412912

Longdale is a town in northwestern Blaine County, Oklahoma, United States. As of the 2020 census, Longdale had a population of 186.

== History ==
The town was named for Lucious Walter Long, the husband of Carrie M. Millerman, who had obtained a homestead in the Cheyenne-Arapaho Opening of April 19, 1892. The two married and made her homestead the town site. They donated 160 acres (65 ha) on the north side of their property to the Union Real Estate and Townsite Company, while retaining the southern side themselves, which they divided into residential and commercial lots. The Longs wanted to name their new community Longview, but agreed to change to Longdale to avoid confusion with the already existing community of Fairview.

Historians have sometimes confused Longdale with Cainville. The latter was 2 miles (3.2 km) north of Longdale, and already had a post office, where the residents of Longdale could receive their mail. The Cainville post office was discontinued and moved to Longdale on November 28, 1903, with Robert L. Eaton as the new postmaster. On October 23, 1903, G. W. published the first edition of his newspaper, the Longdale Register. The Longs already had sold part of their property to the Kansas City, Mexico and Orient Railway, which finally reached Longdale on June 10, 1905.

Carrie Millerman became the first teacher when a school opened November 30, 1894, in a temporary location 2 miles (3.2 km) north of Longdale. A new school building opened in Longdale on November 5, 1906, replacing the temporary facility. By the first census in 1910, Longdale had a population of 296.

== Geography ==
Longdale is located north of Canton Lake on State Highway 58.

According to the United States Census Bureau, the town has a total area of 0.3 square miles (0.78 km^{2}), all land.

=== Climate ===
Climate data for Longdale, Oklahoma
Month	Jan	Feb	Mar	Apr	May	Jun	Jul	Aug	Sep	Oct	Nov	Dec	Year
Mean daily maximum °F (°C)	45.8 (7.7)	51.2 (10.7)	60.4 (15.8)	70.5 (21.4)	79.0 (26.1)	88.0 (31.1)	94.5 (34.7)	92.8 (33.8)	84.1 (28.9)	73.2 (22.9)	59.0 (15.0)	48.2 (9.0)	70.6 (21.4)
Mean daily minimum °F (°C)	20.5 (−6.4)	25.5 (−3.6)	34.4 (1.3)	46.0 (7.8)	55.7 (13.2)	64.7 (18.2)	69.8 (21.0)	67.6 (19.8)	59.6 (15.3)	47.4 (8.6)	34.9 (1.6)	24.1 (−4.4)	45.9 (7.7)
Average precipitation inches (mm)	0.6 (15)	1.1 (28)	2.1 (53)	2.3 (58)	4.3 (110)	3.8 (97)	2.4 (61)	2.4 (61)	3.2 (81)	2.0 (51)	1.8 (46)	0.8 (20)	26.8 (680)
Source 1: weather.com
Source 2: Weatherbase.com

== Demographics ==
Historical population
Census	Pop.	Note	%±
1910	296		—
1920	308		4.1%
1930	284		−7.8%
1940	291		2.5%
1950	277		−4.8%
1960	218		−21.3%
1970	331		51.8%
1980	405		22.4%
1990	281		−30.6%
2000	310		10.3%
2010	262		−15.5%
2020	186		−29.0%
U.S. Decennial Census

=== 2020 census ===
As of the 2020 census, Longdale had a population of 186. The median age was 52.3 years. 21.0% of residents were under the age of 18 and 23.7% of residents were 65 years of age or older. For every 100 females there were 116.3 males, and for every 100 females age 18 and over there were 110.0 males age 18 and over.

0.0% of residents lived in urban areas, while 100.0% lived in rural areas.

There were 94 households in Longdale, of which 20.2% had children under the age of 18 living in them. Of all households, 37.2% were married-couple households, 31.9% were households with a male householder and no spouse or partner present, and 25.5% were households with a female householder and no spouse or partner present. About 40.4% of all households were made up of individuals and 21.3% had someone living alone who was 65 years of age or older.

There were 139 housing units, of which 32.4% were vacant. The homeowner vacancy rate was 1.2% and the rental vacancy rate was 0.0%.

Racial composition as of the 2020 census
Race	Number	Percent
White	152	81.7%
Black or African American	0	0.0%
American Indian and Alaska Native	10	5.4%
Asian	0	0.0%
Native Hawaiian and Other Pacific Islander	0	0.0%
Some other race	2	1.1%
Two or more races	22	11.8%
Hispanic or Latino (of any race)	11	5.9%

=== 2000 census ===
The median income for a household in the town was $19,000, and the median income for a family was $22,500. Males had a median income of $27,813 versus $16,250 for females. The per capita income for the town was $9,744. About 23.3% of families and 23.1% of the population were below the poverty line, including 25.0% of those under age 18 and 37.8% of those age 65 or over.

== Education ==
Longdale School, which closed in 1991, was nothing more than a single class of 20 kids and was closed due to a lack of funding and constant drug problems.

== Notable person ==
- Merlin Little Thunder. Southern Cheyenne artist, attended elementary school in Longdale.
