= Southwestern Division =

US Army Corps of Engineers division

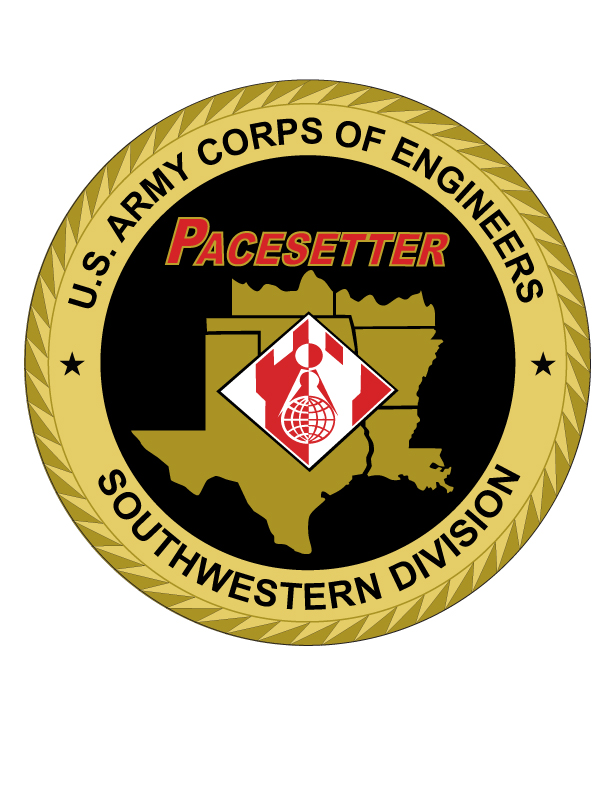
Division emblem

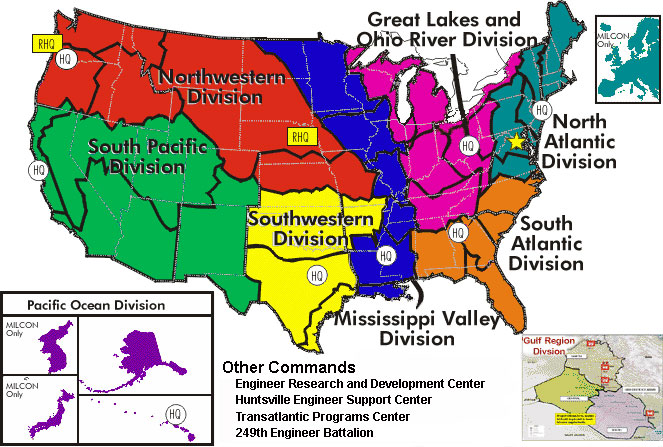
USACE Southwestern Division, shown in yellow

The United States Army Corps of Engineers Southwestern Division (SWD) is one of the eight permanent divisions of the Army organization, providing civil works and military water resource services and infrastructure. It also supports economically viable and environmentally sustainable watershed management and water resources development in Texas, Arkansas, Oklahoma, Louisiana and New Mexico.

The Southwestern Division (SWD) is headquartered in Dallas, Texas, and has been providing service to the region since 1937. The Division was originally located in Little Rock, Arkansas, but in 1941 moved to its current location in Dallas. Its territory stretches from Mexico to Kansas, and covers all or part of seven states. The Southwestern Division civil works encompass 2.3 million acres (9,300 km^{2}) of public land and water. The military works include 10 Army installations and 11 Air Force installations within the SWD boundaries. And SWD's recreation areas are the most visited in the Corps, with more than 11,400 miles (18,300 km) of shoreline and 1,172 recreation sites.

The Division Commander is directly responsible to the Chief of Engineers. The SWD Commander directs and supervises the individual District Commanders. The current SWD commander is Col. George H. Walter.

SWD duties include:

- Preparing engineering studies and design.
- Constructing, operating, and maintaining flood control and river and harbor facilities and installations.
- Administering the laws on civil works activities.
- Acquiring, managing, and disposing of real estate.
- Mobilization support of military, natural disaster, and national emergency operations.

== Districts ==
The Division's four districts are headquartered in:

- Little Rock, Arkansas
- Tulsa, Oklahoma
- Galveston, Texas
- Fort Worth, Texas
