= Taloga, Oklahoma =

- Town
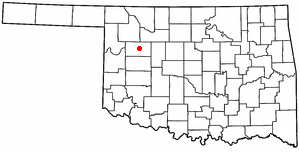
- Location of Taloga, Oklahoma
- Coordinates: 36°02′25″N 98°57′51″W
- Country: United States
- State: Oklahoma
- County: Dewey

Area
  - Total: 0.52 sq mi (1.34 km^{2})
  - Land: 0.52 sq mi (1.34 km^{2})
  - Water: 0 sq mi (0.00 km^{2})
- Elevation: 1,709 ft (521 m)

Population (2020)
  - Total: 288
  - Density: 558.0/sq mi (215.45/km^{2})
- Time zone: UTC-6 (Central (CST))
  - Summer (DST): UTC-5 (CDT)
- ZIP code: 73667
- Area code: 580
- FIPS code: 40-72350
- GNIS feature ID: 2413364

Taloga is a town in Dewey County, Oklahoma, United States. The population was 288 at the time of the 2020 census. It is the county seat of Dewey County. The town lies near the southern bank of a bend of the Canadian River, along U.S. Route 183, approximately thirty-seven miles north of Clinton.

== History ==
According to the Encyclopedia of Oklahoma History and Culture, the name is of Indian origin and means either "beautiful valley" or "rocking water".

The Taloga Wind project outside of town, dedicated in March 2012, can generate up to 130 megawatts of power, which is enough to meet the needs of about 35,000 homes. All electricity produced by the project is provided to Oklahoma Gas and Electric Company under a 20-year power purchase agreement.

The Dewey County Courthouse, from 1925, is on the NHRP listings.

== Geography ==
Taloga is located 37 miles (60 km) north of Clinton.

According to the United States Census Bureau, the town has a total area of 0.5 square miles (1.3 km^{2}), all land. The Canadian River flows nearby.

Canton Lake is to the east-northeast.

=== Climate ===
Climate data for Taloga, Oklahoma (1991–2020)
| Month | Jan | Feb | Mar | Apr | May | Jun | Jul | Aug | Sep | Oct | Nov | Dec | Year |
|---|---|---|---|---|---|---|---|---|---|---|---|---|---|
| Mean daily maximum °F (°C) | 49.6 (9.8) | 52.9 (11.6) | 62.2 (16.8) | 71.2 (21.8) | 80.4 (26.9) | 90.0 (32.2) | 95.3 (35.2) | 94.1 (34.5) | 85.8 (29.9) | 73.5 (23.1) | 61.2 (16.2) | 49.8 (9.9) | 72.2 (22.3) |
| Daily mean °F (°C) | 35.4 (1.9) | 38.2 (3.4) | 47.5 (8.6) | 56.4 (13.6) | 67.0 (19.4) | 77.0 (25.0) | 81.5 (27.5) | 80.1 (26.7) | 71.7 (22.1) | 58.6 (14.8) | 46.1 (7.8) | 36.3 (2.4) | 58.0 (14.4) |
| Mean daily minimum °F (°C) | 21.3 (−5.9) | 23.4 (−4.8) | 32.7 (0.4) | 41.7 (5.4) | 53.6 (12.0) | 64.0 (17.8) | 67.7 (19.8) | 66.1 (18.9) | 57.7 (14.3) | 43.7 (6.5) | 31.0 (−0.6) | 22.8 (−5.1) | 43.8 (6.6) |
| Average precipitation inches (mm) | 0.98 (25) | 1.07 (27) | 1.98 (50) | 2.93 (74) | 3.69 (94) | 4.06 (103) | 3.14 (80) | 2.78 (71) | 2.60 (66) | 2.82 (72) | 1.47 (37) | 1.28 (33) | 28.8 (732) |
| Average snowfall inches (cm) | 3.2 (8.1) | 2.7 (6.9) | 2.1 (5.3) | 0.0 (0.0) | 0.0 (0.0) | 0.0 (0.0) | 0.0 (0.0) | 0.0 (0.0) | 0.0 (0.0) | 0.1 (0.25) | 0.8 (2.0) | 3.4 (8.6) | 12.3 (31.15) |
Source: NOAA

== Demographics ==
Historical population
| Census | Pop. | Note | %± |
|---|---|---|---|
| 1910 | 468 | | — |
| 1920 | 365 | | −22.0% |
| 1930 | 436 | | 19.5% |
| 1940 | 533 | | 22.2% |
| 1950 | 430 | | −19.3% |
| 1960 | 322 | | −25.1% |
| 1970 | 363 | | 12.7% |
| 1980 | 446 | | 22.9% |
| 1990 | 415 | | −7.0% |
| 2000 | 372 | | −10.4% |
| 2010 | 299 | | −19.6% |
| 2020 | 288 | | −3.7% |
U.S. Decennial Census

=== 2020 census ===
As of the 2020 census, Taloga had a population of 288. The median age was 42.0 years. 22.6% of residents were under the age of 18 and 24.0% of residents were 65 years of age or older. For every 100 females there were 94.6 males, and for every 100 females age 18 and over there were 90.6 males age 18 and over.

0.0% of residents lived in urban areas, while 100.0% lived in rural areas.

There were 130 households in Taloga, of which 31.5% had children under the age of 18 living in them. Of all households, 53.8% were married-couple households, 15.4% were households with a male householder and no spouse or partner present, and 23.8% were households with a female householder and no spouse or partner present. About 23.8% of all households were made up of individuals and 9.3% had someone living alone who was 65 years of age or older.

There were 157 housing units, of which 17.2% were vacant. The homeowner vacancy rate was 0.0% and the rental vacancy rate was 15.4%.

Racial composition as of the 2020 census
| Race | Number | Percent |
|---|---|---|
| White | 267 | 92.7% |
| Black or African American | 0 | 0.0% |
| American Indian and Alaska Native | 7 | 2.4% |
| Asian | 0 | 0.0% |
| Native Hawaiian and Other Pacific Islander | 0 | 0.0% |
| Some other race | 1 | 0.3% |
| Two or more races | 13 | 4.5% |
| Hispanic or Latino (of any race) | 12 | 4.2% |

=== 2000 census ===
As of the census of 2000, there were 372 people, 147 households, and 98 families residing in the town. The population density was 737.1 inhabitants per square mile (284.6/km^{2}). There were 185 housing units at an average density of 366.6 per square mile (141.5/km^{2}). The racial makeup of the town was 94.09% White, 0.81% African American, 2.69% Native American, 1.61% from other races, and 0.81% from two or more races. Hispanic or Latino of any race were 6.18% of the population. These figures are questionable because when added together, they equal more than 100%.

There were 147 households, out of which 29.3% had children under the age of 18 living with them, 59.2% were married couples living together, 5.4% had a female householder with no husband present, and 33.3% were non-families. 31.3% of all households were made up of individuals, and 16.3% had someone living alone who was 65 years of age or older. The average household size was 2.44 and the average family size was 3.10.

In the town, the population was spread out, with 26.6% under the age of 18, 6.5% from 18 to 24, 27.2% from 25 to 44, 24.7% from 45 to 64, and 15.1% who were 65 years of age or older. The median age was 40 years. For every 100 females, there were 96.8 males. For every 100 females age 18 and over, there were 96.4 males.

The median income for a household in the town was $33,281, and the median income for a family was $38,750. Males had a median income of $27,083 versus $21,875 for females. The per capita income for the town was $16,343. About 6.8% of families and 11.5% of the population were below the poverty line, including 12.7% of those under age 18 and 6.5% of those age 65 or over.

== Notable people ==
- Jordy Mercer, professional baseball player
