= Canton Lake (Oklahoma) =

Lake in Oklahoma, United States

- Location within Oklahoma Location within the United States
- Location: Blaine / Dewey counties, Oklahoma, US
- Coordinates: 36°7′23″N 98°35′58″W
- Primary inflows: North Canadian River
- Primary outflows: North Canadian River
- Basin countries: United States
- Water volume: 383,000 acre⋅ft (472 hm^{3})
- Shore length^{1}: 45 mi (72 km)
- Surface elevation: 1,615 ft (492 m)
- ^{1} Shore length is not a well-defined measure.

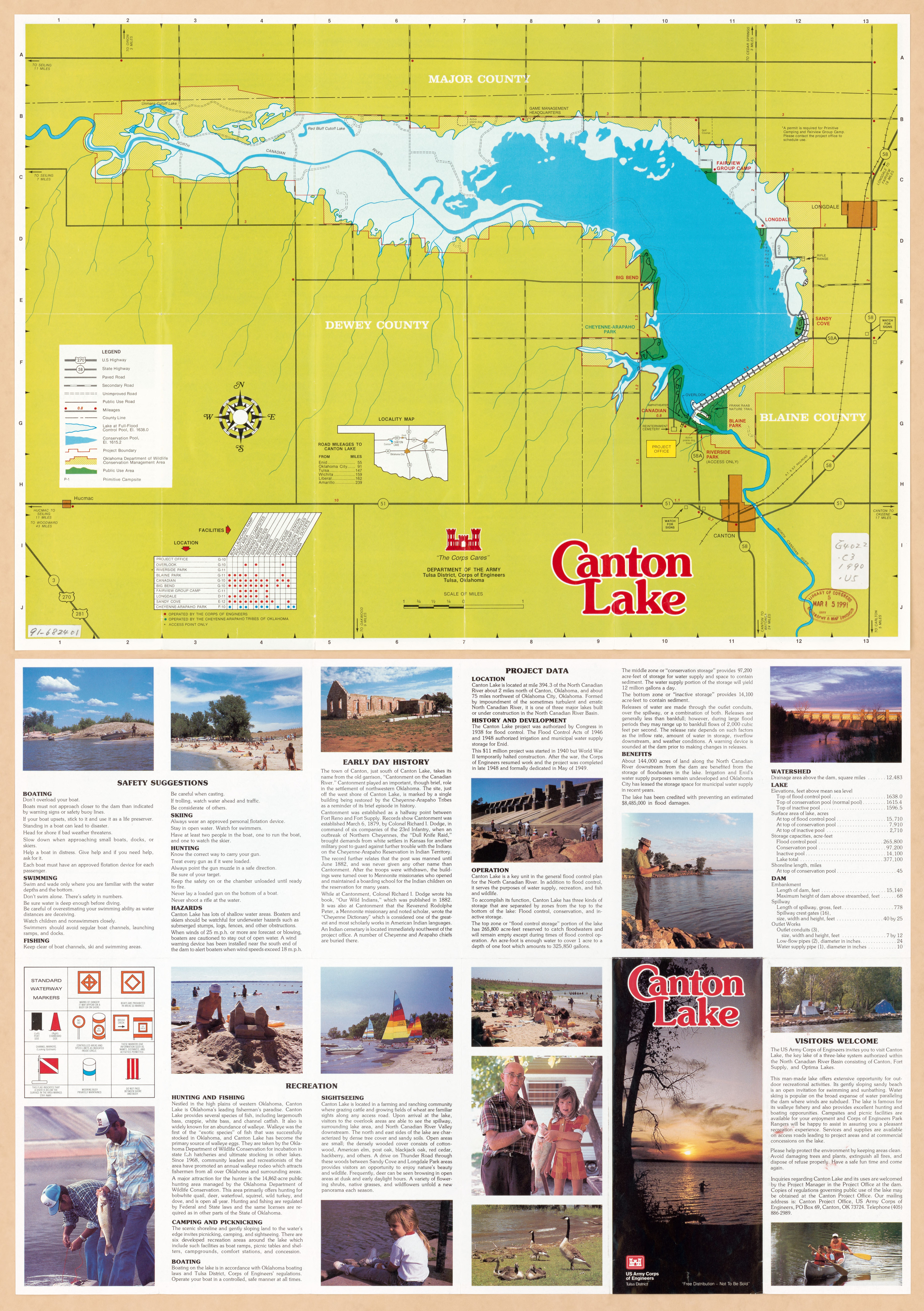
Canton Lake USACE information sheet

Canton Lake is a lake in Blaine and Dewey Counties in Oklahoma, near Longdale and Canton. Its main source of water is the North Canadian River. It is about an hour away from Enid. The lake serves as a municipal water supply reservoir for Oklahoma City, which pays to have water released from the lake for water-supply purposes.

Canton Dam was a 1948 project of the Southwestern Division of the United States Army Corps of Engineers. The earthen structure is 68 feet (21 m) high and 15,140 feet (4,610 m) long at its crest, with a maximum storage capacity of 383,000 acre-feet. The lake has a shoreline of 45 miles (72 km) Canton is owned and operated by the Army Corps of Engineers but Oklahoma City retains the storage rights. and covers an area of 7,910 acres.

The lake is home to several species of fish, including largemouth bass, white bass, channel catfish, crappie, and walleye. Canton has become the primary source of walleye eggs for incubation and stocking of other state lakes. Since 1968, community leaders and local merchants have promoted an annual Walleye Rodeo. The four-day event offers visitors the chance to win cash and other prizes that total over $30,000.

Facilities at the lake include boat ramps, picnic areas, RV and tent campsites, drinking water, group shelters, restrooms, showers, a swimming beach, concession services, and a nature trail.

In early 2013, Oklahoma City officials diverted 30,000 acre-ft of water from Canton Lake to Lake Hefner, to replenish the city's water supply. Later, spring rains replenished the level of that lake, which had to dump water into the North Canadian River to prevent the lake from overflowing. However, the effect was to leave Canton Lake 13 feet (4.0 m) below its normal level. This has contributed to an algae bloom.

In April 2016, the lake finally replenished from the 2013 water diversion Oklahoma City made.

In August 2022, Oklahoma City officials have requested a water release from Canton Lake to replenish Lake Hefner. The release is planned to lower lake Canton by about 2 feet (0.61 m) and raise Lake Hefner by an equal amount
