= McAllister House (Seiling, Oklahoma) =

Historic house in Oklahoma, United States

- U.S. National Register of Historic Places
- Location within Oklahoma Location within the United States
- Location: 311 N. Locust St., Seiling, Oklahoma
- Coordinates: 36°8′52″N 98°55′19″W
- Built: 1920
- Architectural style: Bungalow/Craftsman
- NRHP reference No.: 97000196
- Added to NRHP: February 27, 1997

McAllister House in Seiling, Oklahoma is a Bungalow/Craftsman-style house was built in 1920; it was built for Pat and Belva McAllister. It was listed on the National Register of Historic Places in 1987.

It was deemed notable architecturally as a Bungalow/Craftsman work, and as the only textured stucco-faced house surviving in Seiling.

The house has 14 rooms, seven gables and a total of 52 windows, counting 12 windows on its sunporch in the back. It was built at cost of $10,000 and has been regarded as the second finest home in Seiling.

The McAllisters were a prominent family in Seiling; James McAllister was the first mayor of Seiling.
