= National Register of Historic Places listings in Canadian County, Oklahoma =

Location of Canadian County in Oklahoma

This is a list of the National Register of Historic Places listings in Canadian County, Oklahoma.

This is intended to be a complete list of the properties and districts on the National Register of Historic Places in Canadian County, Oklahoma, United States. The locations of National Register properties and districts for which the latitude and longitude coordinates are included below, may be seen in a map.

There are 25 properties and districts listed on the National Register in the county.

This National Park Service list is complete through NPS recent listings posted March 27, 2026.

== Current listings ==
	Name on the Register	Image	Date listed	Location	City or town	Description
1	Avant's Cities Service Station	Avant's Cities Service Station	March 2, 2004 (#04000131)	220 S. Choctaw; 35°31′53″N 97°57′17″W	El Reno	
2	Bridgeport Hill Service Station		December 5, 2003 (#03001239)	Junction of Old U.S. Route 66 and a spur of U.S. Route 281; 35°33′03″N 98°16′36″W	Geary	
3	Bridgeport Hill-Hydro OK 66 Segment	Bridgeport Hill-Hydro OK 66 Segment	March 3, 2004 (#04000129)	State Highway 66 from Hydro east to a spur of U.S. Route 281; 35°32′29″N 98°24′43″W	Hydro	Extends into Caddo County
4	Canadian County Jail and Stable	Canadian County Jail and Stable	November 14, 1995 (#85002790)	300 S. Evans; 35°32′07″N 97°57′19″W	El Reno	
5	Carnegie Library	Carnegie Library	August 29, 1980 (#80003257)	215 E. Wade St. 35°31′53″N 97°57′05″W	El Reno	
6	Czech Hall	Czech Hall	November 25, 1980 (#80003258)	South of Yukon; 35°28′07″N 97°44′33″W	Yukon	
7	Darlington Agency Site	Darlington Agency Site	August 14, 1973 (#73001557)	About 6 miles (9.7 km) northwest of El Reno; 35°34′31″N 98°00′32″W	El Reno	
8	El Reno High School	El Reno High School	March 3, 2000 (#00000179)	407 S. Choctaw; 35°31′48″N 97°57′14″W	El Reno	
9	El Reno Hotel	El Reno Hotel	March 21, 1979 (#79001988)	300 S. Choctaw St. 35°31′52″N 97°57′17″W	El Reno	
10	El Reno Municipal Swimming Pool Bath House	El Reno Municipal Swimming Pool Bath House	March 30, 2000 (#00000178)	715 S. Morrison; 35°31′32″N 97°57′53″W	El Reno	
11	Fort Reno	Fort Reno	June 22, 1970 (#70000529)	3 miles (4.8 km) west and 2 miles (3.2 km) north of El Reno; 35°33′42″N 98°02′06″W	El Reno	
12	William I. and Magdalen M. Goff House	William I. and Magdalen M. Goff House	September 8, 1988 (#88001317)	506 S. Evans; 35°31′46″N 97°57′21″W	El Reno	
13	Jackson Conoco Service Station	Jackson Conoco Service Station	March 2, 2004 (#04000132)	301 S. Choctaw, (121 W. Wade); 35°31′53″N 97°57′15″W	El Reno	
14	Henry Lassen House	Henry Lassen House	September 4, 2008 (#08000852)	605 S. Hoff; 35°31′41″N 97°56′57″W	El Reno	
15	McGranahan Portion of the Chisholm Trail Roadbed		June 14, 2013 (#13000391)	Address Restricted	Yukon	
16	Meloy House	Meloy House	September 10, 2014 (#14000592)	131 W. Carson Dr. 35°22′53″N 97°43′32″W	Mustang	
17	Mennoville Mennonite Church	Mennoville Mennonite Church	October 4, 1979 (#79001989)	North of El Reno on U.S. Route 81; 35°38′20″N 97°57′33″W	El Reno	
18	Mulvey Mercantile	Mulvey Mercantile	September 20, 1982 (#82003670)	425 W. Main; 35°30′13″N 97°44′36″W	Yukon	
19	Red Cross Canteen	Red Cross Canteen	September 5, 1975 (#75001560)	Rock Island Depot; 35°31′51″N 97°57′30″W	El Reno	
20	Richardson Building	Richardson Building	October 6, 1983 (#83004164)	Northeast of Main and Division; 35°23′11″N 97°56′02″W	Union City	
21	Rock Island Depot	Rock Island Depot	March 7, 1983 (#83002078)	400 W. Wade St. 35°31′52″N 97°57′31″W	El Reno	
22	St. John's Evangelical Lutheran Church		May 30, 2024 (#100010406)	408 Colorado Ave; 35°43′28″N 97°58′48″W	Okarche	
23	Southern Hotel	Southern Hotel	August 2, 1978 (#78002220)	319 S. Grand St. 35°31′50″N 97°57′27″W	El Reno	
24	West Point Christian Church	West Point Christian Church	September 2, 1983 (#83002079)	Southwest of Yukon; 35°26′57″N 97°47′40″W	Yukon	
25	Yukon Public Library	Yukon Public Library	February 2, 1984 (#84002977)	512 Elm St. 35°30′24″N 97°45′02″W	Yukon	

== See also ==
- List of National Historic Landmarks in Oklahoma
- National Register of Historic Places listings in Oklahoma
