= Canadian County, Oklahoma =

County in Oklahoma, United States

- County
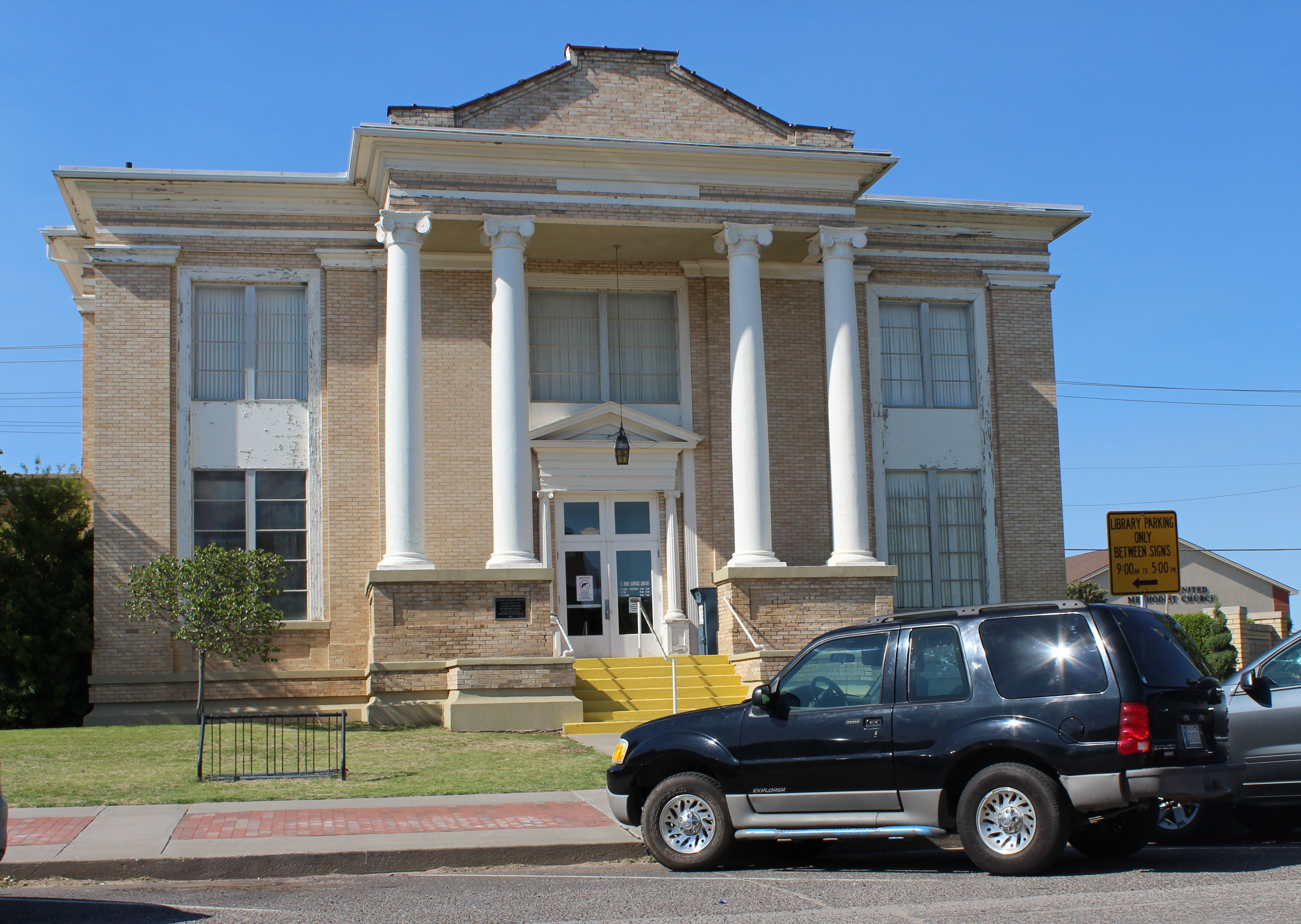
- El Reno Carnegie Library

- Location within the U.S. state of Oklahoma
- Coordinates: 35°32′N 97°59′W
- Country: United States
- State: Oklahoma
- Founded: March, 1890
- Named for: Canadian River
- Seat: El Reno
- Largest city: Yukon (Note: Even though Oklahoma City has a higher population, only a portion of it extends into Canadian County, which makes Yukon the most populous city entirely in the county.)

Area
  - Total: 906 sq mi (2,350 km^{2})
  - Land: 897 sq mi (2,320 km^{2})
  - Water: 9.0 sq mi (23 km^{2}) 1.0%

Population (2020)
  - Total: 154,405
  - Estimate (2025): 187,189 ▲
  - Density: 172/sq mi (66.5/km^{2})
- Time zone: UTC−6 (Central)
  - Summer (DST): UTC−5 (CDT)
- Congressional districts: 3rd, 4th
- Website: www.canadiancounty.org

Canadian County is a county located in the U.S. state of Oklahoma. As of the 2020 census, the population was 154,405, making it the fourth most populous county in Oklahoma. Its county seat is El Reno.

The county is named for the Canadian River, which forms part of its southern border. The river may have been named for early European explorers who were fur traders and trappers from New France, or pre-1763 colonial Canada.

Canadian County is part of the Oklahoma City metropolitan area.

== History ==
In 1859, the United States expelled the Caddo Nation of Louisiana from its Brazos reservation in Texas and relocated it to what would eventually become Canadian County, Oklahoma. Showetat, the last hereditary chief of the Caddo, set up his camp here and is considered Canadian County's first permanent resident. (Union City developed near his camp site.)

The federal government relocated the Wichita tribe to this same part of Indian Territory in 1861. By the Treaty of Medicine Lodge, the United States assigned the land west of the Caddo and Wichita to the Cheyenne and Arapaho tribes. They were relocated from Colorado in 1869. The Cheyenne-Arapaho Agency (later renamed the Darlington Agency) was established in 1870.

Canadian County was formed in 1889 as County Four of Oklahoma Territory as part of the Oklahoma Organic Act, which created Oklahoma Territory from part of Indian Territory. It was named after the Canadian River, which runs through the county.

This county was settled by European-Americans after the April 22, 1889, land run, which gave away expropriated Native American land. It was expanded by a second land run in 1892. In 1902, after distribution of communal lands among households of the Cheyenne and Arapaho, their 'surplus' lands were opened to European-American settlement. El Reno was chosen as the county seat over competitors Reno City, Frisco, and Canadian City.

The county was the location of the last great battle of the Cheyenne and Arapaho against United States Army forces.

== Geography ==
According to the U.S. Census Bureau, the county has a total area of 906 square miles (2,350 km^{2}), of which 897 square miles (2,320 km^{2}) is land and 9.0 square miles (23 km^{2}) (1.0%) is water. The county lies mostly within the Red Bed Plains, a subregion of the Osage Plains physiographic region. Its northwestern corner is in the Gypsum Hills. The county is drained by the North Canadian River and the Canadian River, which both flow through the county from northwest to southeast.

According to a study published by the Oklahoma Geological Survey, the North Canadian River drains about 40 percent of the county, the Canadian River drains about 32 percent, and the Cimarron River drains about 27 percent (mostly in the northeastern part of the county). About 1 percent of the county is drained by Sugar Creek, which empties into the Washita River, itself a tributary of the Red River.

The North Canadian River enters Canadian County near the northwest corner, flows generally southeast towards the middle of the county, then turns southward to leave the county about 8 miles (13 km) north of the southeastern corner. The river length is about 76 miles (122 km). The elevation drops from 1,420 feet (430 m) at the entry to about 1,200 feet (370 m) at the exit. Its named tributaries are Sixmile Creek, Fourmile Creek, Purcell Creek, Shell Creek, and Mustang Creek.

The Canadian River enters the western border of the county about 11 miles (18 km) north of the southwest corner at an elevation of 1,370 feet (420 m) and flows southeast about 16 miles (26 km), where it becomes the southern border of the county. Its course within the county is 45 miles (72 km) long, and the elevation where it leaves the county is 1,150 feet (350 m). Named tributaries include Dry Creek and Boggy Creek.

The Cimarron River does not flow through the county, but drains part of the northeastern area via its tributaries: Kingfisher, Dead Indian, Uncle John, Cottonwood, Soldier, and Deer creeks. The Washita River flows more than 20 miles (32 km) south of the county, but drains about 5 square miles (13 km^{2}) in the southwest corner of Canadian County.

=== Adjacent counties ===
- Kingfisher County (north)
- Logan County (northeast)
- Oklahoma County (east)
- Cleveland County (southeast)
- Grady County (south)
- Caddo County (southwest)
- Blaine County (northwest)

== Demographics ==
Historical population
Census	Pop.	Note	%±
1890	7,158		—
1900	15,981		123.3%
1910	23,501		47.1%
1920	22,288		−5.2%
1930	28,115		26.1%
1940	27,329		−2.8%
1950	25,644		−6.2%
1960	24,727		−3.6%
1970	32,245		30.4%
1980	56,452		75.1%
1990	74,409		31.8%
2000	87,697		17.9%
2010	115,541		31.8%
2020	154,405		33.6%
2025 (est.)	187,189	▲	21.2%
U.S. Decennial Census; 1790–1960 1900–1990; 1990–2000 2010

=== 2020 census ===
As of the 2020 United States census, the county had a population of 154,405. Of the residents, 27.0% were under the age of 18 and 13.5% were 65 years of age or older; the median age was 35.9 years. For every 100 females there were 97.7 males, and for every 100 females age 18 and over there were 95.9 males.

The racial makeup of the county was 72.9% White, 3.5% Black or African American, 4.5% American Indian and Alaska Native, 3.1% Asian, 4.0% from some other race, and 11.9% from two or more races. Hispanic or Latino residents of any race comprised 10.6% of the population.

There were 56,361 households in the county, of which 38.6% had children under the age of 18 living with them and 22.2% had a female householder with no spouse or partner present. About 21.7% of all households were made up of individuals and 8.8% had someone living alone who was 65 years of age or older.

There were 60,434 housing units, of which 6.7% were vacant. Among occupied housing units, 74.4% were owner-occupied and 25.6% were renter-occupied. The homeowner vacancy rate was 2.0% and the rental vacancy rate was 10.0%.

By 2021 estimates, there were 54,871 households in the county.

In 2021, its median household income was $76,973 with a poverty rate of 8.2%.

=== 2000 census ===
As of the census of 2000, there were 87,697 people, 31,484 households, and 24,431 families residing in the county. The population density was 98 inhabitants per square mile (38/km^{2}). There were 33,969 housing units at an average density of 38 units per square mile (15 units/km^{2}). The racial makeup of the county was 87.01% White, 2.16% Black or African American, 4.27% Native American, 2.45% Asian, 0.05% Pacific Islander, 1.35% from other races, and 2.72% from two or more races. 3.86% of the population were Hispanic or Latino of any race.

As of 2000, there were 31,484 households, out of which 39.80% had children under the age of 18 living with them, 64.30% were married couples living together, 9.70% had a female householder with no husband present, and 22.40% were non-families. 19.20% of all households were made up of individuals, and 7.10% had someone living alone who was 65 years of age or older. The average household size was 2.71 and the average family size was 3.10. In the county, the population was spread out, with 28.00% under the age of 18, 8.20% from 18 to 24, 30.70% from 25 to 44, 23.50% from 45 to 64, and 9.50% who were 65 years of age or older. The median age was 35 years. For every 100 females, there were 99.40 males. For every 100 females age 18 and over, there were 97.70 males.

In 2000, the median income for a household in the county was $45,439, and the median income for a family was $51,180. Males had a median income of $35,944 versus $24,631 for females. The per capita income for the county was $19,691. About 5.80% of families and 7.90% of the population were below the poverty line, including 9.70% of those under age 18 and 7.20% of those age 65 or over.

== Politics ==
Voter Registration and Party Enrollment as of January 15, 2024
Party	Number of Voters	Percentage
Republican	58,711	59.24%
Democratic	19,974	20.15%
Libertarian	1,139	1.15%
Unaffiliated	19,284	19.46%
Total	99,108	100%

United States presidential election results for Canadian County, Oklahoma
Year	Republican		Democratic		Third party(ies)	
Year	No.	%	No.	%	No.	%
1908	1,931	45.77%	2,124	50.34%	164	3.89%
1912	1,794	42.49%	2,047	48.48%	381	9.02%
1916	1,590	37.33%	2,200	51.66%	469	11.01%
1920	3,881	52.14%	3,268	43.90%	295	3.96%
1924	3,070	41.50%	3,065	41.44%	1,262	17.06%
1928	5,011	63.63%	2,786	35.38%	78	0.99%
1932	2,549	27.36%	6,767	72.64%	0	0.00%
1936	3,325	34.97%	6,135	64.52%	48	0.50%
1940	4,699	45.90%	5,506	53.79%	32	0.31%
1944	4,674	49.24%	4,800	50.57%	18	0.19%
1948	3,729	40.11%	5,568	59.89%	0	0.00%
1952	7,289	63.43%	4,203	36.57%	0	0.00%
1956	5,702	59.41%	3,896	40.59%	0	0.00%
1960	5,697	57.37%	4,234	42.63%	0	0.00%
1964	5,193	47.47%	5,747	52.53%	0	0.00%
1968	5,891	49.12%	3,577	29.83%	2,525	21.05%
1972	11,400	78.28%	2,751	18.89%	413	2.84%
1976	9,766	56.32%	7,288	42.03%	285	1.64%
1980	15,272	72.58%	4,889	23.24%	880	4.18%
1984	20,929	79.52%	5,245	19.93%	146	0.55%
1988	17,872	70.00%	7,453	29.19%	205	0.80%
1992	16,756	50.70%	7,215	21.83%	9,079	27.47%
1996	18,139	59.40%	8,977	29.40%	3,420	11.20%
2000	22,679	72.32%	8,367	26.68%	314	1.00%
2004	33,297	77.42%	9,712	22.58%	0	0.00%
2008	36,428	76.12%	11,426	23.88%	0	0.00%
2012	35,625	77.17%	10,537	22.83%	0	0.00%
2016	39,986	72.34%	11,674	21.12%	3,618	6.55%
2020	43,550	70.31%	16,742	27.03%	1,648	2.66%
2024	50,551	69.18%	21,038	28.79%	1,485	2.03%

== Government and infrastructure ==
The Federal Bureau of Prisons operates the Federal Correctional Institution, El Reno in El Reno, Canadian County.

== Economy ==
Agriculture has been a mainstay of the economy since the beginning of non-Indigenous settlement in the late 1800s.

== Transportation ==
=== Major highways ===
- I-40
  - I-40 BL (El Reno)
- I-344 / Kilpatrick Turnpike
- US 81
- US 270
- US 281
  - US 281 Spur
- SH-3
- SH-4
- SH-8
- SH-37
- SH-66
- SH-92
- SH-152

=== Airports ===
- Clarence E. Page Municipal Airport is a public use airport located in Canadian County, 15 nautical miles (28 km) west of the central business district of Oklahoma City, which also owns this airport.
- Sundance Airpark is a public use airport located in Canadian County, 11 nautical miles (20 km) northwest of the central business district of Oklahoma City. This airport is privately owned.
- El Reno Regional Airport, El Reno, OK

== Communities ==
=== Cities ===
- El Reno (county seat)
- Geary (partly in Blaine County)
- Mustang
- Oklahoma City (mostly in Oklahoma County)
- Piedmont (partly in Kingfisher County)
- Yukon

=== Towns ===
- Calumet
- Okarche (partly in Kingfisher County)
- Union City

=== Census-designated place ===
- Cedar Lake

=== Other unincorporated communities ===
- Four Counties Corner (formerly Lockridge)
- Scott (partly in Caddo County)

== Education ==
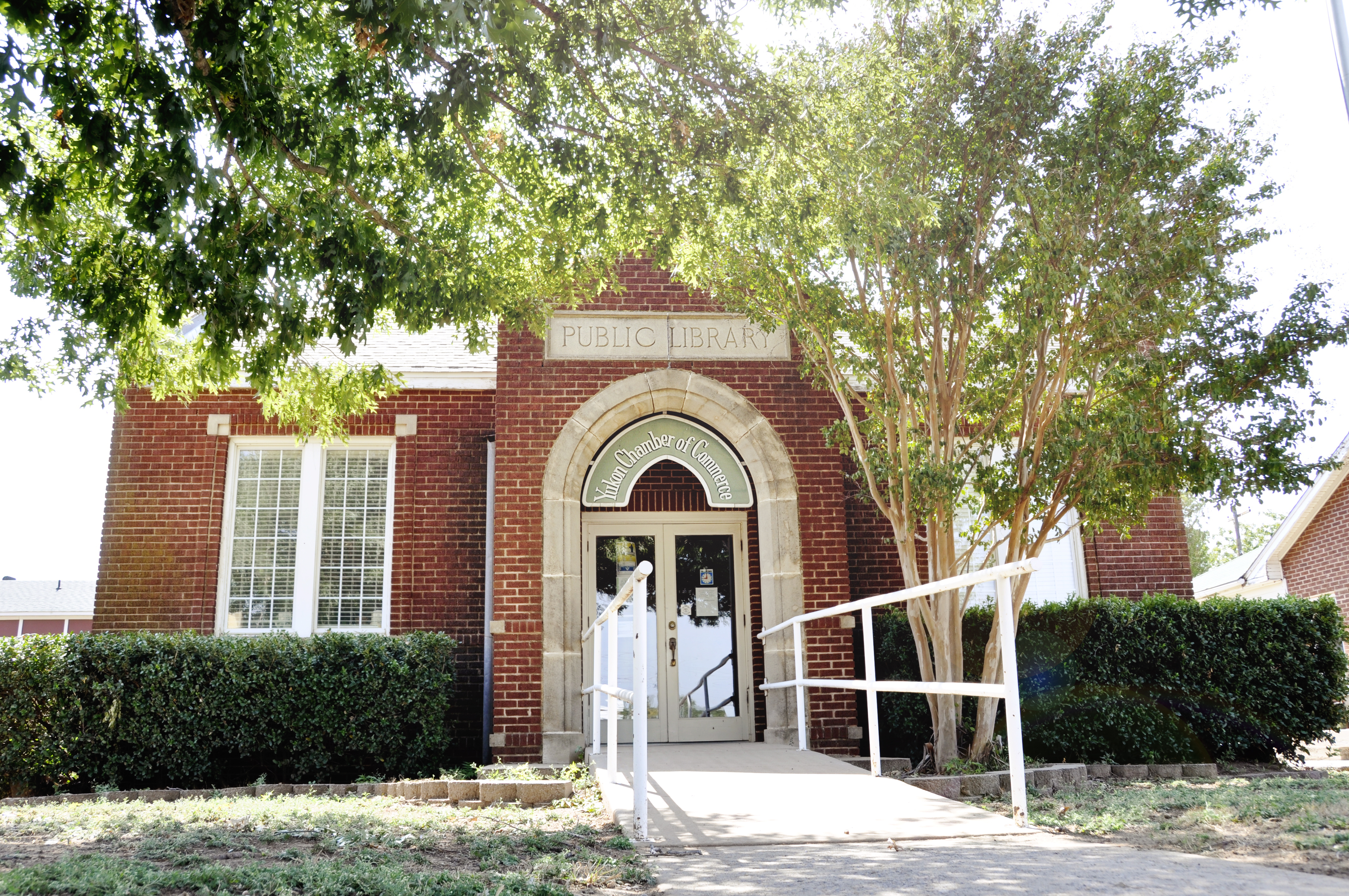
Old Yukon Public Library

School districts include:

K-12:

- Calumet Public Schools
- Cashion Public Schools
- Deer Creek Public Schools
- El Reno Public Schools
- Geary Public Schools
- Hinton Public Schools
- Lookeba-Sickles Public Schools
- Minco Public Schools
- Mustang Public Schools
- Okarche Public Schools
- Piedmont Public Schools
- Union City Public Schools
- Yukon Public Schools

Elementary:

- Banner Public School
- Darlington Public School
- Maple Public School
- Riverside Public School

== NRHP sites ==
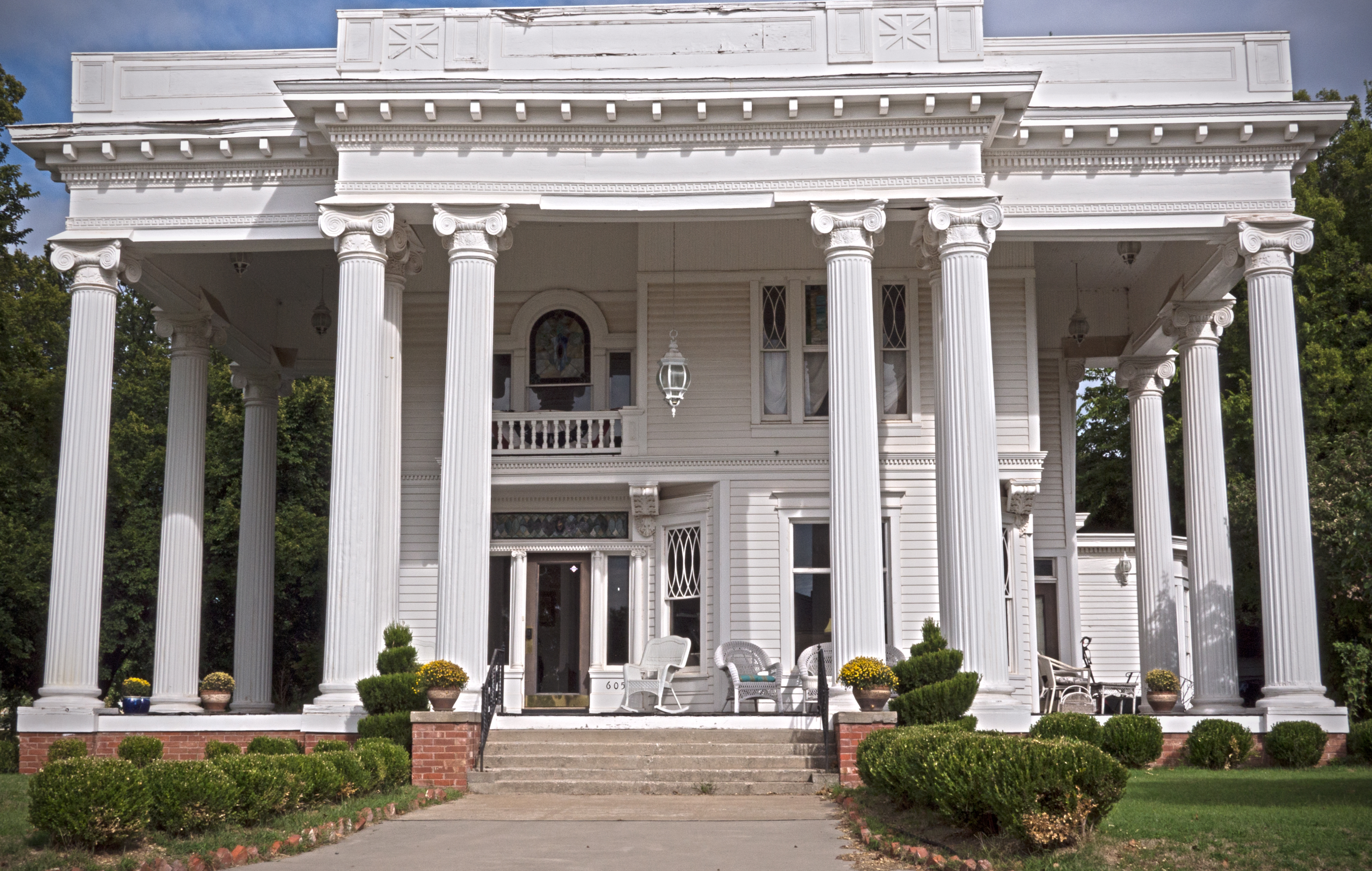
Henry Lassen House in El Reno

The following sites in Canadian County are listed on the National Register of Historic Places:

- Avant's Cities Service Station, El Reno
- Bridgeport Hill Service Station, Geary
- Bridgeport Hill-Hydro Route 66 Segment, Hydro
- Canadian County Jail, El Reno
- Carnegie Library, El Reno
- Czech Hall, Yukon
- Darlington Agency Site, El Reno
- El Reno High School, El Reno
- El Reno Hotel, El Reno
- El Reno Municipal Swimming Pool Bath House, El Reno
- Fort Reno, El Reno
- William I. and Magdalen M. Goff House, El Reno
- Jackson Conoco Service Station, El Reno
- Henry Lassen House, El Reno
- McGranahan Portion of the Chisholm Trail Roadbed, Yukon vicinity
- Meloy House, Mustang
- Mennoville Mennonite Church, El Reno
- Mulvey Mercantile, Yukon
- Red Cross Canteen, El Reno
- Richardson Building, Union City
- Rock Island Depot, El Reno
- Southern Hotel, El Reno
- West Point Christian Church, Yukon
- Yukon Public Library, Yukon
