= Cedar Lake, Oklahoma =

Unincorporated community in Oklahoma, US

- Census-designated place
- Location within Oklahoma Location within the United States
- Coordinates: 35°25′39″N 98°11′35″W
- Country: United States
- State: Oklahoma
- County: Canadian

Area
  - Total: 0.95 sq mi (2.45 km^{2})
  - Land: 0.86 sq mi (2.24 km^{2})
  - Water: 0.081 sq mi (0.21 km^{2})
- Elevation: 1,447 ft (441 m)

Population (2020)
  - Total: 404
  - Density: 466.4/sq mi (180.09/km^{2})
- Time zone: UTC-6 (Central (CST))
  - Summer (DST): UTC-5 (CDT)
- ZIP Code: 73047 (Hinton)
- Area codes: 405/572
- FIPS code: 40-12937
- GNIS feature ID: 2806999

Cedar Lake is an unincorporated community and census-designated place (CDP) in Canadian County, Oklahoma, United States. It was first listed as a CDP prior to the 2020 census. As of the 2020 census, Cedar Lake had a population of 404.

The CDP is in southwestern Canadian County, built around Cedar Lake, a reservoir. It is 12 miles (19 km) southeast of Hinton, 21 miles (34 km) southwest of El Reno, and 45 miles (72 km) west of Oklahoma City.

== Demographics ==
=== 2020 census ===
As of the 2020 census, Cedar Lake had a population of 404. The median age was 51.3 years. 17.8% of residents were under the age of 18 and 25.5% of residents were 65 years of age or older. For every 100 females there were 125.7 males, and for every 100 females age 18 and over there were 114.2 males age 18 and over.

0.0% of residents lived in urban areas, while 100.0% lived in rural areas.

There were 189 households in Cedar Lake, of which 25.9% had children under the age of 18 living in them. Of all households, 52.9% were married-couple households, 28.6% were households with a male householder and no spouse or partner present, and 12.2% were households with a female householder and no spouse or partner present. About 29.6% of all households were made up of individuals and 14.9% had someone living alone who was 65 years of age or older.

There were 376 housing units, of which 49.7% were vacant. The homeowner vacancy rate was 6.3% and the rental vacancy rate was 45.7%.

Racial composition as of the 2020 census
| Race | Number | Percent |
|---|---|---|
| White | 325 | 80.4% |
| Black or African American | 4 | 1.0% |
| American Indian and Alaska Native | 18 | 4.5% |
| Asian | 6 | 1.5% |
| Native Hawaiian and Other Pacific Islander | 1 | 0.2% |
| Some other race | 7 | 1.7% |
| Two or more races | 43 | 10.6% |
| Hispanic or Latino (of any race) | 17 | 4.2% |
