= Federal Correctional Institution, El Reno =

Medium-security prison in Oklahoma, US

Coordinates: 35°32′05″N 98°00′26″W

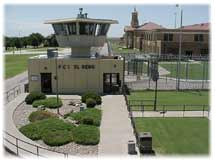
- Interactive map of Federal Correctional Institution, El Reno
- Location: El Reno, Canadian County, Oklahoma
- Status: Operational
- Security class: Medium-security (with minimum-security prison camp)
- Population: 1,000 (265 in prison camp)
- Managed by: Federal Bureau of Prisons

Federal Correctional Institution, El Reno (FCI El Reno) is a medium-security United States federal prison for male inmates in Oklahoma. It is operated by the Federal Bureau of Prisons (BOP), a division of the United States Department of Justice. The facility has an adjacent satellite camp for minimum-security male offenders.

It has one of two remaining farm facilities in the BOP.

FCI El Reno is located in central Oklahoma, 30 miles west of Oklahoma City.

== History ==
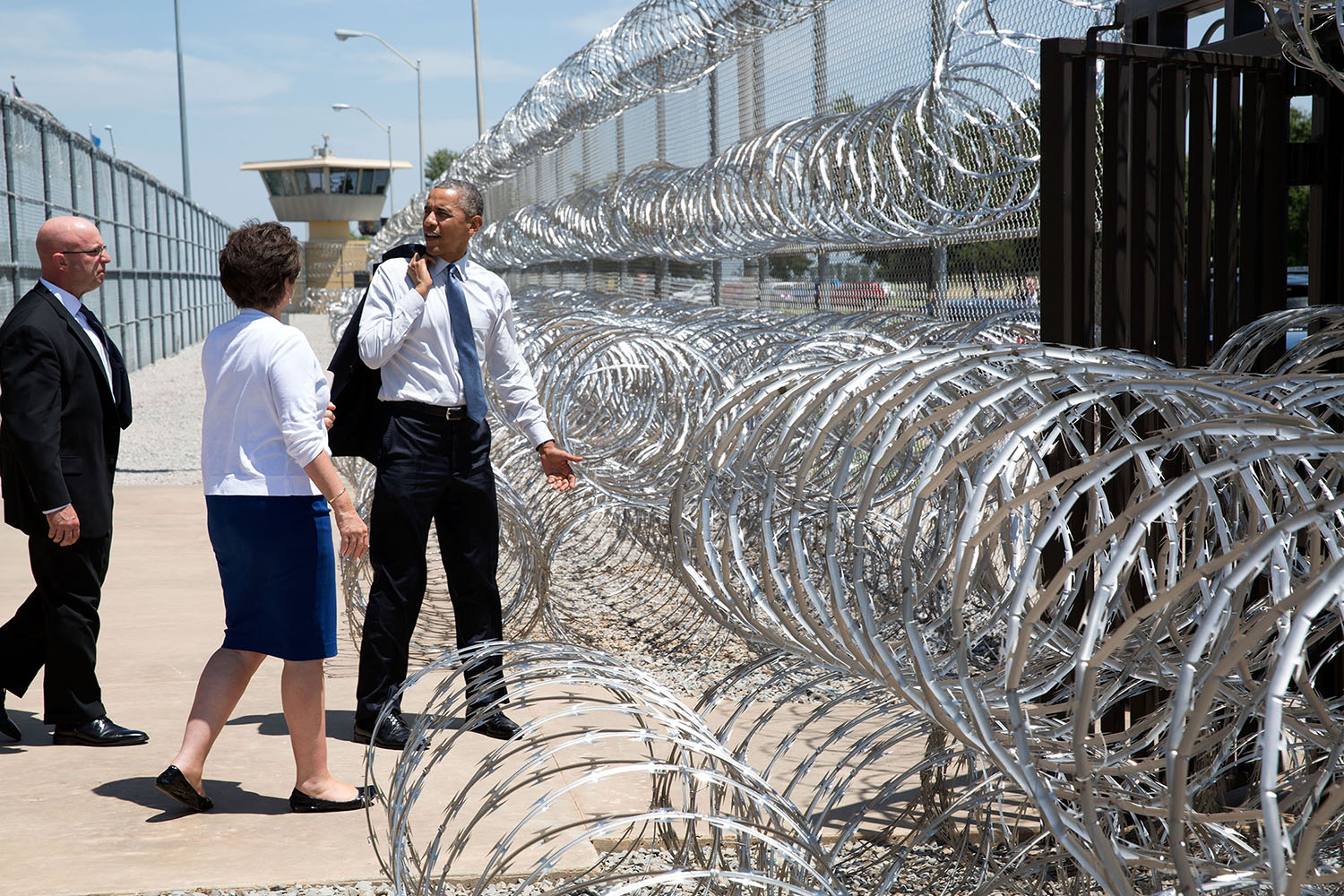

Barack Obama visits FCI El Reno in 2015, the first American president to visit a federal prison.

The El Reno Reformatory was originally named the United States Southwestern Reformatory (abbreviated U.S.S.R.) when it opened April 4, 1933, to receive inmates transferred from USP Leavenworth, Kansas; the Federal Reformatory at Chillicothe, Ohio; and the Federal Prison Camp at Fort Riley, Kansas. In 1938, it was renamed the Federal Reformatory, El Reno, Oklahoma. It developed into a Federal Correctional Institution (FCI) for young adults (ages 18 – 26) who needed to be in a medium security facility. In the late 1970s, it began receiving medium-security prisoners of all ages.

FCI El Reno was established to house younger prisoners. President Barack Obama visited FCI El Reno on July 16, 2015. This was the first time a sitting president has ever visited a federal prison.

== Notable incidents ==
On December 19, 2004, inmate Carlos Brewster escaped from the minimum-security prison camp at FCI El Reno. A fugitive task force led by the US Marshals Service apprehended Brewster three weeks later at a fast-food restaurant in East Los Angeles, California. Brewster was returned to Oklahoma. Additional time was added to the 21-year sentence he was serving for possession with intent to distribute cocaine.

In August 2011, inmate Joe Villarreal escaped from FCI El Reno, where he was serving a 147-month sentence for drug trafficking. He was apprehended in the city of El Reno several hours later. Villarreal was subsequently sentenced to an additional 46 months in prison for the escape and for possessing a shank in the prison prior to his escape.

Brewster and Villarreal were transferred to facilities with higher security levels.

== Notable inmates ==
Inmate Name	Register Number	Photo	Status	Details
Christopher Faulkner	76501-112		Sentenced to FCI for fraud and tax evasion; scheduled for release in 2030 and is not eligible for parole.	Texas oil-and-gas mogul who was sentenced to 15 years in federal prison for bilking investors out of millions of dollars and concealing money from the IRS.
Joel Lopez Sr.	20142-079		Serving a life sentence.	Drug trafficker; convicted in 2009 of attempting to hire a member of the Latin Kings gang to kidnap and murder US District Judge Ricardo Hinojosa in retaliation for Hinojosa sentencing him to life in prison in 2006.
Diego Montoya Sanchez	04171-748		Scheduled for release in 2045; now at FCI Petersburg.	Former leader of the Norte del Valle drug cartel in Colombia, which shipped $10 billion worth of cocaine into the US from 1995 to 2007; connected to over 1,500 murders; extradited from Colombian authorities in 2007; formerly on the FBI Ten Most Wanted Fugitives List.
Lontrell Williams Jr.	52490-509		Sentenced to 63 months in prison; scheduled for release in 2027.	Memphis rapper known as Pooh Shiesty; pleaded guilty to a firearms conspiracy charge related to an October 2020 shooting incident in Bay Harbor Islands, Florida.
Jon Woods	14657-010		Sentenced to 220 months; scheduled for release in 2033. Now at FCI Bastrop.	Arkansas state senator from 2013 to 2017; found guilty of conspiracy to commit mail fraud, twelve counts of wire fraud, and money laundering. Woods was accused of soliciting and accepting kickbacks for the distribution of government fund.
Chuck Zito	12032-054		Served a portion of a ten-year drug conspiracy sentence at FCI El Reno in 1990	President of the New York Nomads chapter of the Hells Angels; pleaded guilty to conspiracy to distribute methamphetamine in 1986

== See also ==
- List of U.S. federal prisons
- Federal Bureau of Prisons
- Incarceration in the United States
