= Red Cross Canteen =

- U.S. National Register of Historic Places
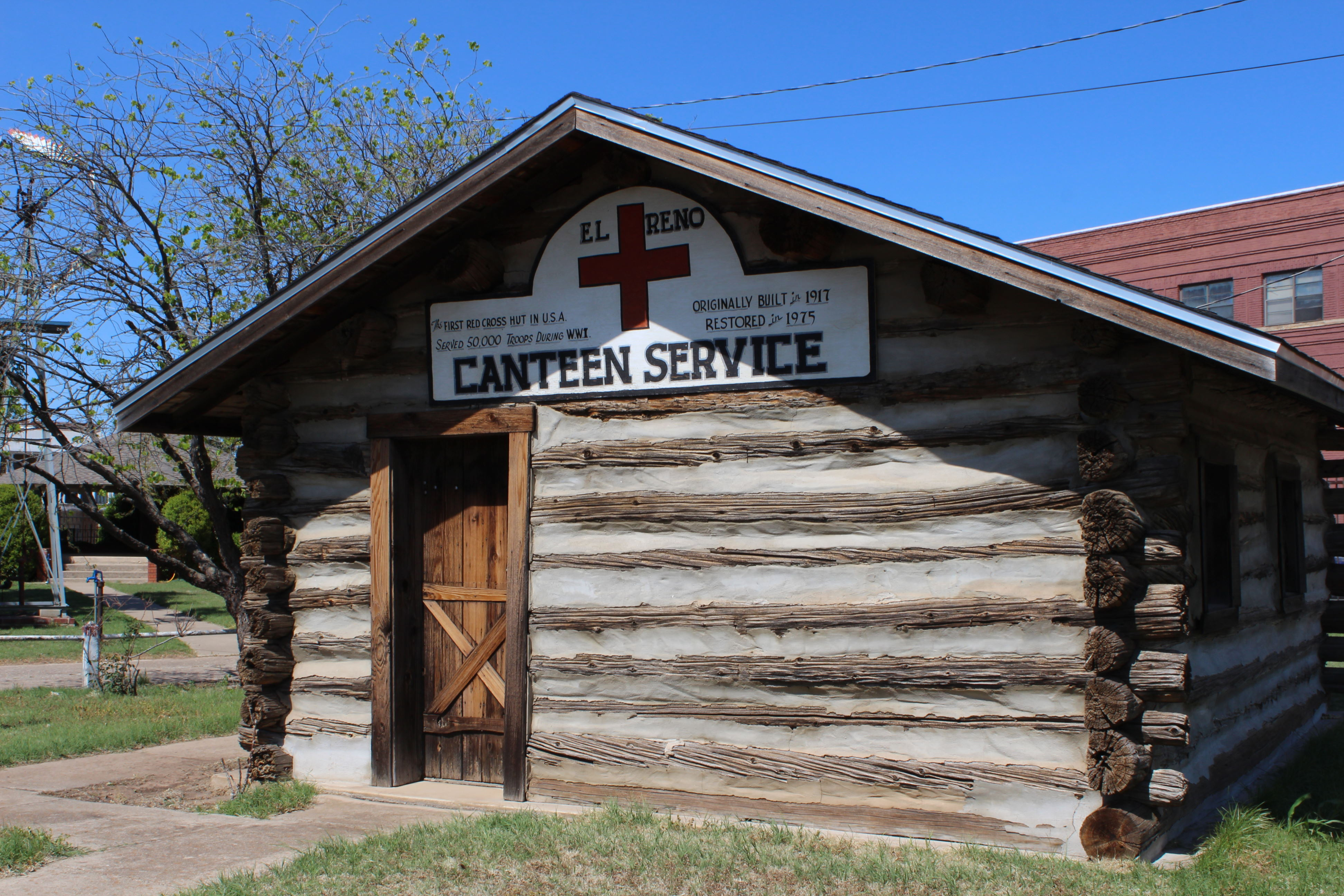

- Location within Oklahoma Location within the United States
- Location: Grand Ave. and London St. El Reno, Oklahoma
- Coordinates: 35°31′51″N 97°57′31″W
- Area: less than one acre
- Built: 1918
- NRHP reference No.: 75001560
- Added to NRHP: September 5, 1975

The Red Cross Canteen in El Reno, Oklahoma is a small wooden structure located east of the Rock Island Depot. Built by volunteer labor with telegraph poles donated by the Rock Island Railroad, the facility opened on August 1, 1918, just south of the railroad station as an American Red Cross commissary to serve troop trains that stopped in El Reno during World War I.

After the end of the war, the building was moved to Legion Park, where it served as a Boy Scout cabin for many years. After falling into disrepair during the 1960s, the building was moved back near its original location and restored as a Bicentennial project in 1975. It currently contains exhibits and memorabilia from the World War I era as well as historical information about the county's Red Cross chapter.
