= El Reno Hotel =

- U.S. National Register of Historic Places
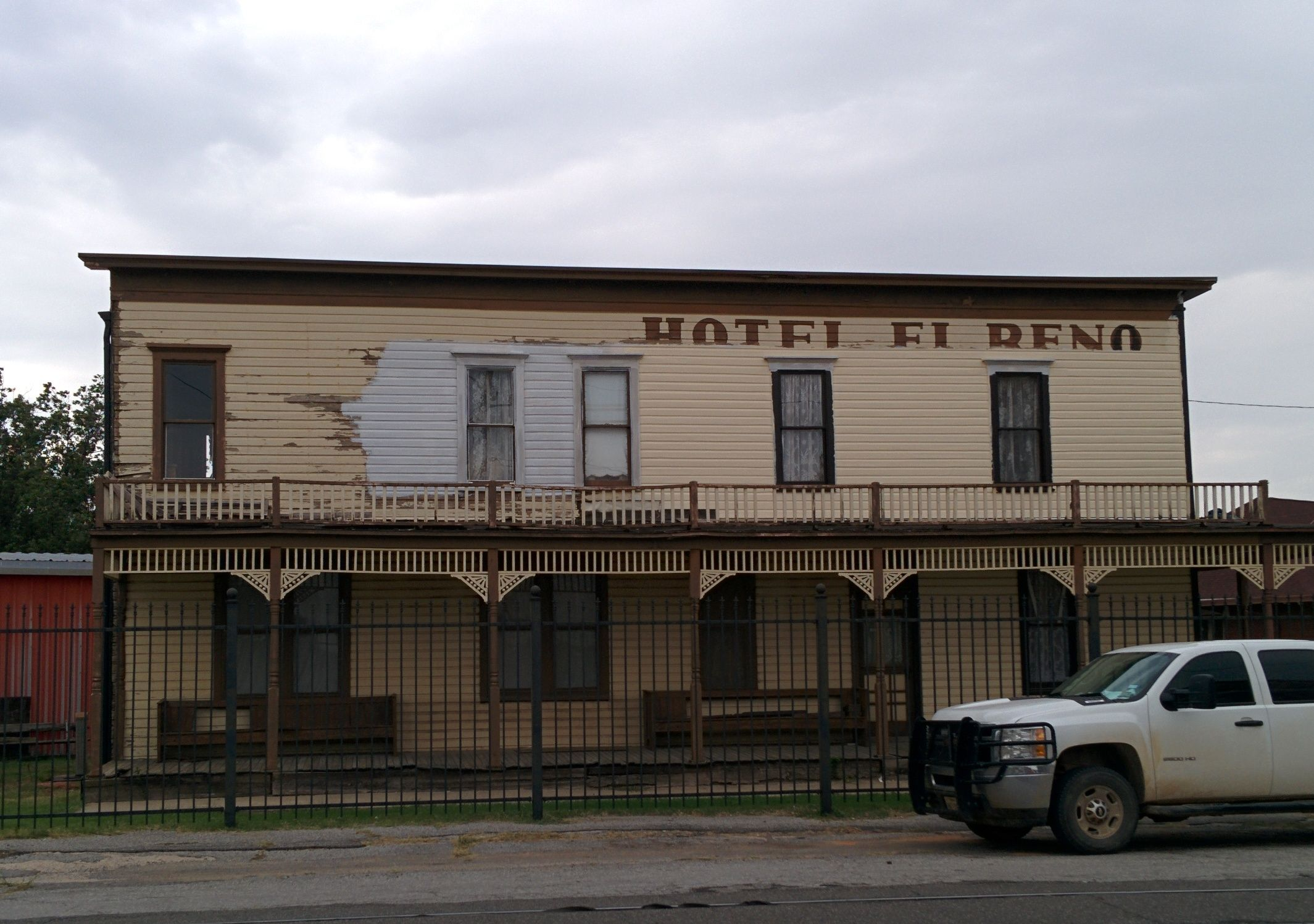

- Location within Oklahoma Location within the United States
- Location: 400 W. Wade St., El Reno, Oklahoma
- Coordinates: 35.53114°N 97.95496°W
- Area: less than one acre
- Built: 1892
- NRHP reference No.: 79001988
- Added to NRHP: March 21, 1979

The El Reno Hotel is a two-story, wood-frame, Folk Victorian structure in El Reno, Oklahoma. It is the oldest surviving commercial building in the city.

Listed on the National Register of Historic Places in 1979, it was built in 1892 at 300 South Choctaw, in the city's business district, by John Kossuth. It was purchased by Mr. and Mrs. H. M. Foster in 1901 and operated as a hotel until 1975, when it closed and fell into disrepair.

In 1984, the building was donated to the Canadian County Historic Society and was moved to its present location near the Rock Island Depot.
