= McGranahan Portion of the Chisholm Trail Roadbed =

- U.S. National Register of Historic Places
- Location: private land near Yukon, Oklahoma
- Built: 1861-1895
- NRHP reference No.: 13000391
- Added to NRHP: June 14, 2013

The McGranahan Portion of the Chisholm Trail Roadbed is a remnant of the Chisholm Trail, a cattle trail that ran north–south between Texas and Kansas through the Indian Territory. It is the only portion of the Chisholm Trail through Oklahoma listed on the National Register.

The remnant is located near Yukon, Oklahoma, in northeastern Canadian County, and was listed on the National Register of Historic Places in 2013. It is roughly 1.5 miles (2.4 km) east of the historically documented route of the Chisholm Trail. It was most likely used for supporting wagon traffic for the cattle drives.

Much of the land that composed the Chisholm Trail was homesteaded and evidence of the millions of head of cattle driven over the route was lost. However, this piece of land survived and was preserved. James McGranahan purchased it in 1895 and the McGranahan family continues to own it.
