= Meloy House =

- U.S. National Register of Historic Places
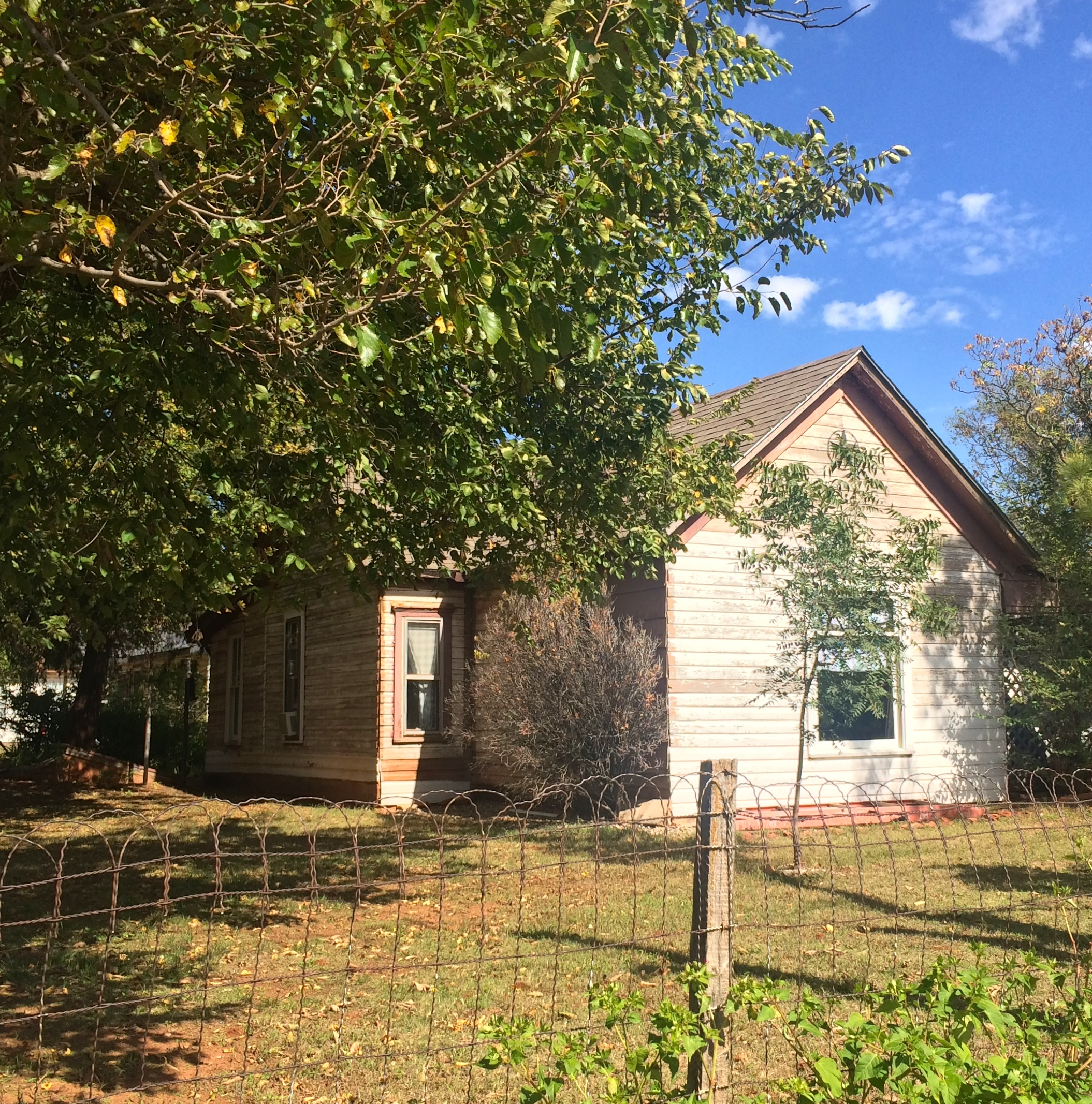
- The Meloy House in 2014

- Location within Oklahoma Location within the United States
- Location: 131 W. Carson Dr., Mustang, Oklahoma
- Coordinates: 35.381554°N 97.725634°W
- Area: less than one acre
- Built: 1902
- NRHP reference No.: 14000592
- Added to NRHP: September 10, 2014

The Meloy House is a single-story wood-frame residential structure located in Mustang, Oklahoma. The house was built sometime around 1902 and is located one block from the original downtown center of the city. It is the only remaining structure from the founding of Mustang that has historical integrity.

As a first-generation house typical of homes of the era in Canadian County, it was listed on the National Register of Historic Places in 2014.
