= William I. and Magdalen M. Goff House =

- U.S. National Register of Historic Places
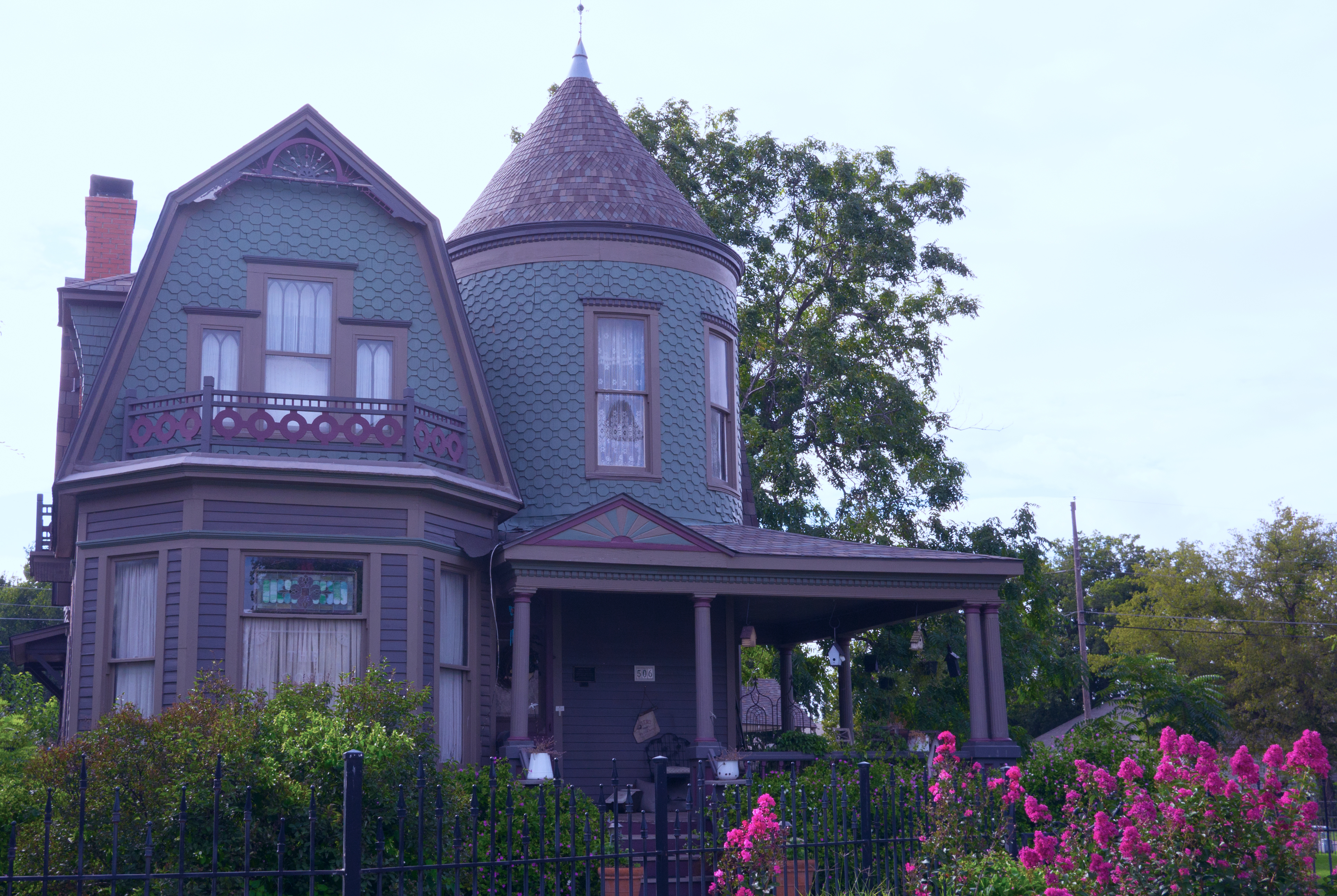

- Location within Oklahoma Location within the United States
- Location: 506 South Evans, El Reno, Oklahoma
- Coordinates: 35°31′46″N 97°57′21″W
- Area: one-half acre
- Built: 1901
- NRHP reference No.: 88001317
- Added to NRHP: July 20, 1988

The William I. and Magdalen M. Goff House, also known as the Goff House, is a residential structure in El Reno, Oklahoma. Listed on the National Register of Historic Places in 1988, it was built in 1901 and is a landmark in the city of El Reno. It has undergone very few exterior changes since its construction before statehood.

The two-story, Colonial Revival-style house has a circular tower and wraparound porch characteristic of Queen Anne style architecture.
