= Southern Hotel (El Reno, Oklahoma) =

- U.S. National Register of Historic Places
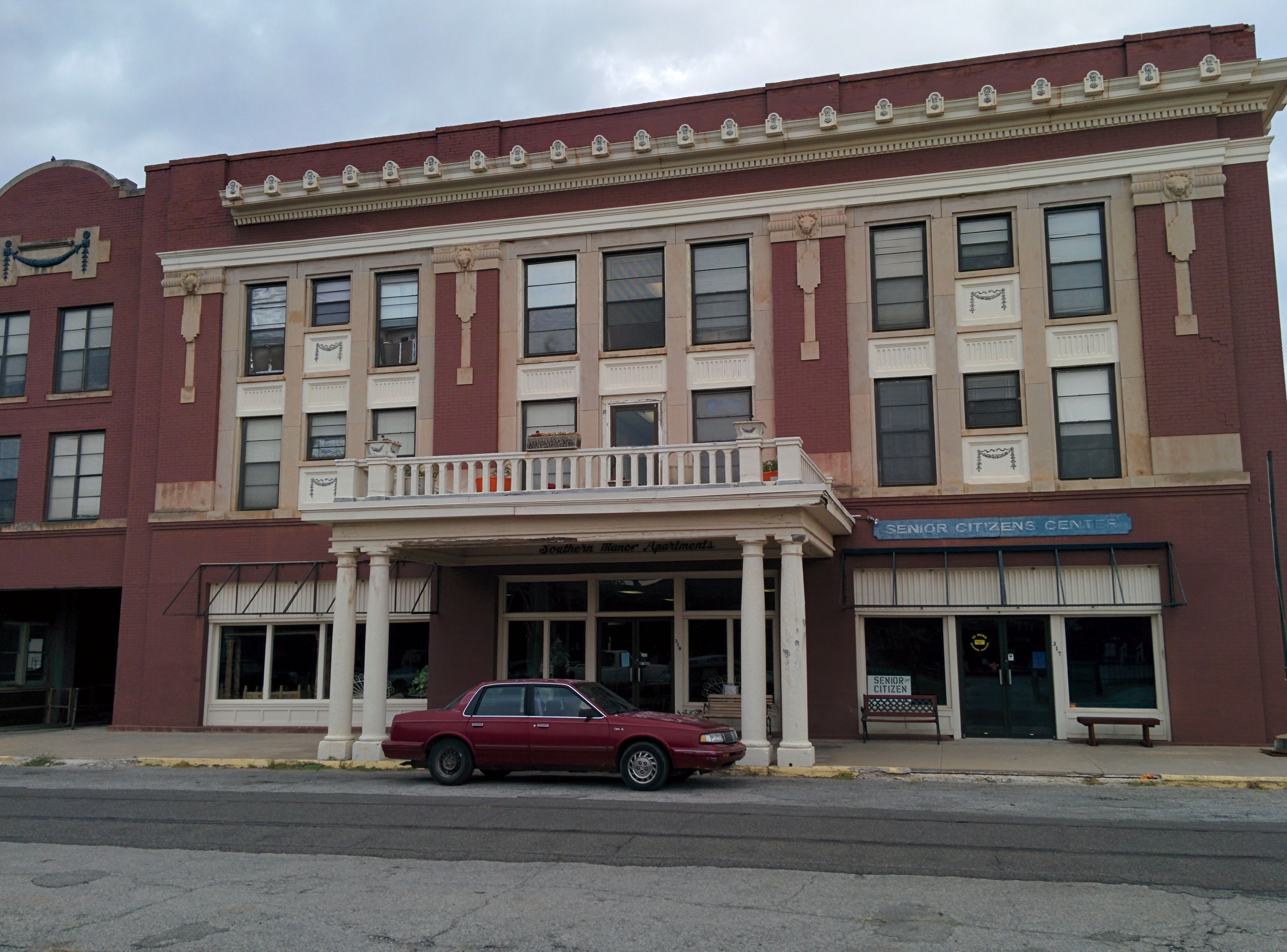

- Location within Oklahoma Location within the United States
- Location: 319 South Grand, El Reno, Oklahoma
- Coordinates: 35°31′50″N 97°57′27″W
- Area: one acre
- Built: 1909
- NRHP reference No.: 78002220
- Added to NRHP: August 2, 1978

The Southern Hotel is a three-story Classical Revival structure located in El Reno, Oklahoma. Listed on the National Register of Historic Places in 1978, the building was constructed in 1909 as a hotel for passengers traveling the Rock Island Railroad as well as travelers along the Oklahoma Railway Company's interurban line to Oklahoma City. When it was built, the Southern Hotel was one of the most opulent and extravagant hotels in Oklahoma.

After railroad passenger travel was discontinued through El Reno in 1967, the hotel began to be neglected. It went through a series of owners and remained structurally sound but in disrepair. The building was restored in the 1980s; it is used for apartments and small offices, and has been the home of the El Reno Senior Citizens Center for several decades.
