= Richardson Building (Union City, Oklahoma) =

- U.S. National Register of Historic Places
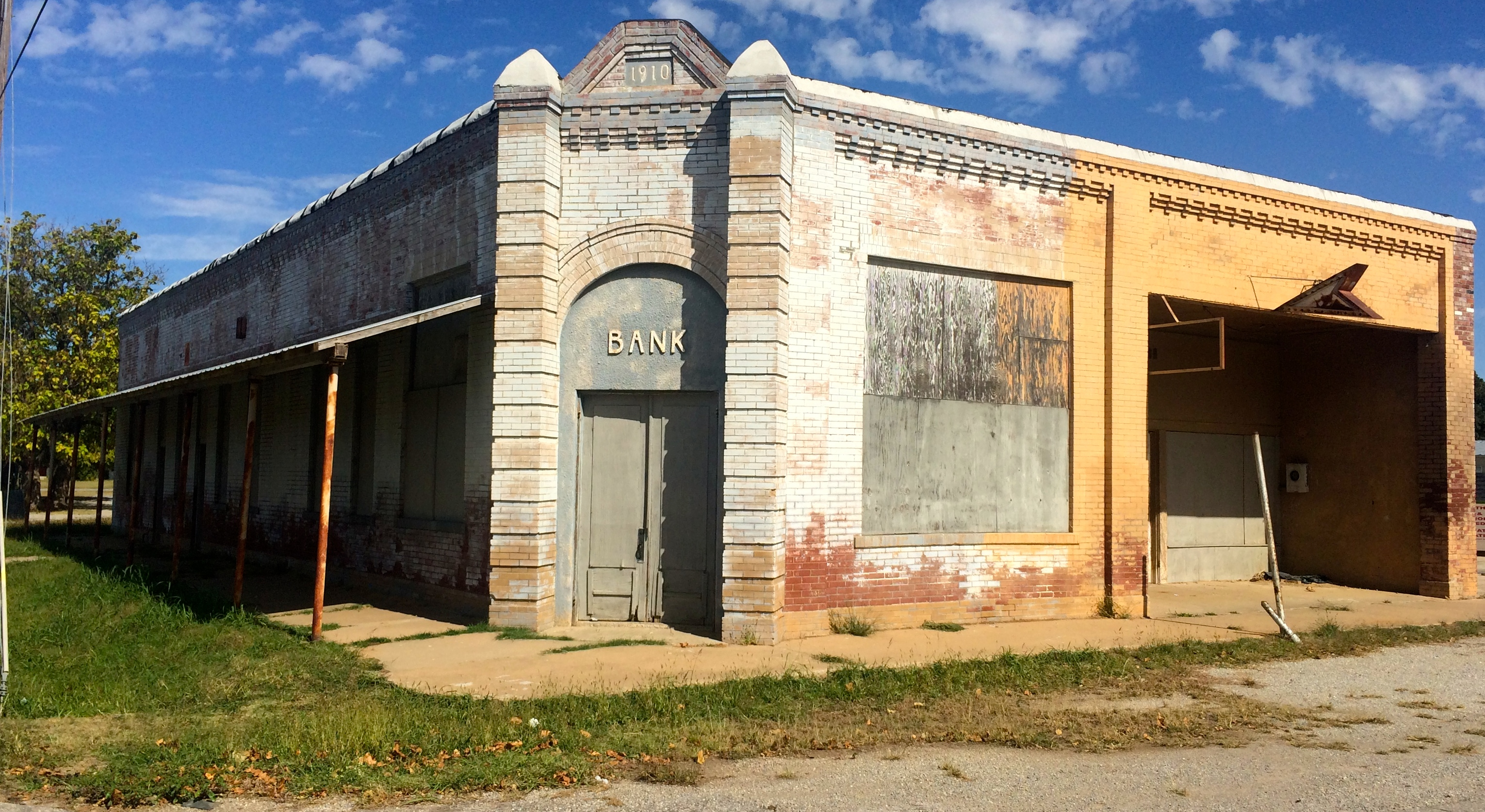
- Richardson Building in 2004

- Location within Oklahoma Location within the United States
- Location: NE of Main and Division, Union City, Oklahoma
- Coordinates: 35°23′11″N 97°56′2″W
- Area: less than one acre
- Built: 1910
- Architect: Richardson, D.
- NRHP reference No.: 83004164
- Added to NRHP: October 6, 1983

The Richardson Building is a commercial structure located in Union City, Oklahoma. Constructed in 1910 as a bank building, it was listed on the National Register of Historic Places in 1983.

The building was a center of commerce for the town of 300 people. A fire destroyed the interior of the structure in 1928, but the roof was replaced and the building was restored. The Bank of Union moved its operations to a new building in 1977, and the Richardson Building fell into disrepair.
