= Union City, Oklahoma =

Town in Oklahoma, US

- Town
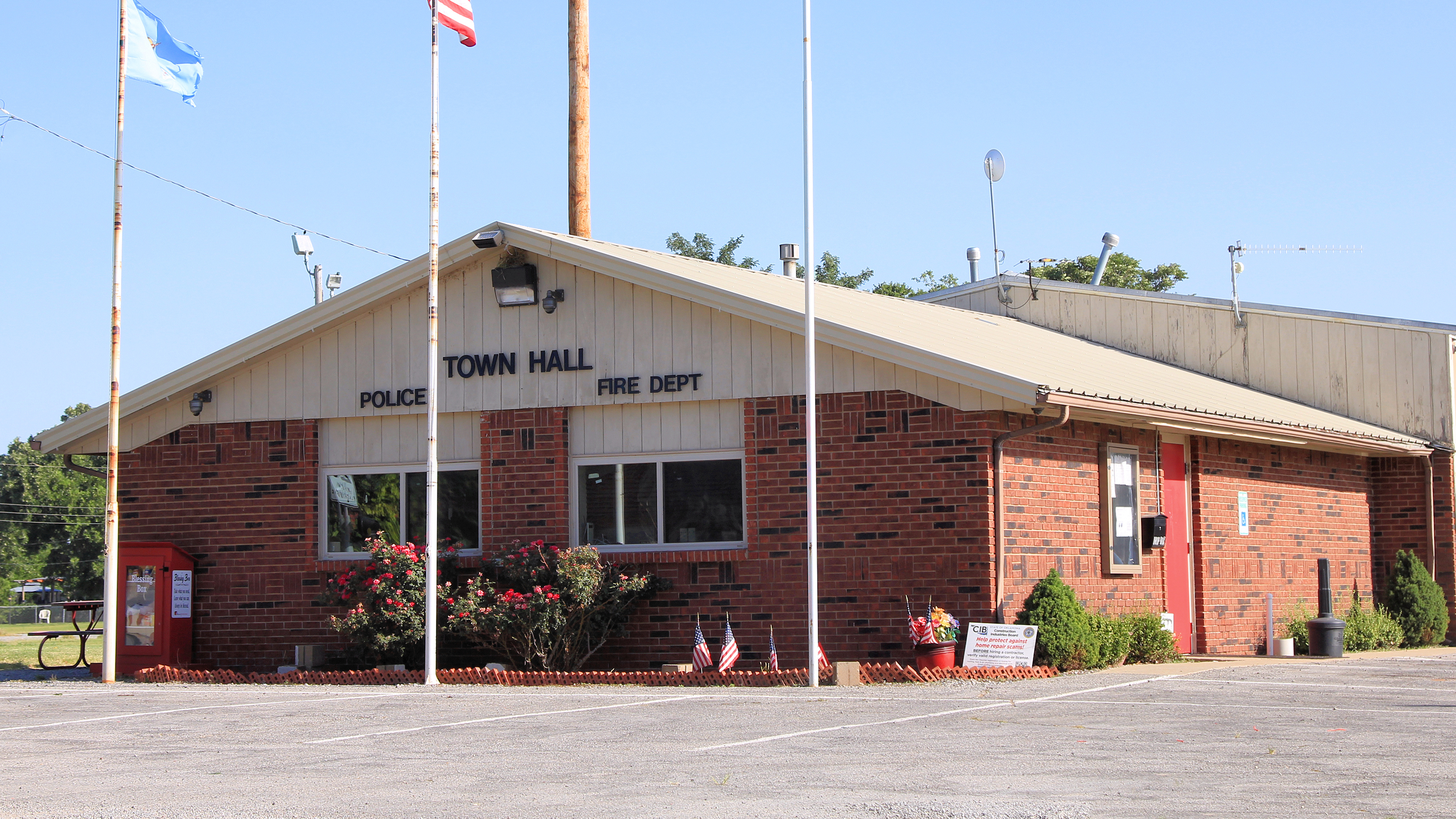
- Union City Town Hall

- Seal

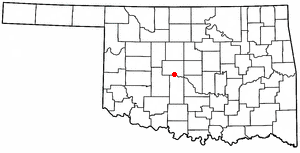
- Location of Union City, Oklahoma
- Coordinates: 35°24′05″N 97°54′17″W
- Country: United States
- State: Oklahoma
- County: Canadian

Area
  - Total: 56.58 sq mi (146.55 km^{2})
  - Land: 56.12 sq mi (145.35 km^{2})
  - Water: 0.47 sq mi (1.21 km^{2})
- Elevation: 1,316 ft (401 m)

Population (2020)
  - Total: 1,794
  - Density: 32.0/sq mi (12.34/km^{2})
- Time zone: UTC-6 (Central (CST))
  - Summer (DST): UTC-5 (CDT)
- ZIP code: 73090
- Area code: 405, exchange 483
- FIPS code: 40-75950
- GNIS feature ID: 2413412
- Website: www.unioncityok.gov

Union City is a town in Canadian County, Oklahoma, United States. As of the 2020 census, Union City had a population of 1,794. It is part of the Oklahoma City metropolitan statistical area.

== History ==
In 1889, a post office opened for the community of Union. A townsite plat was filed during the following year. Union City began in 1890 with the arrival of the Chicago, Kansas and Nebraska Railway (acquired by the Chicago, Rock Island and Pacific Railroad in 1891). The local economy was based on agriculture, and within four years the town had three grain elevators and a farm machinery dealership.

=== 1973 tornado ===
On May 24, 1973, a tornado rated F4 struck the Union City area and was the first tornado widely documented by science as part of storm chasing field research. The National Severe Storms Laboratory placed numerous storm chasers around the tornado to capture the life cycle on film.

== Geography ==
Union City is located in southern Canadian County. It is bordered to the east by Oklahoma City, to the north in part by El Reno, and to the south by Grady County, including the town of Minco. The Canadian River forms the county line and the southern boundary of Union City.

U.S. Route 81 passes through the center of the town, leading north 7.5 miles (12.1 km) to Interstate 40 and 10 miles (16 km) to El Reno, while leading south 6 miles (10 km) to Minco. Oklahoma State Highway 152 leads east from Union City 12 miles (19 km) to Mustang. Downtown Oklahoma City is 28 miles (45 km) to the east.

According to the United States Census Bureau, the town of Union City has a total area of 57.1 square miles (147.8 km^{2}), of which 56.6 square miles (146.6 km^{2}) is land, and 0.46 square miles (1.2 km^{2}) (0.83%) is water.

== Demographics ==
Historical population
Census	Pop.	Note	%±
1950	301		—
1960	329		9.3%
1970	300		−8.8%
1980	558		86.0%
1990	1,000		79.2%
2000	1,375		37.5%
2010	1,645		19.6%
2020	1,794		9.1%

=== 2020 census ===
As of the 2020 census, Union City had a population of 1,794. The median age was 39.7 years. 22.4% of residents were under the age of 18 and 12.5% of residents were 65 years of age or older. For every 100 females there were 120.1 males, and for every 100 females age 18 and over there were 131.0 males age 18 and over.

0.0% of residents lived in urban areas, while 100.0% lived in rural areas.

There were 605 households in Union City, of which 38.3% had children under the age of 18 living in them. Of all households, 58.8% were married-couple households, 14.4% were households with a male householder and no spouse or partner present, and 20.3% were households with a female householder and no spouse or partner present. About 20.7% of all households were made up of individuals and 8.7% had someone living alone who was 65 years of age or older.

There were 644 housing units, of which 6.1% were vacant. The homeowner vacancy rate was 1.1% and the rental vacancy rate was 9.2%.

=== 2010 census ===
As of the 2010 United States census, there were 1,645 people living in the town. The population density was 23.3 people per square mile (10/km^{2}). There were 568 housing units at an average density of 12 per square mile (4/km^{2}). The racial makeup of the town was 91.49% White, 1.75% African American, 2.98% Native American, 0.07% Asian, 0.15% Pacific Islander, 0.65% from other races, and 2.91% from two or more races. Hispanic or Latino of any race were 2.33% of the population.

There were 483 households, out of which 36.9% had children under the age of 18 living with them, 65.0% were married couples living together, 8.1% had a female householder with no husband present, and 21.9% were non-families. 18.0% of all households were made up of individuals, and 6.8% had someone living alone who was 65 years of age or older. The average household size was 2.68 and the average family size was 3.05.

In the town, the population was spread out, with 30.8% under the age of 18, 8.5% from 18 to 24, 26.9% from 25 to 44, 24.9% from 45 to 64, and 8.9% who were 65 years of age or older. The median age was 35 years. For every 100 females, there were 118.6 males. For every 100 females aged 18 and over, there were 104.7 males.

The median income for a household in the town was $40,819, and the median income for a family was $47,417. Males had a median income of $33,646 versus $22,039 for females. The per capita income for the town was $17,020. About 7.4% of families and 8.3% of the population were below the poverty line, including 9.1% of those under age 18 and 9.5% of those age 65 or over.

=== Racial and ethnic composition ===
Racial composition as of the 2020 census
Race	Number	Percent
White	1,438	80.2%
Black or African American	52	2.9%
American Indian and Alaska Native	71	4.0%
Asian	9	0.5%
Native Hawaiian and Other Pacific Islander	0	0.0%
Some other race	61	3.4%
Two or more races	163	9.1%
Hispanic or Latino (of any race)	121	6.7%

== Education ==
The majority of Union City is in the Union City Public Schools school district, which is composed of an elementary and a high school.

Other districts including parts of Union City are Banner Public School and El Reno Public Schools.

== Economy ==
The city's economy is still supported by goods and services for the local agriculture industry. One grain elevator still operates.
