= Henry Lassen House =

Historic house in Oklahoma, United States

- U.S. National Register of Historic Places
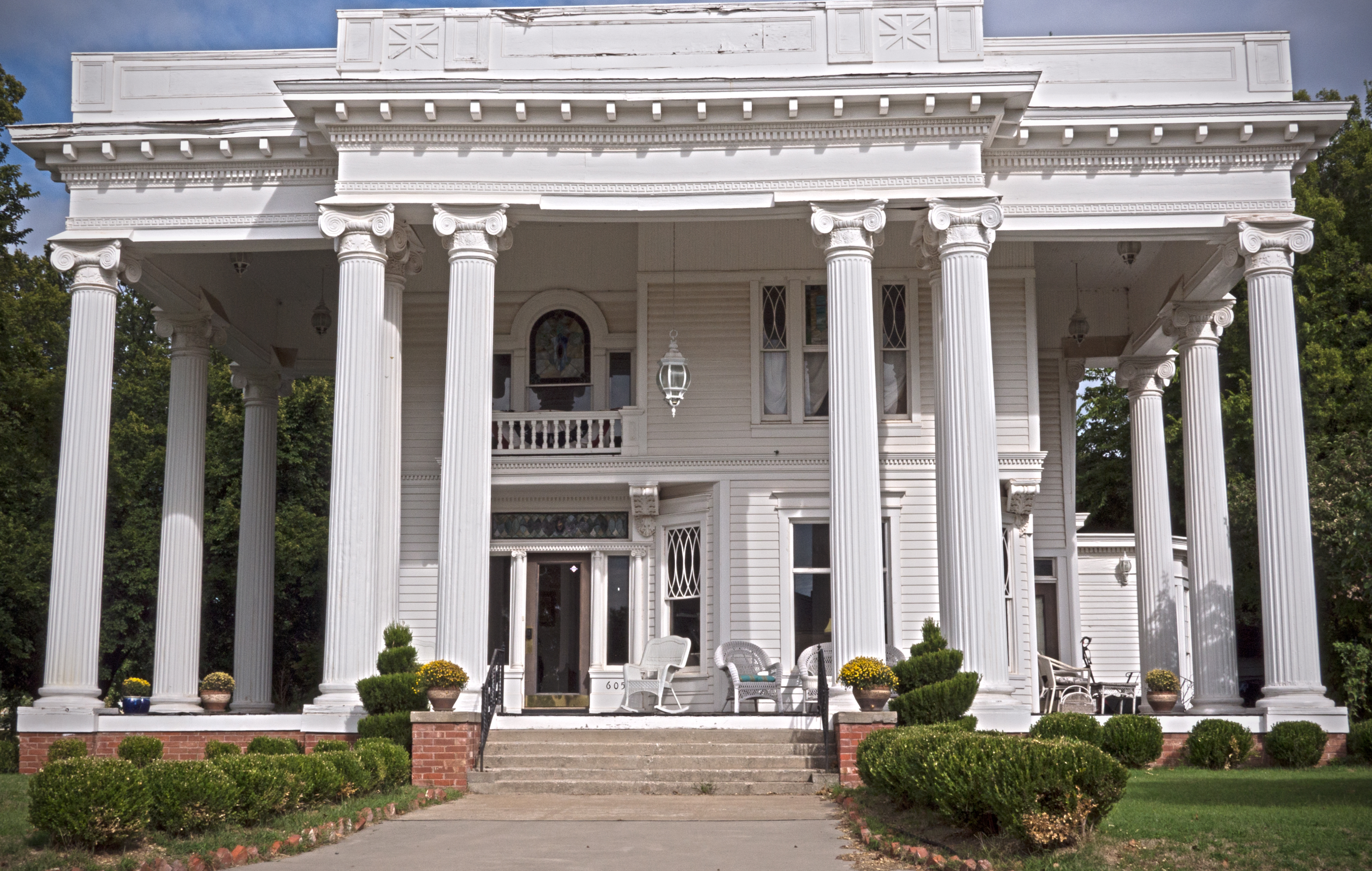

- Location within Oklahoma Location within the United States
- Location: 605 South Hoff, El Reno, Oklahoma
- Coordinates: 35°31′41″N 97°56′51″W
- Area: less than one acre
- Built: c. 1892
- Architectural style: Classical Revival
- NRHP reference No.: 08000852
- Added to NRHP: September 4, 2008

The Henry Lassen House is a historic house located at 605 South Hoff in El Reno, Oklahoma.

== Description and history ==
The three-story, Neoclassical-style residence was built after the Land Run of 1889 but prior to 1895, and was first owned by A.F. and Sadie Masterman. It was purchased in August 1898 by Henry Lassen, a resident of El Reno who was instrumental in the early history of the city, and his wife Mary. Between the end of 1901 and the summer of 1904, the house underwent major renovations, including the addition of a third story and construction of a two-story high, wraparound porch with large, regal-looking columns.

It was listed on the National Register of Historic Places on September 4, 2008.
