= Carnegie Library (El Reno, Oklahoma) =

- U.S. National Register of Historic Places
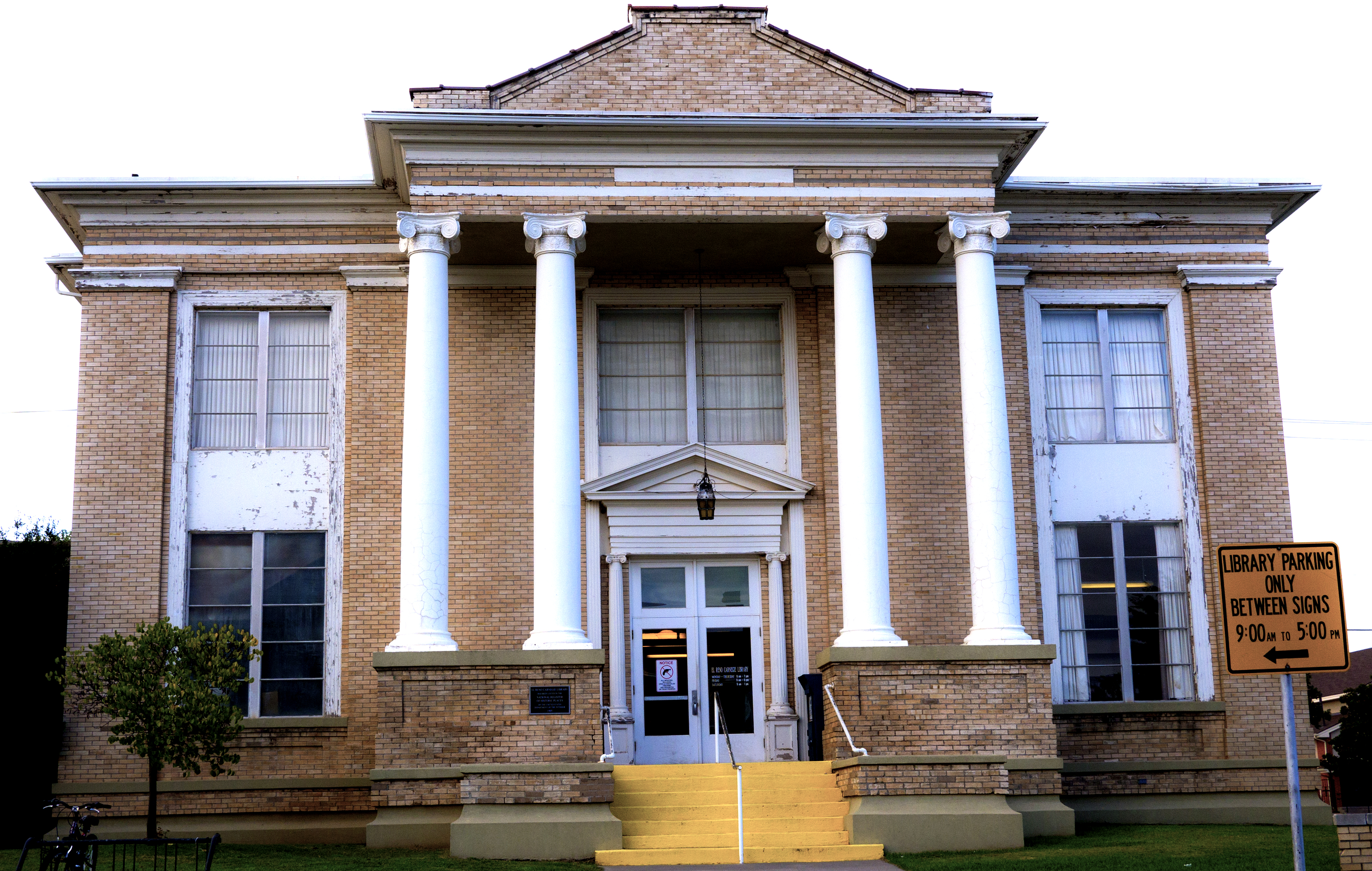

- Location within Oklahoma Location within the United States
- Location: 215 E. Wade St., El Reno, Oklahoma
- Coordinates: 35°31′53″N 97°57′5″W
- Area: less than one acre
- Built: 1903
- Architect: Kreipke, A.C. Smith & Moore
- NRHP reference No.: 80003257
- Added to NRHP: August 29, 1980

The Carnegie Library in El Reno, Oklahoma is the oldest Carnegie library in Oklahoma that is still functioning as a library. Constructed in 1903, it was listed on the National Register of Historic Places in 1980 and has been in continuous use as a library since its opening.

The main feature of the Classical Revival structure is its two-story portico with four ionic columns. The only structural addition to the library since its construction was a fireproof archives room built in 1964.
