= Fort Reno (Oklahoma) =

Former U.S. Army cavalry post

- Indian Territory / Canadian County, Oklahoma (near El Reno, Oklahoma)
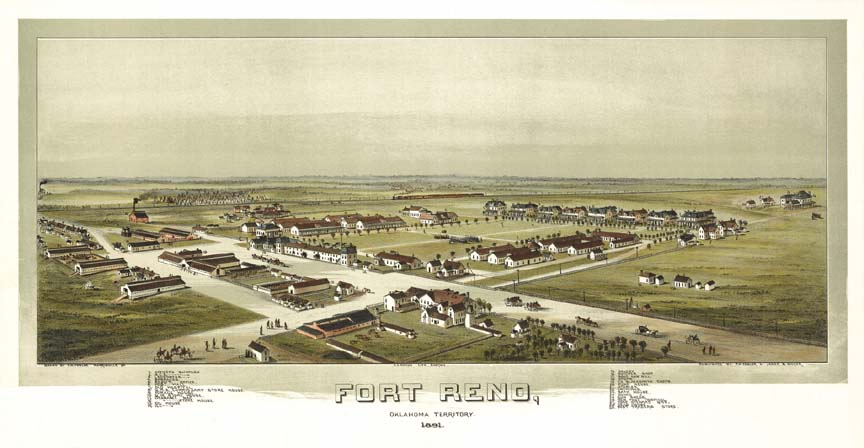
- Aerial view of Fort Reno, 1891.

Site information
- Type: Fort
- Controlled by: United States

Site history
- Built: 1874
- In use: 1874–1949
- Materials: Wood, stone, & brick
- Battles/wars: Indian Wars on the Southern Plains; Remount Station, World War I & World War II; German Prisoner of War camp, World War II.
- Fort Reno
- U.S. National Register of Historic Places
- U.S. Historic district
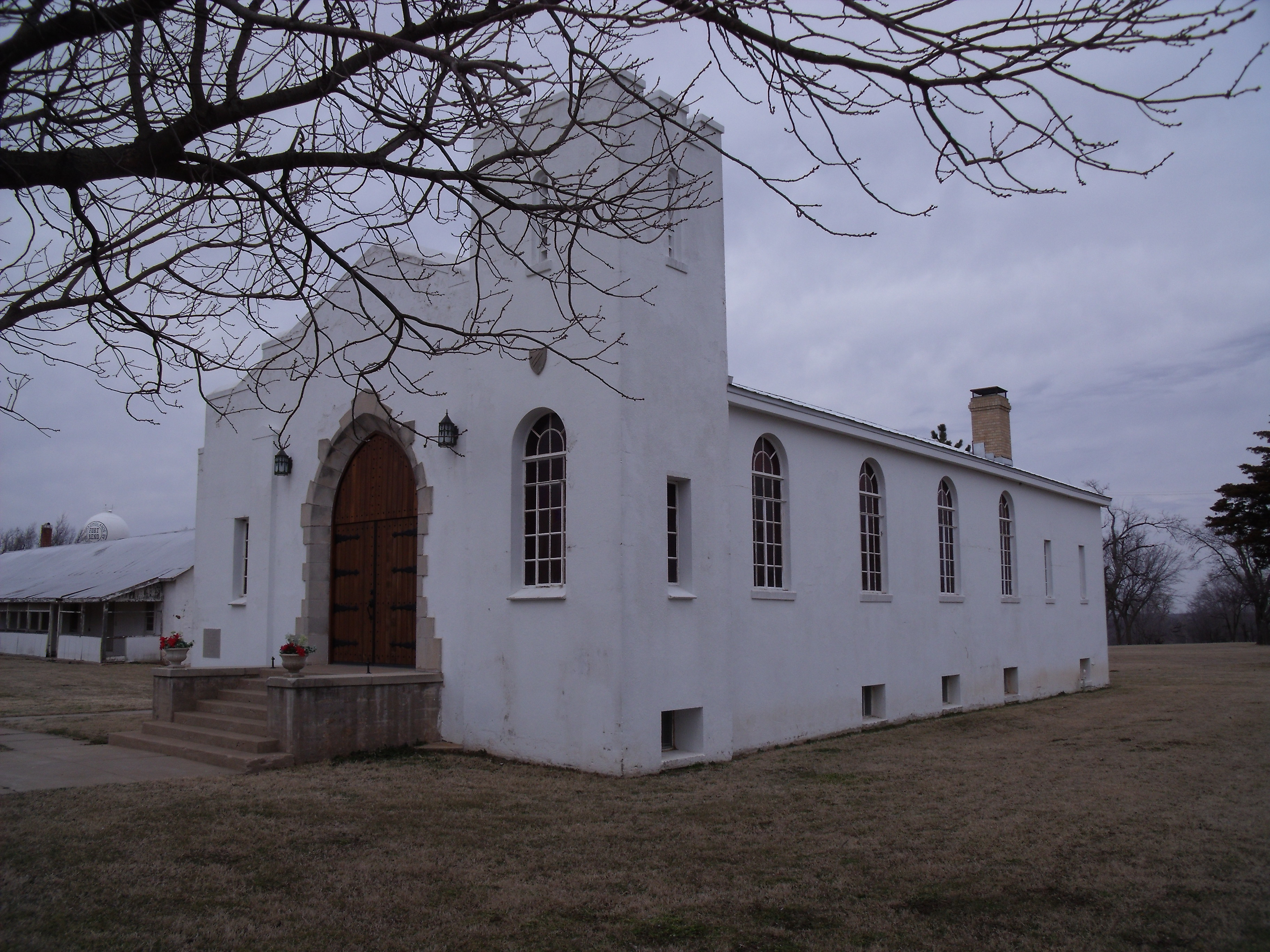

- Location within Oklahoma Location within the United States
- Nearest city: El Reno, Oklahoma
- Coordinates: 35°33′42″N 98°2′6″W
- Area: 9.9 acres (4.0 ha)
- Built: 1874
- NRHP reference No.: 70000529
- Added to NRHP: June 22, 1970

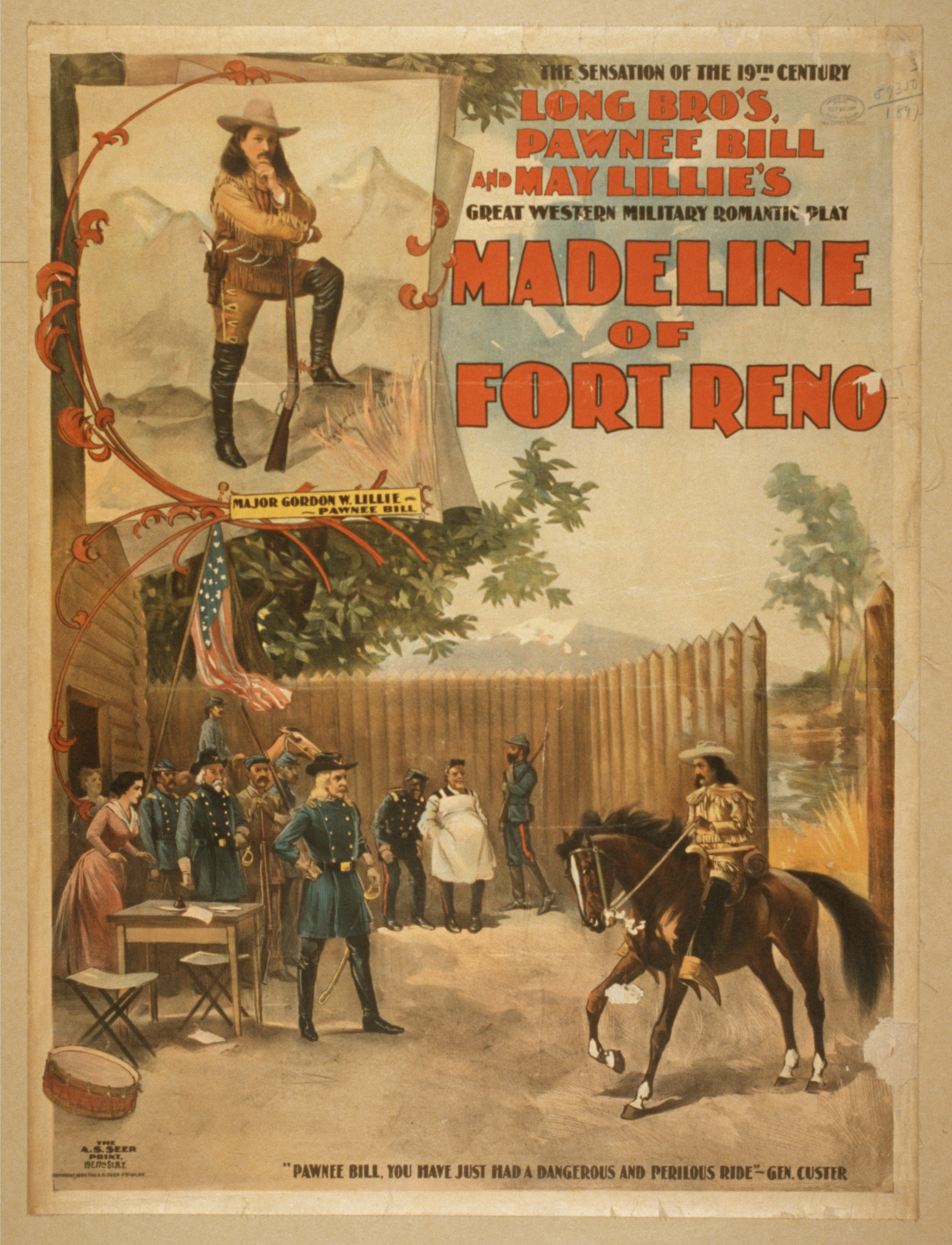
"Madeline of Fort Reno" a "great western military romantic play" put on by Pawnee Bill's Wild West Show, circa 1897.

Fort Reno is a former United States Army cavalry post west of El Reno, Oklahoma. It is named for General Jesse L. Reno, who died at the Battle of South Mountain in the American Civil War.

== History ==
Fort Reno began as a temporary camp in July 1874 near the Darlington Agency, which needed protection from an Indian uprising that eventually led to the Red River War. After the conflict ended, the post remained to control and protect the Southern Cheyenne and Southern Arapaho reservation, and Fort Reno was established as a permanent fort on July 15, 1874. Soldiers from Fort Reno also attempted to control Boomer and Sooner activity during the rush to open the Unassigned Lands for settlement. Among the units stationed here were the famed Ninth Cavalry of Buffalo Soldiers. The fort lent its name to the city of El Reno as well as Reno City, which was abandoned before Oklahoma statehood.

After Oklahoma statehood in 1907, the post was abandoned on February 24, 1908, but remained as a quartermaster remount depot. During World War II, German and Italian prisoners of war were housed on the grounds; the fort's chapel was built by members of the Afrika Korps. In 1949, the fort was abandoned by the Army and transferred to the U.S. Department of Agriculture, which uses it as its Grazinglands Research Laboratory. The laboratory's mission is to develop and deliver improved technologies, management strategies, and strategic and tactical planning tools which help evaluate and manage economic and environmental risks, opportunities, and tradeoffs, for integrated crop, forage, and livestock systems under variable climate, energy and market conditions.

The remains of German and Italian prisoners of war, residents of the fort, pioneer settlers, and military personnel are interred in the fort's cemetery. Ben Clark, a frontier scout for George Armstrong Custer and Philip Sheridan, is buried there. The fort is open to the public and has a visitor center with fort memorabilia and exhibits. Fort Reno was added to the National Register of Historic Places in 1970.

== Land claim ==
An executive order in 1883 officially identified the area assigned to Fort Reno as 9,493 acres (38.42 km^{2}) in the Cheyenne and Arapaho reserve, "setting apart for military purposes exclusively of the tract of land herein described." A presidential proclamation (27 Stat., 1018) signed April 12, 1892 by Benjamin Harrison extinguished all Cheyenne-Arapaho claims to their reserve except for individual allotments, but made no mention of any claims to Fort Reno.

For decades the combined Cheyenne-Arapaho Tribes have been trying to re-acquire the lands the fort occupied. In 1996, they asked the Clinton administration to get an opinion from the Department of the Interior on their claims. In 1999 the Interior Department issued an opinion saying that the tribes did have a credible argument that they did not cede the lands that were used by the military.

Several attempts have been made by Democratic politicians to aid the Cheyenne-Arapaho Tribes, most notably Eni Fa'aua'a Hunkin Faleomavaega, Jr. of American Samoa in 1997 and by Senator Daniel Inouye of Hawaii in 2000.

In 2005, Oklahoma Senator Jim Inhofe, co-sponsored by Senator Tom Coburn, introduced a bill to authorize the Secretary of Agriculture to lease oil and gas resources under the fort to fund preservation of the historic site and buildings. The bill received a committee hearing but no further action.
