= El Reno Municipal Swimming Pool Bath House =

- U.S. National Register of Historic Places
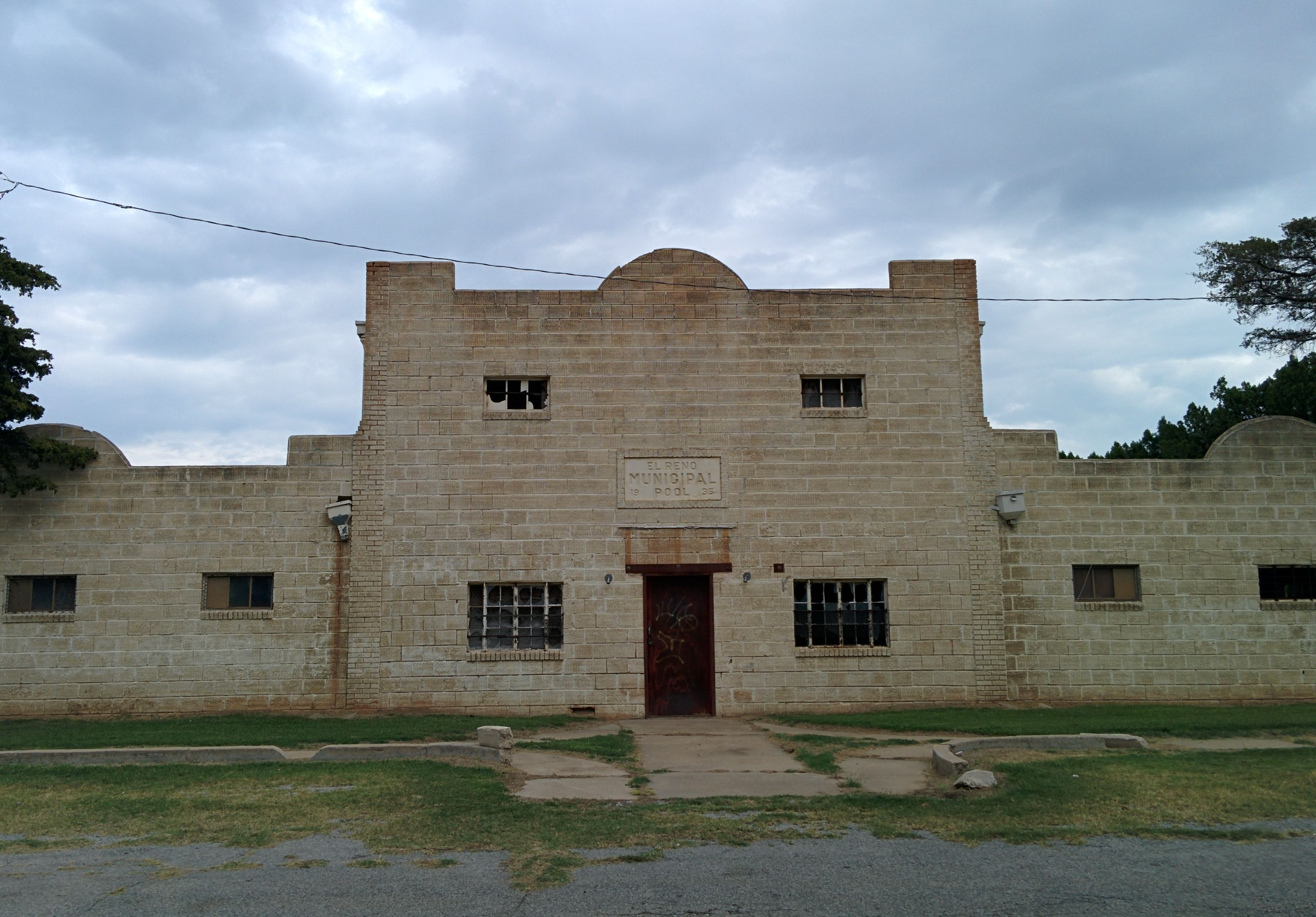
- Main entrance on west side of Municipal Bath House

- Location within Oklahoma Location within the United States
- Location: 715 South Morrison; El Reno, Oklahoma
- Coordinates: 35°31′32″N 97°57′53″W
- Built: 1935
- Architect: Arnold Sawalliach
- NRHP reference No.: 00000178
- Added to NRHP: March 16, 2000

The El Reno Municipal Swimming Pool Bath House is a bath house in El Reno, Oklahoma. Built in 1935, it was listed on the National Register of Historic Places in 2000. It is one of two Mission/Spanish Revival structures in El Reno.

The bath house was built as part of the swimming pool complex for the city by Federal Emergency Relief Administration workers along with city employees. The pool complex closed in 1991 and the pool itself was filled with dirt, but the original brick bath house remains. As one of the last Depression-era bath houses still standing in Oklahoma, it is listed on the 2015 List of Oklahoma's Most Endangered Places.
