= Avant's Cities Service Station =

- U.S. National Register of Historic Places
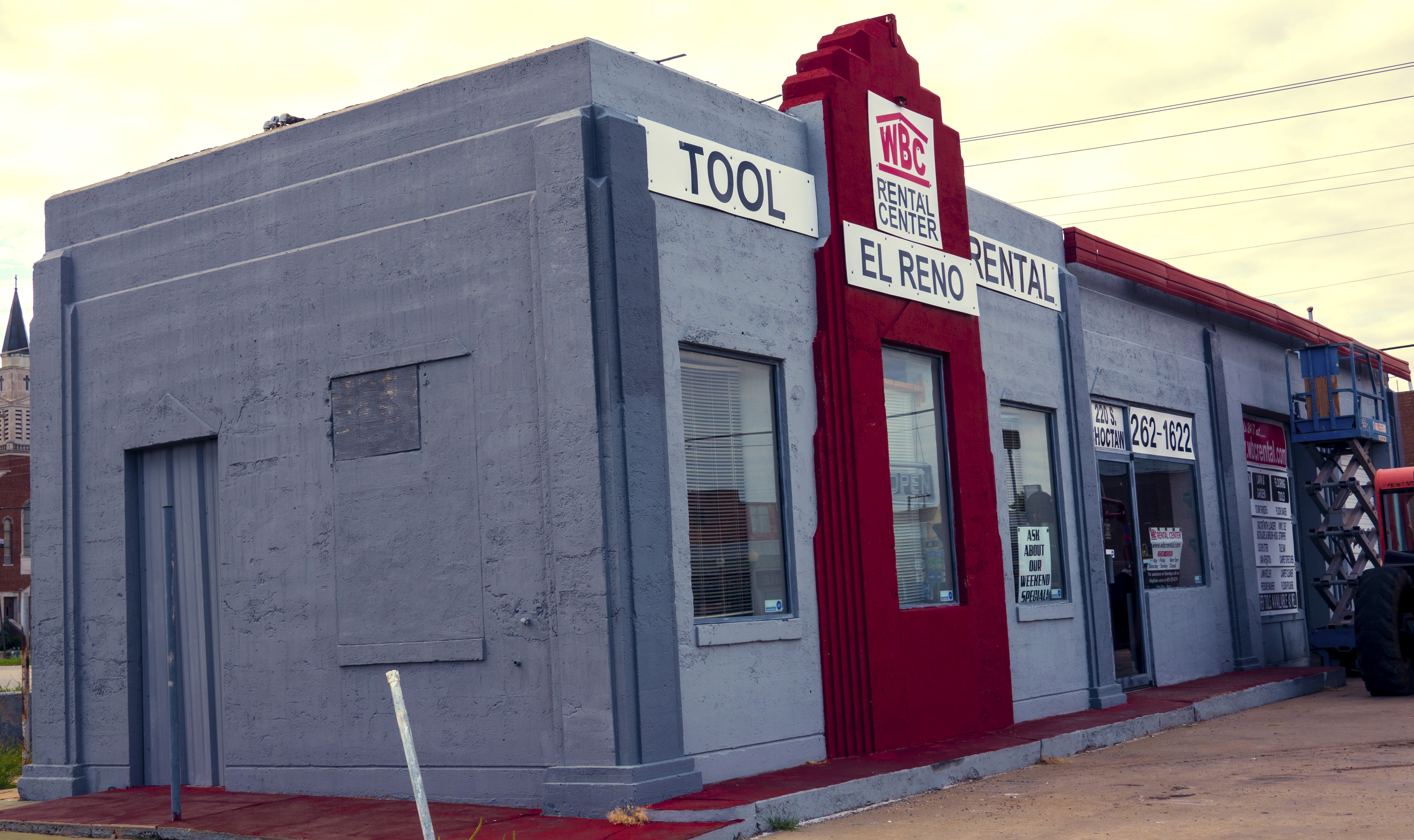

- Location within Oklahoma
- Location: 220 S. Choctaw, El Reno, Oklahoma
- Coordinates: 35°31′53″N 97°57′17″W
- Area: less than one acre
- Built: 1933
- Built by: Cities Service (now Citgo)
- NRHP reference No.: 04000131
- Added to NRHP: March 2, 2004

Avant's Cities Service Station is a historic service station located at 220 S. Choctaw in El Reno, Oklahoma. The Art Deco building was constructed in 1933 as a service station for Cities Service Company to fuel automobiles traveling on U.S. Route 66. The station was added to the National Register of Historic Places in 2004.

== History ==
The station was constructed in 1933 to provide fuel to travelers on Route 66, which was designated in 1926 and marked through El Reno in 1927. It was built at the site of the Campbell Hotel, which was demolished to allow for the station's construction. The hotel had primarily catered to railroad travelers; as automobile travel rose in popularity, the hotel lost business and closed. Tom Avant managed the station on behalf of the Cities Service Company, which leased the station from A. D. Connelly, for its first years of operation.

While the station competed for business with the Jackson Conoco Service Station at the same intersection, it still faced less competition than most Route 66 stations, four of which were often situated on the same corner. In fact, the two stations had no history of contentious competition despite their proximity, a sign that both received sufficient business from travelers on the highway. The station survived a contraction in the gas station business during World War II, though it changed ownership during the period; it continued to operate well into the postwar period, albeit under different owners and affiliations. By 1948, the station became a Phillips 66 affiliate and was owned by William J. Schulte. The station became a Texaco affiliate in the 1960s and passed through a succession of owners during the decade. As Interstate 40 bypassed Route 66 in the 1960s, traffic to the station declined after the decade. The station has since been converted to a muffler store, which is still in business.

== Architecture ==
Avant's Cities Service Station is designed in the Art Deco style; the building also features Moderne influences. The station was originally built with an office and a service bay; the original service bay was eventually converted to office space, and four additional service bays were added to the north end of the building. The concrete building features a flat roof with a zig-zag parapet rising to a peak at the center of the original office section's roof line. Stepped pilasters marked by vertical lines frame the central window below the parapet; additional pillars adjoin the office's door, which is located in the original bay. The station's appearance reflects the design standards of Cities Service, which promoted Moderne styles and allowed individual owners more say in station design. These practices contrasted with most of the company's competitors, who preferred more familiar domestic designs. To promote Cities Service, the station was originally painted white with green trim and featured the company's logo under the parapet; a recessed circle and empty light socket still mark the location of the logo.
