= Bridgeport Hill Service Station =

- U.S. National Register of Historic Places
- Location within Oklahoma Location within the United States
- Location: State Highway 66 and US Highway 281 Spur, El Reno, Oklahoma
- Coordinates: 35°33′03″N 98°16′36″W
- Built: 1934
- Architect: Leroy Tilley
- NRHP reference No.: 03001239
- Added to NRHP: December 5, 2003

The Bridgeport Hill Service Station is a group of three buildings on Bridgeport Hill near Geary, Oklahoma. Originally constructed as a service station on U.S. Route 66, it includes a well house, an auto garage, and the gas station itself. It was listed on the National Register of Historic Places in 2003 as an example of a private business constructed to take advantage of the then-newly constructed US Highway 66.

The gas station is a wooden structure with a sloped metal roof and canopy, while the service garage is a metal building on a concrete slab with windows and a single overhead door. The well house is a concrete-block building, also with a metal roof but with no windows, which contains a water well dug to a depth of 77 feet (23 m). The builder of the station, Leroy Tilley, commemorated the well with a concrete slab in front of the well house engraved with the date the well was completed and its depth.

The Tilley family operated the Bridgeport Hill station until sometime after Interstate 40 bypassed Bridgeport in 1962. Joseph Tilley, who owned the station, left it to his brother Leroy upon his death, and Leroy's widow continued to live on the property until at least 1987.
