= Mennoville Mennonite Church =

Historic church in Oklahoma, United States

- U.S. National Register of Historic Places
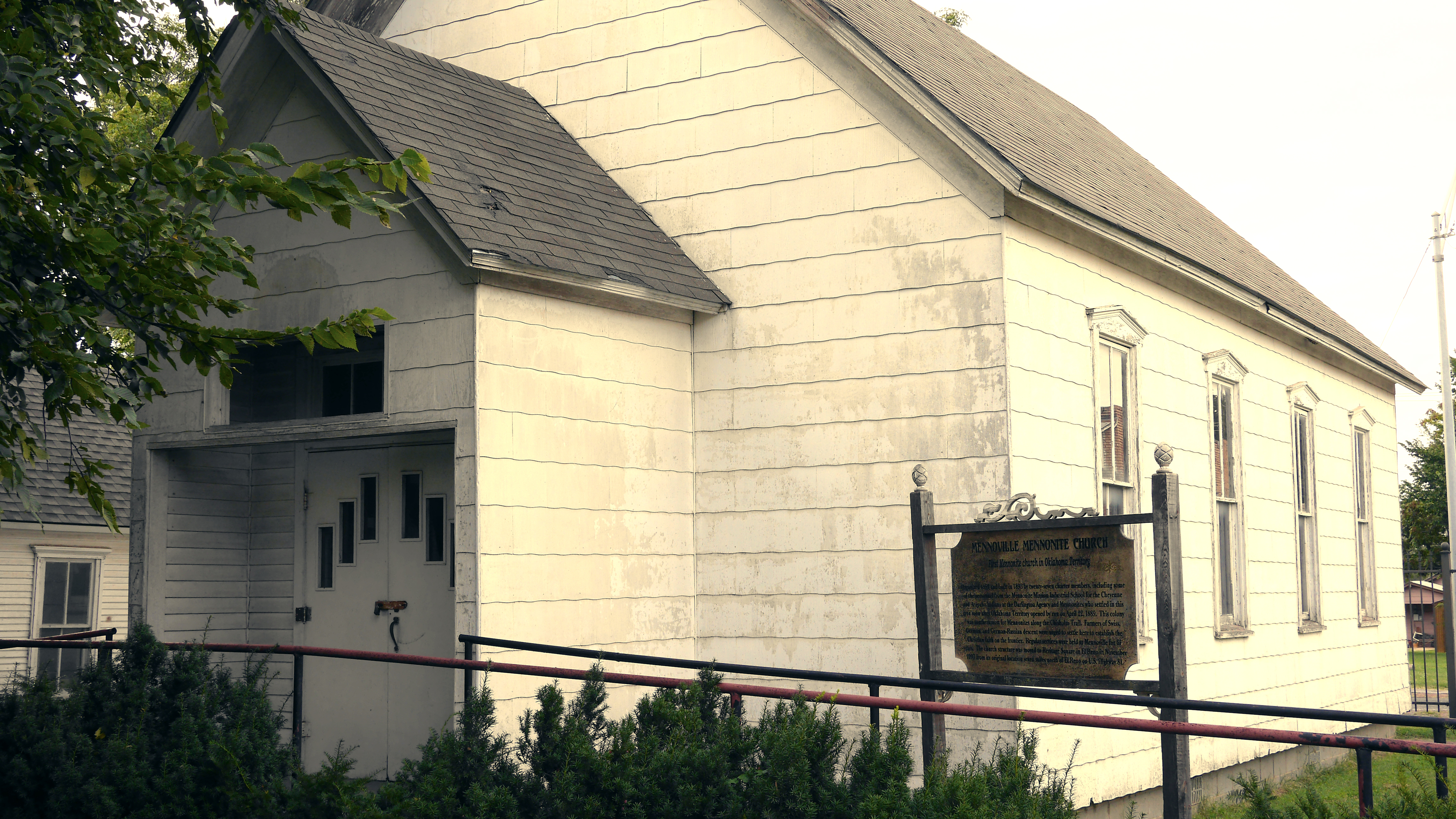

- Location within Oklahoma Location within the United States
- Nearest city: El Reno, Oklahoma
- Coordinates: 35°38′20″N 97°57′33″W
- Area: 2 acres (0.81 ha)
- Built: 1894
- NRHP reference No.: 79001989
- Added to NRHP: October 4, 1979

Mennoville Mennonite Church is a historic Mennonite church in El Reno, Oklahoma.

It was built in 1894 and was added to the National Register in 1979.
