= West Point Christian Church =

Historic church in Oklahoma, United States

- U.S. National Register of Historic Places
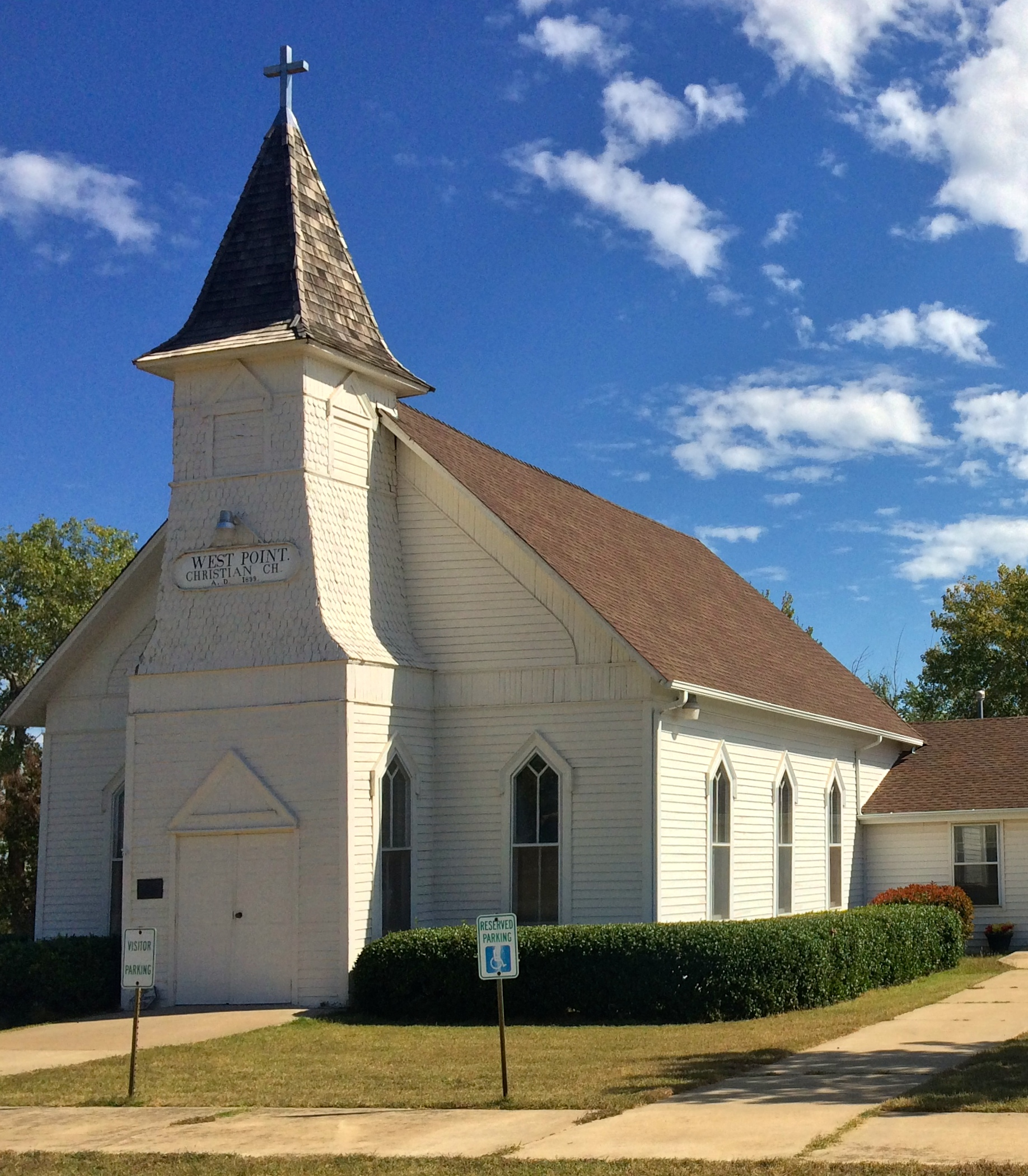

- Location within Oklahoma Location within the United States
- Nearest city: Yukon, Oklahoma
- Coordinates: 35°26′57″N 97°47′40″W
- Area: 1 acre (0.40 ha)
- Built: 1898
- NRHP reference No.: 83002079
- Added to NRHP: September 2, 1983

West Point Christian Church is a historic church in Yukon, Oklahoma.

It was built in 1898 and was added to the National Register of Historic Places in 1983.
