= Mulvey Mercantile =

- U.S. National Register of Historic Places
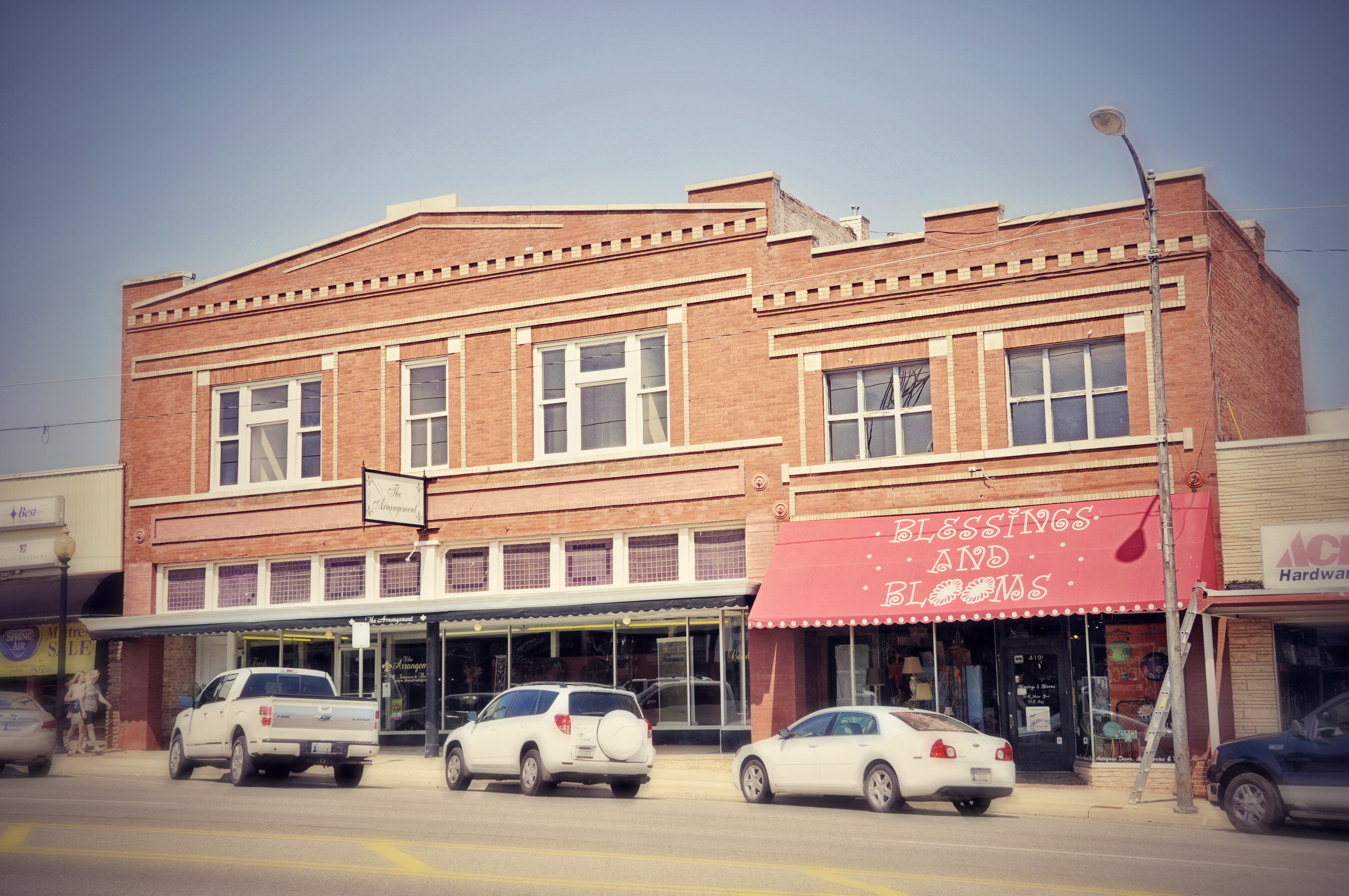
- The Mulvey Mercantile in 2012

- Location within Oklahoma Location within the United States
- Location: 425 W. Main, Yukon, Oklahoma
- Coordinates: 35.50816°N 97.7496°W
- Area: less than one acre
- Built: 1904
- NRHP reference No.: 82003670
- Added to NRHP: September 20, 1982

The Mulvey Mercantile is a two-story, red brick commercial building in Yukon, Oklahoma. It was constructed in 1904 as a dry goods store by the Mulvey brothers, and the firm was the largest retail store in the city until the Great Depression. It operated as a hardware store for many years, and is currently occupied by a home decor business.

The building was listed on the National Register of Historic Places in 1982.
