= El Reno station (Rock Island Line) =

- Rock Island Depot
- U.S. National Register of Historic Places
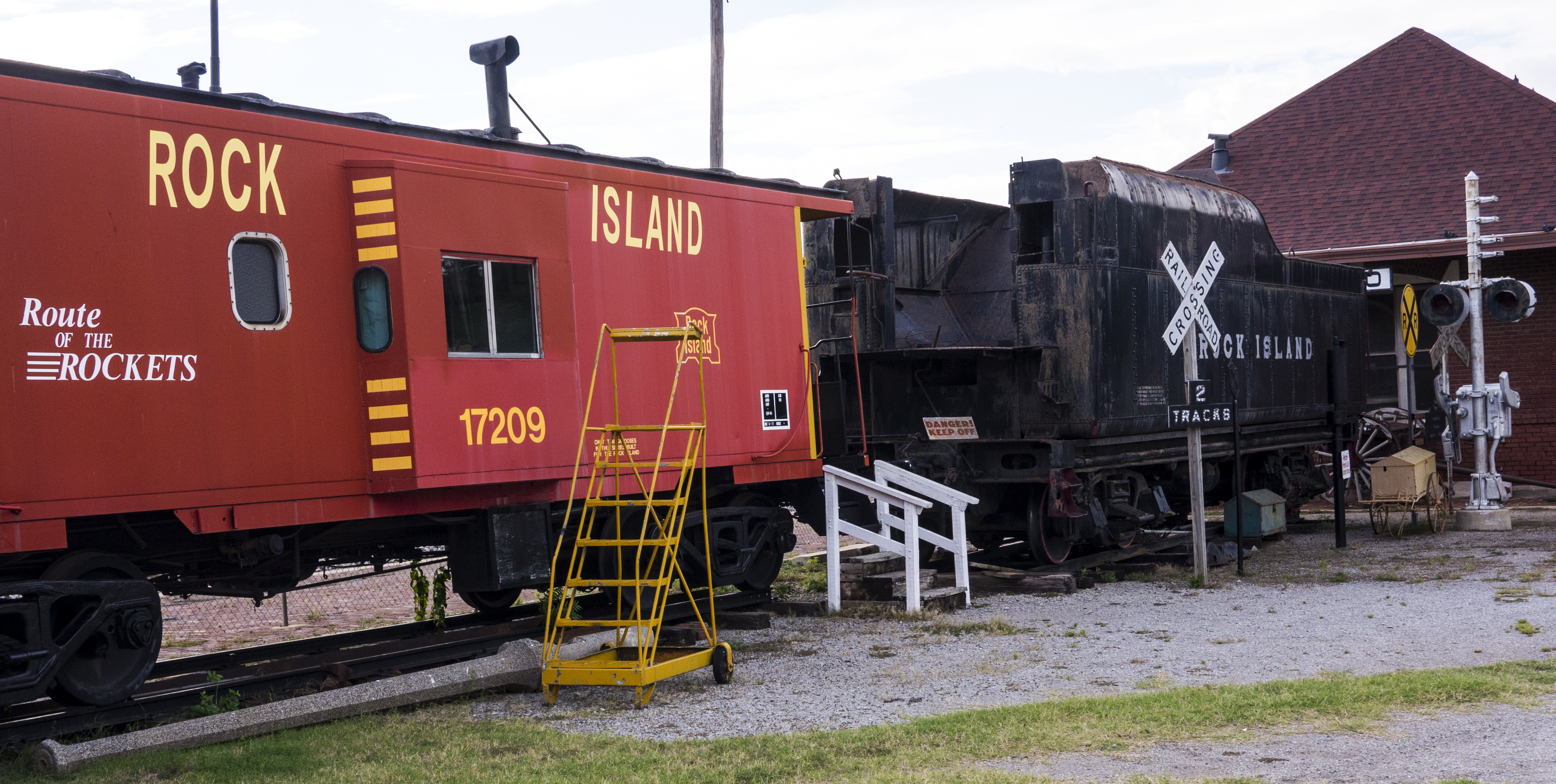
- Restored caboose outside the Rock Island Depot

- Location within Oklahoma Location within the United States
- Location: 400 W. Wade, El Reno, Oklahoma
- Coordinates: 35.531111°N 97.958611°W
- Area: less than one acre
- Built: 1907
- Architect: A. A. Hawk
- NRHP reference No.: 83002078
- Added to NRHP: March 7, 1983

The Rock Island Depot is a one-story brick structure in El Reno, Oklahoma. Built in 1907 on the railroad tracks that ran along the western boundary of the Unassigned Lands that led to El Reno's settlement in 1889, it served as a passenger and freight terminal for the junction of the east–west and north–south lines of the Rock Island Railroad.

The one-story building is notable for its length, 176 feet (54 m), but otherwise maintains the standard depot design. The architecture is Mission/Spanish Colonial Style. The roof is red tile and the exterior is red brick. Windows are double-hung and have white stone sills. Embellishments include stone keystones above the windows. Brick walls in front of the depot and on the platforms were originally installed.

The depot was a working railroad station until the early 1970s. The Canadian County Historical Society then took ownership of the building, which now houses the Canadian County Historical Museum.

Preceding station	Chicago, Rock Island and Pacific Railroad	Following station
Calumet toward Tucumcari	Tucumcari – Memphis	Yukon toward Memphis
Union City toward Teague	Teague – Minneapolis	Okarche toward Minneapolis
