= El Reno, Oklahoma =

City in Oklahoma, US

- City
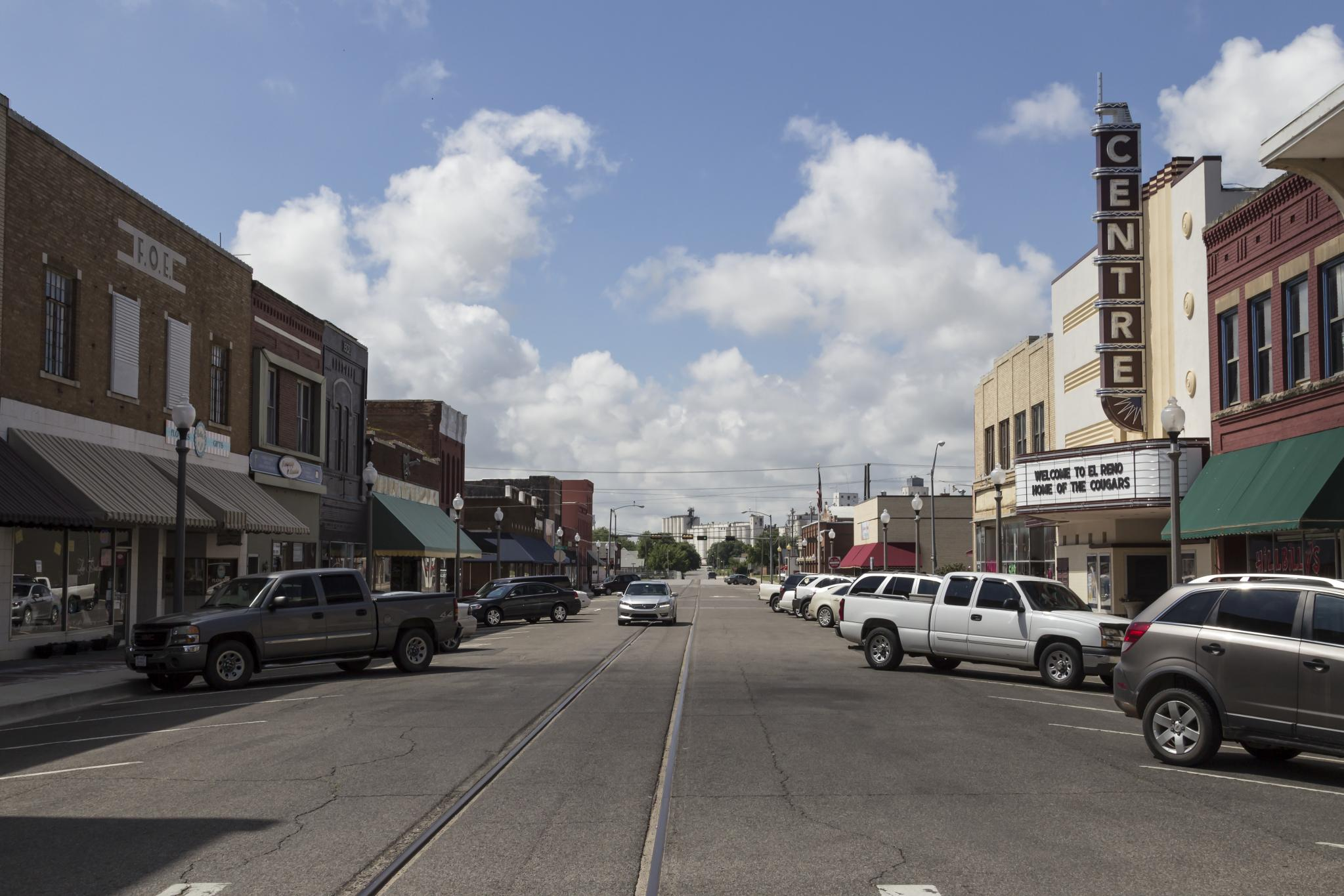
- Downtown El Reno

- Logo
- Motto: "It's good to be here."
- Location in the United States El Reno (the United States)
- Coordinates: 35°32′35″N 97°57′58″W
- Country: United States
- State: Oklahoma
- County: Canadian

Area
  - Total: 80.18 sq mi (207.66 km^{2})
  - Land: 79.58 sq mi (206.12 km^{2})
  - Water: 0.59 sq mi (1.54 km^{2})
- Elevation: 1,339 ft (408 m)

Population (2020)
  - Total: 16,989
  - Density: 213.5/sq mi (82.42/km^{2})
- Time zone: UTC-6 (Central (CST))
  - Summer (DST): UTC-5 (CDT)
- ZIP code: 73036
- Area code: 405
- FIPS code: 40-23700
- GNIS feature ID: 2410416
- Website: www.elrenook.gov

El Reno (/ɛl rinoʊ/) is a city in and the county seat of Canadian County, Oklahoma, United States. As of the 2020 census, the population was 16,989, representing an increase of 1.55% from the 16,729 recorded in the 2010 census. The city was established shortly after the 1889 land rush and named for the nearby Fort Reno. It is located in Central Oklahoma, about 25 miles (40 km) west of downtown Oklahoma City.

== History ==
Map of El Reno, 1891

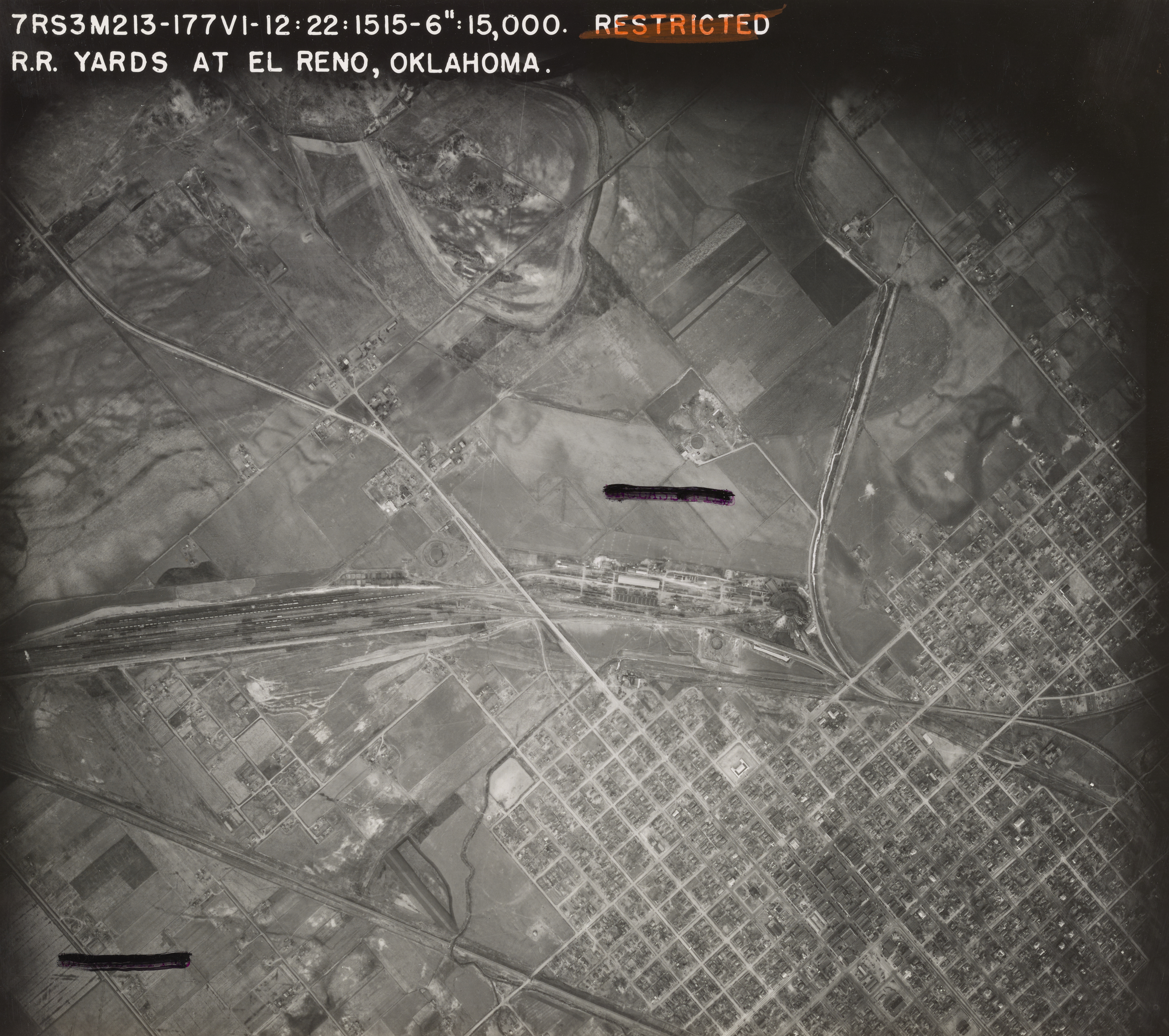
Rail yards, 1944

The land of Canadian County belonged to the historic Cheyenne and Arapaho tribes at the time of European encounter. In 1874, the United States established a fort to supervise the area and General Philip Sheridan took command. He named it Fort Reno in honor of his friend, Gen. Jesse L. Reno, who was killed in the American Civil War.

After the 1889 land run, there were three entities the local postmaster had to keep separate - Fort Reno, Reno City, and the community township or Village of (El) Reno. The Village of El Reno originated shortly after the 1889 land run, with the post office coming into being in June of that year.

Although "el reno" means "the reindeer" in Spanish, the town was actually named, in part, after nearby Fort Reno, with the name "Reno" ultimately derived from Anglicized French "Reynaud". Reindeer are not native to Oklahoma.

The town's name was taken from the nearby military post of Fort Reno, with the "el" (meaning "the" in Spanish) later added by the local postmaster to help differentiate the community from the also newly established Reno City.

Reno City was located on the north-side of the Canadian River five miles northeast of community of El Reno. The community of El Reno was located on the south-side of the Canadian river.

The original village townsite was platted by the Oklahoma Homestead and Town Company on 120 acres of the homestead of John Foreman. In 1890, Foreman's 120 acres along with 80 acres of Thomas Jensen's, were incorporated into the Village of El Reno.

After the railroad company announced their rail lines were going to run on the south side of the Canadian river, Reno City relocated to the township of El Reno. The original Reno City site north of the river was abandoned. What remained and continues to this day is Fort Reno and the city of El Reno.

El Reno is located on the 98th meridian west, about 25 miles west of Oklahoma City. The eastern side of the meridian was opened to non-Indian settlement in the Land Rush of 1889. The western side was opened in 1892, when the federal government also made some Cheyenne and Arapaho lands available for settlement by non-Native Americans. The town was subsequently selected as the land district office for the 1901 land lottery drawings.

In 1932, the United States Southwestern Reformatory was constructed about 2 miles (3.2 km) west of El Reno. The federal reformatory housed male adult federal prisoners and was later restricted to house young adult male prisoners, aged 18 to 26. In the mid-1970s it was renamed by the United States Department of Justice, Federal Bureau of Prisons, as the Federal Correctional Institution, El Reno (FCI El Reno). Prisoner age limits were lifted and men of all ages have been incarcerated here ever since. As medium-security prison, it has become the fifth-largest federal prison in the U.S. The prison is still one of the largest employers in El Reno. In 2015 President Barack Obama visited the prison, the first time a sitting president has visited any federal prison.

During World War II, Fort Reno, about 5 mi (8.0 km) northwest of El Reno, was the site of a prisoner of war camp for Germans and Italians. The POW cemetery has been preserved and has stones bearing the names of German and Italian prisoners who died there.

Following World War II, the US Army determined it did not need the fort. In 1948 the fort was transferred to the U.S. Department of Agriculture, for use as a research laboratory. The laboratory studies environmentally sustainable forage and livestock production, contributing to preservation of the Great Plains of North America.

At one time, railroads contributed strongly to the city economy. A terminal and repair facility for the Chicago, Rock Island and Pacific Railroad (CRI&P or "Rock Island"), which employed a large number of people, was based here. Some 750 of the company's 970 employees in the state worked in El Reno. Due to changes taking place throughout the railroad industry, the CRI&P went bankrupt in 1979. It abandoned the depot and railyards in 1980. The railyards are still vacant.

== Culture ==
A legend says the fried onion burger was invented at the Hamburger Inn in El Reno in the 1920s so the owner could save money by using less meat in his five-cent burgers. Since 1988 El Reno holds an annual Fried Onion Burger Day Festival in downtown the first Saturday in May.

In 2001, El Reno was the first city in Oklahoma to re-establish streetcar service in the downtown area: the Heritage Express Trolley. Such service had not been available since 1947, and it was the only operating trolley line in the state that year. Another line has since been started in Oklahoma City. The Heritage Express was installed with aid of a federal transportation grant and as part of a complex project also to improve the downtown's streets and drainage system.

The former train depot and some other buildings were acquired by the Canadian County Historical Society for adaptive use as part of a museum complex. The 1954 film noir Human Desire includes locomotive and yard scenes filmed in the El Reno rail yards.

El Reno is a Main Street America community. The Oklahoma Main Street Program is part of a national network affiliated with the National Trust for Historic Preservation. El Reno started its Main Street program in 1988; it was one of four cities in 2006 selected nationally to win the annual Great American Main Street Award. El Reno's program focuses on the Rock District of downtown.

Buildings in the town that are on the National Register of Historic Places include the Carnegie Library, El Reno High School, and the Mennoville Mennonite Church.

== Geography ==
According to the United States Census Bureau, the city has a total area of 80.4 square miles (208 km^{2}), of which 80.0 square miles (207 km^{2}) are land and 0.4 square miles (1.0 km^{2}) (0.56%) is water.

El Reno is located at the interchange of I-40 and U.S. Route 81. At one time, it sat on the boundary between Oklahoma Territory and Indian Territory, and sits approximately 20 miles (32 km) west of the old Chisholm Trail. Jesse Chisholm is buried nearby.

== Climate and weather events ==
El Reno has endured numerous weather-related incidents.

On May 24, 2011, the violent and long-tracking 2011 El Reno–Piedmont tornado, an EF5 tornado, struck parts of northwestern El Reno. The tornado was one of the largest tornadoes in history and killed a total of 9 people, and injured 181 others.

Two years later, on May 31, 2013, rural areas near El Reno were hit by a record-breaking multiple-vortex tornado. The tornado set a record with a width of 2.6 miles (4.2 km). Multiple storm chasers, including Mike Bettes and Dan Robinson, were injured, and Tim Samaras, Paul Samaras, and Carl Young of the TWISTEX team, alongside amateur Richard Henderson, were killed.

This tornado was initially ranked an EF5; however, due to the maximum damage being EF3, the EF5 rating was dropped for an EF3 rating on August 30, 2013.

Despite the EF3 rating, the tornado is widely infamous due to its width.

An EF3 tornado struck southern parts of El Reno on May 25, 2019. Touching down at 10:32 pm, the tornado damaged a service station before moving east-northeastward and crossing Interstate 40. It damaged billboards before striking a motel and a mobile home park at U.S. Highway 81, both of which suffered significant damage. One part of the motel had most of its second-floor walls destroyed, and several mobile homes were destroyed, killing two people and injuring many others. East of Highway 81, the tornado damaged an automobile service building and a house on Route 66. The tornado caused tree damage before dissipating on Alfadale Road north of Route 66. The tornado had a maximum estimated width of 75 yards (69 m) and injured 19 people.

Climate data for El Reno, Oklahoma
Month	Jan	Feb	Mar	Apr	May	Jun	Jul	Aug	Sep	Oct	Nov	Dec	Year
Mean daily maximum °F (°C)	47.4 (8.6)	53.0 (11.7)	63.2 (17.3)	73.4 (23.0)	80.8 (27.1)	88.7 (31.5)	94.4 (34.7)	93.3 (34.1)	84.8 (29.3)	74.6 (23.7)	60.4 (15.8)	50.1 (10.1)	72.0 (22.2)
Mean daily minimum °F (°C)	23.9 (−4.5)	28.6 (−1.9)	37.3 (2.9)	47.8 (8.8)	56.6 (13.7)	65.2 (18.4)	70.1 (21.2)	68.4 (20.2)	60.7 (15.9)	49.5 (9.7)	37.3 (2.9)	27.4 (−2.6)	47.7 (8.7)
Average precipitation inches (mm)	1.0 (25)	1.3 (33)	2.3 (58)	2.6 (66)	5.4 (140)	4.4 (110)	2.3 (58)	2.8 (71)	4.1 (100)	2.5 (64)	1.8 (46)	1.0 (25)	31.5 (800)
Source 1: weather.com
Source 2: Weatherbase.com

== Demographics ==
Historical population
Census	Pop.	Note	%±
1890	285		—
1900	3,383		1,087.0%
1910	7,872		132.7%
1920	7,737		−1.7%
1930	9,384		21.3%
1940	10,078		7.4%
1950	10,991		9.1%
1960	11,015		0.2%
1970	14,510		31.7%
1980	15,486		6.7%
1990	15,414		−0.5%
2000	16,212		5.2%
2010	16,749		3.3%
2020	16,989		1.4%
U.S. Decennial Census

El Reno is part of the Oklahoma City Metropolitan Statistical Area.

=== 2020 census ===
As of the 2020 census, El Reno had a population of 16,989. The median age was 36.2 years, with 24.6% of residents under the age of 18 and 14.4% of residents 65 years of age or older, while for every 100 females there were 112.9 males and for every 100 females age 18 and over there were 116.4 males age 18 and over.

84.4% of residents lived in urban areas, while 15.6% lived in rural areas.

There were 5,959 households in El Reno, of which 33.1% had children under the age of 18 living in them. Of all households, 41.3% were married-couple households, 20.7% were households with a male householder and no spouse or partner present, and 29.9% were households with a female householder and no spouse or partner present. About 29.8% of all households were made up of individuals and 13.3% had someone living alone who was 65 years of age or older.

There were 6,786 housing units, of which 12.2% were vacant. Among occupied housing units, 60.1% were owner-occupied and 39.9% were renter-occupied. The homeowner vacancy rate was 2.5% and the rental vacancy rate was 14.6%.

Racial composition as of the 2020 census
Race	Percent
White	64.2%
Black or African American	6.3%
American Indian and Alaska Native	11.1%
Asian	0.4%
Native Hawaiian and Other Pacific Islander	0.1%
Some other race	6.9%
Two or more races	11.0%
Hispanic or Latino (of any race)	16.1%

=== 2010 census ===
As of the census of 2010, 16,749 people, 5,727 households, and 3,842 families resided in the city. The population density was 202.7 inhabitants per square mile (78.3/km^{2}). The 6,484 housing units averaged 81.1 units per square mile (31.3 units/km^{2}). The racial makeup of the city was 71.8% White, 11.1% Native American, 7.2% African American, 0.5% Asian, 4.7% from other races, and 4.7% from two or more races. Hispanics or Latinos of any race were 12.9% of the population.

Of the 5,727 households, which 31.7% had children under the age of 18 living with them, 50.0% were married couples living together, 12.7% had a female householder with no husband present, and 32.9% were not families. About 28.5% of all households were made up of individuals, and 12.7% had someone living alone who was 65 years of age or older. The average household size was 2.50 and the average family size was 3.08.

In the city, the population was distributed as 24.2% under the age of 18, 10.5% from 18 to 24, 30.8% from 25 to 44, 21.1% from 45 to 64, and 13.4% who were 65 years of age or older. The median age was 35 years. For every 100 females, there were 114.7 males. For every 100 females age 18 and over, there were 119.5 males.

The median income for a household in the city was $31,200, and for a family was $39,106. Males had a median income of $29,521 versus $20,107 for females. The per capita income for the city was $15,570. About 11.4% of families and 16.3% of the population were below the poverty line, including 19.6% of those under age 18 and 10.4% of those age 65 or over.

== Government and infrastructure ==
The City of El Reno operates under a council-manager government system. City employees include the city manager, finance director, police chief, fire chief, city clerk, public works director, code enforcement director, community services director, and city librarian.

The Federal Bureau of Prisons operates the Federal Correctional Institution, El Reno.

== Transportation ==
The Union Pacific railroad said El Reno is a "Train Town USA," one of 131 communities out of 7,300 communities it serves, because of the town's relationship with the line.

== Education ==
- Canadian Valley Technology Center is on famed Route 66 about 3 mi (4.8 km) east of the city.
- Redlands Community College opened in 1971.

Public school districts with parts of El Reno include: El Reno Public Schools, Banner Public School, Darlington Public School, Maple Public School, and Riverside Public School.

== Media ==
The El Reno Tribune publishes Wednesday and Sunday and has a circulation around 5,000.

== In film ==
Multiple movies have been filmed at least in part in El Reno, including:

- Human Desire (1954), a Fritz Lang film
- Rain Man (1988), with Dustin Hoffman and Tom Cruise
- Elizabethtown (2005), a Cameron Crowe film
- Parts of the film American Underdog were filmed in El Reno.
- Stillwater (2021), with Matt Damon
- 13 Minutes (2021), a disaster film
- Twisters (2024), a disaster film

For many years the filmmaker George Kuchar would drive to El Reno to document the storm season, staying at the El Reno Motel. The result was his film Wild Night in El Reno.

== Notable people ==
- Harlond Clift (1912–1992), Major League Baseball infielder
- Suzan Shown Harjo (1945-), advocate for American Indian rights
- Solomon Andrew Layton (1864–1943), architect, lived in El Reno in 1902 - 1911.
- Sam Pittman (1961-), Head Football Coach Arkansas Razorbacks
- Harvey Pratt (1941-2025), Native American forensic artist
- Hub Reed (1936-2024), pro basketball player
- Erik Rhodes (1906–1990), Broadway and Hollywood actor
- Sam Rivers (1923–2011), jazz musician and composer
- Kenzie Ruston (1991-), NASCAR driver in the K&N Pro Series East
- Gaylord Shaw (1942-2015), 1978 Pulitzer Prize–winning journalist
- Robert Stanley (aviator) (1912–1977), test pilot
