= National Register of Historic Places listings in Grady County, Oklahoma =

Location of Grady County in Oklahoma

This is a list of the National Register of Historic Places listings in Grady County, Oklahoma.

This is intended to be a complete list of the properties and districts on the National Register of Historic Places in Grady County, Oklahoma, United States. The locations of National Register properties and districts for which the latitude and longitude coordinates are included below, may be seen in a map.

There are 13 properties and districts listed on the National Register in the county.

This National Park Service list is complete through NPS recent listings posted March 14, 2025.

== Current listings ==
	Name on the Register	Image	Date listed	Location	City or town	Description
1	Chickasha Downtown Historic District	Chickasha Downtown Historic District	March 10, 2005 (#05000132)	Roughly bounded by 1st St., 3rd St., Kansas Ave., 7th St., and the alley north of Chickasa Ave. 35°03′04″N 97°56′14″W	Chickasha	
2	Grady County Courthouse	Grady County Courthouse	March 10, 2005 (#05000131)	326 W. Choctaw Ave. 35°03′09″N 97°56′07″W	Chickasha	
3	Griffin House	Griffin House	June 9, 2014 (#14000297)	1402 W. Kansas Ave. 35°03′01″N 97°57′03″W	Chickasha	
4	Jewett Site		February 14, 1979 (#79001995)	Address Restricted	Bradley	
5	Knippelmeir Farmstead	Knippelmeir Farmstead	September 8, 2011 (#11000638)	672 OK 152; 35°20′07″N 97°59′41″W	Minco vicinity	
6	Minco Armory	Minco Armory	May 20, 1994 (#94000484)	407 W. Pontotoc St. 35°18′56″N 97°56′46″W	Minco	
7	New Hope Baptist Church	New Hope Baptist Church	June 5, 2003 (#03000515)	1202 S. Shepherd St. 35°02′20″N 97°55′51″W	Chickasha	
8	Oklahoma College for Women Historic District	Oklahoma College for Women Historic District	September 9, 2001 (#01000950)	roughly bounded by Grand Ave., 19th St., Alabama Ave., and the alley west of 15th St. 35°01′51″N 97°57′17″W	Chickasha	
9	Pocasset Gymnasium	Pocasset Gymnasium	December 13, 1996 (#96001489)	0.5 miles south of junction of Dutton Rd. and U.S. Highway 81; 35°11′31″N 97°57′17″W	Pocasset	
10	Rock Island Depot	Rock Island Depot	March 29, 1985 (#85000699)	Chickasha Ave. 35°03′07″N 97°55′55″W	Chickasha	
11	Silver City Cemetery	Silver City Cemetery	December 4, 2008 (#08001149)	6/10 mile from the section line on the southern side of section 22, T10N, R6W I.M. 35°19′42″N 97°44′54″W	Tuttle	
12	US Post Office and Federal Courthouse	US Post Office and Federal Courthouse	December 29, 1994 (#94001509)	Southwestern corner of the junction of 4th and Choctaw Sts. 35°03′07″N 97°56′12″W	Chickasha	
13	Verden Separate School	Verden Separate School	December 16, 2005 (#05001416)	315 E. Ada Sipuel Ave. 35°02′39″N 97°55′43″W	Chickasha	

== See also ==
- List of National Historic Landmarks in Oklahoma
- National Register of Historic Places listings in Oklahoma
