= Tornado outbreak of April 28–30, 1960 =

Weather event in the United States

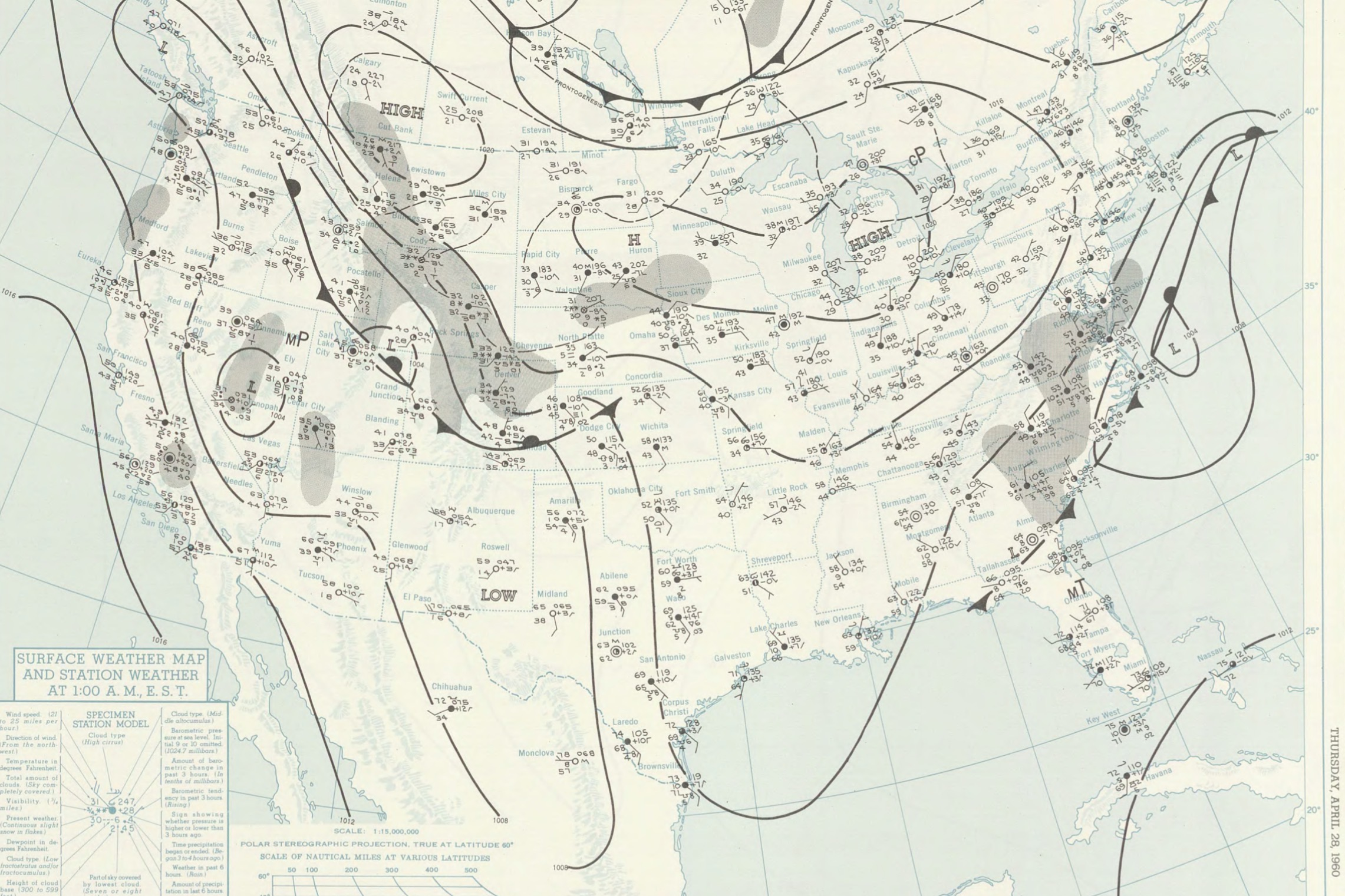
- Weather map on April 28, showing a developing low pressure area over the Utah-Wyoming border that would produce the tornado outbreak

Meteorological history
- Formed: April 28, 1960
- Dissipated: April 30, 1960

Tornado outbreak
- Tornadoes: 19 confirmed
- Max. rating: F3 tornado
- Duration: 3 days
- Highest winds: 85 mph (137 km/h); Will Rogers World Airport in Southwestern Oklahoma City
- Largest hail: 3.00 in (7.6 cm); Dill City, Oklahoma and Haysville, Kansas

Overall effects
- Fatalities: 3
- Injuries: 79
- Damage: $3.883 million (1960 USD)
- Areas affected: Great Plains, especially Oklahoma, Midwest, Mississippi Valley
- Part of the tornado outbreaks of 1960

A highly destructive outbreak of 19 tornadoes struck areas from Oklahoma to Indiana. (Note: An outbreak is generally defined as a group of at least six tornadoes (the number sometimes varies slightly according to local climatology) with no more than a six-hour gap between individual tornadoes. An outbreak sequence, prior to (after) the start of modern records in 1950, is defined as a period of no more than two (one) consecutive days without at least one significant (F2 or stronger) tornado.) The Oklahoma City metropolitan area took the brunt of the outbreak with 10 F2 or F3 tornadoes touching down in the area alone on April 28, including one F3 tornado that just missed Downtown Oklahoma City, tearing through southeast of there. The outbreak killed three, injured 79, and caused $3.883 million (1960 USD) in damage.

== Confirmed tornadoes ==
Confirmed tornadoes by Fujita rating
FU	F0	F1	F2	F3	F4	F5	Total
0	2	4	8	5	0	0	19

=== April 28 event ===
List of confirmed tornadoes – Thursday, April 28, 1960 (Note: All dates are based on the local time zone where the tornado touched down; however, all times are in Coordinated Universal Time and dates are split at midnight CST/CDT for consistency.) (Note: Prior to 1994, only the average widths of tornado paths were officially listed.)
F#	Location	County / Parish	State	Start coord.	Time (UTC)	Path length	Max. width	Summary
F0	SE of Watonga	Blaine	OK	35.80°N 98.35°W	01:00–?	0.1 miles (0.16 km)	10 yards (9.1 m)	The public reported that one of two funnel clouds touched down briefly over an open field. No damage occurred.
F3	SW of Oney	Caddo	OK	35.25°N 98.33°W	01:00–?	3.3 miles (5.3 km)	100 yards (91 m)	A strong tornado destroyed two farmsteads and left only one wall standing of a home south of Binger. Losses totaled $25,000. Only one wall remained standing of a home. Witnesses described the funnel as being the largest they had ever seen.
F3	N of Goddard to St. Mark to Western Maize	Sedgwick	KS	37.70°N 97.58°W	01:30–?	7.1 miles (11.4 km)	440 yards (400 m)	Several homes and a church were obliterated by this large, intense tornado. Trees were uprooted, power lines were tangled, livestock was killed, and debris was scattered all over the place. Airborne glass injured six people and damage was estimated at $25,000. High winds and hail up to 3 inches (7.6 cm) in diameter caused additional damage as well. Tornado researcher Thomas P. Grazulis listed this tornado as an F2.
F2	SE of Pocasset	Grady	OK	35.17°N 97.95°W	01:45–?	3.6 miles (5.8 km)	200 yards (180 m)	Strong, twin tornadoes passed near Pocasset with this one damaging multiple farmsteads. A house of seven was demolished, although there was only one minor injury. Losses totaled $2,500. This tornado occurred simultaneously with the three other strong events listed below in Grady County. Grazulis did not list this tornado as an F2 or stronger.
F2	NE of Amber to ESE of Sooner	Grady	OK	35.18°N 97.85°W	01:45–?	3.3 miles (5.3 km)	200 yards (180 m)	This was the second of the twin tornadoes. Five farmsteads were damaged or destroyed, of which one farmhouse was demolished. Losses totaled $250. The tornado may have traveled all the way to Anadarko, which would be a path length 25 miles (40 km).
F3	N of Pocasset to WNW of Sooner	Grady	OK	35.22°N 97.95°W	01:45–?	3.6 miles (5.8 km)	200 yards (180 m)	This intense tornado tore through farmland and severely damaged three farmsteads. The western half of a house was destroyed, injuring two people inside. Losses totaled $25,000. Grazulis listed this tornado as an F2.
F2	Southern Pocasset	Grady	OK	35.18°N 97.95°W	01:45–?	2 miles (3.2 km)	300 yards (270 m)	Destructive tornado accompanied by baseball-sized hail hit the south side of Pocasset. The tornado damaged outbuilding, roofs and trees, resulting in $250,000 in damage. The hail broke windows and damaged roofs as well. Nearly every home and building in town had irreparable roof damage. Grazulis did not list this tornado as an F2 or stronger.
F3	NW of Tuttle	Grady	OK	35.30°N 97.83°W	02:50–?	1.5 miles (2.4 km)	200 yards (180 m)	Strong tornado bounced through areas northwest of Tuttle, damaging 45-50 homes and destroying four others, including one home where a woman was injured. A school suffered roof damage and the east end of its gym was ripped clean off. Other buildings and a cotton gin were significantly damaged or destroyed as well. Losses totaled $250,000.
F3	Southwestern Oklahoma City to Forest Park	Oklahoma	OK	35.42°N 97.55°W	02:55–?	11.7 miles (18.8 km)	333 yards (304 m)	See section on this tornado – A total of 57 people were injured and damages reached $2.5 million.
F2	Southwestern Oklahoma City to N of Moore	Cleveland	OK	35.33°N 97.62°W	02:58–?	7.8 miles (12.6 km)	500 yards (460 m)	A strong tornado tore through the South Oklahoma City community. It destroyed 26 planes and four hangars at the South Shields airport while also destroying or severely damaging several farmsteads, a cemetery and several homes and businesses. Damages were estimated at $250,000. Large hail accompanied this storm, destroying crops, breaking windows, and damaging roofs and vehicles.<
F2	N of Etowah	Cleveland	OK	35.17°N 97.18°W	03:00–?	0.1 miles (0.16 km)	10 yards (9.1 m)	Brief, but strong tornado destroyed an oil drilling rig. No monetary damage value was given. Grazulis did not list this tornado as an F2 or stronger.
F2	Southwestern Oklahoma City to S of Moore	Cleveland	OK	35.32°N 97.55°W	03:05–?	3.8 miles (6.1 km)	400 yards (370 m)	A second tornado hit the town of Moore shortly after the first. A radio tower and barn southwest of town were destroyed before the tornado caused extensive damage in the town itself. Outbuildings were destroyed and at least 12 buildings were heavily damaged. The storm also produced large hail that damaged crops, broke windows, and damaged roofs and automobiles. Damages were estimated at $250,000 and six people were injured. The NWS Norman says the tornado did $500,000 in damage.
F2	W of Cromwell to N of Schoolton	Seminole	OK	35.35°N 96.53°W	05:45–?	6.1 miles (9.8 km)	800 yards (730 m)	3 deaths – Large tornado destroyed a farmstead as well as a house, where all three fatalities occurred. Trees, power lines, and several other farmsteads were damaged as well, including one farmstead where a home was shifted off of its foundation, injuring the person in it. Damage was estimated at $25,000. Grazulis listed this tornado as a high-end F3 that caused near-F4 damage.

=== April 29 event ===
List of confirmed tornadoes – Friday, April 29, 1960
F#	Location	County / Parish	State	Start coord.	Time (UTC)	Path length	Max. width	Summary
F0	N of Blackwell	Kay	OK	36.83°N 97.30°W	20:15–?	0.1 miles (0.16 km)	10 yards (9.1 m)	A tornado over open field was reported by a pilot. No damage occurred.
F1	Chanute	Neosho	KS	37.68°N 95.47°W	21:07–?	0.1 miles (0.16 km)	10 yards (9.1 m)	A brief tornado severely damaged a building on the west side of Chanute by ripping off it roof, causing $2,500 in damage.
F2	N of Welsh to SW of Redich	Jefferson Davis	LA	30.30°N 92.80°W	23:00–?	13.8 miles (22.2 km)	1,667 yards (1,524 m)	This massive tornado was nearly a 1 mile (1.6 km) wide at times. Several small towns were struck as well as areas around Hathaway before it dissipated near Redich. One house was destroyed, seven others were significantly damaged, and 12 more had minor damage. Four people were injured and damages were estimated at $25,000.
F1	NE of Intracoastal City to NE of New Iberia	Vermilion, Iberia	LA	29.80°N 92.13°W	00:00–?	33.2 miles (53.4 km)	450 yards (410 m)	A weak but long-tracked, large tornado started near Intracoastal City and moved northeastward through marshlands before crossing into Iberia County. Once there, it struck several small towns before dissipating near Portage. The heaviest damage was at a Naval Air Station Facility in New Iberia. Damages were estimated at $250,000.

=== April 30 event ===
List of known tornadoes – Saturday, April 30, 1960
F#	Location	County / Parish	State	Start coord.	Time (UTC)	Path length	Max. width	Summary
F1	Atlanta	Logan	IL	37.68°N 95.47°W	13:30–?	0.2 miles (0.32 km)	30 yards (27 m)	A tornado caused moderate damage to a farmstead on the west side of Atlanta before moving into the north side of town and dissipating. Damage was estimated at $2,500.
F1	SSW of Morgan Park	Porter	IN	41.60°N 87.05°W	19:00–?	0.1 miles (0.16 km)	10 yards (9.1 m)	A weak tornado uprooted a tree and damaged four automobiles southeast of Chesterton, causing an injury in one of them. Losses were estimated at $30.

=== Oklahoma City–Forest Park, Oklahoma ===
Oklahoma City–Forest Park, Oklahoma
F3 tornado
- on the Fujita scale

Overall effects
- Injuries: 57
- Damage: $2.5 million
- Areas affected: Eastern Oklahoma City metro

This very destructive, rain-wrapped F3 tornado embedded within a 3-mile-wide (4.8 km) swath of up to 2-inch-diameter (5.1 cm) hail and straight-line winds of nearly 100 mph (160 km/h) first touched down in the Rancho Village community in Southern Oklahoma City. It skipped northeastward, causing heavy damage to homes, businesses, trees, gardens, shrubs, and power lines in the Heronville, Capitol Hill, and Central Capitol Hill neighborhoods. It briefly paralleled the North Canadian River (now known as the Oklahoma River) before crossing it and moving through the present-day Boathouse District, just barely missing Downtown Oklahoma City, where oil derricks were blown over. The neighborhoods of Carverdale, Edwards Community, Dodson Heights, and Garden Neighborhood Council were then hit as well before the tornado struck Forest Park, Oklahoma. The Rock Manor Estates was heavily damaged before the tornado began to move out of populated areas. It then destroyed some crops before dissipating.

The tornado traveled 11.7 miles (18.8 km), was 333 yards (304 m) wide and caused $2.5 million in damage. Two homes were destroyed, 40 others were heavily damaged, and 1,500 others had minor damage. There were 57 injuries, only seven of which were minor, with some people only narrowly escaping death. As a whole, the storm itself caused $4 million in damage to the city. This event may have consisted of several small tornadoes or sub-vortices that grazed rooftops.

== Non-tornadic impacts ==
Numerous reports of large hail and destructive straight-line winds were recorded during the three-day outbreak. The strongest winds from the event were clocked at 85 mph (137 km/h) at Will Rogers World Airport in Southwestern Oklahoma City. The largest hail was 3.00 in (7.6 cm) in diameter, which was recorded in both Dill City, Oklahoma, and Haysville, Kansas. All three events occurred on April 28.

== See also ==
- List of North American tornadoes and tornado outbreaks
- 1999 Oklahoma tornado outbreak
