= Tornadoes of 1960 =

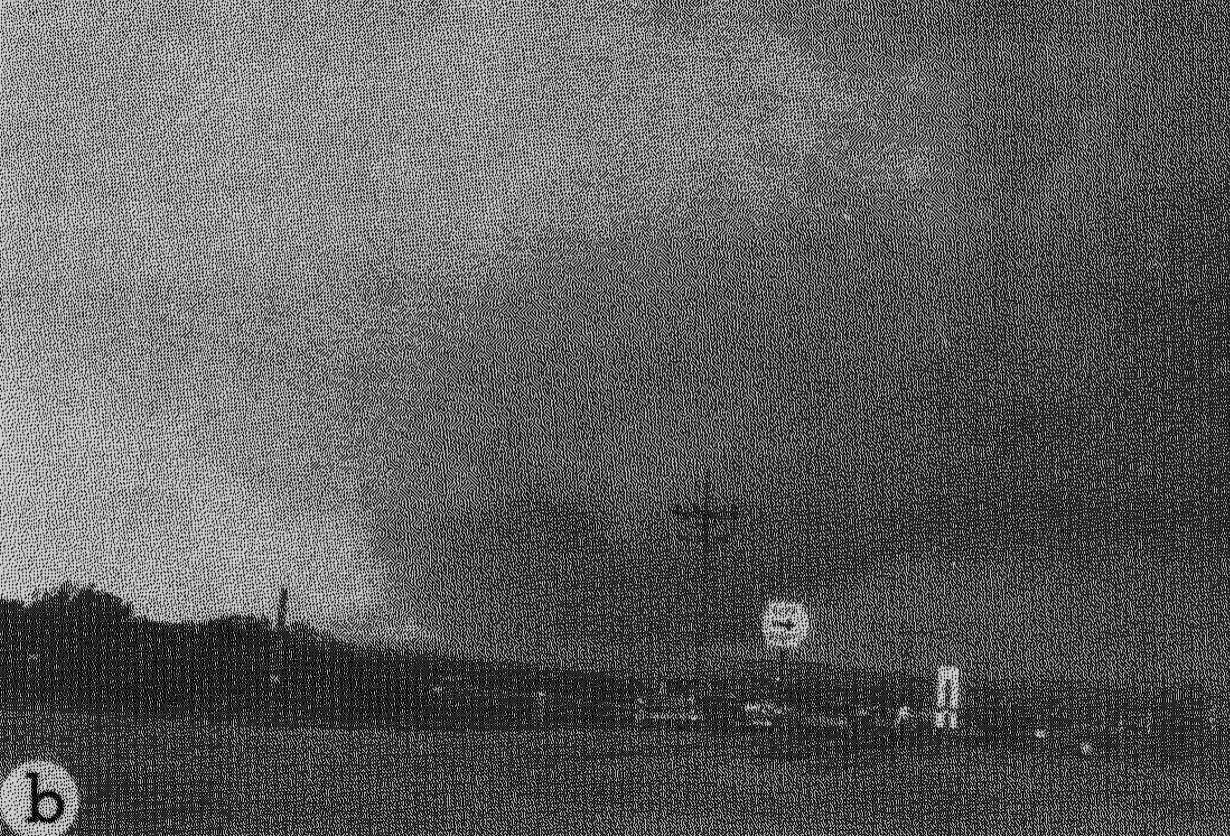
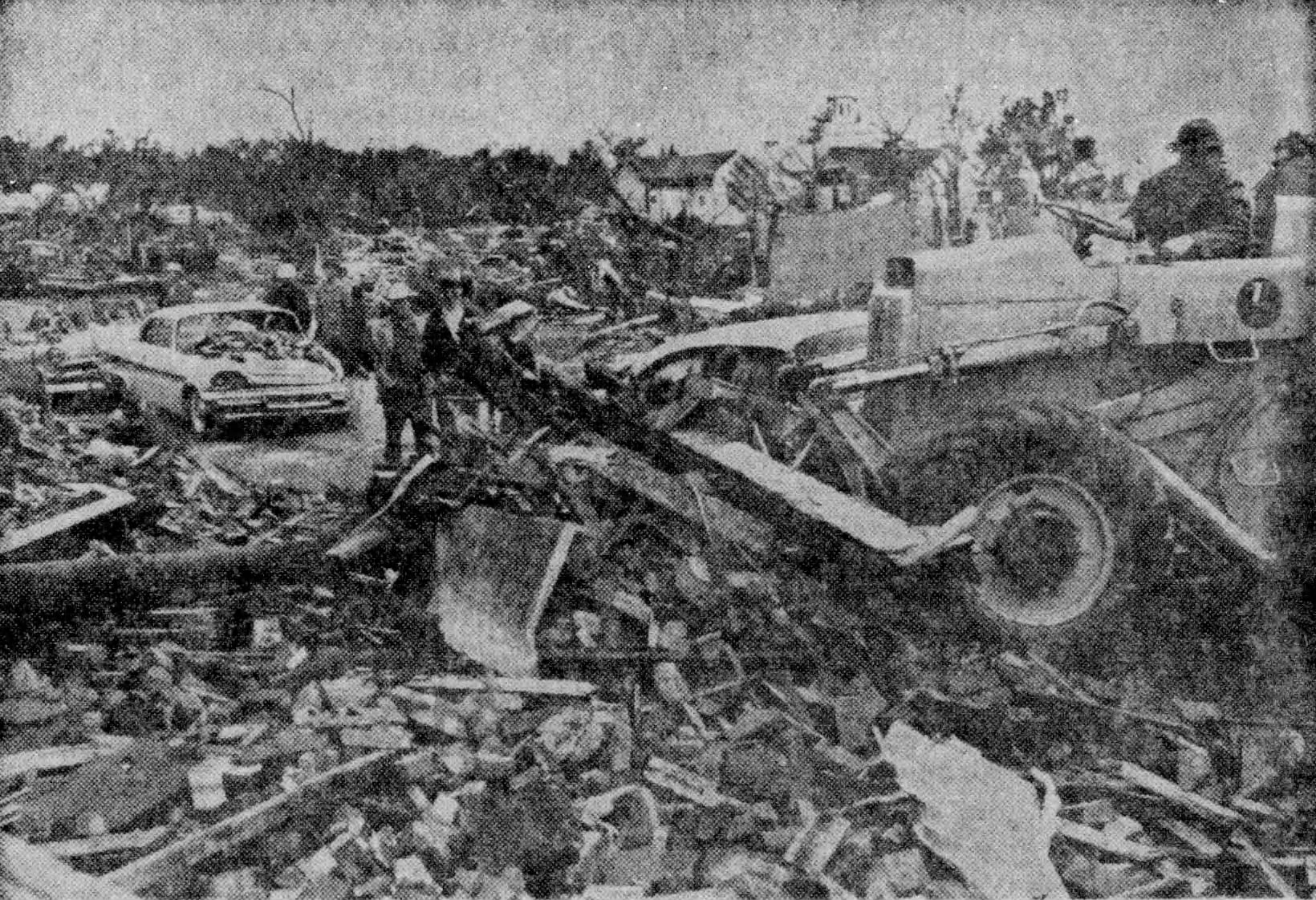
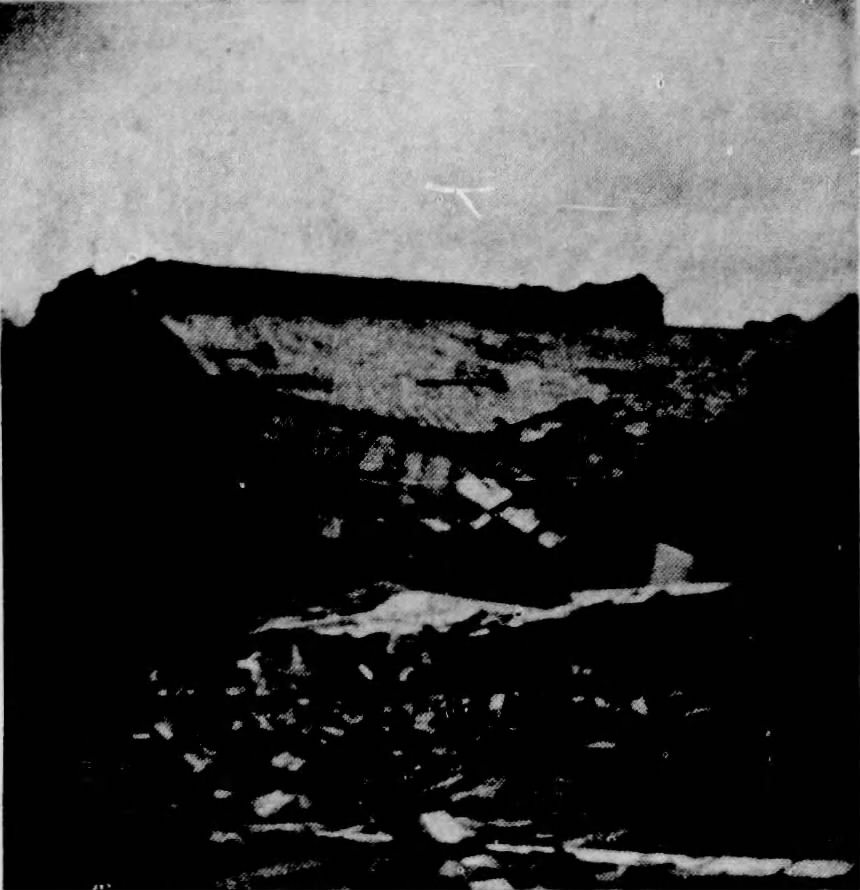
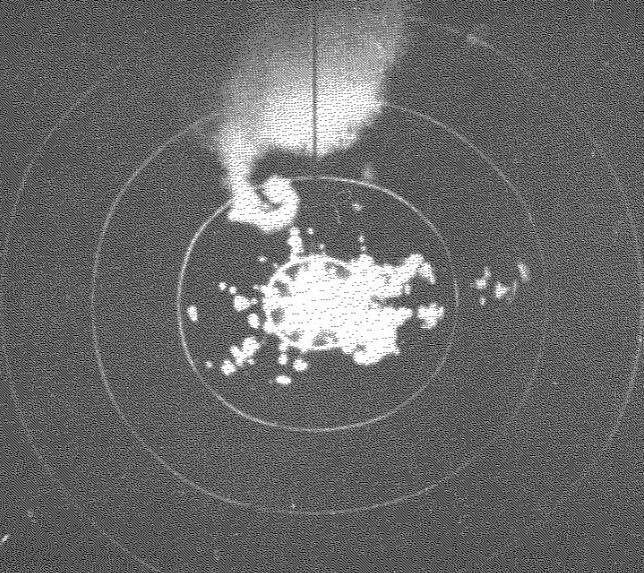
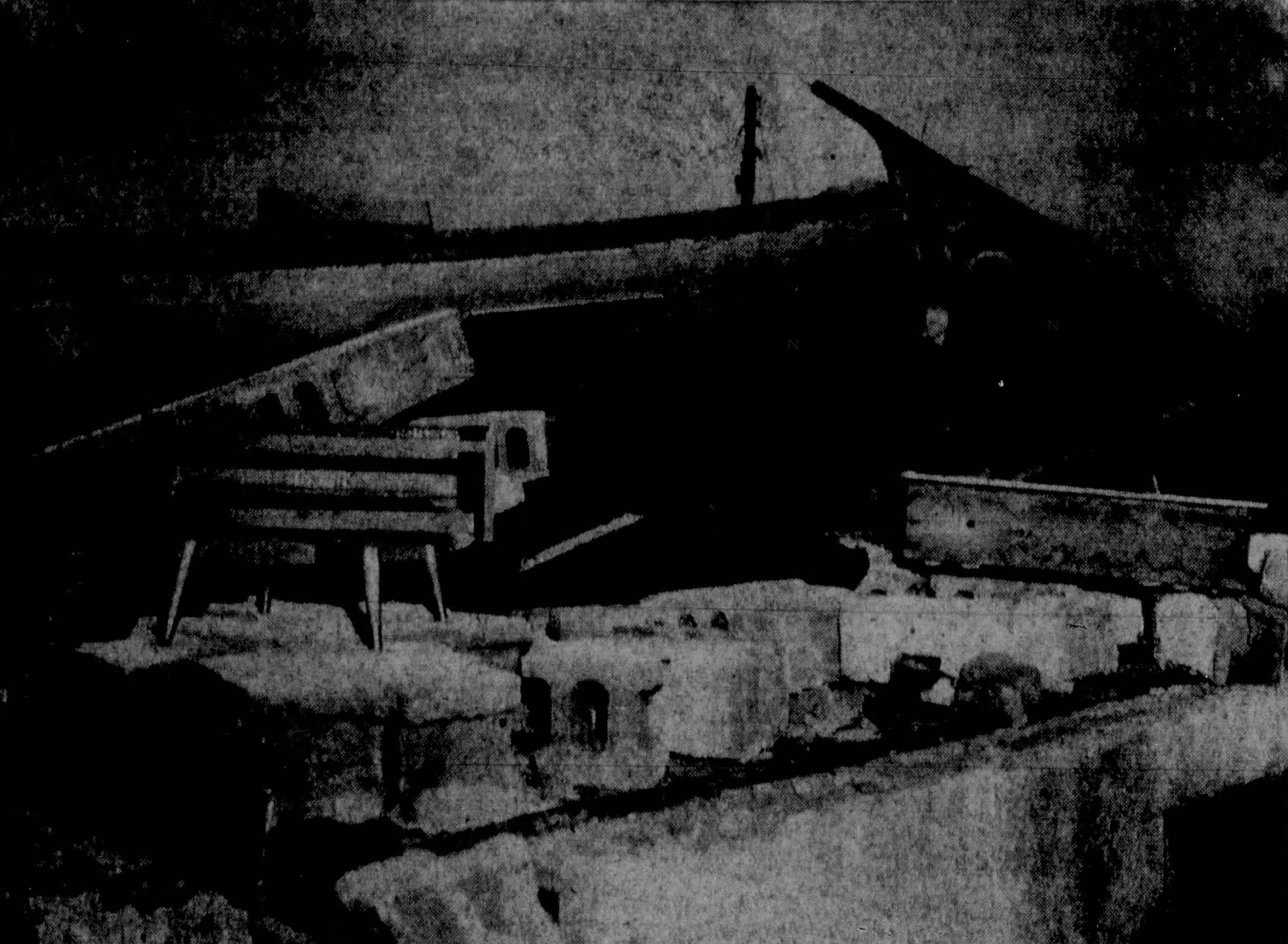
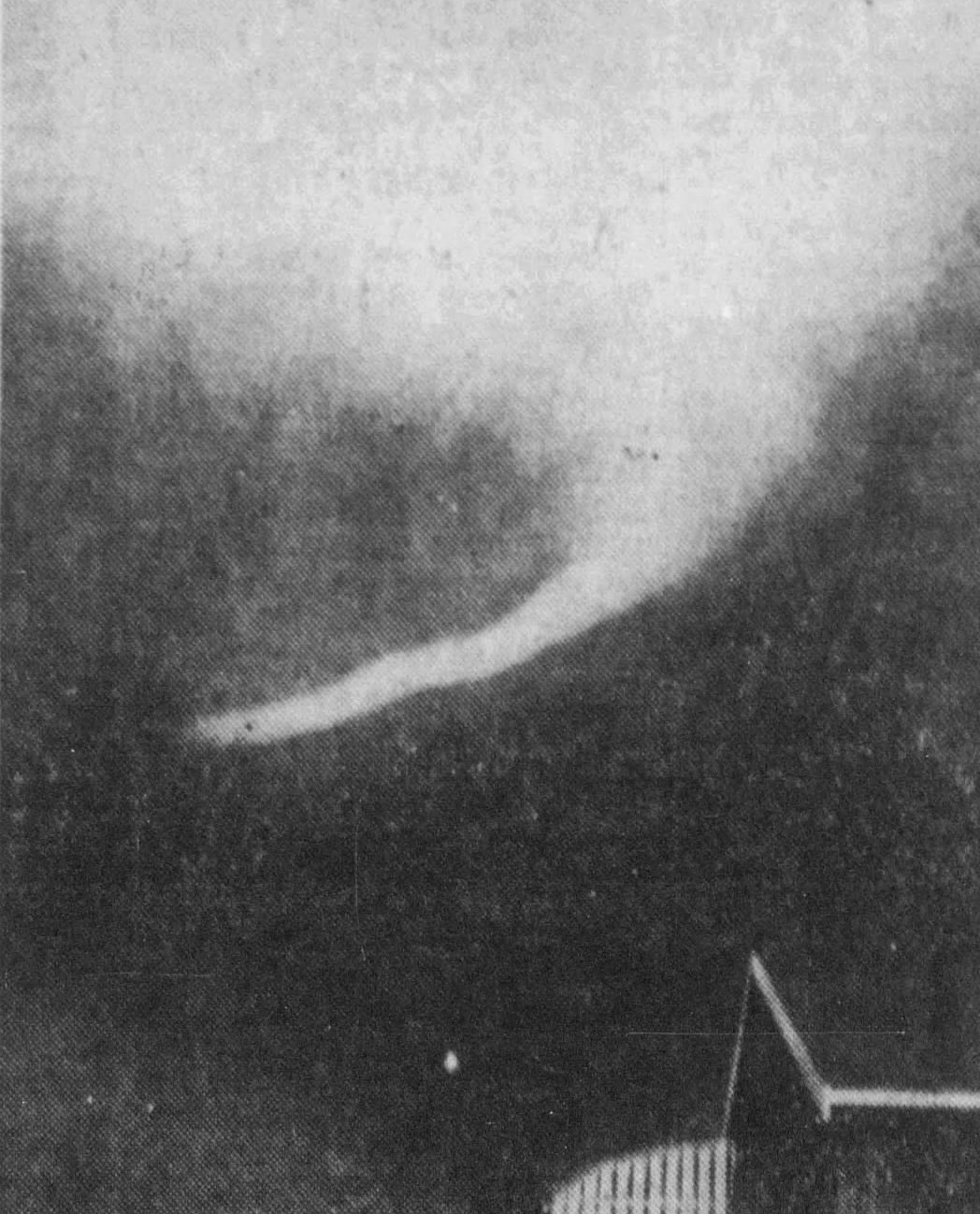
- Clockwise from top: A large F4 wedge tornado north of Newbury, Kansas on May 19; A high school in Sapulpa, Oklahoma after an F5 tornado on May 5; A leveled farmstead near Sidney, Nebraska after an F3 tornado on June 20; A thin rope tornado near Hubbard Lake, Michigan on July 16; A radar image showing a tornado-producing hook echo near Meriden, Kansas on May 19; Downtown Wilburton, Oklahoma after an F4 tornado on May 5.
- Timespan: 1960
- Maximum rated tornado: F5 tornado: Prague–Sapulpa, Oklahoma on May 5
- Tornadoes in U.S.: 616
- Damage (U.S.): Unknown
- Fatalities (U.S.): 46
- Fatalities (worldwide): >51

This page documents the tornadoes and tornado outbreaks of 1960, primarily in the United States. Most tornadoes form in the U.S., although some events may take place internationally. Tornado statistics for older years like this often appear significantly lower than modern years due to fewer reports or confirmed tornadoes.

== Events ==
Fatal United States tornadoes in 1960
- Approximate touchdown location of killer tornadoes in 1960
Summary of tornadoes
- April 12 – Texas (3 deaths)
- April 16 – Iowa (1 death)
- April 28 – Oklahoma (3 deaths)
- May 5 – Oklahoma (5 deaths)
- May 5 – Oklahoma (2 deaths)
- May 5 – Oklahoma (16 deaths)
- May 5 – Oklahoma (2 deaths)
- May 5 – Oklahoma (1 death)
- May 5 – Oklahoma (5 deaths)
- May 5 – Oklahoma (1 death)
- May 6 – Arkansas (1 death)
- May 19 – Kansas (1 death)
- June 15 – Nebraska (1 death)
- June 27 – Colorado (2 deaths)
- August 5 – Nebraska (1 death)
- October 31 – Florida (1 death)
Total fatalities: 46

=== United States yearly total ===
Confirmed tornadoes by Fujita rating
FU	F0	F1	F2	F3	F4	F5	Total
0	128	262	175	44	6	1	616

== January ==
There were 9 tornadoes confirmed in the US in January.

== February ==
There were 28 tornadoes confirmed in the US in February.

=== February 9 ===
FU	F0	F1	F2	F3	F4	F5
0	1	4	2	1	0	0

A small, but damaging outbreak of eight tornadoes impacted the Great Plains and Midwest. An F2 tornado hit southern Doe Run, Hamilton Town, and southeastern Farmington, Missouri. An F1 tornado then caused major damage and two injuries in Troy, Illinois. The worst tornado of the outbreak then struck Pleasant Grove west of Tupelo, Arkansas at F3 strength, injuring 10. The final major tornado of the outbreak was an F2 tornado that then hit West City, Frisco, and Dahlgren, Illinois, injuring one. In the end, the tornadoes injured 13.

== March ==
There were 28 tornadoes confirmed in the US in March.

=== March 8 ===
A rare F1 tornado touched down in West Stayton, Oregon, causing moderate damage but no casualties.

== April ==
There were 70 tornadoes confirmed in the US in April.

=== April 12–18 ===
FU	F0	F1	F2	F3	F4	F5
0	2	18	10	7	0	0

An outbreak sequence spawned 37 tornadoes across the Midwest and the Northeast. The first tornado of the outbreak occurred on April 12, when an F2 tornado struck Laverne, Oklahoma, injuring three. Later, another F2 tornado hit Friona, Texas injuring another three. That night, the worst tornado of the outbreak sequence moved through rural Castro County west of Hart, Texas at F3 intensity, killing three and injuring 32.

More isolated activity occurred over the next three days, but strong tornadoes continued to bring destructive and deadly weather. On April 13, an isolated, but strong F2 tornado struck rural Saline County, Kansas. The next day, a large, 833 yd (762 m) wide F3 tornado hit the towns of Alma, Dyer, and Mulberry, Arkansas, injuring three. That evening, another F3 tornado then hit Johnson County, Arkansas causing major damage. On April 15, a .25 mi (0.40 km) wide F3 tornado injured two near Louisburg, Kansas before growing to 500 yards (460 m) and passing near Cleveland, Missouri.

April 16 turned out to be the most prolific day of the outbreak as 21 tornadoes touched down. A 800 yd (730 m) wide F3 tornado moved through southern Hudson, far southern Waterloo, northern Washburn, Jesup, and Wise, Iowa, killing one and injuring five. Another F3 tornado then struck eastern Siloam Springs, injuring four. Later, a brief but strong F2 tornado injured one southeast of El Dorado, Kansas near Prospect. An F3 tornado then heavily damaged Princeton, Kansas. Another F2 tornado struck the eastern Wichita suburb of Augusta, Kansas, injuring one. Later, an F2 tornado injured two in Vinita, Oklahoma.

Tornado activity continued into Illinois during the early morning hours of April 17 with an F2 tornado damaging Edgewood, Mason, northern Elliottstown and Dieterich and an F1 tornado injured four in Urbandale. The outbreak ended on April 18 after an isolated, early-morning F1 tornado caused some minor damage southeast of Polhemustown, New Jersey. In the end, the outbreak sequence affected 11 states, killing four and injuring 60.

=== April 28–30 ===
FU	F0	F1	F2	F3	F4	F5
0	2	4	8	5	0	0

A very destructive outbreak of 19 tornadoes tore through the Great Plains, Midwest, and Mississippi Valley. It started with a destructive series of 13 tornadoes in the Oklahoma City and Wichita metropolitan areas. A destructive F3 tornado tore through areas southeast of Binger, Oklahoma. Kansas' lone tornado of the day then touched down and struck St. Mark northwest of Wichita at F3 strength, injuring six. Back in Oklahoma, four strong tornadoes touched down simitaneously in Grady County with the worst ones being an F2 tornado that injured one southeast of Pocasset and an F3 tornado that injured two north of that same town.

After a brief, one-hour lull in activity, multiple strong tornadoes tore through the Oklahoma City metro. An F3 tornado moved through areas northwest of Tuttle, injuring one. A very destructive F3 tornado then tore through southeastern Oklahoma City, just barely missing the downtown area before also striking Forest Park, Oklahoma. This tornado injured 57 people. Later, an F2 tornado struck southwestern Oklahoma City and Moore, injuring six. A 800 yards (730 m) wide F2 tornado then killed three and injured one near the town of Schoolton.

Limited tornado activity continued over the next two days. The strongest tornado to occur on April 29 was a massive, 1,667 yd (1,524 m) wide F2 tornado that struck Raymond and Panchoville, injuring four. The final tornado of the outbreak occurred the next day when an F1 tornado injured one near Morgan Park, Indiana. In the end, the outbreak affected five states, killing three and injuring 79.

== May ==
There were 201 tornadoes confirmed in the US in May.

=== May 4–6 ===
FU	F0	F1	F2	F3	F4	F5
0	7	21	26	10	4	1

A large outbreak sequence of 71 tornadoes affected the Midwest, Ozarks, High Plains, and Southeast. The first major tornado of the outbreak occurred on the afternoon of May 4, when an F3 tornado damaged farmland between Edson and Brewster, Kansas. Later, a 500 yd (460 m) wide F3 tornado tore through the northwestern Fort Worth suburbs of southeastern Lake Worth, Sansom Park, and Blue Mound, injuring 12. In Oklahoma, another F3 tornado struck the northwestern Oklahoma City suburbs of Warr Acres and The Village, injuring four. A violent F4 tornado then tore through areas west and north of Konawa, causing significant damage. Later, another F4 tornado produced a long, 30.8 miles (49.6 km) path that struck the towns of Soper and Ethel, injuring three.

May 5 ended up being the worst day of the outbreak sequence as large outbreak of 31 tornadoes hit the Great Plains, Ozarks and Midwest with Oklahoma taking the brunt of the destruction as several deadly tornadoes touched down across state during the mid-afternoon. It started when the strongest tornado of the year touched down and became a large, 800 yd (730 m) wide F5 storm as it tore through northern Tecumseh, eastern Shawnee (both of which had been hit by a long-tracked F3 tornado or tornado family earlier in the day), Prague, southeastern Kellyville, and Sapulpa, killing five and injuring 81 along its long 71.8 miles (115.6 km) track. Later, a short-lived, but strong F3 tornado struck Hoffman, killing two and injuring 15. Later, another long-tracked, violent F4 tornado became the deadliest of the outbreak when it struck Wilburton, western McCurtain, Keota, and southwestern Sallisaw, killing 16 and injuring 106 on its 62.4 miles (100.4 km) path. At the same time, a destructive F2 tornado hit Texanna and eastern Duchess Landing, killing two and injuring six.

More tornado activity continued into the evening and overnight hours and strong tornadoes began to hit other states, although the bulk of them remained in Oklahoma at first. An F3 tornado struck western Moffett and western West Fort Smith, killing one. A violent F4 tornado then ripped through Roland and Remy, killing five and injuring 13. The final Oklahoma tornado of the outbreak was an F3 tornado that blew through Bokoshe, Gans, and Akins, killing one. Early the next morning in Arkansas, a deadly F3 tornado struck Menifee, Wooster, Greenbrier, and southern Enders, killing one and injuring 30. An F2 then hit southeastern Formosa, injuring four. The last tornado to cause casualties occurred that afternoon when a large, 500 yd (460 m) wide F2 tornado ripped through Antioch and Searcy, injuring three.

In all, the tornado outbreak sequence affected 10 states, although 31 of the 71 tornadoes, including all five violent tornadoes, occurred in Oklahoma alone. A total of 33 people were killed and 302 others were injured.

=== May 13 ===
A rare F0 tornado touched down northeast of Klamath, California. There was no damage or casualties reported.

=== May 17–20 ===
FU	F0	F1	F2	F3	F4	F5
0	21	29	9	2	2	0

Another outbreak sequence of 63 tornadoes struck the Great Plains, Midwest, and Virginia with the bulk of the activity occurring on May 19. The first tornado to cause casualties was on May 18, when an F2 tornado injured one northeast of Orafino, Nebraska. The next day featured four catastrophic F3+ tornadoes all produced by the same supercell. An F4 tornado hit Wabaunsee, St. Marys, Kansas, injuring 12. This tornado was rated F5 by tornado researcher Thomas P. Grazulis based on two farms being swept away. The same cell produced another catastrophic F4 tornado that grew to .5 miles (0.80 km) wide and tore through Shawnee and Jefferson Counties, including the town of Ozawkie, killing one and injuring 92. The cell then dropped another significant F3 tornado that hit the town of Oskaloosa, injuring one. Later, the cell dropped another F3 tornado that hit the town of Springdale, causing another injury.

The next day saw only one tornado cause casualties when an F1 tornado moved through northern Bonham and White Shed, Texas, injuring one. Overall, the outbreak killed one and injured 108.

=== May 20 (Poland and Ukraine) ===
FU	F0	F1	F2	F3	F4	F5
5	1	0	0	1	1	0

A significant and deadly outbreak of eight tornadoes struck Southern Poland and Northern Ukraine. The worst event was a violent F4 tornado that struck the town of Niechobrz causing the total destruction of some houses and killing three people. The tornado may have reached F5 intensity as well. Two more fatalities were recorded from tornadoes in Dynów and Gorliczyna.

== June ==
There were 125 tornadoes confirmed in the US in June.

=== June 14–17 ===
FU	F0	F1	F2	F3	F4	F5
0	4	14	8	0	0	0

A tornado outbreak sequence affected the Great Plains and the Midwest, as well as Alabama. The main day of the outbreak was June 15, when 11 tornadoes touched down. An F1 tornado killed one and injured three in rural Phelps County, Nebraska. Another F1 tornado injured one in Freedom, Nebraska. Overall, a total of 26 tornadoes touched down, killing one and injuring four.

=== June 22–24 ===
FU	F0	F1	F2	F3	F4	F5
0	1	6	8	3	0	0

An outbreak of 18 tornadoes hit the Midwest, Great Plains, and Northeast. The first tornado occurred on June 22, when a brief, but strong 400 yd (370 m) wide F2 tornado northeast of Buford, Ohio. Later, another brief, but stronger F3 tornado caused major damage in North Terre Haute, Indiana. Early the next morning, a long-tracked F2 tornado tore through Virginia, Philadelphia, northern Gurney, northern Ashland, southwestern Pleasant Plains, southern Richland, southern Farmingdale, Riddle Hill, southwestern Springfield, and northern Toronto, Illinois, injuring one. June 24 featured back-to-back F3 tornadoes. The first one caused major damage as it moved through northern Trenton, northern Windsor, southern East Windsor, and western Etra, New Jersey. The second one, which was .25 miles (0.40 km) wide, then struck eastern Schenectady, Clifton Park Center and southern Ushers, New York, injuring nine. Overall, the outbreak injured 10.

=== June 25–28 ===
FU	F0	F1	F2	F3	F4	F5
0	5	5	3	3	0	0

A total of 16 tornadoes touched down in an widely scattered tornado outbreak sequence. On June 25, an unusually severe F0 tornado caused major damage and 34 injuries in Cimarron, New Mexico. This was the largest number of injuries ever recorded from an F0/EF0 tornado in the US. The next morning, an F2 tornado damaged Diboll and Shady Grove, Texas. June 27 saw an F3 tornado hit southeastern Sunol and southern Chappell, Nebraska, injuring one. A fatal F3 tornado then killed two and injured three in rural Sedgwick County, Colorado. The outbreak sequence ended the next day after a very destructive F3 tornado ripped through Morganfield, Breckinridge Center, and southern Waverly, Kentucky, injuring 12. Overall, the tornadoes killed two and injured 50.

=== June 29–30 ===
FU	F0	F1	F2	F3	F4	F5
0	3	9	3	0	0	0

There were 15 widely scattered tornadoes during the last two days of June with most of them occurring in the Kansas City and St Louis metropolitan areas. On June 29, an F2 tornado caused major damage in St. Joseph and northern Amity, Missouri. Early the next morning, another F2 tornado heavily damaged Alton, Hartford, South Roxana, and northeastern Glen Carbon, Illinois, injuring 17. That afternoon, a brief, but strong F2 tornado caused considerable damage in Old Bath, Indiana. In the end, the tornadoes caused 17 injuries.

== July ==
There were 42 tornadoes confirmed in the US in July.

== August ==
There were 48 tornadoes confirmed in the US in August.

=== August 5 ===
FU	F0	F1	F2	F3	F4	F5
0	0	1	0	1	0	0

An F3 tornado struck Elyria, Nebraska, killing one and injuring two. A brief, but damaging F1 tornado also hit Scotia, Nebraska.

== September ==
There were 21 tornadoes confirmed in the US in September.

=== September 11 (Hurricane Donna) ===
FU	F0	F1	F2	F3	F4	F5
0	0	2	1	1	0	0

Hurricane Donna spawned four tornadoes as it moved through the Carolinas, including two strong ones. The first one was an F3 tornado that tore west-northwest through northern Charleston, South Carolina, damaging or destroying numerous homes and injuring 10. The other was an F2 tornado that destroyed a dwelling in Butlers Crossroads, North Carolina, injuring all eight of its occupants. Overall, 18 people were injured by the tornadoes.

=== September 15–16 (Hurricane Ethel) ===
FU	F0	F1	F2	F3	F4	F5
0	1	2	2	0	0	0

Hurricane Ethel spawned five tornadoes in Florida and Alabama as it moved ashore along the Gulf Coast. On September 15, an F2 tornado damaged or destroyed 25 homes in Callaway and Springfield, Florida. The next day, an isolated, but strong F2 tornado injured two in Mignon, Alabama. In all, the tornadoes injured two people.

== October ==
There were 18 tornadoes confirmed in the US in October.

=== October 31 ===
An isolated, brief but strong and fatal F2 tornado struck Sanibel, Florida, killing one.

== November ==
There were 25 tornadoes confirmed in the US in November.

=== November 15 ===
FU	F0	F1	F2	F3	F4	F5
0	1	3	8	0	0	0

A destructive outbreak of mostly significant tornadoes hit the Great Plains and Mississippi Valley. A long-tracked F2 tornado caused major damage in northwestern Chili, northwestern Marshfield, southeastern McMillan, and western Rib Mountain, Wisconsin. Another F2 tornado then caused major destruction in Manchester, and Oneida, Iowa. In Missouri, yet another F2 tornado struck Russ, injuring three. At the same time, an F1 tornado caused significant damage in western Rolla and western Northwye, injuring one. The outbreak ended with a brief but damaging F1 tornado east of Black Fork, Arkansas. In all, 12 tornadoes touched down, injuring four.

=== November 27 ===
FU	F0	F1	F2	F3	F4	F5
0	0	4	4	1	0	0

An outbreak of eight tornadoes affected Kansas with an additional tornado occurring in Iowa. It started in Kansas, when an F1 tornado caused minor damage northwest of Spearville. Later, an F3 tornado slammed southern Concordia, injuring two. Another damaging F2 tornado then moved through Witchita suburbs, striking southeastern Mulvane, southeastern Rose Hill, and southern Augusta, injuring two. At the same time, a second F2 tornado damaged southeastern Grenola and northwestern Howard. The outbreak then ended with an F1 tornado that heavily damaged Clarinda, Iowa. In the end, four people were injured in the outbreak.

== December ==
There was 1 tornado confirmed in the US in December.

== See also ==
- Tornado
  - Tornadoes by year
  - Tornado records
  - Tornado climatology
  - Tornado myths
- List of tornado outbreaks
  - List of F5 and EF5 tornadoes
  - List of North American tornadoes and tornado outbreaks
  - List of 21st-century Canadian tornadoes and tornado outbreaks
  - List of European tornadoes and tornado outbreaks
  - List of tornadoes and tornado outbreaks in Asia
  - List of Southern Hemisphere tornadoes and tornado outbreaks
  - List of tornadoes striking downtown areas
  - List of tornadoes with confirmed satellite tornadoes
- Tornado intensity
  - Fujita scale
  - Enhanced Fujita scale
