= Walter T. Vahlberg =

American architect

Walter T. Vahlberg (March 4, 1897 - December 5, 1955) was an architect based in Oklahoma. Several of his works are listed on the National Register of Historic Places (NRHP).

He graduated from Massachusetts Institute of Technology in Cambridge, Massachusetts.

He served during World War I, training in aviation at Fort MacArthur in Waco, Texas; his parents lived in Oklahoma City, Oklahoma.

His works include:

- Yukon Public Library (1927), 512 Elm St., Yukon, OK (Sorey & Vahlberg), NRHP-listed
- First Christian Church (1929), 701 D Ave., Lawton, OK (Walter T. Vahlberg), NRHP-listed
- Gate School (1937–38), jct. of 4th and Texas, Gate, OK (Walter T. Vahlberg), NRHP-listed. Built by the Works Progress Administration, the school's design followed standardized plans for the WPA designed by Vahlberg.
- Pocasset Gymnasium, .5 mi. S of jct. of Dutton Rd. and OK 81, Pocasset, OK (Walter T. Vahlberg), NRHP-listed
- Cleveland County Courthouse, 200 S. Peters Ave., Norman, OK (Walter T. Vahlberg), NRHP-listed
- Kingfisher County Courthouse, designed by Vahlberg, whose construction was delayed by World War II. Vahlberg sued for and won, in 1947, payment for his services under the contract up to that point.

His remains are buried at Memorial Park Cemetery in Oklahoma City, Oklahoma.
