= May 1960 tornado outbreak sequence =

Weather event in the United States

Tornado outbreak sequence of May 4–6, 1960
Tornado outbreak
- Tornadoes: 71 confirmed
- Max. rating: F5 tornado
- Duration: 2 days, 1 hour, 50 minutes

Overall effects
- Fatalities: 33
- Injuries: 302
- Damage: $32.618 million (1960 USD) (Note: All losses are in 1960 USD unless otherwise noted.) $355 million (2025 USD)
- Areas affected: Midwestern and Southern United States, primarily Oklahoma and Arkansas
- Part of the tornadoes and tornado outbreaks of 1960

On May 4–6, 1960, a large tornado outbreak sequence affected parts of the Midwestern and Southern United States. (Note: An outbreak is generally defined as a group of at least six tornadoes (the number sometimes varies slightly according to local climatology) with no more than a six-hour gap between individual tornadoes. An outbreak sequence, prior to (after) the start of modern records in 1950, is defined as a period of no more than two (one) consecutive days without at least one significant (F2 or stronger) tornado.) The severe weather event produced at least 71 confirmed tornadoes, including five violent tornadoes in the U.S. state of Oklahoma. Major tornado activity began on the afternoon of May 4, with strong tornadoes affecting the Red River Valley and the Dallas-Fort Worth Metroplex. Two tornadoes struck parts of southern Oklahoma, causing significant damage to the Konawa and Soper areas. In all, at least 22 tornadoes formed between the early afternoon and late evening, with two more tornadoes forming early on May 5, shortly after midnight CDT. A much more significant tornado outbreak began on the afternoon of May 5 and continued overnight, spreading from eastern Oklahoma into portions of southern Missouri and Central Arkansas. At least 35 tornadoes developed between 6:00 a.m. CST on May 5–6, including a long-tracked F5 that struck rural areas in Northeastern Oklahoma and killed five people. Two other tornadoes killed 21 people in and near Sequoyah County in the eastern portion of the state. Other strong tornadoes affected the Little Rock metropolitan area early on May 6 in Arkansas. In all, the tornado outbreak sequence killed 33 people and injured 302.

== Background ==
Outbreak death toll
State	Total	County	County total
Arkansas	1	Conway	1
Oklahoma	32	Creek	5
Oklahoma	32	Haskell	3
Oklahoma	32	Latimer	13
Oklahoma	32	McIntosh	2
Oklahoma	32	Okmulgee	2
Oklahoma	32	Sequoyah	7
All deaths were tornado-related

== Confirmed tornadoes ==
Confirmed tornadoes by Fujita rating
FU	F0	F1	F2	F3	F4	F5	Total
5	5	20	26	10	4	1	71
"FU" denotes unclassified but confirmed tornadoes.

=== May 4 event ===
List of confirmed tornadoes – May 4, 1960
F#	Location	County	Time (UTC)	Path length	Damage
Texas
F0	W of Matador	Motley	2040	0.1 miles (0.16 km)	Funnel sighted, but only hit unpopulated land.
F2	W of Dublin	Erath	0010	0.3 miles (0.48 km)	Two roofs damaged. The tornado is not listed as significant by tornado researcher Thomas P. Grazulis.
F1	SW of Dublin	Erath	0020	0.2 miles (0.32 km)	A brick dairy farm and a garage were destroyed. Some roof damage occurred as well.
F0	NE of Mineral Wells	Palo Pinto	0120	1 mile (1.6 km)	Brief touchdown with numerous other funnels observed nearby.
F3	E of Lake Worth to NE of Blue Mound	Tarrant	0120	7.4 miles (11.9 km)	Eight homes were seriously damaged and five entirely destroyed. Two of the homes lost all except their interior walls.
F1	NE of Garner	Parker	0300	1.5 miles (2.4 km)	Major damage to farm machinery, outbuildings, and a home.
F1	S of Flower Mound	Denton	0400	2 miles (3.2 km)	Five minor injuries to people in a trailer home. The tornado was rated F2 by Grazulis.
F1	S of Sulphur Springs	Hopkins	0515	1 mile (1.6 km)	Two barns were destroyed, two others damaged, and two homes unroofed during "widespread" thunderstorms. The tornado was rated F2 by Grazulis.
Oklahoma
F1	SW of Grandfield	Tillman	2340	1 mile (1.6 km)	Trees were uprooted and one home damaged.
F1	S of Grandfield	Tillman	2340	1 mile (1.6 km)	Only damaged outbuildings.
F2	N of Walters	Cotton	0000	4.9 miles (7.9 km)	Storm hit the western edge of town. The tornado is not listed as significant by Grazulis.
F1	E of Medicine Park	Comanche	0030	0.1 miles (0.16 km)	Three people were injured as a tornado unroofed a barn and destroyed two trailers.
F1	S of Temple	Cotton	0043	0.1 miles (0.16 km)	Brief touchdown.
F1	SW of Central High	Comanche	0045	0.1 miles (0.16 km)	Two outbuildings destroyed and a home unroofed.
F3	E of Marlow	Stephens	0058	0.1 miles (0.16 km)	One home was shifted off its foundation and severely damaged. The tornado may have moved concrete blocks 100 yards (300 ft) from a gas station. The tornado was rated F2 by Grazulis.
F2	Noble area	Cleveland	0145	5.2 miles (8.4 km)	A restaurant and a barn were destroyed in Noble. The tornado also damaged a house and a gas station.
F3	NW of Ada to NE of Konawa	Pontotoc	0145	10 miles (16 km)	A large wedge tornado injured five people as it destroyed three homes and damaged 12.
F3	E of Bethany to N of The Village	Oklahoma	0155	5.1 miles (8.2 km)	A tornado destroyed 12 homes and damaged 25. It then struck and damaged a new terminal at Tulakes Airport.
F4	W of Konawa	Pottawatomie, Seminole	0205	8 miles (13 km)	A violent tornado, later rated as an F4, the first of multiple, passed between Konawa and Sacred Heart, Oklahoma, in both Pottawatomie and Seminole Counties, destroying four farms, and sweeping away a newly-built residence at F4 intensity. Nobody died however.
F4	S of Soper to S of Snow	Choctaw, Pushmataha	0316	30.8 miles (49.6 km)	After beginning south of Soper, Oklahoma, this violent tornado immediately reached F4 intensity, striking Soper directly, destroying a third of the town, including two farms and up to 100 homes. Near the end of the path, near Snow, the tornado destroyed another two farms; The path near Snow may have been a secondary tornado, indicating that this could’ve been a family of tornadoes. Despite the severe damages, and impacts to Soper, only three people were injured, but nobody died.
Kansas
F?	N of Edson to NW of Brewster (1st tornado)	Sherman	2320	7 miles (11 km)	
F?	SW of Arnold	Ness	2343	6 miles (9.7 km)	
F2	W of Brownell	Ness	2345	0.1 miles (0.16 km)	Brief tornado coincided with significant hail-related damage to crops. The tornado is not listed as significant by Grazulis.
F?	N of Edson (2nd tornado)	Sherman	0030	unknown	
Arkansas
F2	W of Amagon	Jackson	0300	1 mile (1.6 km)	A shed was destroyed and a house damaged. The tornado is not listed as significant by Grazulis.
Sources:, Storm Data

=== May 5 event ===
List of confirmed tornadoes – May 5, 1960
F#	Location	County	Time (UTC)	Path length	Damage
Texas
F2	E of Marshall	Harrison	0700	1.3 miles (2.1 km)	Trees were damaged and a vehicle overturned. The tornado is not listed as significant by Grazulis.
F0	SW of Carrollton	Dallas	0400	0.1 miles (0.16 km)	Brief touchdown reported.
F0	NE of Addison	Dallas	0437	0.1 miles (0.16 km)	Only hit one building and caused minor damage.
Arkansas
F2	Enola	Faulkner	1000	0.8 miles (1.3 km)	A home and a barn were destroyed. Two other buildings were damaged. The tornado is not listed as significant by Grazulis.
F2	NW of Winslow to Elkins	Washington	0330	16.9 miles (27.2 km)	Formed south of West Fork. Six homes and three stores were damaged in the Blackburn community. Only one home was completely destroyed.
F2	NE of Goshen to Alabam	Madison	0445	13.2 miles (21.2 km)	Farm homes and outbuildings were entirely destroyed.
F2	NW of Scotia	Johnson	0530	2 miles (3.2 km)	A brief tornado destroyed three homes. The tornado is not listed as significant by Grazulis.
Alabama
F1	NW of Chunchula to SE of Satsuma	Mobile	1300	11.5 miles (18.5 km)	Thousands of trees were downed and many homes and other structures were damaged.
Oklahoma
F?	S of Frederick	Tillman	1938	unknown	
F3	NE of Wallville to NE of Maysville	Garvin	2045	7.3 miles (11.7 km)	One frame home was destroyed, a few trailers, a general store, and a church were destroyed in the Wallville area. The tornado also damaged farms and a pipe yard near Maysville. The parent supercell produced the next event below.
F3	NE of Wayne to W of Sand Springs	Cleveland, Pottawatomie, Lincoln, Creek, Tulsa	2100	101.9 miles (164.0 km)	A long-lived tornado family destroyed five homes and hit a cemetery near Corbett, then destroyed two more homes and an oil tank in Tribbey. Six homes were hit in Depew and two more were destroyed west of Bristow. Near the end of the path, three homes and a trailer were destroyed.
F5	S of Shawnee to Prague to Iron Post to NE of Sapulpa	Pottawatomie, Lincoln, Okfuskee, Creek	2300	71.8 miles (115.6 km)	5 deaths — See section on this tornado.
F2	McAlester	Pittsburgh	0007	4.1 miles (6.6 km)	Most damage was at the rooftop level. One 208-foot (63 m) radio tower was reportedly "snapped off". The tornado is not listed as significant by Grazulis.
F3	S of Hoffman	Okmulgee	0016	0.8 miles (1.3 km)	2 deaths — About 25 homes were destroyed, some of which were swept away. Even underbrush was cleared from the homesites in south Hoffman. Grazulis gave this an F4 rating.
F2	SE of Haskell	Muskogee	0020	4.9 miles (7.9 km)	Most damage from hail up to 2 inches (5.1 cm) in diameter. The tornado is not listed as significant by Grazulis.
F2	NE of Vinita to W of Loma Linda, Missouri	Craig, Ottawa	0030	36.6 miles (58.9 km)	A large tornado nearly leveled a newly built brick farmhouse, leaving only one wall standing. The tornado also destroyed "two truckloads of boats" on the Will Rogers Turnpike, injuring two drivers. This tornado destroyed many farms and may have been an F3 in intensity.
F2	S of Wynnewood	Garvin	0100	5.9 miles (9.5 km)	"General damage" was observed near Wynnewood, with two homes, a barn, and a warehouse having been unroofed.
F4	S of Wilburton to SW of Sallisaw	Latimer, Haskell, Sequoyah	0110	62.4 miles (100.4 km)	16 deaths — See section on this tornado
F2	E of Eufaula to NE of Texanna	McIntosh	0110	11.7 miles (18.8 km)	2 deaths — Three homes were reported destroyed and six others damaged. All deaths and injuries were in vehicles. This tornado may have been an F3.
F2	SW of Wagoner	Wagoner	0120	5.1 miles (8.2 km)	A tornado destroyed seven homes, many businesses, and a radio tower in western Wagoner.
F1	S of Tiawah	Rogers	0130	0.1 miles (0.16 km)	Outbuildings were destroyed on a farm.
F3	W of Moffett	Sequoyah	0130	4.5 miles (7.2 km)	1 death — Pavement was torn from U.S. Route 64, several homes were destroyed, and a truck driver was killed.
F4	SW of Roland	Sequoyah	0140	5.4 miles (8.7 km)	5 deaths — One home was swept away and two trucks carried 300 yards (274 m). Three of the occupants were injured and five people died in the home that was swept away.
F1	NE of Park Hill to NW of Briggs	Cherokee	0240	4.6 miles (7.4 km)	A home, two stores, and numerous trees were damaged.
F2	Eufaula	McIntosh	0250	1 mile (1.6 km)	This was the second tornado to hit near Eufaula. 12 homes were damaged.
F2	NW of Langley to SW of Cleora	Mayes	0300	6.4 miles (10.3 km)	A tornado destroyed 12 cabins and three homes. A store, a church, and a school were also destroyed.
F3	SE of Bokoshe to NW of Akins	Le Flore, Sequoyah	0330	23.7 miles (38.1 km)	1 death — This was the fourth F3+ tornado to hit Sequoyah County this day. Numerous homes were destroyed and a woman was killed in one of them. Some of the homes were reportedly swept away.
Nebraska
F?	Leigh	Colfax	2230	unknown	
Missouri
F0	NE of Urbana	Dallas	2250	0.2 miles (0.32 km)	Two outbuildings were unroofed.
Iowa
F2	SE of Carroll to N of Scranton	Carroll, Greene	0100	13.8 miles (22.2 km)	Destroyed homes and barns along a skipping path.
F1	SE of Dallas Center	Dallas	0330	1 mile (1.6 km)	$10,000 damage to farms was estimated.
Sources:, Storm Data

=== May 6 event ===
List of confirmed tornadoes – May 6, 1960
F#	Location	County	Time (UTC)	Path length	Damage
Missouri
F1	Macks Creek	Camden	0630	0.2 miles (0.32 km)	There was damage to many farms and trees.
F2	SW of Ava	Christian	0645	5.7 miles (9.2 km)	A tornado struck eight farms and shifted one home on its foundation. Many other homes and barns were heavily damaged. This tornado may have been an F3.
Arkansas
F3	NW of Toad Suck to S of Enders	Conway, Faulkner	0700	26.7 miles (43.0 km)	1 death — Developed west of Conway, in the Portland Bottoms area. The tornado then hit Menifee, destroying a large school complex, 31 houses, a pair of churches, a post office, and 32 other structures. Much damage was also reported in Greenbrier. 30 people were injured.
F2	NE of Austin to E of Choctaw	Van Buren	0730	8.2 miles (13.2 km)	A tornado destroyed a small home.
F1	W of Cammack Village	Pulaski	0735	3.3 miles (5.3 km)	A tornado damaged many homes and trees in west Little Rock.
F2	College Station	Pulaski	0800	10.3 miles (16.6 km)	A tornado passed 3 miles (4.8 km) southeast of Little Rock, unroofing structures, destroying barns, and damaging homes.
F2	W of Prescott	Nevada	0815	2.6 miles (4.2 km)	A tornado uprooted many trees and destroyed three homes. It also destroyed a cotton gin and a garage. Other garages, outbuildings, and 60 other homes were reported damaged. Two people were injured.
F2	NE of Kingsland to NW of Glendale	Cleveland, Lincoln	0915	19.3 miles (31.1 km)	A tornado destroyed one home near the end of its path. A nearby high school was badly damaged.
F2	S of Antioch to E of Searcy	White	2000	14.6 miles (23.5 km)	A tornado unroofed or damaged many homes and businesses in the business district of Searcy.
F1	W of Dell to NW of Yarbro	Mississippi	2200	14 miles (23 km)	A tornado skipped through the Blytheville area, causing minor damage to farms, small buildings, roofs, and windows. It, or another member of its tornado family, may have touched down in Pemiscot County, Missouri. It was attended by approximately 15 funnel clouds, eight of which may have been brief tornadoes.
Illinois
F1	SE of Flora	Clay	1430	1 mile (1.6 km)	An airport hangar was damaged.
F1	E of Long Creek	Macon	1540	0.3 miles (0.48 km)	Three farms were damaged.
F1	E of Carrollton to NW of Chatham	Greene, Macoupin, Morgan, Sangamon	1905	43.5 miles (70.0 km)	Isolated patches of scattered damage were reported.
F2	W of Loxa to NE of Oakland	Coles, Douglas	2230	20.9 miles (33.6 km)	Only one barn and grain bins were destroyed.
Mississippi
F1	Lexie to S of Kokomo	Walthall	1930	12.3 miles (19.8 km)	A tornado destroyed five homes and eight other buildings. Twenty homes were severely damaged. The tornado may have been an F2 rather than an F1.
Sources:, Storm Data

=== Prague–Iron Post–Sapulpa, Oklahoma ===
Prague–Iron Post–Sapulpa, Oklahoma
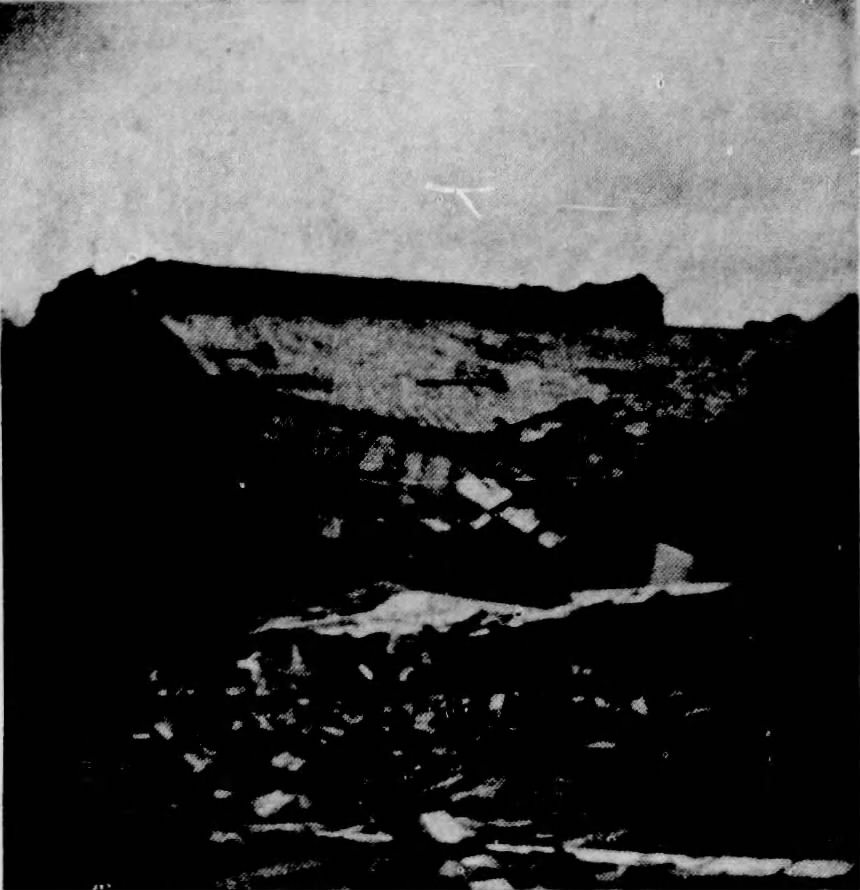
- The Sapulpa High School after the tornado.

Meteorological history
- Formed: May 5, 1960, 5:27 p.m. CDT (UTC–05:00)
- Dissipated: May 5, 1960, 7:00 p.m. CDT (UTC–05:00)
- Duration: 1 hour, 33 minutes

F5 tornado
- on the Fujita scale
- Highest winds: 261–318 mph (420–512 km/h)

Overall effects
- Fatalities: 5
- Injuries: 81

This large and violent tornado began near Shawnee and finally lifted to NE of Sapulpa during the afternoon hours. On the ground, roughly 1hr., 45 minutes, the 800-yard wide funnel was described as a rapidly moving white barrel that never "left the landscape." In the northeastern regions of Prague, Oklahoma, the tornado caused $750,000 in losses to an oil refinery before passing near Paden at F4 intensity. Two of the 5 killed were at the Iron Post community. Multiple homes and farms were swept away and granulated or heavily damaged, with destruction of the trees nearby and fields torn to shreds with heavy scour. The tornado then tracked through parts of Sapulpa around 6:32 pm, claiming 3 more lives and injuring dozens more (81 overall). Over 300 homes were destroyed or damaged along with many buildings such as schools, churches, and businesses over a 15 city block area, though the most intense phases of the tornado occurred over mostly rural land, it could not have been any lower than F4/F5 at Sapulpa. In Sapulpa, some homes were swept away along with their old foundations and porches. Overall casualties were 5 killed, 81 inj. As of now, this is also the most intense tornado to occur within the Tulsa area. The hardest hit major population area was Sapulpa. The tornado lifted shortly before 7 pm, and was observed aloft over Tulsa. The tornado was the main event of a potent days long outbreak.

=== Wilburton, Oklahoma ===
Wilburton, Oklahoma
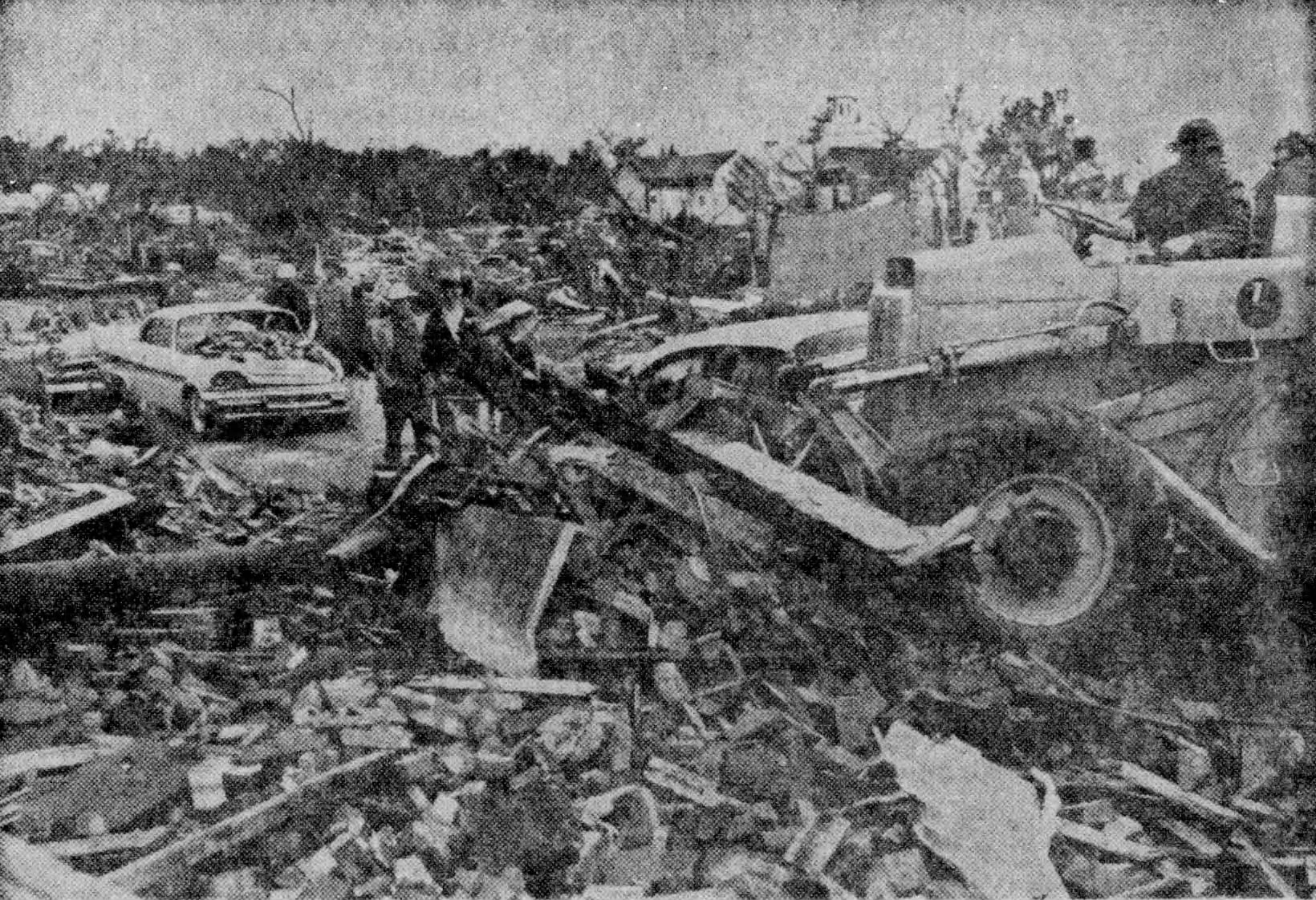
- Downtown Wilburton after the tornado.

Meteorological history
- Formed: May 5, 1960, 7:10 p.m. CDT (UTC–05:00)
- Dissipated: May 5, 1960; Unknown

F4 tornado
- on the Fujita scale
- Highest winds: 207–260 mph (333–418 km/h)

Overall effects
- Fatalities: 16 (Deadliest of 1960)
- Injuries: 106

What was most certainly a family of tornadoes first began south of Wilburton, Oklahoma, and moved north-northeast, tracking into that town as an F4 tornado. Near total destruction occurred along a two-block swath of town. 13 were killed at Wilburton as 600 buildings were damaged or destroyed, including 82 homes that were destroyed, some of which incurred F4-rated damage. Losses at Wilburton totalled $1,500,000. The tornado continued on its northerly track, where six more homes were destroyed at Center Point, before the tornado "skipped" into the town of Keota, where three more people were killed, and 25 more buildings were destroyed. 10 more homes were damaged south of Sallisaw, before the tornado lifted as it hit town. In all, 16 people were killed, 106 sustained injuries. Losses totalled well over $1,500,000, however, not much information is able to be found on the devastation outside of Wilburton, as that town received more media attention.

== See also ==
- List of North American tornadoes and tornado outbreaks
- Tornado outbreak sequence of April 28 – May 2, 1953
- Tornado outbreak sequence of May 3–9, 1961
