= Bailey, Oklahoma =

- Unincorporated community
- Location within Oklahoma Location within the United States
- Coordinates: 34°42′58″N 97°47′53″W
- Country: United States
- State: Oklahoma
- County: Grady
- Time zone: UTC-6 (Central (CST))
  - Summer (DST): UTC-5 (CDT)
- GNIS feature ID: 1100188

Bailey is a ghost town in Grady County, Oklahoma, United States.

== Geography ==
It was 12 miles northeast of Marlow.

== History ==
The Bailey post office was established on June 25, 1892. It was named after J. J. Bailey, a wagon master on a stage line to Fort Sill.

In 1902, a 32.5 acres (0.132 km^{2}) town plat was created. Bailey was soon home to a cotton gin, Methodist church, school, a general store, a blacksmith shop, a drug store, and two doctors.

The post office closed on September 30, 1932.

By 1949, it was remarked that "there is nothing at this place to remind one of a former town."

== See also ==
- Agawam, Oklahoma
