= Grady County, Oklahoma =

County in Oklahoma, United States

- County
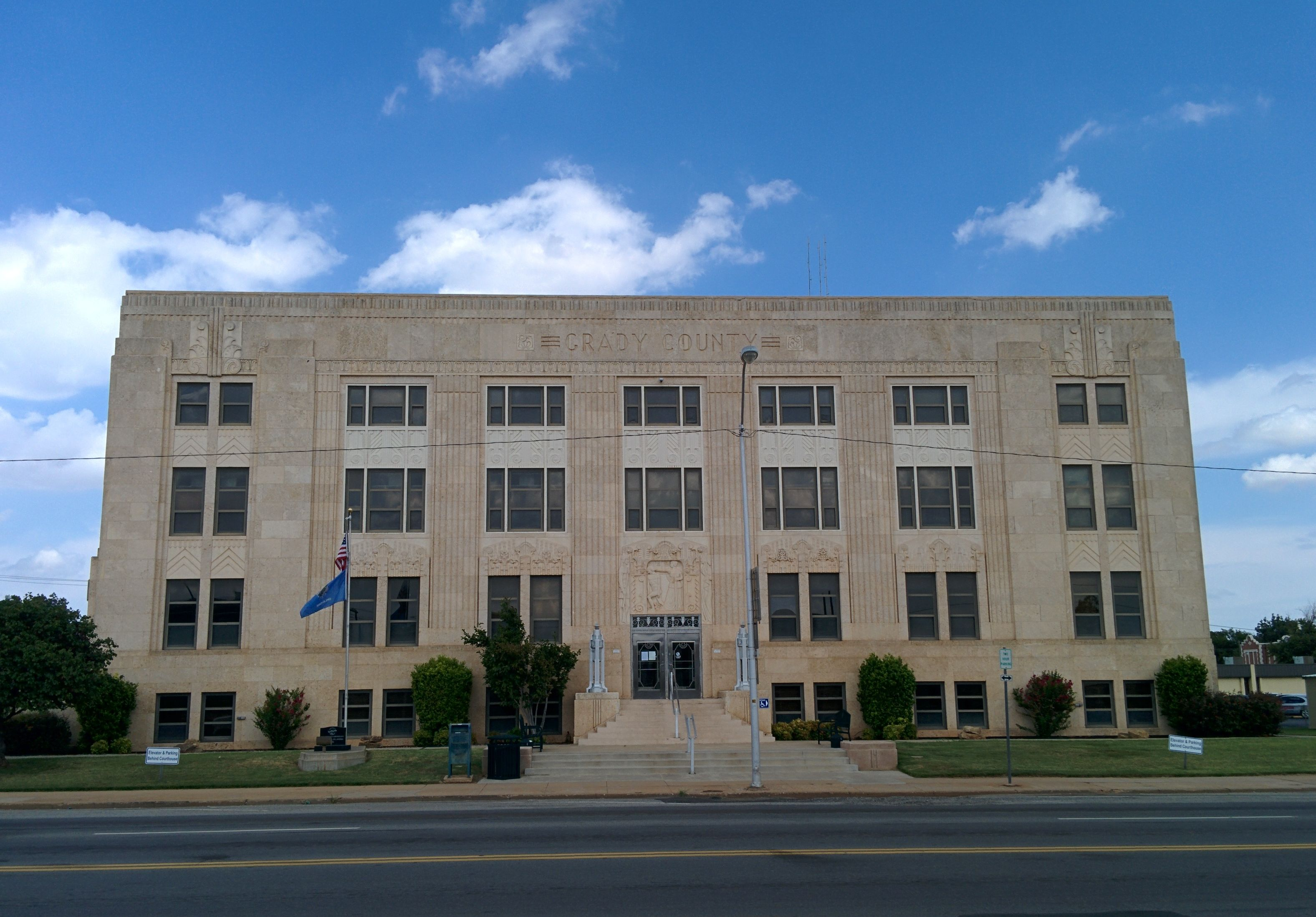
- Grady County Courthouse in Chickasha (2014)

- Location within the U.S. state of Oklahoma
- Coordinates: 35°01′N 97°53′W
- Country: United States
- State: Oklahoma
- Founded: 1907
- Named for: Henry W. Grady
- Seat: Chickasha
- Largest city: Chickasha

Area
  - Total: 1,105 sq mi (2,860 km^{2})
  - Land: 1,100 sq mi (2,800 km^{2})
  - Water: 4.4 sq mi (11 km^{2}) 0.4%

Population (2020)
  - Total: 54,795
  - Estimate (2025): 59,128 ▲
  - Density: 50/sq mi (19/km^{2})
- Time zone: UTC−6 (Central)
  - Summer (DST): UTC−5 (CDT)
- Congressional district: 4th
- Website: www.gradycountyok.com

Grady County is a county located in the U.S. state of Oklahoma. As of the 2020 census, its population was 54,795. Its county seat is Chickasha. It was named for Henry W. Grady, an editor of the Atlanta Constitution and Southern orator.

Grady County is part of the Oklahoma City metropolitan area.

== History ==
Grady County was part of the land given to the Choctaw by the Treaty of Dancing Rabbit Creek, in exchange for property in the Southeastern United States. In 1837, the Chickasaw joined the Choctaws, and in 1855, a treaty separated the two tribes, and the Chickasaw acquired an area that included much of Grady County. Most of the present Grady County became a part of Pickens County in the Chickasaw Nation.

Before the Civil War, Randolph B. Marcy blazed the California Road through this area, reporting a Waco and a Wichita village. In 1858, while the Comanches were holding a meeting with the Wichita, Choctaw, and Chickasaw, federal troops attacked a party of Comanches. Although the commander of Fort Arbuckle had been informed about the meeting, the troops' commander, Major Earl Van Dorn, had not consulted him before the attack. As a result, the troops killed 60 Comanches and four Wichitas. Fearing a Comanche reprisal, the other tribes fled to safety at Fort Arbuckle. At the end of the Civil War, the Five Civilized Tribes and the Caddo, Delaware, Kiowa, Comanche, Apache, Cheyenne, Arapaho, and Osage signed a peace agreement and pledged to stand united against any unjust demands that the federal government made at the war's end. The agreement was known as the Camp Napoleon Compact.

The first railroad in this area was built to the town of Minco in 1890 by the Chicago, Kansas and Nebraska Railway. The company was acquired by the Chicago, Rock Island and Pacific Railroad (Rock Island) during the following year. In 1892, the Rock Island built a track connecting Chickasha, Ninnekah, and Rush Springs to the Texas border. The same railroad built a line from Chickasha to Mangum in 1900. The Oklahoma City and Western Railroad (sold to the St. Louis and San Francisco Railway in 1907) constructed tracks from Oklahoma City to Chickasha, which it extended to the Texas border in the following year. Between 1906 and 1910, the Oklahoma Central Railway (sold to the Atchison, Topeka and Santa Fe Railway in 1914) built from Lehigh to Chickasha.

The 1898 Curtis Act stripped the Chickasaw Nation of its authority, and communal land was forced into allotment, paving the way for statehood. When Oklahoma acquired statehood in 1907, the Chickasaw Nation ceased to exist, Grady County was organized, and Chickasha was named the county seat. In 1911, Grady County annexed Washington, Prairie Valley, and the northern section of Dutton townships formerly in Caddo County, Oklahoma.

== Geography ==
According to the U.S. Census Bureau, the county has a total area of 1,105 square miles (2,860 km^{2}), of which 4.4 square miles (11 km^{2}), 0.4%, are covered by water. The county lies in the Red Bed Plains and is mostly covered with rolling prairie. The Canadian River forms the northern boundary and the Washita River runs through the middle.

=== Major highways ===
- Interstate 44 / H.E. Bailey Turnpike
  - Norman Spur
- U.S. Highway 62
- U.S. Highway 81
- U.S. Highway 277
- State Highway 4
- State Highway 9
- State Highway 17
- State Highway 19
- State Highway 37
- State Highway 39
- State Highway 92
- State Highway 152

=== Adjacent counties ===
- Canadian County (north)
- McClain County (east)
- Garvin County (southeast)
- Stephens County (south)
- Comanche County (southwest)
- Caddo County (west)

== Demographics ==
Historical population
Census	Pop.	Note	%±
1910	30,309		—
1920	33,943		12.0%
1930	47,638		40.3%
1940	41,116		−13.7%
1950	34,872		−15.2%
1960	29,590		−15.1%
1970	29,354		−0.8%
1980	39,490		34.5%
1990	41,747		5.7%
2000	45,516		9.0%
2010	52,431		15.2%
2020	54,795		4.5%
2025 (est.)	59,128	▲	7.9%
U.S. Decennial Census; 1790-1960 1900-1990; 1990-2000 2010

=== 2020 census ===
As of the 2020 United States census, the county had a population of 54,795. Of the residents, 24.0% were under 18 and 16.9% were 65 or older; the median age was 39.6 years. For every 100 females, there were 99.7 males, and for every 100 females 18 and over, there were 97.0 males.

The racial makeup of the county was 78.7% White, 2.4% Black or African American, 5.6% American Indian and Alaska Native, 0.4% Asian, 2.2% from some other race, and 10.7% from two or more races. Hispanic or Latino residents of any race comprised 6.4% of the population.

Of the 20,416 households in the county, 33.5% had children under 18 living with them, and 21.5% had a female householder with no spouse or partner present. About 22.9% of all households were made up of individuals, and 11.1% had someone living alone who was 65 or older.

The county had 23,024 housing units, of which 11.3% were vacant. Among occupied housing units, 76.7% were owner-occupied and 23.3% were renter-occupied. The homeowner vacancy rate was 1.9% and the rental vacancy rate was 14.4%.

=== 2000 census ===
As of the 2000 census, 45,516 people, 17,341 households, and 12,797 families were residing in the county. The population density was 41 inhabitants per square mile (16/km^{2}). The 19,444 housing units had an average density of 18 units per square mile (6.9/km^{2}). The racial makeup of the county was 87.31% White, 3.06% African American, 4.85% Native American, 0.34% Asian, 0.04% Pacific Islander, 1.12% from other races, and 3.28% from two or more races. About 2.89% of the population were Hispanics or Latinos of any race.

Of the 17,341 households, 34.7% had children under 18 living with them, 60.5% were married couples living together, 9.7% had a female householder with no husband present, and 26.2% were not families; 22.9% of all households were made up of individuals, and 10.5% had someone living alone who was 65 or older. The average household size was 2.58, and the average family size was 3.02.

In the county, the age distribution was 26.7% under 18, 9.3% from 18 to 24, 27.7% from 25 to 44, 23.2% from 45 to 64, and 13.1% who were 65 or older. The median age was 36 years. For every 100 females, there were 95.3 males. For every 100 females 18 and over, there were 91.3 males.

The median income in the county for a household was $32,625 and for a family was $39,636. Males had a median income of $30,306 versus $21,108 for females. The per capita income for the county was $15,846. About 10.4% of families and 13.9% of the population were below the poverty line, including 16.9% of those under 18 and 14.6% of those 65 or over.

== Politics ==
Voter Registration and Party Enrollment as of June 30, 2023
Party	Number of Voters	Percentage
Democratic	6,956	20.48%
Republican	21,586	63.56%
Others	5,420	15.96%
Total	33,962	100%

United States presidential election results for Grady County, Oklahoma
Year	Republican		Democratic		Third party(ies)	
Year	No.	%	No.	%	No.	%
1908	1,491	32.38%	2,826	61.38%	287	6.23%
1912	1,121	25.08%	2,577	57.65%	772	17.27%
1916	1,272	23.75%	3,243	60.55%	841	15.70%
1920	3,403	41.71%	4,277	52.43%	478	5.86%
1924	2,640	30.75%	5,091	59.29%	855	9.96%
1928	6,332	62.64%	3,667	36.27%	110	1.09%
1932	2,034	18.03%	9,247	81.97%	0	0.00%
1936	3,013	24.90%	9,025	74.59%	61	0.50%
1940	4,299	34.62%	8,075	65.03%	43	0.35%
1944	4,069	34.55%	7,689	65.28%	20	0.17%
1948	2,882	26.16%	8,136	73.84%	0	0.00%
1952	6,348	45.16%	7,710	54.84%	0	0.00%
1956	5,191	43.39%	6,773	56.61%	0	0.00%
1960	5,913	52.06%	5,446	47.94%	0	0.00%
1964	3,569	31.97%	7,593	68.03%	0	0.00%
1968	4,242	38.15%	4,760	42.81%	2,117	19.04%
1972	7,762	67.50%	3,440	29.92%	297	2.58%
1976	4,686	39.20%	7,155	59.85%	114	0.95%
1980	8,131	58.20%	5,330	38.15%	510	3.65%
1984	11,042	69.19%	4,846	30.36%	72	0.45%
1988	7,994	53.84%	6,689	45.05%	165	1.11%
1992	6,997	39.40%	6,177	34.79%	4,583	25.81%
1996	7,228	46.34%	6,256	40.11%	2,114	13.55%
2000	10,040	61.69%	6,037	37.09%	199	1.22%
2004	14,136	70.31%	5,970	29.69%	0	0.00%
2008	15,195	73.35%	5,520	26.65%	0	0.00%
2012	14,833	75.61%	4,786	24.39%	0	0.00%
2016	17,316	77.70%	3,882	17.42%	1,088	4.88%
2020	18,538	80.25%	4,144	17.94%	419	1.81%
2024	20,378	80.60%	4,536	17.94%	369	1.46%

== Communities ==
=== Cities ===
- Blanchard (partially in McClain County)
- Chickasha (county seat)
- Minco
- Tuttle

=== Towns ===
- Alex
- Amber
- Bradley
- Bridge Creek
- Ninnekah
- Norge
- Pocasset
- Rush Springs
- Verden

=== Census-designated place ===
- Middleberg

=== Unincorporated communities ===
- Cox City
- Tabler

=== Ghost towns ===
- Agawam
- Acme
- Bailey

== Education ==
K-12 school districts in the county include:

- Alex Public Schools
- Amber-Pocasset Public Schools
- Blanchard Public Schools
- Bray-Doyle Public Schools
- Bridge Creek Public Schools
- Cement Public Schools
- Central High Public Schools
- Chickasha Public Schools
- Dibble Public Schools
- Fletcher Public Schools
- Lindsay Public Schools
- Marlow Public Schools
- Minco Public Schools
- Newcastle Public Schools
- Ninnekah Public Schools
- Rush Springs Public Schools
- Sterling Public Schools
- Tuttle Public Schools
- Verden Public Schools

Elementary school districts include:

- Friend Public School
- Middleberg Public School
- Pioneer Public School

== NRHP sites ==
These sites in Grady County are listed on the National Register of Historic Places:

- Chickasha Downtown Historic District, Chickasha
- Grady County Courthouse, Chickasha
- Griffin House, Chickasha
- Jewett Site, Bradley
- Knippelmeir Farmstead, Minco vicinity
- Minco Armory, Minco
- New Hope Baptist Church, Chickasha
- Oklahoma College for Women Historic District, Chickasha
- Pocasset Gymnasium, Pocasset
- Rock Island Depot, Chickasha
- Silver City Cemetery, Tuttle
- US Post Office and Federal Courthouse, Chickasha
- Verden Separate School, originally in Verden but relocated to Chickasha

== Notable people ==
- Tomassa (c. 1840–1900), translator
