= Agawam, Oklahoma =

- Ghost town
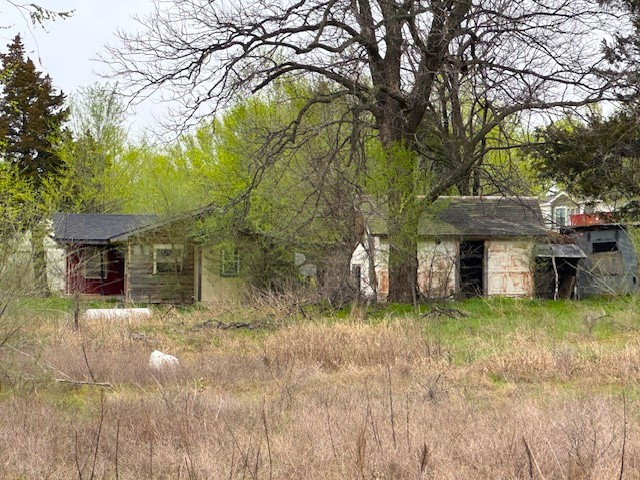
- Old Houses at Agawam in March 2025

- Location within Oklahoma Location within the United States
- Coordinates: 34°52′24″N 97°56′46″W
- Country: United States
- State: Oklahoma
- County: Grady
- Elevation: 1,240 ft (380 m)

Population (1960)
  - Total: 35
- Time zone: UTC-6 (Central (CST))
  - Summer (DST): UTC-5 (CDT)
- GNIS feature ID: 1093811

Agawam is a ghost town in Grady County, Oklahoma. Multiple abandoned houses remain in the town.

== Geography ==
Agawam is located adjacent to US Highway 81, near the junction with County Road 1490.

== History ==
Agawam was founded around 1909, when its post office was built. Agawam was named after a Native American village in New England. The community was located on the main line of the Rock Island Railroad.

On 19 October 1915, two Rock Island trains collided head-on here, a southbound passenger train and a northbound freight train, resulting in seven fatalities and numerous injuries; engineer William Powell was blamed for the accident. The Agawam post office closed in 1918.

In October 1922, it was announced that Agawam would become a shipping point for a gas field in Grady County, due to its location: four miles from the Oklahoma Gas Company's pumping station, and on the Rock Island main line. Agawam was described as a "new oil town" in 1923, when an auction of town lots was held.

A gymnasium was completed in 1935. (Note: The gymnasium is still in existence.) In 1955, Agawam had a grade school with a "small enrollment", but it was large enough to field a very good girls' basketball team that, over the course of three years, had amassed 90 wins against four losses, despite usually only having seven players.

== See also ==
- Acme, Oklahoma
