= Tomassa =

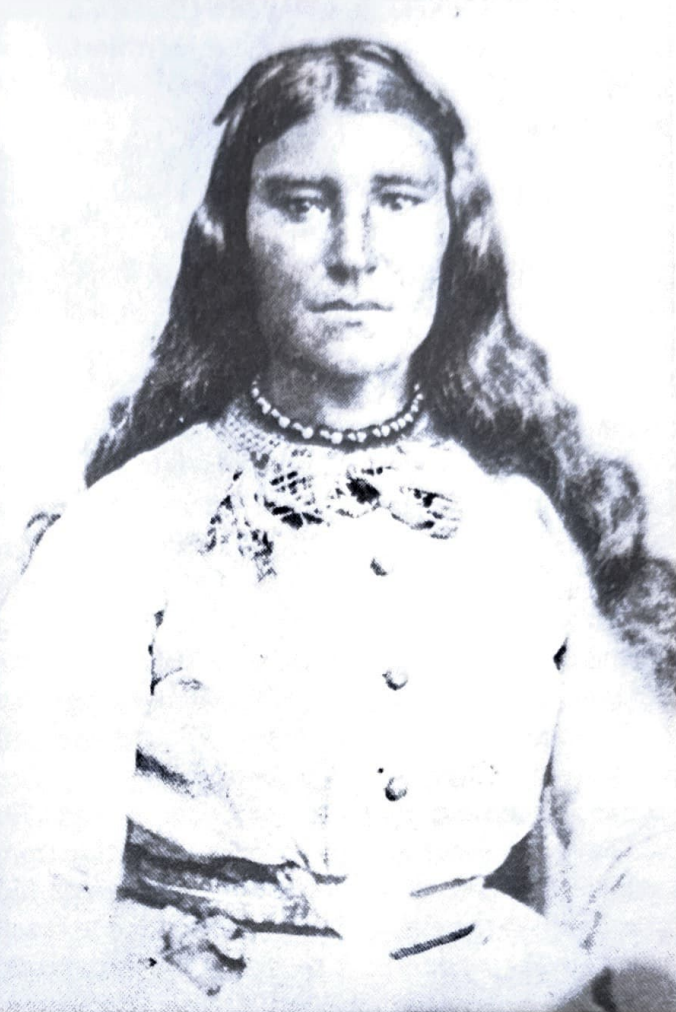
- Born: c. 1840; Centralist Republic of Mexico
- Died: 1900; Oklahoma, U.S.
- Occupation: Translator
- Employer: Fort Sill

Tomassa Chandler Conover (c. 1840 – 1900) was a Mexican-American woman who was captured by the Comanche as a child and later integrated into their society. She supported the Fort Sill Indian Agency by helping establish the Fort Sill Agency School, working there as a translator. Tomassa aided in communication between the fort and the Comanche and was known for her compassion and humanitarian efforts.

== Life ==
Tomassa was born c. 1840 into a well-off family in the Centralist Republic of Mexico. As a young child, she and her older cousin were captured by the Carissa Comanche. They spent a decade with the Comanche and became fully integrated into their society before being ransomed by the Bureau of Indian Affairs and returned to Mexico. No one came to claim them, so they were taken in by a wealthy Mexican family who treated them as servants. She enrolled in school but chose to return to the Comanche. Accompanied by a schoolmate, Tomassa crossed the Mexico–United States border. She relied on the stars for navigation and survived by killing their horses for food and making moccasins from their hides.

At around fourteen, Tomassa's Comanche mother arranged for her to marry a man named Blue Leggings. Contrary to Comanche traditions, Tomassa refused and instead chose to marry Joseph Chandler (1823–73), a half-Cherokee, half-white farmer near what would become Fort Sill in Oklahoma. Chandler bought her from Blue Leggings for three dollars and a rooster. During the American Civil War, their land was devastated by raiders, and the Chandlers relocated to Texas, returning to Oklahoma in 1868. The couple lived near Fort Cobb, Oklahoma, where they raised several children and provided beef to the Kiowa-Comanche Agency and the U.S. Army during the post-Civil War period. In 1867, after the signing of the Medicine Lodge Treaty, Joseph Chandler received a 320-acre headright under the treaty’s provisions. This headright was located about thirty miles northeast of Fort Sill. The Chandlers became one of the first families to benefit from the treaty.

Tomassa supported the Fort Sill Indian Agency by helping establish the Fort Sill Agency School. In 1871, she began working at the school as a translator. Fluent in Spanish, English, Comanche, and Caddo, she played a crucial role in assisting the fort's officials and maintaining communication with the Comanche, which helped in preventing raids.

Following Joseph Chandler’s death in 1873, Tomassa became involved with the Quaker-run school established at the Kiowa-Comanche Agency. She worked as both a student and an interpreter at the school. During this time, she played a role in protecting a Mexican couple who had been captured by the Comanche as children. Tomassa hid them from their pursuers in her home and later surrendered them to Indian Agent Lawrie Tatum. Tomassa was known for her compassion, which earned her respect from both the Indian agents and the Comanche.

Tomassa was a widow with four children. She later married George Conover, a retired army officer, and had several more children. In 1887, she converted to Christianity and joined the Methodist church. Tomassa died in 1900 and was buried on her ranch in western Grady County, Oklahoma.
