= First Christian Church (Lawton, Oklahoma) =

Historic church in Oklahoma, United States

- U.S. National Register of Historic Places
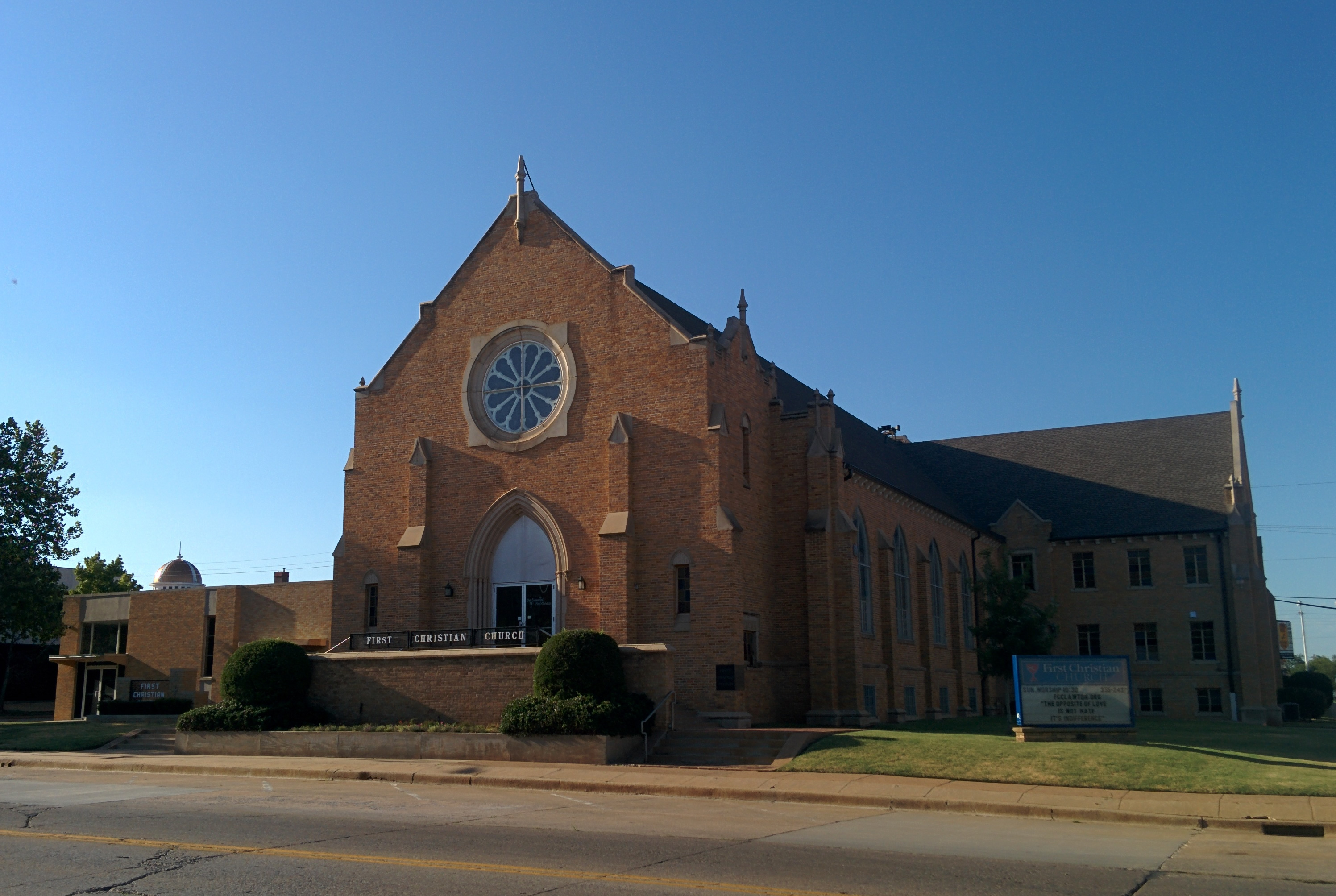

- Location within Oklahoma Location within the United States
- Location: 701 D Ave., Lawton, Oklahoma
- Coordinates: 34°36′16″N 98°23′54″W
- Area: 1 acre (0.40 ha)
- Built: 1929
- Architect: Walter T. Vahlberg
- Architectural style: Gothic Revival
- NRHP reference No.: 85000566

The First Christian Church in Lawton, Oklahoma is a historic church at 701 D Avenue. It was built in 1929 and added to the National Register of historic Places in 1985.

It was designed by architect Walter T. Vahlberg in Gothic Revival style. It was built in 1928 but was soon destroyed by a fire, and it was rebuilt in 1929.

According to its National Register nomination, it "is the best example of Gothic Revival style architecture in Southwest Oklahoma" and its stained glass windows are "the most impressive such windows" to be found in any church in that area.
