= Gate School (Gate, Oklahoma) =

- U.S. National Register of Historic Places
- Location within Oklahoma Location within the United States
- Location: Jct. of 4th and Texas, Gate, Oklahoma
- Coordinates: 36°51′18″N 100°3′23″W
- Area: less than one acre
- Built: 1937–38
- Built by: Works Progress Administration
- Architect: Walter T. Vahlberg
- Architectural style: WPA standardized Style
- NRHP reference No.: 99001087
- Added to NRHP: September 10, 1999

The Gate School is the historic former school in Gate, Oklahoma. The yellow brick building was constructed by the Works Progress Administration from 1937 to 1938. The new school building replaced an existing school; due to budgetary constraints, the WPA reused materials from the previous school in the new building. The WPA worked extensively in Beaver County, which includes Gate, due to the Dust Bowl's impact on the local economy, and the new Gate School was one of several WPA-built school buildings in the county. The school served as the local elementary and high school until the high school consolidated with the Laverne school district in 1972; the elementary school followed suit in 1992.

The WPA's standardized plans used for this school were designed by architect Walter T. Vahlberg.

The Gate School was added to the National Register of Historic Places on September 10, 1999. The listing included one contributing building and two contributing structures.
