= Verden, Oklahoma =

- Town
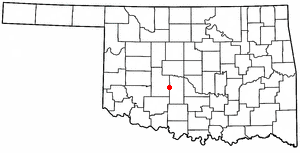
- Location of Verden, Oklahoma
- Coordinates: 35°05′00″N 98°05′10″W
- Country: United States
- State: Oklahoma
- County: Grady

Area
  - Total: 0.39 sq mi (1.01 km^{2})
  - Land: 0.39 sq mi (1.01 km^{2})
  - Water: 0 sq mi (0.00 km^{2})
- Elevation: 1,135 ft (346 m)

Population (2020)
  - Total: 508
  - Density: 1,307.6/sq mi (504.86/km^{2})
- Time zone: UTC-6 (Central (CST))
  - Summer (DST): UTC-5 (CDT)
- ZIP code: 73092
- Area code: 405
- FIPS code: 40-77000
- GNIS feature ID: 2413428

Verden is a town in western Grady County, Oklahoma, United States. It abuts the Caddo County line, and is probably best known as the site of the 1865 Camp Napoleon Council. The population was 580 at the 2020 census, an increase from 530 in 2010.

== History ==
A rural community called "Cottonwood Grove" (Kiowa: Á:kàulèñ) began to emerge near the present site of Verden before the Civil War. It was on the eastern edge of the Kiowa and Comanche reservation that was established by the Medicine Lodge Treaty, that was made with the U.S. government in 1867. A stage stop was established at Cottonwood Grove for travelers en route from Boggy Depot to the Kiowa Agency, Fort Sill, and Fort Cobb. The land around the community, outside the reservation, belonged to the Half Moon Ranch, owned by W. G. "Caddo" Williams. His son-in-law, Charles Campbell, owner of the 7BC Ranch, and E. B. Johnson bought the Half Moon around 1900.

The Chicago, Rock Island and Pacific Railroad (a.k.a. CRI&P or Rock Island Railroad) built tracks through this area, between Chickasha and Mangum in 1900. James N. Jones and his family claimed the land around Cottonwood Grove when the tribes living near the Kiowa Agency were allowed to claim their land allotments. A post office was established at Cottonwood Grove, in 1899, but was discontinued in 1900. Another post office was established in 1902, which was named "Verden", because there was another Cottonwood Grove post office elsewhere in the Oklahoma Territory. The town was platted in 1904, and A. A. Hiatt sold the lots for the CRI&P townsite division. In 1907, Verden became a town incorporated in Oklahoma Territory by the commissioners of Caddo County, and had a population of 312.

Agriculture has been the main economic activity in Verden since its founding, and the railroad made Verden an important shipping point for products of the farms and ranches. The town's public school began in 1905 and absorbed a Caddo County district in 1917. By 1910, the population had climbed to 524 and the town had two banks, a newspaper, the Verden News, a telephone connection, an electric company, a grain elevator, a cotton yard, a cotton gin, a milling company, a lumberyard, and several retail outlets. The business district had survived a major fire in 1908. It also survived several floods that plagued the Washita River valley.

== Geography ==
Verden is located in western Grady County. It is on U.S. Route 62 and State Highway 9, 9 miles (14 km) west of Chickasha, the county seat, and 18 miles (29 km) east of Anadarko.

The town's western border follows the Caddo County line, and the Washita River flows to the east just outside the northern border of the town.

According to the United States Census Bureau, the town has a total area of 0.33 square miles (0.85 km^{2}), all land.

== Demographics ==
Historical population
Census	Pop.	Note	%±
1910	524		—
1920	496		−5.3%
1930	587		18.3%
1940	575		−2.0%
1950	508		−11.7%
1960	405		−20.3%
1970	439		8.4%
1980	625		42.4%
1990	546		−12.6%
2000	659		20.7%
2010	530		−19.6%
2020	508		−4.2%
U.S. Decennial Census

=== 2020 census ===
As of the 2020 census, Verden had a population of 508. The median age was 38.2 years. 27.6% of residents were under the age of 18 and 17.1% of residents were 65 years of age or older. For every 100 females there were 91.7 males, and for every 100 females age 18 and over there were 86.8 males age 18 and over.

0.0% of residents lived in urban areas, while 100.0% lived in rural areas.

There were 196 households in Verden, of which 39.8% had children under the age of 18 living in them. Of all households, 48.5% were married-couple households, 15.3% were households with a male householder and no spouse or partner present, and 30.6% were households with a female householder and no spouse or partner present. About 23.0% of all households were made up of individuals and 11.8% had someone living alone who was 65 years of age or older.

There were 234 housing units, of which 16.2% were vacant. The homeowner vacancy rate was 7.5% and the rental vacancy rate was 3.8%.

Racial composition as of the 2020 census
Race	Number	Percent
White	426	83.9%
Black or African American	1	0.2%
American Indian and Alaska Native	41	8.1%
Asian	0	0.0%
Native Hawaiian and Other Pacific Islander	0	0.0%
Some other race	4	0.8%
Two or more races	36	7.1%
Hispanic or Latino (of any race)	35	6.9%

=== 2000 census ===
As of the census of 2000, there were 659 people, 246 households, and 182 families residing in the town. The population density was 2,047.5 inhabitants per square mile (790.5/km^{2}). There were 280 housing units at an average density of 870.0 per square mile (335.9/km^{2}). The racial makeup of the town was 90.44% White, 6.07% Native American, 0.15% Asian, 0.15% from other races, and 3.19% from two or more races. Hispanic or Latino of any race were 0.61% of the population.

There were 246 households, out of which 38.6% had children under the age of 18 living with them, 59.3% were married couples living together, 9.3% had a female householder with no husband present, and 26.0% were non-families. 24.0% of all households were made up of individuals, and 9.3% had someone living alone who was 65 years of age or older. The average household size was 2.68 and the average family size was 3.14.

In the town, the population was spread out, with 32.0% under the age of 18, 6.4% from 18 to 24, 29.7% from 25 to 44, 19.3% from 45 to 64, and 12.6% who were 65 years of age or older. The median age was 34 years. For every 100 females, there were 83.1 males. For every 100 females age 18 and over, there were 88.2 males.

The median income for a household in the town was $23,667, and the median income for a family was $26,833. Males had a median income of $24,063 versus $20,469 for females. The per capita income for the town was $11,617. About 11.6% of families and 13.4% of the population were below the poverty line, including 11.3% of those under age 18 and 10.3% of those age 65 or over.

== Education ==
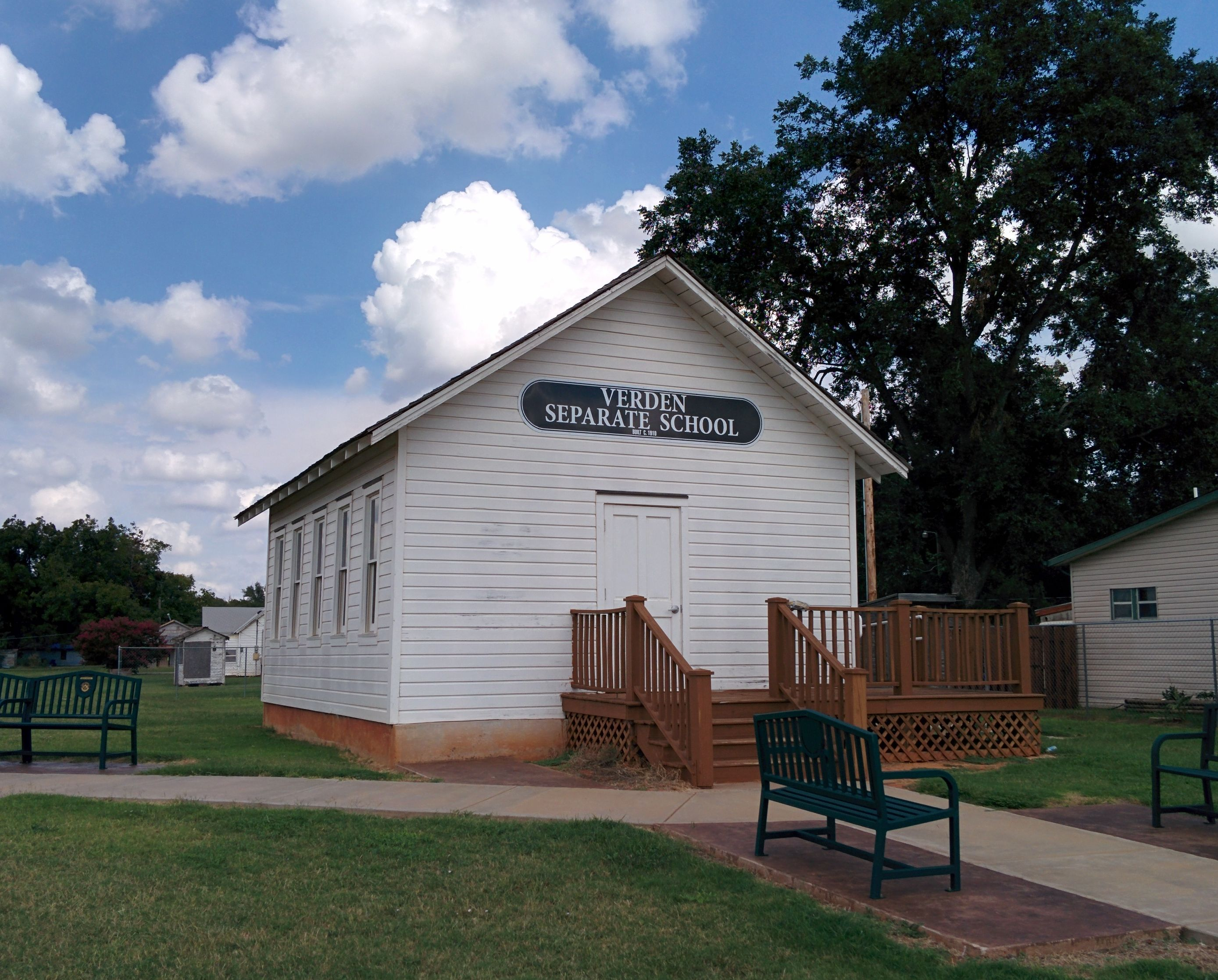
Verden Separate School in 2014 in Chickasha, Oklahoma

Verden resident Allen Toles was an African American farmer who had become a landowner through the Homestead Act of 1862. He built the Verden Separate School on his own property in 1910 as a school for black children. The school operated until 1935. The school building was rediscovered by historians in 2004 and restored and relocated to nearby Chickasha. It was placed on the National Register of Historic Places in 2005.

== Utilities ==
- Telephone, Internet, and Digital TV Services is provided by Hilliary Communications.

== See also ==
- Camp Napoleon Council
