= Amber, Oklahoma =

- Town
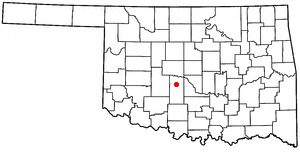
- Location of Amber, Oklahoma
- Coordinates: 35°09′37″N 97°52′55″W
- Country: United States
- State: Oklahoma
- County: Grady

Area
  - Total: 3.95 sq mi (10.23 km^{2})
  - Land: 3.95 sq mi (10.23 km^{2})
  - Water: 0 sq mi (0.00 km^{2})
- Elevation: 1,257 ft (383 m)

Population (2020)
  - Total: 413
  - Density: 104.6/sq mi (40.38/km^{2})
- Time zone: UTC-6 (Central (CST))
  - Summer (DST): UTC-5 (CDT)
- ZIP code: 73004
- Area code: 405
- FIPS code: 40-01900
- GNIS feature ID: 2412360

Amber is a town in Grady County, Oklahoma, United States. Part of the Oklahoma City metropolitan area, it lies along State Highway 92, about 35 miles (56 km) southwest of Oklahoma City and 8 miles (13 km) north of Chickasha, Oklahoma. Established in the early 1900s as a railroad community, Amber was incorporated in 1970 and had a population of 413 at the 2020 census.

== History ==
Amber developed as a rural community in Grady County, Oklahoma, located along the St. Louis–San Francisco Railway about eight miles north of Chickasha, Oklahoma. The completion of the Frisco rail line and the establishment of the Amber post office occurred in 1903. Railroad workers named the town “Amber” after the goldenrod flowers that colored the countryside in autumn.

In 1906, Lena Chastain, a Choctaw landowner, sold the abstract of title for the townsite. W. T. Cloud purchased land east of the rail station, dug the town water well, and opened a store, school, and livery barn. The first school was a subscription school serving children of railroad workers. By 1909, population growth required a five-room school building, which also hosted Baptist, Methodist, and Holiness congregations on alternating Sundays.

Amber School became the first consolidated school in Oklahoma in 1912 when it merged with the Askew and Drennan districts. Enrollment peaked at 499 students during the 1929–30 school year. In 1965, Amber and Pocasset consolidated their schools, bringing nineteen small districts together to form the Amber-Pocasset School District.

Amber's early economy centered on agriculture, with local farmers producing cotton, corn, wheat, oats, and alfalfa. By 1908, the town supported grain elevators, a cotton gin, the Amber Hotel, Amber State Bank, a blacksmith shop, general stores, lumberyards, and a drug store. The community newspaper was the Amber Press.

Amber incorporated as a town in July 1970. Its population grew from 416 in 1980 to 490 in 2000, then declined to 419 in 2010 and 413 in 2020.

== Geography ==
Amber is located in northern Grady County, Oklahoma, approximately 8 miles (13 km) north of Chickasha, Oklahoma and 35 miles (56 km) southwest of Oklahoma City. The town lies along State Highway 92 in a predominantly rural area of central Oklahoma.

According to the United States Census Bureau, Amber has a total area of 3.95 square miles (10.2 km^{2}), all land. The elevation is approximately 1,257 feet (383 m) above sea level.

Amber is part of the Oklahoma City metropolitan area and lies within the Red Bed Plains region of the Great Plains, characterized by gently rolling terrain and mixed-grass prairie.

== Demographics ==
Historical population
Census	Pop.	Note	%±
1980	416		—
1990	418		0.5%
2000	490		17.2%
2010	419		−14.5%
2020	413		−1.4%
U.S. Decennial Census

=== 2020 census ===
As of the 2020 census, Amber had a population of 413. The median age was 33.3 years. 31.2% of residents were under the age of 18 and 12.3% of residents were 65 years of age or older. For every 100 females there were 116.2 males, and for every 100 females age 18 and over there were 111.9 males age 18 and over.

0.0% of residents lived in urban areas, while 100.0% lived in rural areas.

There were 152 households in Amber, of which 40.8% had children under the age of 18 living in them. Of all households, 55.3% were married-couple households, 23.0% were households with a male householder and no spouse or partner present, and 14.5% were households with a female householder and no spouse or partner present. About 16.5% of all households were made up of individuals and 3.9% had someone living alone who was 65 years of age or older.

There were 174 housing units, of which 12.6% were vacant. The homeowner vacancy rate was 1.9% and the rental vacancy rate was 4.0%.

Racial composition as of the 2020 census
Race	Number	Percent
White	345	83.5%
Black or African American	0	0.0%
American Indian and Alaska Native	22	5.3%
Asian	0	0.0%
Native Hawaiian and Other Pacific Islander	0	0.0%
Some other race	0	0.0%
Two or more races	46	11.1%
Hispanic or Latino (of any race)	9	2.2%

=== 2010 census ===
As of the census of 2010, there were 419 people living in the town. The population density was 110 inhabitants per square mile (42/km^{2}). There were 177 housing units at an average density of 45 units per square mile (17 units/km^{2}). The racial makeup of the town was 89.18% White, 0.20% African American, 4.90% Native American, 1.22% Pacific Islander, 0.20% from other races, and 4.29% from two or more races. Hispanic or Latino of any race were 2.04% of the population.

There were 160 households, out of which 47.5% had children under the age of 18 living with them, 74.4% were married couples living together, 7.5% had a female householder with no husband present, and 16.9% were non-families. 15.6% of all households were made up of individuals, and 5.0% had someone living alone who was 65 years of age or older. The average household size was 3.06 and the average family size was 3.34.

In the town, the population was spread out, with 34.9% under the age of 18, 6.9% from 18 to 24, 29.8% from 25 to 44, 20.0% from 45 to 64, and 8.4% who were 65 years of age or older. The median age was 29 years. For every 100 females, there were 96.8 males. For every 100 females age 18 and over, there were 95.7 males.

The median income for a household in the town was $32,083, and the median income for a family was $34,688. Males had a median income of $24,531 versus $20,375 for females. The per capita income for the town was $12,012. About 9.7% of families and 10.8% of the population were below the poverty line, including 9.2% of those under age 18 and 22.2% of those age 65 or over.

== Education ==
It is in the Amber-Pocasset Public Schools school district.
