= Norge, Oklahoma =

- Town
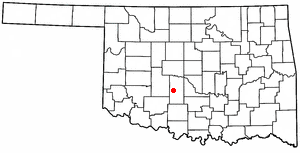
- Location of Norge, Oklahoma
- Coordinates: 34°59′19″N 97°59′39″W
- Country: United States
- State: Oklahoma
- County: Grady

Area
  - Total: 0.32 sq mi (0.83 km^{2})
  - Land: 0.32 sq mi (0.83 km^{2})
  - Water: 0 sq mi (0.00 km^{2})
- Elevation: 1,263 ft (385 m)

Population (2020)
  - Total: 129
  - Density: 400.6/sq mi (154.67/km^{2})
- Time zone: UTC-6 (Central (CST))
  - Summer (DST): UTC-5 (CDT)
- FIPS code: 40-52450
- GNIS feature ID: 2413051

Norge is a town in Grady County, Oklahoma, United States. The population was 129 at the 2020 census, a 11% decrease from 2010.

== Geography ==
Norge is located in western Grady County 7 miles (11 km) southwest of Chickasha, the county seat.

According to the United States Census Bureau, the town has a total area of 0.3 square miles (0.8 km^{2}), all land. The name Norge is the Norwegian word for Norway.

== Demographics ==
Historical population
Census	Pop.	Note	%±
1980	87		—
1990	97		11.5%
2000	82		−15.5%
2010	145		76.8%
2020	129		−11.0%
U.S. Decennial Census

=== 2020 census ===
As of the 2020 census, Norge had a population of 129. The median age was 54.6 years. 20.9% of residents were under the age of 18 and 27.9% of residents were 65 years of age or older. For every 100 females there were 115.0 males, and for every 100 females age 18 and over there were 108.2 males age 18 and over.

0.0% of residents lived in urban areas, while 100.0% lived in rural areas.

There were 52 households in Norge, of which 38.5% had children under the age of 18 living in them. Of all households, 48.1% were married-couple households, 21.2% were households with a male householder and no spouse or partner present, and 23.1% were households with a female householder and no spouse or partner present. About 17.3% of all households were made up of individuals and 5.7% had someone living alone who was 65 years of age or older.

There were 54 housing units, of which 3.7% were vacant. The homeowner vacancy rate was 2.6% and the rental vacancy rate was 0.0%.

Racial composition as of the 2020 census
Race	Number	Percent
White	94	72.9%
Black or African American	0	0.0%
American Indian and Alaska Native	8	6.2%
Asian	0	0.0%
Native Hawaiian and Other Pacific Islander	1	0.8%
Some other race	11	8.5%
Two or more races	15	11.6%
Hispanic or Latino (of any race)	15	11.6%

=== 2000 census ===
As of the census of 2000, there were 82 people, 29 households, and 24 families living in the town. The population density was 826.5 inhabitants per square mile (319.1/km^{2}). There were 33 housing units at an average density of 332.6 per square mile (128.4/km^{2}). The racial makeup of the town was 87.80% White, 6.10% Native American, 3.66% from other races, and 2.44% from two or more races. Hispanic or Latino of any race were 3.66% of the population.

There were 29 households, out of which 44.8% had children under the age of 18 living with them, 69.0% were married couples living together, 13.8% had a female householder with no husband present, and 13.8% were non-families. 13.8% of all households were made up of individuals, and 10.3% had someone living alone who was 65 years of age or older. The average household size was 2.83 and the average family size was 3.08.

In the town, the population was spread out, with 31.7% under the age of 18, 9.8% from 18 to 24, 32.9% from 25 to 44, 13.4% from 45 to 64, and 12.2% who were 65 years of age or older. The median age was 34 years. For every 100 females, there were 95.2 males. For every 100 females age 18 and over, there were 100.0 males.

The median income for a household in the town was $48,750, and the median income for a family was $48,750. Males had a median income of $30,833 versus $24,375 for females. The per capita income for the town was $15,000. There were 7.7% of families and 8.0% of the population living below the poverty line, including 11.1% of under eighteens and none of those over 64.

== Education ==
It is in the Pioneer Public School school district, an elementary school district.
