= Yukon Public Library =

- U.S. National Register of Historic Places
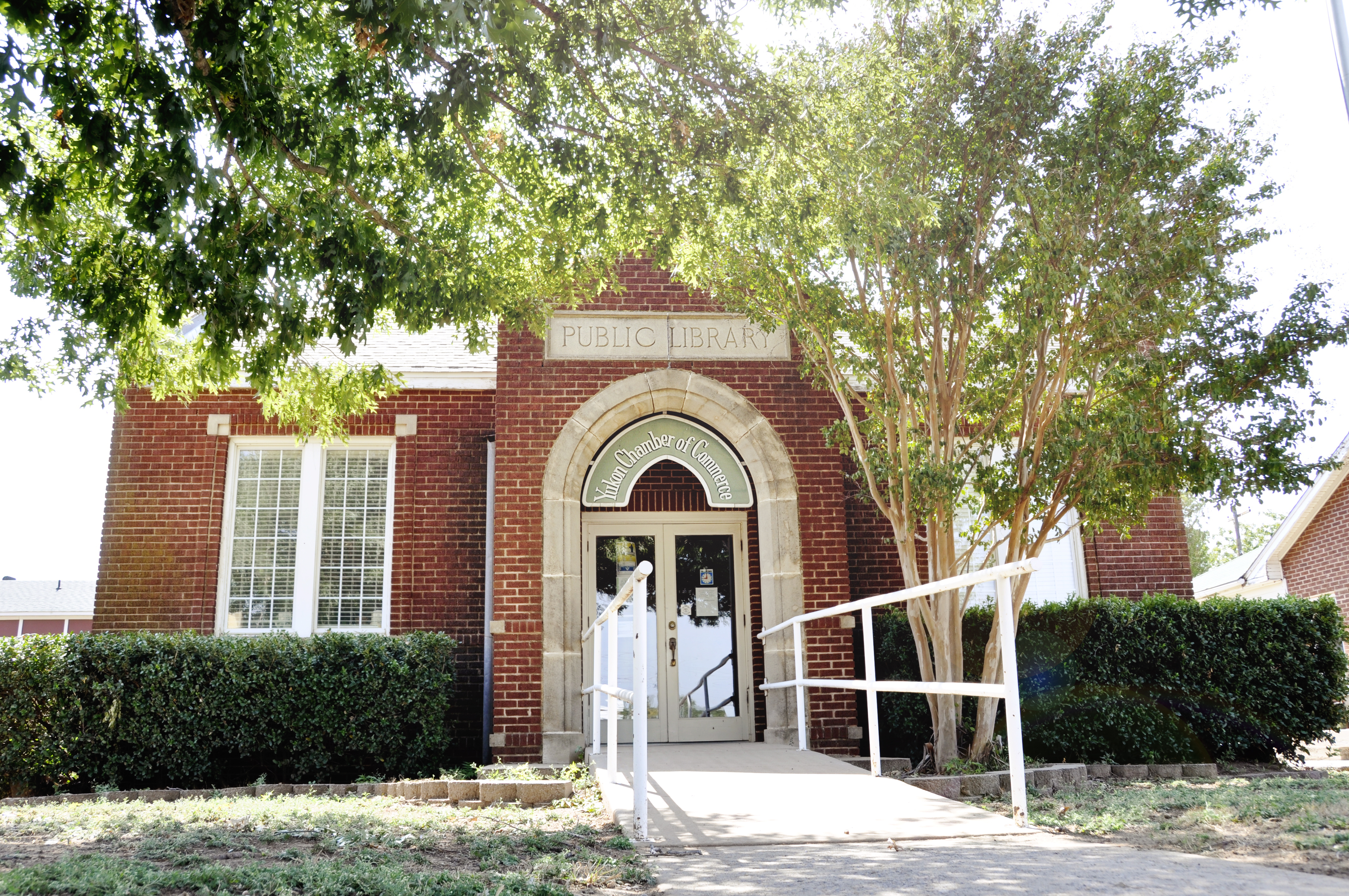

- Location within Oklahoma Location within the United States
- Location: 510 Elm St., Yukon, Oklahoma
- Coordinates: 35°30′24″N 97°45′2″W
- Area: less than one acre
- Built: 1927
- Built by: F. H. Fash
- Architect: Sorey & Vahlberg
- NRHP reference No.: 84002977
- Added to NRHP: February 2, 1984

The Yukon Public Library is a brick-and-mortar Colonial Revival structure located in Yukon, Oklahoma. It was the original public library for the city of Yukon, constructed in 1927 for $4,500 raised by the Yukon Ladies Library Club.

The club continued to financially support and operate the library until 1979, when the city of Yukon assumed responsibility. A new library was constructed and opened in 1980, and the old library building was used as a utility shed and storage. The Friends of the Mabel Fry Library currently occupies the building and hosts their bimonthly book sales there. Today, Yukon's Mabel C. Fry Public Library serves the community of Yukon and Canadian County.

It was designed by architects Sorey & Vahlberg of Oklahoma City.
