= Pocasset Gymnasium =

- U.S. National Register of Historic Places
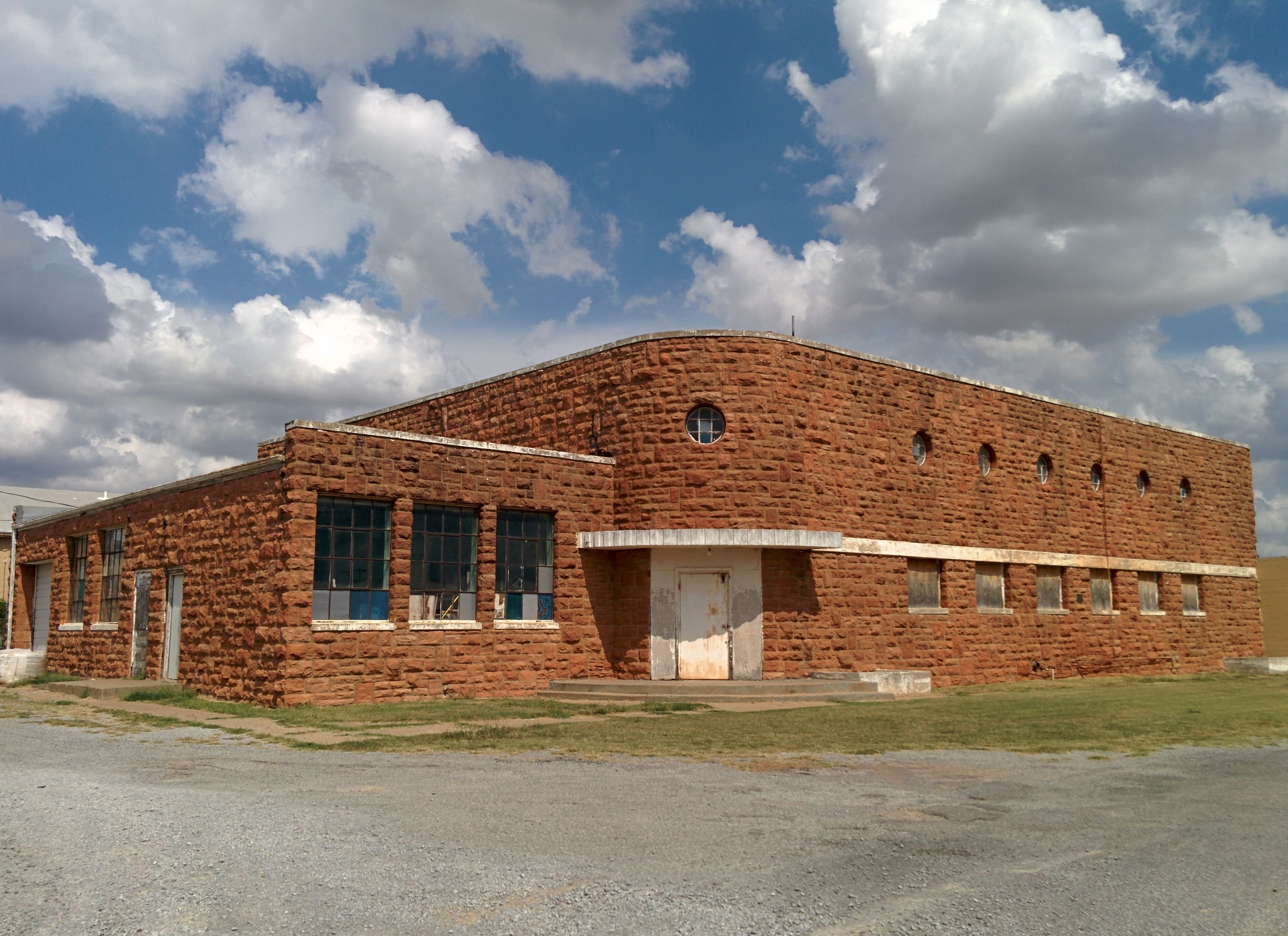

- Location within Oklahoma Location within the United States
- Location: Adams St. & 6th St., Pocasset, Oklahoma
- Coordinates: 35.191969°N 97.955082°W
- Area: less than one acre
- Built: 1940
- Built by: Works Progress Administration
- Architect: Walter T. Vahlberg
- Architectural style: WPA standardized style
- NRHP reference No.: 96001489
- Added to NRHP: December 13, 1996

The Pocasset Gymnasium, in Pocasset, Oklahoma, was built as a Works Progress Administration project in 1940. It was listed on the National Register of Historic Places in 1996.

It is a 110 by 66 feet (34 m × 20 m) building designed by architect Walter T. Vahlberg. It, along with renovations to school buildings in Pocasset, was to be funded by a WPA grant of 17,720 dollars and Pocasset School Board funds of 10,990 dollars, under a voter-approved bond.

It is located at the intersection of Adams St. and 6th St. in Pocasset. This is about .125 miles (0.201 km) to the west off of Main St. (U.S. Highway 81), about .5 miles (0.80 km) south of the junction of U.S. 81 with Dutton Rd.
