= Acme, Oklahoma =

- Unincorporated community
- Location within Oklahoma Location within the United States
- Coordinates: 34°47′56″N 98°01′09″W
- Country: United States
- State: Oklahoma
- County: Grady
- Time zone: UTC-6 (Central (CST))
  - Summer (DST): UTC-5 (CDT)
- GNIS feature ID: 1100162

Acme is a ghost town in Grady County, Oklahoma, United States. It had a post office from April 8, 1913, to May 29, 1931.

The former community was 3 miles (4.8 km) west of the present community of Rush Springs.

== History ==
The town of Acme developed when the Acme Cement and Plaster Company built a mill and power plant in the area in 1911. Gypsum was mined from the area. The Chicago, Rock Island and Pacific Railroad built a spur to serve the plant. At its peak production, the plant employed 100 to 125 workers to produce six to eight railcar loads of product every day. When the nearby gypsum beds were exhausted, the company built a narrow-gauge railroad between the Acme plant and some other beds near the Little Washita River. A flood covered these additional beds with several feet of sand in 1927. Work continued on these beds, but this proved unprofitable. After 1930, the entire venture became unprofitable and the company closed everything. The railroad was abandoned in 1930.

Very little is left of the former town, except for a few houses and some concrete ruins of the mill. The mill machinery was all moved away. Most of the former supporting structures, such as the school, boarding houses and general store were later torn down.

== Geography ==
Elevation is 1,286 feet/392 m.

== See also ==
- List of ghost towns in Oklahoma
