= Verden Separate School =

- U.S. National Register of Historic Places
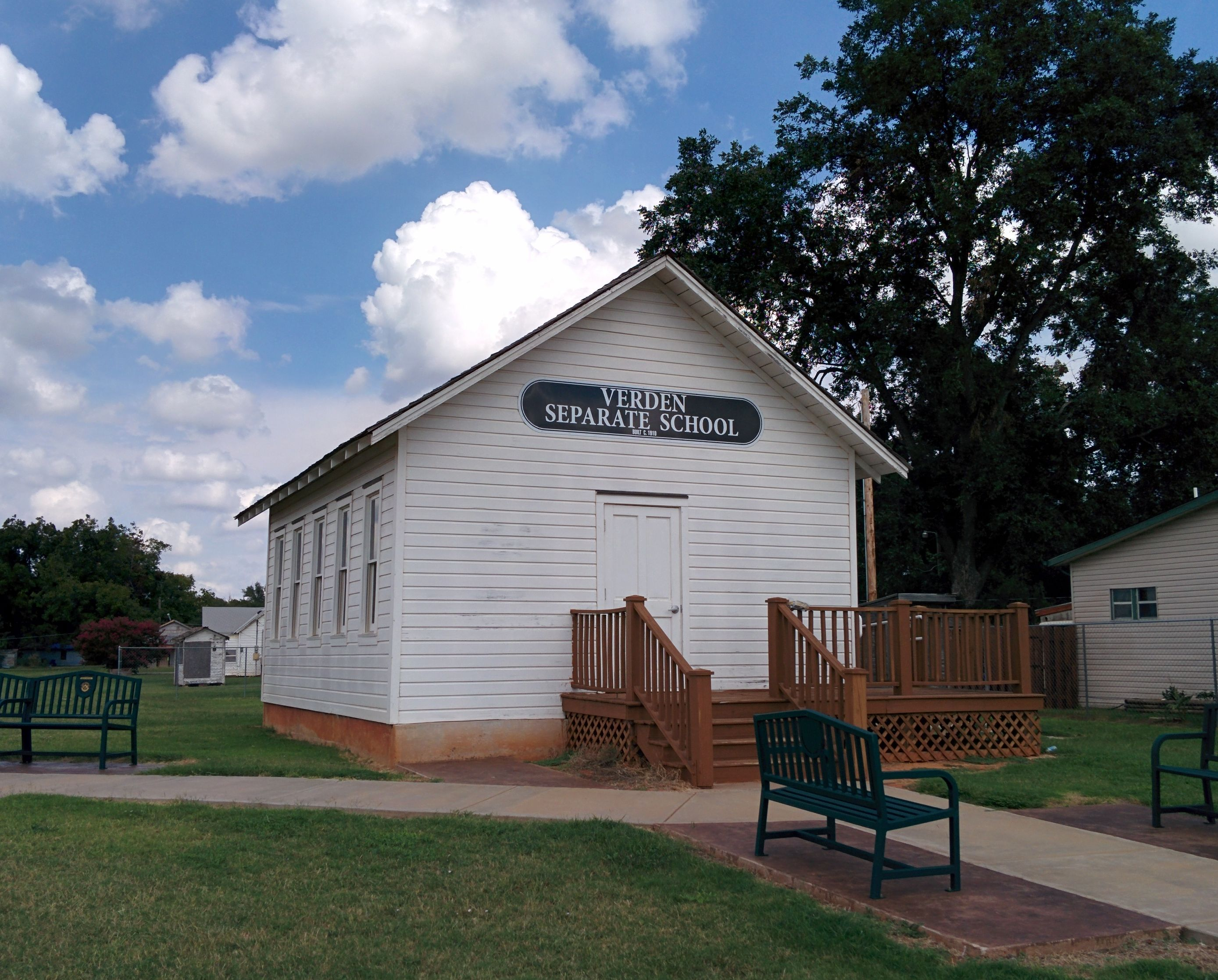

- Location within Oklahoma Location within the United States
- Location: 315 E. Ada Sipuel Ave., Chickasha, Oklahoma
- Coordinates: 35°2′39″N 97°55′43″W
- Area: less than one acre
- NRHP reference No.: 05001416
- Added to NRHP: December 16, 2005

The Verden Separate School is a historic school building at 315 East Ada Sipuel Avenue in Chickasha, Oklahoma. A modest wood-frame gable-roofed one-room district schoolhouse that now serves as a local museum, it was built about 1915 on a farm on the outskirts of Verden. It served as a school for Verden's African American students under the separate but equal doctrine, which in Oklahoma resulted in the mandated creation of "separate schools" for whichever racial group was in the minority in a given district or region. It was used as a school until 1935, when its student population was consolidated into the Chickasha schools. It was then used as a farm outbuilding until the early 2000s, when it was rescued from demolition, moved to its present location, and restored. It is the only known surviving separate school in Grady County, and one of a few left in southwestern Oklahoma.

The building was listed on the National Register of Historic Places in 2005.

== See also ==
- National Register of Historic Places listings in Grady County, Oklahoma
