= Antioch, Arkansas =

- Unincorporated community
- Location within Arkansas
- Coordinates: 35°55′46″N 90°34′37″W
- Country: United States
- State: Arkansas
- County: Craighead
- Elevation: 312 ft (95 m)
- Time zone: UTC-6 (Central (CST))
  - Summer (DST): UTC-5 (CDT)
- GNIS feature ID: 57273

Antioch is an unincorporated community in Craighead County, Arkansas, United States.
