= Amber-Pocasset Independent School District =

School district in Oklahoma

Location
- Amber, Oklahoma, Oklahoma United States

District information
- Type: Public

The Amber-Pocasset Independent School District is a school district based in Amber, Oklahoma, United States. It contains an elementary school and a combined middle/high school.

== See also ==
List of school districts in Oklahoma
