= Pocasset, Oklahoma =

- Town
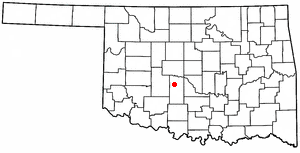
- Location of Pocasset, Oklahoma
- Coordinates: 35°10′41″N 97°57′33″W
- Country: United States
- State: Oklahoma
- County: Grady

Area
  - Total: 2.71 sq mi (7.03 km^{2})
  - Land: 2.71 sq mi (7.03 km^{2})
  - Water: 0 sq mi (0.00 km^{2})
- Elevation: 1,178 ft (359 m)

Population (2020)
  - Total: 183
  - Density: 67.4/sq mi (26.04/km^{2})
- Time zone: UTC-6 (Central (CST))
  - Summer (DST): UTC-5 (CDT)
- ZIP code: 73079
- Area code: 405
- FIPS code: 40-59700
- GNIS feature ID: 2412493

Pocasset is a town in Grady County, Oklahoma, United States. The population was 183 at the 2020 census, a 17.3% increase from 2010.

== Geography ==
Pocasset is located in northwestern Grady County. U.S. Route 81 passes through the town center, leading south 11 miles (18 km) to Chickasha, the county seat, and north 8 miles (13 km) to Minco.

According to the United States Census Bureau, Pocasset has a total area of 0.46 square miles (1.2 km^{2}), all land.

== Demographics ==
Historical population
Census	Pop.	Note	%±
2000	192		—
2010	156		−18.7%
2020	183		17.3%
U.S. Decennial Census

=== 2020 census ===
As of the 2020 census, Pocasset had a population of 183. The median age was 45.3 years. 20.2% of residents were under the age of 18 and 20.8% of residents were 65 years of age or older. For every 100 females there were 84.8 males, and for every 100 females age 18 and over there were 84.8 males age 18 and over.

0.0% of residents lived in urban areas, while 100.0% lived in rural areas.

There were 80 households in Pocasset, of which 31.3% had children under the age of 18 living in them. Of all households, 47.5% were married-couple households, 17.5% were households with a male householder and no spouse or partner present, and 31.3% were households with a female householder and no spouse or partner present. About 31.3% of all households were made up of individuals and 17.5% had someone living alone who was 65 years of age or older.

There were 99 housing units, of which 19.2% were vacant. The homeowner vacancy rate was 2.7% and the rental vacancy rate was 9.1%.

Racial composition as of the 2020 census
Race	Number	Percent
White	160	87.4%
Black or African American	2	1.1%
American Indian and Alaska Native	3	1.6%
Asian	0	0.0%
Native Hawaiian and Other Pacific Islander	0	0.0%
Some other race	4	2.2%
Two or more races	14	7.7%
Hispanic or Latino (of any race)	3	1.6%

=== 2000 census ===
As of the census of 2000, there were 192 people, 75 households, and 54 families living in the town. The population density was 402.5 inhabitants per square mile (155.4/km^{2}). There were 93 housing units at an average density of 195.0 per square mile (75.3/km^{2}). The racial makeup of the town was 91.67% White, 2.60% Native American, 2.60% from other races, and 3.12% from two or more races. Hispanic or Latino of any race were 6.77% of the population.

There were 75 households, out of which 36.0% had children under the age of 18 living with them, 60.0% were married couples living together, 8.0% had a female householder with no husband present, and 28.0% were non-families. 26.7% of all households were made up of individuals, and 5.3% had someone living alone who was 65 years of age or older. The average household size was 2.56 and the average family size was 3.09.

In the town, the population was spread out, with 30.7% under the age of 18, 9.4% from 18 to 24, 29.7% from 25 to 44, 16.7% from 45 to 64, and 13.5% who were 65 years of age or older. The median age was 33 years. For every 100 females, there were 90.1 males. For every 100 females age 18 and over, there were 95.6 males.

The median income for a household in the town was $25,417, and the median income for a family was $30,250. Males had a median income of $26,250 versus $15,000 for females. The per capita income for the town was $10,751. About 11.1% of families and 16.0% of the population were below the poverty line, including 22.4% of those under the age of eighteen and 8.3% of those 65 or over.

== Education ==
It is in the Amber-Pocasset Public Schools school district.
