= Phillip Dean Hancock =

American convicted killer executed in Oklahoma

Phillip Hancock
- 2011 mugshot
- Born: February 15, 1964; Oklahoma, U.S.
- Died: November 30, 2023 (aged 59); Oklahoma State Penitentiary, Oklahoma, U.S.
- Status: Executed by lethal injection
- Motive: Drug-related disputes
- Convictions: First degree murder (2 counts); First degree manslaughter (1 count); Using an offensive weapon during a felony (1 count); Possession of a firearm by a convicted felon (2 counts); Possession of a controlled dangerous substance with intent to distribute (2 counts); Possession of a precursor substance (1 count); Carrying weapons, drugs, or alcohol into jail (1 count)
- Penalty: Death

Details
- Victims: Charles Lester Warren, 27; Robert Lee Jett Jr., 38; James Vincent Lynch III, 58
- Span of crimes: 1982–2001
- Country: United States
- State: Oklahoma
- Location: Oklahoma City
- Imprisoned at: Oklahoma State Penitentiary

Phillip Dean Hancock (February 15, 1964 – November 30, 2023) was an American convicted serial killer who killed a total of three people between 1982 and 2001. In 1982, Hancock was charged with fatally shooting a drug trafficker, Charles Lester Warren, which he claimed was done in self-defense. He received a four-year sentence for first degree manslaughter. Nineteen years later, Hancock would commit the double murder of James Vincent Lynch III and Robert Lee Jett Jr., shooting both of them to death in 2001. He again claimed that both killings were done in self-defense. This time, however, Hancock was found guilty of two counts of first degree murder and sentenced to death. Hancock, who stood by his claims of self-defense throughout the post-conviction appeal process, was eventually executed via lethal injection on November 30, 2023.

== Background ==
Phillip Dean Hancock, the elder of two sons, was born on February 15, 1964, and grew up in Oklahoma City. His younger brother was diagnosed with cerebral palsy after he was born with the umbilical cord binding his neck, and Hancock took care of his brother during their formative years, and even fought with older boys to defend him from bullying.

As a child, Hancock would go to a Methodist church with his parents, but he would often go to nearby car salvage lots to smoke marijuana and cigarettes with other children. Hancock's father was reportedly abusive towards his children and wife, who had to run away from home at one point to escape the domestic violence.

== Murder of Charles Warren (1982) ==
On May 26, 1982, at the age of 18, Hancock killed his first victim, 27-year-old Charles Lester Warren, in a park in Oklahoma City.

According to media sources and court documents, Hancock and his accomplice, 16-year-old Kenneth Ray Hulsey, were involved in a shooting incident that left one man dead and two bystanders injured. The deceased victim, Warren, was said to be a drug dealer who sold drugs to adolescent people in the park, and based on court testimonies, Warren and Hancock got into verbal altercations with each other due to a ring that had gone missing from Warren's house. According to 16-year-old Patrick Michael O'Brien, who was there at the scene of the crime, he saw Hancock being beaten by Warren inside the park, and Hancock allegedly said he wanted to shoot Warren. O'Brien tried to dissuade him from doing this considering the crowd in the park and the stupidity of such an intention.

According to Hancock, Warren threatened to harm him, and Warren's menacing physique made Hancock more fearful for his life. Hancock, who was being slapped by Warren a few times at the park on the day in question, admitted to the authorities that he said he wanted to "blow [Warren's] head off" after the slapping, only because he felt upset. After Warren allegedly threatened Hancock that he would force him out of his car and beat him up, Hancock took Hulsey's .22-caliber rifle and fired several shots at Warren, who sustained five gunshot wounds and died. During the shooting, 18-year-old Karen Barber and 19-year-old William J. Orr were both injured by Hancock.

A day after the shootings, Hancock surrendered himself and he was charged with one count of first-degree murder and two counts of shooting with intent to kill on May 28, two days after the shooting. Jury selection commenced in October 1982, who was set to stand trial that same month.*

For the charge of first degree murder, Hancock stood trial before a 12-member jury for four days before the trial ended with a verdict of first degree manslaughter after his claims of self-defense were accepted by the jury. On October 21, 1982, the same day of the jury's ruling, Hancock was handed the minimum sentence of four years' imprisonment for the offense. Hancock would serve less than three years in prison before his release on parole. Due to his age, Hulsey was not tried for the killing of Warren.

== Murders of Robert Jett Jr. and James Lynch (2001) ==
On April 27, 2001, 19 years after his first killing, Phillip Hancock once again committed murder, but this time, he shot two men aged 38 and 58 respectively in Oklahoma City.

On that night itself, Hancock went to the house of one of the victims, 38-year-old Robert Lee Jett Jr., who had often supplied drugs to Hancock's then-girlfriend. Jett was together with Hancock and two more people in his house – Jett's 58-year-old friend James Vincent Lynch III and a woman named Shawn "Smokey" Tarp – at the time of the shooting. Hancock reportedly quarreled with Jett and Lynch over a pack of cigarettes after the men ingested some drugs. It was allegedly during the quarrel that Jett had whipped out his pistol and Hancock disarmed Jett during a physical altercation, and Hancock shot both Jett and Lynch to death. According to Tarp, who was not hurt in the shootings (since she sought refuge in a bedroom), she witnessed Jett, who was injured, being chased down the backyard by Hancock, and when Jett fell onto the ground and said he was "going to die," Hancock coldly replied that Jett would die and finished him off. The police were alerted by one of Jett's neighbors who heard the gunshots, and the murders thus came into revelation.

However, Hancock was not immediately caught for the double murder despite the police's efforts to identify him and a police sketch of his face (which was partly due to Tarp not knowing Hancock's name). In fact, he spent a year evading justice after he murdered Lynch and Jett before he was arrested and later convicted on March 26, 2002, for firearm and drug-related offenses, and incarcerated in the Great Plains Correctional Institution in Hinton. Shortly after he was sent to prison, Hancock's involvement in the murders was revealed after forensic evidence connected him to the slayings, and hence, Hancock was charged with two counts of first-degree murder on June 28, 2002.

Although Hancock argued in court that he shot the two victims in self-defense by claiming that the victims were gang members who wanted to harm him, an Oklahoma County jury found him guilty of murdering both Lynch and Jett and recommended the death penalty for each count of murder on September 30, 2004. The trial judge Susan P. Caswell formally sentenced Hancock to death for the double murder on October 25, 2004.

== Death row and execution ==
After the end of his trial, Hancock spent the next 19 years of his life on Oklahoma's death row.

Hancock's appeal was dismissed in 2007 by the Oklahoma Court of Criminal Appeals. Hancock lost his final appeal to the U.S. Supreme Court in 2016, making him one of Oklahoma's 11 death row inmates eligible for execution, and the number increased to 16 as of March 2018. By February 2020, the number of inmates eligible for execution after exhausting all available appeals had risen to 26 (Hancock was one of them).

Hancock and 27 other death row inmates filed lawsuit against the state over Oklahoma's execution protocol, and the lawsuit was dismissed in June 2022 after the courts ruled that there was no breach of constitutionality in the death penalty laws of Oklahoma. Hancock also appealed for new post-conviction DNA testing to back his claims of self-defense in July 2022.

In August 2022, Hancock's death warrant was issued, scheduling his tentative execution date as May 4, 2023. In January 2023, following a court order from the Oklahoma Court of Criminal Appeals, Hancock's execution was rescheduled to take place on November 30, 2023. Six other condemned prisoners – Jemaine Cannon, Anthony Castillo Sanchez, James Ryder, Michael Dewayne Smith, Wade Lay and Richard Glossip – also had their execution dates rescheduled between 2023 and 2024.

In October 2023, a month before Hancock was slated to be put to death, a clemency hearing was scheduled for Hancock on November 8, 2023. Hancock and his lawyers implored the five-member panel of the Oklahoma Pardon and Parole Board to grant clemency to Hancock and commute his death sentence to life imprisonment without the possibility of parole, arguing that Hancock killed both Lynch and Jett out of self-defense and also asked for DNA testing to prove that Hancock acted in self-defense and stated that mercy should be given to Hancock, who was acting to protect himself for fear of his own life and safety.

Assistant Attorney General Joshua Lockett rebutted the defense's arguments, stating that the self-defense claims did not tally with the objective evidence found at the crime scene and Hancock himself gave inconsistent accounts of what happened. Lockett said that Hancock's self-defense claims were thoroughly scrutinized by the jury before reaching the verdict of death in his case, and these arguments were also duly considered in multiple appeals before the death sentences were upheld. He stated that Hancock's acts of chasing the injured victims, telling them to die, and shooting them to death were not clear instances of self-defense. The families of both Jett and Lynch objected to clemency in the case of Hancock. Jett's brother, Ryan, conceded that his brother was not an angel by any means but rebutted that he did not "deserve to die in the backyard like a dog".

On November 8, 2023, by a vote of three to two, the parole board recommended that Hancock should be granted clemency and agreed that his death sentence should be commuted to life in prison without the possibility of parole. Hancock's lawyers were gratified at the decision and they hoped that it would be approved by the governor of Oklahoma. However, James Lynch's brother Robert Lynch was disappointed with the decision and wanted Hancock's death sentence to be carried out as originally decided, and Lockett was similarly disappointed with the decision and he admonished Hancock for his lack of remorse and unwillingness to submit to his fate or seek forgiveness for his actions. The final decision laid at the hands of the Oklahoma state governor Kevin Stitt, who had the discretion to either grant or refuse clemency for Hancock.

Prior to the death warrant of Hancock, Governor Stitt had granted clemency only once, to former death row inmate Julius Jones, whose death sentence for murdering a businessman in 1999 was commuted to life without parole merely hours before he was scheduled to be executed in 2021. Governor Stitt also rejected the parole board's recommendations for clemency in the two cases of Bigler Stouffer and James Allen Coddington, both of whom were, in the end, executed for murder.

On November 30, 2023, the same date of Hancock's impending execution, Governor Stitt announced his decision to reject Hancock's clemency plea and ordered that the execution should move forward. Merely three hours after Governor Stitt refused to grant clemency, 59-year-old Phillip Dean Hancock was officially put to death via lethal injection at the Oklahoma State Penitentiary.

Before he was administered with a three-drug lethal injection, Hancock used his last words to express his gratitude to his lawyers and continued to insist till the end that the double murder was an act of self-defense, and expressed his wish to be exonerated after his death. Hancock also harshly criticized the prosecution under the office of Attorney General Gentner Drummond, and in his words, Hancock quoted:

"They’re vile. They’re virtueless. They’re without honor."

For his last meal, Hancock ordered a bucket of fried chicken—dark meat with no sides—from KFC and root beer.

== Aftermath ==
Phillip Dean Hancock was the fourth and final condemned inmate to be executed in Oklahoma after Scott James Eizember (January), Jemaine Cannon (July) and Anthony Castillo Sanchez (September). Overall, Hancock was the last convict to be executed in the U.S. during the year of 2023, which oversaw a total of 24 executions, a sharp rise from 18 executions in the previous year of 2022.

The execution of Hancock was greatly criticized by death penalty opponents. One focal point of criticism was that the Oklahoma state governor Kevin Stitt waited until the last minute before he announced his decision to not commute Hancock's death sentence and allowed the execution to move forward. Don Heath, a member of the Oklahoma Coalition to Abolish the Death Penalty, stated that he could not imagine the anxiety felt by Hancock to await the decision of Governor Stitt throughout the final weeks of his life after the parole board gave their decision. In response to the criticism, Governor Stitt released a media statement and expressed that he had duly considered the matter and relevant factors like Hancock's previous self-defense claims in the 1982 killing of Charles Warren. He stated that it was one of the "painfully difficult" decisions he was constrained to make in light of the situation and he did not take it lightly.

One of Hancock's lawyers Shawn Nolan released a media statement after the execution, stating that the team of lawyers in Hancock's case were "profoundly sad" that Hancock was executed in spite of the parole board's recommendation to grant clemency and maintained that his case was a clear case of self-defense. On the other hand, the families of James Lynch and Robert Jett Jr. welcomed the execution of Hancock. On behalf of the families, Jett's brother Ryan told the press that justice was finally served 22 years after the double murder.

Devon Moss, an atheist chaplain who interacted with Hancock for more than a year accepted an interview in January 2024, two months after Hancock was executed. The chaplain spoke about his experiences of conversing with Hancock on Atheism and what awaits an Atheist who did not believe in God after death, and how Hancock gradually chose to be Atheist over the years on death row. Moss was together with Hancock in the execution chamber throughout the execution process, until Hancock was pronounced dead at 11:29 a.m.

== See also ==
- Capital punishment in Oklahoma
- List of people executed in Oklahoma
- List of people executed in the United States in 2023
- List of serial killers in the United States

Executions carried out in Oklahoma
Preceded by Anthony Castillo Sanchez September 21, 2023	Phillip Dean Hancock; November 30, 2023	Succeeded by Michael Dewayne Smith April 4, 2024
Executions carried out in the United States
Preceded by David Santiago Renteria – Texas November 16, 2023	Phillip Dean Hancock – Oklahoma; November 30, 2023	Succeeded by Kenneth Eugene Smith – Alabama January 25, 2024
