= Murder of Juli Busken =

1996 murder and rape of a University of Oklahoma dance student

Juli Busken
- Photo of Juli Busken
- Born: Jewell Jean Busken; October 24, 1975; Benton, Arkansas, U.S.
- Died: December 20, 1996 (aged 21); Norman, Oklahoma, U.S.
- Cause of death: Fatal gunshot wound to the head
- Resting place: Memorial Park Cemetery
- Other name: Juli Busken
- Education: University of Oklahoma (incomplete)
- Known for: Rape and murder victim
- Parents: Bud Busken (father); Mary Jean Busken (mother)

On December 20, 1996, in Oklahoma, 21-year-old Juli Busken, a University of Oklahoma dance student and resident of Benton, Arkansas, was abducted from her apartment's parking lot and subsequently raped and murdered. The case remained unsolved for years before the killer was caught while he was in jail for burglary.

The murderer, Anthony Sanchez (November 1, 1978 – September 21, 2023), whose DNA profile matched that of the sperm on Busken's clothing, was convicted of the murder and sentenced to death in 2006. Sanchez, however, protested his innocence and claimed that his father was the real killer. Sanchez was eventually executed on September 21, 2023.

== Murder ==
On December 20, 1996, 21-year-old dance student Jewell Jean "Juli" Busken was found murdered near the shoreline of Lake Stanley Draper after she disappeared from the parking lot of her apartment in Norman, Oklahoma.

Prior to her disappearance, Busken, who had completed her final semester in the University of Oklahoma and was set to graduate on a later date, planned to return to her parents' home in Arkansas and enroll in the master's teaching program at the University of Arkansas, and her parents were scheduled to arrive on the day of her disappearance to fetch her back home. Busken gathered with her college friends on the evening of December 19, 1996, and exchanged Christmas gifts and goodbyes. Busken spent the night with a friend named Megan Schreck at the latter's apartment in West Lindsey Street. After bringing Schreck to the Will Rogers Airport on the morning of December 20, 1996, Busken returned to her own apartment and it was the last time she was seen alive.

At around 5.30am, at the apartment of Busken, at least three witnesses heard a woman scream in terror. One of them was a police officer named William Alves, who was an off-duty security officer of the apartments. Alves heard the scream but did not witness anything suspicious. A neighbour, Jackie Evans, who lived across the parking lot from Busken's residence, testified that right after the woman's scream, she also heard a man saying "Just shut up and get in the car." A police report was filed thereafter, and police officer Kyle Harris responded to the scene, but she found nothing suspicious.

Ryan James, a close friend of Juli Busken who worked together at the OU Golf Course, had planned to meet for lunch on December 20, 1996. James, who arrived at her apartment around 11am, noticed that Busken's car was missing. After he went to work and returned to Busken's apartment at 4pm, James found out that she never returned. Out of concern, James contacted his grandparents to inquire them about the whereabouts of Busken, who often visited them, but she had not been there either. James, joined by his grandfather, searched for her everywhere, and even drove to the airport, but they failed to locate Busken. Together, the men contacted OU Police Chief Joe Lester and filed a missing persons report, prompting a search for her.

Simultaneously, on that same day at noon, a fisherman named Randy Lankford noticed something strange along the shoreline of Lake Stanley Draper. Lankford left the scene before he returned with his wife after nightfall to check the mysterious object, and it turned out to be the body of a woman. The couple reported the gruesome discovery to the police, who later identified the body as Juli Busken, based on her description in a missing persons report.

An autopsy report showed that Busken sustained a single gunshot wound to her head. The wound, which was located at the rear side of Busken's skull and penetrated the brain before ending at the skull's frontal side, was determined to be the cause of death. There was forensic evidence to prove that Busken was raped and sodomized before her death, based on the traces of human spermatozoa found on her vaginal area and bruises found on her face and lower part of the body.

== Police investigations ==
=== Charge sheet and possible suspects ===
After the revelation of the crime, the police investigated the case of Juli Busken's murder, which remained unsolved for the next eight years. In March 2000, four years after Busken was murdered, the prosecution, led by Cleveland County District Attorney Tim Kuykendall, formally charged the unidentified killer, known as "John Doe" in the charge sheet, with murder, rape, forcible sodomy and kidnapping, and used the unknown perpetrator's DNA profile to form a description of him. The prosecution also retained the right to amend the charge sheet to include the killer's identity once there was a match in the DNA database. Although there was a seven-year statute of limitations for sexual offences, the charge sheet against Busken's rapist-killer would still be effective and he could still be prosecuted for the rape and sodomy charges listed in the charge sheet even after the limitations, in Busken's case, expired in 2003 (provided he was still not caught at that point).

The police managed to extract DNA samples from the discarded underwear and leotard last worn by Busken before her death, as well as the vaginal and anal swabs done on her corpse. Several suspects were summoned for investigations and had their DNA tested in order to identify the killer(s) responsible for the rape-murder of Busken. The police also released a composite sketch of the suspected killer, described to be White and around 23 years old, with a height ranging from 178 to 183 cm, weighed 160 to 175 pounds with light brown, collar-length hair and a medium complexion.

In February 1997, a homeless man named Isaac "Ike" Gibson was classified as a suspect after he was found to resemble the prime suspect. Gibson, who was in prison for public intoxication, was later cleared of all suspicion after he was ruled out as the killer through thorough investigations.

In March 1998, Gregory Michael Taylor, a 26-year-old man who was charged with driving under the influence and jumping bail was arrested for these charges and, in turn, he was listed as a suspect behind Busken's murder after an anonymous tip-off revealed that Taylor fitted the description of the suspected murderer. Taylor was found innocent after the DNA test results showed that his DNA profile did not match the suspect's.

In August 2000, twin brothers Dennis and Travis Stuermer, and their father Pete were summoned by the police to submit DNA evidence; the twins were then facing charges for unrelated minor offences. The Stuermers were all later found innocent after their DNA profiles did not match to the DNA profile of the killer(s).

In February 2002, 24-year-old Kevin Lee Cassil, who was charged with the first-degree rape of a 17-year-old girl and two attempted abductions of women, was also investigated as a suspect behind the murder of Busken and the 2003 disappearance of a Japanese college student. After the DNA tests showed that Cassil's DNA did not match to that of the murderer, Cassil was ruled out as a suspect.

In February 2004, 31-year-old Mark Christian Every, who was in a California prison for sexual assault charges, was investigated as a suspect behind the murder of Busken after the police found out that Every lived near the crime scene where the murder happened, and that Every moved out of Oklahoma and relocated to California soon after the killing. Two months later, DNA tests confirmed that Every was not involved in the murder due to the DNA profile not matched to the suspect.

=== Breakthrough and arrest of Anthony Sanchez ===
In July 2004, it was announced to the public that the Oklahoma City police force identified the alleged murderer of the Juli Busken case, after the DNA profile of a 25-year-old convicted burglar detained in an Oklahoma prison matched to the DNA profile of the perpetrator. The inmate had earlier submitted a DNA sample on April 7, 2003, for the police to test the DNA samples of convicted criminals and find a match to the culprit of Busken's rape-murder.

The inmate, Anthony Castillo Sanchez, who was 18 when he allegedly raped and murdered Busken, was formally charged on September 22, 2004, with murder, rape, forcible sodomy and kidnapping, in accordance to the March 2000 charge sheet earlier filed against him (after the prosecution amended the charge sheet and included his identity). The prosecution expressed their intent to seek the death penalty for Sanchez.

Background information showed that Sanchez had previous convictions in Oklahoma County for escaping from a halfway house and in Cleveland County for hiding stolen property, pointing a firearm, and second-degree burglary. It was further reported that Sanchez was a suspect behind the 1995 murder of J. Gary Braman. Although Sanchez was wanted for this crime at that time, Sanchez's cousin Jackie Bruce Jr. was convicted of first-degree murder and sentenced to life without parole for the slaying of Braman, and Bruce claimed that Sanchez was not involved in the crime. Sanchez was also charged with the 2001 rape of his former girlfriend, who bore a child for him in the past, because he allegedly forced her to undress and forcibly had sex with her. However, through a plea agreement, Sanchez was not convicted of the rape and instead, sentenced to ten years' jail with a suspended eight-year sentence for second-degree burglary.

== Trial of Anthony Sanchez ==
Anthony Castillo Sanchez
- Sanchez's 2019 mugshot
- Born: November 1, 1978; Oklahoma, U.S.
- Died: September 21, 2023 (aged 44); Oklahoma State Penitentiary, Oklahoma, U.S.
- Cause of death: Execution by lethal injection
- Convictions: First-degree murder Rape; Sodomy
- Penalty: 40 years' imprisonment (rape); 20 years' imprisonment (sodomy); Death (murder)

Details
- Victims: Juli Busken, 21 (murdered)
- Date: December 20, 1996
- Location: Norman, Oklahoma
- Imprisoned at: Oklahoma State Penitentiary

After his indictment, Anthony Sanchez was scheduled to stand trial before a Cleveland County jury in January 2006 for the sodomy, rape and murder of Juli Busken. Before the start of his trial however, Sanchez's defence counsel sought to declare the blood tests and mouth swabs done on Sanchez after his arrest as illegal, because, in their submissions, they stated that Sanchez's right to privacy was violated due to the blood samples being taken from him after his arrest, and sent for DNA testing with respect to Busken's rape-murder when he was not a suspect at that time. However, the defence's request was overruled by the judge, who ordered that the DNA evidence could be used against Sanchez.

On January 30, 2006, the jury selection phase of Sanchez's trial commenced.

During the trial itself, the prosecution argued that Sanchez was responsible for abducting Busken and forced her into her own car, before he raped, sodomized and finally shot her to death. One of the witnesses, Janice Kay Merryman, testified that she saw Busken and her abductor minutes before the possible time frame of her death. She said that she saw a fearful-looking female passenger resembling Busken inside a small red car with Arkansas registration numbers (which was Busken's car) with a male driver with angry and cold-looking eyes. Another witness, David Kill, testified that he also saw Busken's car, driven by a male driver but without passengers, and after Kill tailed the car from behind, the male driver parked the car in front of him at Westminster Drive before he departed the scene.

Ronald Jones, firearms examiner of the Oklahoma City police ballistics unit, testified that the bullet found inside Busken's body was similar to the .22 calibre bullet found inside Sanchez's house, and it was more likely that they were fired from the same gun, since both bullets were compared and had the same number of land and groove marks. The shoeprints found at the scene were found to be made by a pair of Nike athletic shoes, and Kristen Martin Setzer, who lived together with Sanchez from 1994 to 1997, testified that Sanchez wore a similar pair of shoes from Nike. Additionally, there was evidence adduced that Busken's mobile phone, which was missing since her death, was still in use after her death, and that it was used to call several individuals, all of whom were acquainted with Sanchez. Forensic examiner Melissa Keith testified that based on the DNA results of the testing done on Sanchez's DNA samples and the ones found on the victim, the likelihood of DNA found on Busken's clothing belonging to someone other than Sanchez was in the trillions. Former state criminalist Kent Neeland also testified that he believed the DNA of Sanchez matched to the rapist-killer responsible for Busken's death and recounted how he informed the investigators.

On February 15, 2006, the jury returned with their verdict on conviction, unanimously finding Sanchez guilty of first-degree murder, rape and sodomy in Busken's death, and the sentencing trial of Sanchez commenced two days later.

The prosecution sought the death penalty by presenting the multitude of aggravating factors to demonstrate the cruelty and inhumane nature of the crime, and called out Sanchez for being a "heartless, merciless, cruel and depraved executioner". The defence, however, claimed that the death penalty eliminated the good apart from the evil in a criminal, and stated that mercy and compassion should be demonstrated to Sanchez by sentencing him to life imprisonment, but District Attorney Tim Kuykendall refuted the defence's argument by stating that there was neither mercy nor compassion shown to Busken before her death, and continued to urge the jury to sentence Sanchez to death for the "senseless" murder of 21-year-old Juli Busken.

On February 17, 2006, the same jury recommended the death penalty for Sanchez on the charge of murdering Busken. Imprisonment terms of 40 years and 20 years were simultaneously imposed for the charges of rape and sodomy respectively.

The trial judge, Justice William C. Hetherington, formally sentenced Anthony Sanchez to death for the "cold-blooded" murder of Juli Busken on June 6, 2006, nearly ten years after the death of Busken.

== Appeal process ==
After he was sentenced to death, Anthony Sanchez appealed against his death sentence. On December 14, 2009, Sanchez's direct appeal was rejected by the Oklahoma Court of Criminal Appeals.

On October 3, 2016, the U.S. Supreme Court rejected Sanchez's final appeal, and his death sentence was therefore confirmed. On that same day, two more condemned inmates from Oklahoma, Julius Jones and Phillip Dean Hancock, also lost their final appeals to the U.S. Supreme Court. All three of them (including Sanchez) became one of Oklahoma's 11 death row inmates eligible for execution, and the list increased to 16 as of March 2018.

A year after all his avenues of appeal were exhausted, on August 21, 2017, Sanchez's petition for a re-hearing of his case was dismissed by the Oklahoma Court of Criminal Appeals.

By February 2020, Sanchez was one of the 26 death row prisoners in Oklahoma who were eligible to be executed after exhausting all available appeals against their respective death sentences.

Sanchez, along with 27 other death row inmates, filed a lawsuit against the state challenging Oklahoma's execution protocol. However, the lawsuit was dismissed in June 2022 when the courts determined that there was no violation of the constitution in Oklahoma's death penalty laws.

== Execution of Sanchez ==
=== Death warrant ===
In August 2022, six years after depleting his appeals, Anthony Sanchez was given a death warrant with a tentative execution date set for April 6, 2023. However, in January 2023, the Oklahoma Court of Criminal Appeals issued a court order to reschedule Sanchez's execution to September 21, 2023. Additionally, the execution dates of six other death row inmates — Jemaine Cannon, Phillip Dean Hancock, James Ryder, Michael Dewayne Smith, Wade Lay, and Richard Glossip — were also postponed between 2023 and 2024.

=== Final appeals ===
During the final months before he was to be executed, Sanchez filed a final series of appeals to avoid the death sentence. Sanchez argued that he was innocent and the real killer was actually his father Thomas Glen Sanchez, who died by suicide in 2022. According to Charlotte Beattie, a longtime girlfriend of Sanchez's father, she testified in a sworn statement that Thomas first confessed to the murder of Busken in 2020, and she added that in 2021, Thomas admitted to the murder a second time, claiming he should have done a better job in killing Busken. Sanchez, in fact, had been maintaining his innocence throughout the years while appealing against his death sentence and murder conviction. Sanchez's lawyers claimed that the police's sketch of the killer resembled Thomas more than his son, and that the eyewitness of Busken's abduction felt that the suspect looked older than Busken for a few years.

However, the prosecution rejected Sanchez's contention on the grounds that part from the DNA evidence, the other objective evidence, including ballistic evidence and a shoe print belonging to Sanchez found at the scene of crime, had proven Sanchez's guilt, and former Cleveland County district attorney Tim Kuykendall stated that he was very certain that Sanchez was guilty of the rape-murder instead of his father. He also criticized Sanchez's newfound claims of innocence as a "ploy by his family and defense team to detract from his guilt". In the end, the Oklahoma Court of Criminal Appeals rejected Sanchez's appeal, and stated that the arguments put forward by the defence were merely hearsay evidence, which never held much weight in light of the compelling evidence to prove Sanchez's guilt.

As a final recourse to escape the death penalty, Sanchez had the right to petition for clemency from the Oklahoma Pardon and Parole Board. Should a five-member panel of the parole board voted to recommend clemency for Sanchez, the governor would decide whether to reject clemency or grant clemency to commute Sanchez's death sentence to life in prison without the possibility of parole. However, Sanchez wanted to waive his right to a clemency hearing and opted to prove his innocence through court appeals. He also cited there was little chance that Governor Kevin Stitt would downgrade his sentence to life imprisonment, given that Stitt had only done so once, to former death row inmate Julius Jones, whose death sentence was reduced to life in prison hours before his scheduled execution on November 18, 2021.

A final appeal was filed to the U.S. Supreme Court prior to Sanchez's execution. Sanchez asked for a stay of execution on the grounds that his new lawyer needed more time to review his case and seek a judicial review. In response, Oklahoma Attorney General Gentner Drummond said in his statement that Sanchez remorselessly made the "ludicrous" allegation that his father murdered Busken even though there was sufficient DNA evidence to prove his guilt, and added that the Attorney General's Office already concluded based on DNA testing that Sanchez's father was not the killer and the results linking Sanchez to the murder was not an error. The Attorney General's Office also submitted in a filing, "The odds of randomly selecting an individual with the same genetic profile are 1 in 200 trillion Caucasians, 1 in 20 quadrillion African Americans, and 1 in 94 trillion Southwest Hispanics." Additionally, reverse paternity tests compared the DNA of Sanchez's father to that of the DNA recovered from the crime scene, indicated that Thomas was the father of the man whose DNA was found at the murder scene, further proving that Sanchez was indeed guilty of murder. On September 21, 2023, the date of Sanchez's scheduled execution, about 30 minutes before the execution procedure was set to commence, the U.S. Supreme Court rejected Sanchez's appeal and ordered his execution to move forward.

=== Execution ===
Nearly an hour after the U.S. Supreme Court dismissed his appeal, 44-year-old Anthony Castillo Sanchez was put to death by lethal injection at the Oklahoma State Penitentiary. In his last words, Sanchez continued to maintain his innocence, and criticized his former attorneys and thanked his supporters. After receiving a three-drug lethal injection cocktail at 10.08am, Sanchez was pronounced dead at 10.19am.

In response to the execution of Sanchez, Drummond, who attended the execution, stated that justice was finally served for Busken nearly 27 years after she died. Drummond added that he hoped that the execution would provide some measure of peace to her family and friends. Although Busken's family did not attend the execution, Drummond, who contacted the family in the months before Sanchez was put to death, said that the family was "at peace" with the execution of Sanchez.

== Aftermath ==
When the rape and murder of Juli Busken happened, the students and staff of the University of Oklahoma were shocked and saddened to hear about her death. Many of her friends described Busken as a woman who took "immense delight in life" and contributed to the community. Mary Margaret Holt, associate dean of the College of Fine Arts, described Busken as a "gritty little girl" who had much discipline and physical strength in fulfilling her passion as a ballet dance teacher. Many of Busken's fellow students attended her funeral, which was held on December 23, 1996. A total of 300 mourners turned up for Busken's funeral.

In memory of Juli Busken after her death, the University of Oklahoma created a dance scholarship in her name for the College of Fine Arts. In a 2011 interview, David Boren, the president of the University of Oklahoma, stated that he was acquainted with Busken and fondly remembered her performance in the musical Swan Lake the semester before she was killed. Boren described Busken as a "beautiful spirit" who exhibited the grace and aura of a ballet dancer even as she walked daily on the campus. The Juli Busken Memorial Scholarship was first awarded to its first recipient, a ballerina student named Billie Jean Kandravi, in 2012.

In 2011, Joe Lester, then police chief of Norman who had since promoted to Cleveland County's sheriff, revealed in an interview that he vividly recalled the horrific death of Busken, whom he described as a young woman with a brilliant future, and sympathized with her plight. Former Cleveland County District Attorney Tim Kuykendall similarly recalled the case, remembering the grisly details of the crime and recalled the moment when Busken's parents sat in court to hear the trial of their daughter's killer.

== See also ==
- Capital punishment in Oklahoma
- List of people executed in Oklahoma
- List of people executed in the United States in 2023

Executions carried out in Oklahoma
Preceded by Jermaine Monteil Cannon July 20, 2023	Anthony Castillo Sanchez; September 21, 2023	Succeeded by Phillip Dean Hancock November 30, 2023
Executions carried out in the United States
Preceded by James Barnes – Florida August 3, 2023	Anthony Castillo Sanchez – Oklahoma; September 21, 2023	Succeeded by Michael Duane Zack III – Florida October 3, 2023
