= Red Rock Canyon Adventure Park (Oklahoma) =

Red Rock Canyon Park
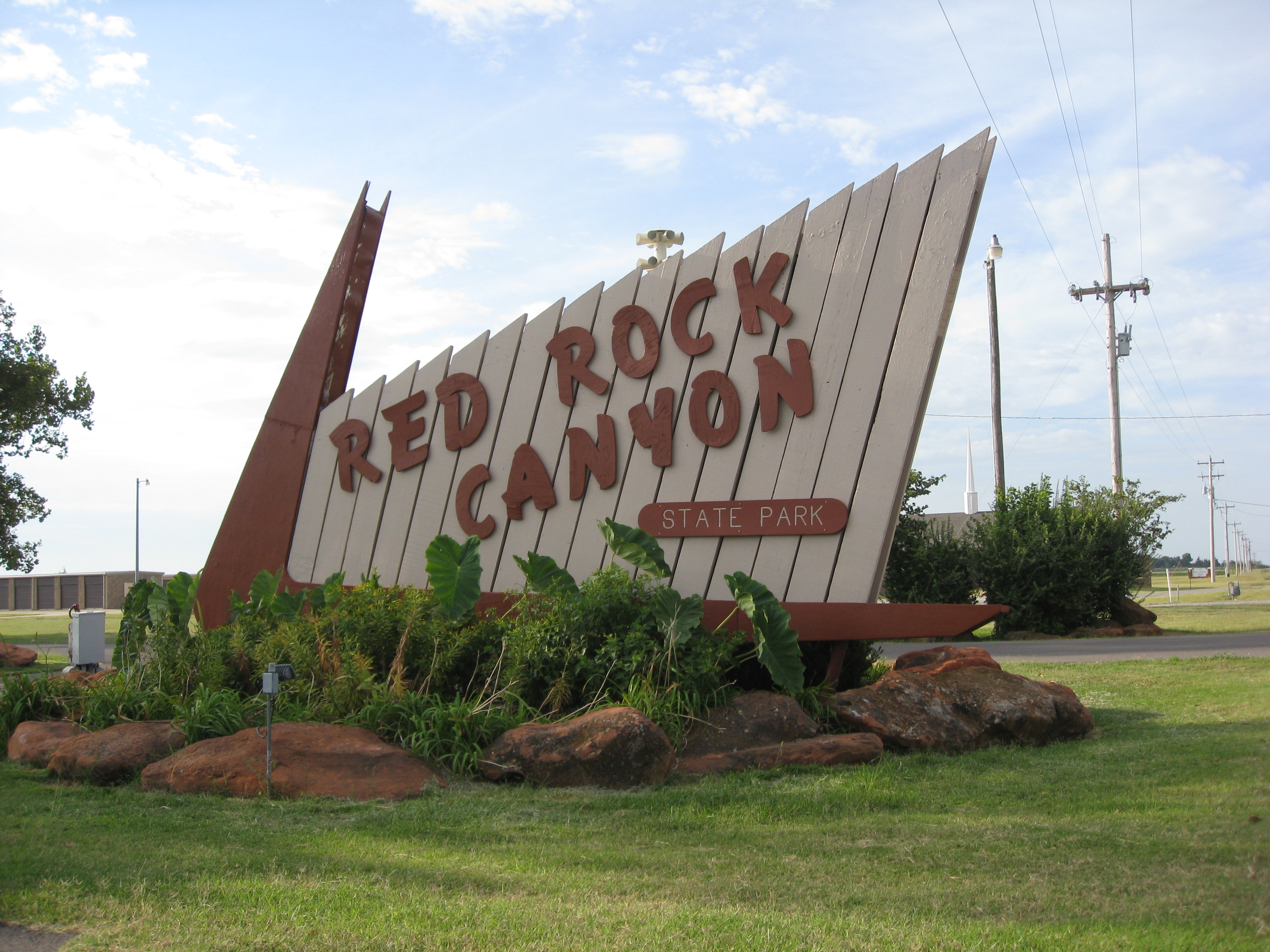

- Location within Oklahoma
- Location: Caddo County, Oklahoma, United States
- Nearest city: Hinton, OK
- Coordinates: 35°26′57″N 98°21′07″W
- Area: 310 acres (130 ha)
- Governing body: Oklahoma Tourism and Recreation Department
- Website: www.travelok.com/listings/view.profile/id.6275

Red Rock Canyon Adventure Park, previously Red Rock Canyon State Park, is located 1 mile (1.6 km) south of Hinton in Caddo County, Oklahoma. Before the settlement of Oklahoma, the area was used by Plains Indians as a winter campsite. The canyon was a stop on the California Road where settlers would gather fresh water and repair their wagons. Wagon wheel ruts are still visible in the park. The canyon has the only remaining site of native Caddo maple trees.

Park activities include rappelling down the canyon, walking on nature trails, hiking on a rocky trail, and fishing. There are picnic areas and group picnic shelters, a playground, a swimming pool and bathhouse. There are tent and RV campsites inside the canyon. The park and surrounding area have good opportunities for fall foliage-viewing.

Care must be taken while hiking in the canyon as the area is known for rattlesnakes. Copperhead snakes, while uncommon, have been reported in the area.

== Park history ==
The park area, originally known as Kiwanis Canyon Park, was donated to the State of Oklahoma in 1956 by the City of Hinton, the Hinton Kiwanis Club, and one other individual. The 310-acre park was renamed Red Rock Canyon State Park.

In March 2017, the Oklahoma Department of Tourism and Recreation published a list of 16 state parks that might be closed to help offset a reduction in its budget for 2018. Red Rock Canyon State Park was on this list. The list represented approximately one-half of the parks remaining after the department closed seven parks in 2011.

On November 1, 2018, the state ceased operating the park. The Oklahoma Department of Tourism and Recreation leased the park to the Town of Hinton, Oklahoma. It is now operated privately under the Red Rock Canyon Adventure Park name.
