= Hank Skinner =

American convicted murderer (1962–2023)

- Born: Henry Watkins Skinner; April 4, 1962; Danville, Virginia, U.S.
- Died: February 16, 2023 (aged 60); Galveston, Texas, U.S.
- Television: On Death Row
- Conviction: Capital murder

Henry Watkins Skinner (April 4, 1962 – February 16, 2023) was an American death row inmate in Texas. In 1995, he was convicted of bludgeoning to death his live-in girlfriend, Twila Busby, and stabbing to death her two adult sons, Randy Busby and Elwin Caler. On March 24, 2010, twenty minutes before his scheduled execution (second execution date), the U.S. Supreme Court issued a stay of execution to consider the question of whether Skinner could request testing of DNA his attorney chose not to have tested at his original trial in 1994. A third execution date for November 9, 2011, was also ultimately stayed by the Texas Court of Criminal Appeals on November 7, 2011.

On March 6, 2011, the Supreme Court issued an opinion holding that Skinner could sue under 42 U.S.C. § 1983 (see Civil Rights Act of 1871), claiming that Texas' rules for seeking post-conviction DNA testing upon which the judges relied were too narrow or restrictive. The ruling did not specifically grant Skinner the DNA testing he had been seeking, but on June 1, 2012, the Texas attorney general's office finally agreed to the analysis of the evidence required by the defense.

On November 14, 2012, the Texas Attorney General's office released an advisory to the Gray County state district court that convicted Skinner advising the court that the DNA testing further implicated Skinner in the Busby family murders. Among the findings: Skinner's blood was found in numerous places in the back bedroom where Busby's two sons were murdered. Skinner's DNA was also found on the handle of a bloody knife, but along with DNA from one of the sons and an "unknown contributor". Skinner's attorney, Rob Owen, requested additional DNA testing to identify DNA from an "unknown contributor" on the knife and in the back bedroom. Additionally, the state lost a bloody jacket found under Twila Busby's arm which Skinner claimed belonged to her uncle, Robert Donnell, a convicted felon and accused molester of Twila – Skinner claimed that Donnell was the real killer.

On August 29, 2013, a private Virginia laboratory published the results of tests conducted on four hairs found in the hand of the slain woman, Twila Busby – and three of them showed a family link with the three victims, but did not belong to them, with only one of them belonging to Skinner. These results could incriminate Robert Donnell, a deceased (1997) maternal uncle, who Twila Busby had told friends had molested her on multiple occasions and who had threatened her shortly before the murders.

On February 3 and 4, 2014 an evidentiary hearing took place in Pampa, Texas. "Prosecutors argued that the tests only confirmed Skinner's guilt, while lawyers for the 51-year-old defendant said the results raised enough questions about the identity of the perpetrator that a jury would not have condemned him to death." In July 2014, Judge Steven Emmert issued a ruling saying that "it was 'reasonably probable' Skinner would have still been convicted of a triple murder even if recently conducted DNA evidence had been available at his 1995 trial". The Attorneys for Skinner said they would appeal the decision to the Texas Court of Criminal Appeals.

Skinner was scheduled to be executed on September 13, 2023, his sixth scheduled execution date. However, he died in February of that year.

== Circumstances surrounding the murders ==
The murders occurred on December 31, 1993, at 804 East Campbell Avenue in Pampa, Texas. Skinner was convicted of the murders on March 18, 1995, and sentenced to death.

Skinner lived with the victims and admitted that he was in the home when the murders took place, but claimed he was in a comatose condition from a near lethal dose of codeine and alcohol. In a letter published in April 2010, Skinner put forth a new claim that he was colorblind and accidentally ingested the near-lethal mix because he had confused the victim's "fuchsia pink" glass (which contained codeine) with his own "baby blue" glass. Twila Busby was murdered in the living room just feet from the couch where Skinner claims he was lying passed out on a sofa.

After the murders, Skinner claimed he was roused off the couch by one of the mortally wounded victims – Elwin "Scooter" Caler. Caler died on the porch of a neighbor of Twila Busby. Skinner made his way to the home of Andrea Joyce Reed, four blocks away, and she let him in. Reed initially testified that Skinner threatened her if she called the police. Later, however, Reed recanted that claim and said Skinner merely "told" her not to call the police – never actually threatening her.

Skinner was arrested several hours later, being found in the darkened front bedroom of Reed's home. When he was arrested, Skinner was wearing clothes bearing blood spatters that were DNA-matched to two of the victims.

== Postponed execution and campaign for DNA testing ==
Despite pending litigation, Skinner was given an execution date for November 9, 2011. Gray County District Attorney Lynn Switzer (the respondent in Skinner's lawsuit) had written, in a brief to the court filed on June 2, 2011, that "Texas satisfied all the requirements of constitutional due process when it offered Skinner the opportunity to test the DNA evidence at trial."

In March, the U.S. Supreme Court held that a civil suit against Switzer, over post-conviction DNA testing, could proceed – but did not rule on whether Skinner should be given access to the actual evidence.

A new Texan law, SB 122, took effect on September 1, 2011. SB 122 intends to ensure that procedural barriers do not prevent prisoners from testing biological evidence that was not previously tested or could be subjected to newer testing. On September 6, 2011, Skinner's attorneys filed a motion in state district court in Gray County, Texas, to compel DNA testing of key pieces of evidence that have never been tested. However, on November 2, 2011, Judge Steven R. Emmert of the district court of Gray County denied the third motion of DNA testing introduced by the defense, without explaining his decision.

On November 7, 2011, the Texas Court of Criminal Appeals stayed Skinner's most recent execution so that a determination could be made about whether Texas law allowed for DNA evidence from the crime scene to be tested.

On June 1, 2012, one month after an oral argument at the Texas Court of Criminal Appeals, the Texas attorney general's office said it no longer opposed a death row inmate's request for DNA testing his attorneys said could prove his innocence.

In November 2012, a further analysis of DNA evidence found Skinner's blood on numerous objects and furniture in the back bedroom where Busby's sons were murdered. It also found Skinner's DNA, along with that of Caler (one of the sons) and an unidentified third contributor on the handle of a knife found on the front porch.

== U.S. Supreme Court issues ==
=== March 2011 ruling ===
On July 22, 2010, Skinner's lawyer presented his brief to the U.S. Supreme Court. In it, he asked one question: "may a convicted prisoner seeking access to biological evidence for DNA testing assert that claim in a civil rights action under 42 U.S.C. § 1983, or is such a claim cognizable only in a petition for writ of habeas corpus?"

Skinner's lawyer's brief also noted: "Mr. Skinner's suit for access to DNA evidence does not challenge the validity of his underlying conviction or sentence."

Skinner's petition was heard by the Supreme Court on October 13, 2010, at 10:00. The oral argument was widely covered by, among other media, the Washington Post.

On March 7, 2011, the decision of the Supreme Court agreed that the civil rights action was appropriate in this case.

Justice Ruth Bader Ginsburg wrote that a Section 1983 suit was available in cases where the relief sought by the inmate would

not "necessarily imply the invalidity of his conviction or sentence." Since there was no telling whether the results of the tests Mr. Skinner sought would establish his guilt, clear him or be inconclusive, she wrote, the suit was proper.

Skinner echoed this strategy to a CNN reporter: "all the District Attorney's gotta do is turn over the evidence, test it and let the chips fall where they may. If I'm innocent, I go home, if I'm guilty I die..."

== Issues and claims surrounding the case ==
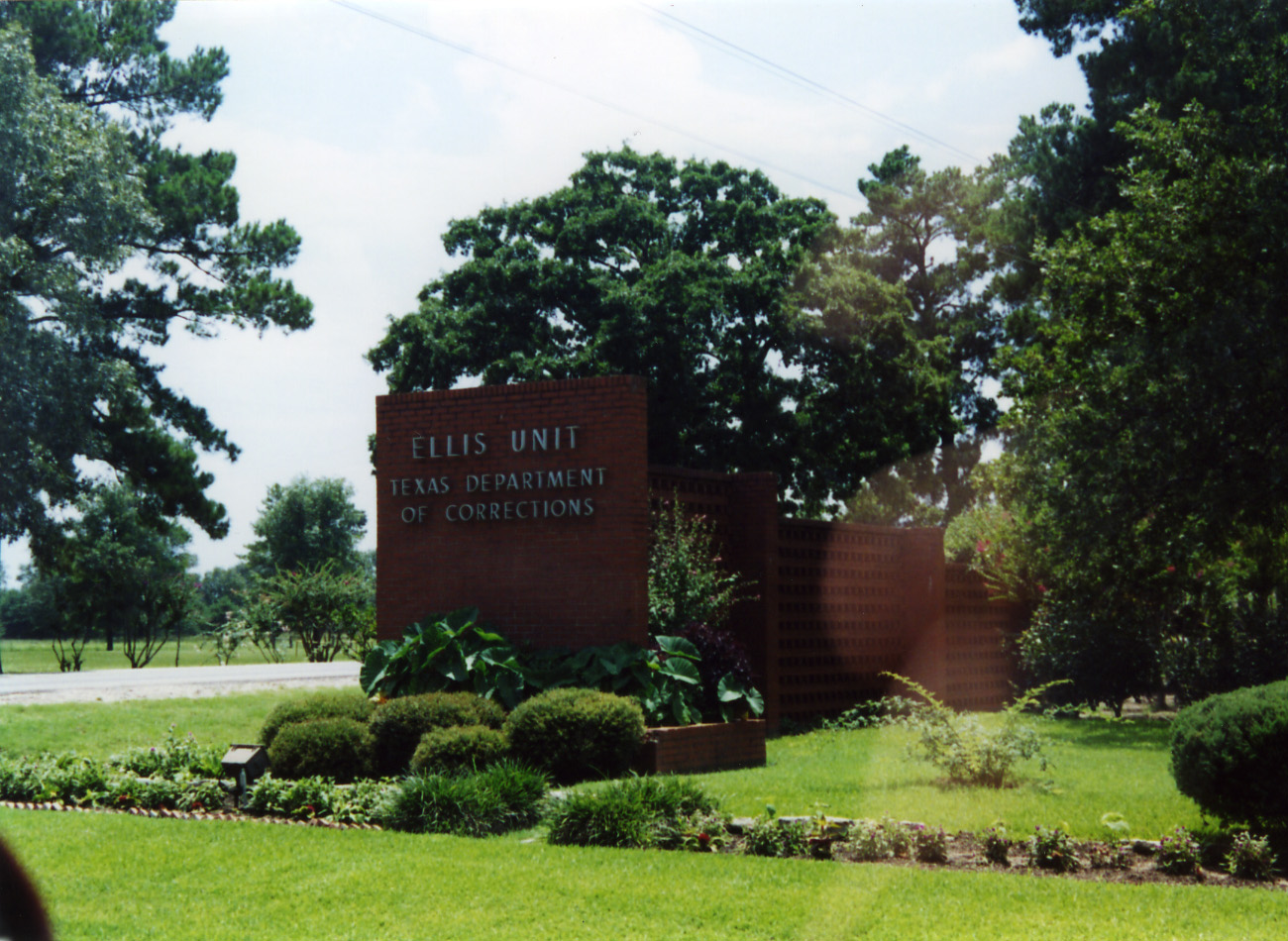
Originally Skinner was incarcerated in the Ellis Unit in Walker County, Texas

=== Background ===
On March 24, 2010, thirty-five minutes before the scheduled execution, the U.S. Supreme Court granted Skinner a stay of execution to allow time to consider his petition for writ of certiorari.

On May 24, 2010, the U.S. Supreme Court announced that it would review Skinner's case. The justices agreed to grant full review of the issue his lawyers raised: whether prisoners can use a federal civil-rights law to request DNA testing after their convictions.

At issue was whether post-conviction DNA testing is a civil right even though the DNA, in this case, was available at trial but Harold Comer, the appointed attorney of Skinner at trial, chose not to have it tested at the time because he believed it could be damaging to the case. Comer later stated that, although he stood by his trial strategy, he would now request the testing. According to Professor David Protess, "Comer failed to request DNA testing, or present compelling evidence about the alternative suspect. And, at the sentencing hearing, he failed to object to using Skinner's prior convictions – which he had prosecuted – to justify the death penalty.".

Gray County District Attorney Lynn Switzer responded to the Supreme Court's decision to hear Skinner's case in a letter to an Amarillo News Station. Switzer accused Skinner of "gaming the system" and said that, on two previous appeals, Skinner had failed to show how additional testing could exonerate him. Switzer's position was based on the decisions of The Texas Court of Criminal Appeals (CCA), which had written, "The Appellant's request to compare fingerprint evidence would not provide a reasonable probability of the Appellant's innocence, but instead would only demonstrate the presence of a third party." So the position of the Texas authorities was that the existence of a third party, being not an actual proof of innocence, was not a point to investigate.

=== Claims against trial counsel ===
Comer was a former district attorney who had prosecuted Skinner in earlier cases, before losing his position and pleading guilty to criminal charges over the mishandling of cash seized in drug cases. The Washington Post cited Comer's appointment as a possible case of cronyism, where Comer was appointed to a highly paid case by a friend in order to help him raise the funds needed to pay off his overdue federal income taxes:

Comer had twice personally prosecuted Skinner for other crimes, which created a potential conflict for him in defending Skinner. State law required the judge to hold a hearing on the question, then give Skinner the option of a new lawyer if it became clear in the hearing that Comer had a conflict. But according to the trial record, Sims, who was aware of Comer's history with Skinner, did not hold such a hearing. Sims later approved $86,000 in legal fees for Comer's work in the case, one of the biggest sums ever paid to a court-appointed attorney in Texas. At the time, Comer was in debt to the Internal Revenue Service for about the same amount, according to court documents.

Comer stated, repeated on a 2018 episode of HLN's investigative series "Death Row Stories", that right or wrong, he knowingly chose to not DNA test every single piece of evidence in order to at least give his client grounds for future delays of his execution, by requesting tests at some future date.

=== Witness recants testimony ===
The main accusation witness was Andrea Joyce Reed, who owned the house where Skinner was found by police several hours after the murders. After the trial, Reed recanted several specific elements of her testimony. Reed's daughter's testimony, however, contradicted portions of the new claims and ultimately a magistrate found Reed's recantation not to be credible.

Reed claimed that she had given false testimony at trial after having been threatened to be charged as an accomplice to capital murder, to have her children taken away and to have her daughter called to testify at trial. Among the new claims, Reed said that Skinner told her not to call anybody but did not threaten to kill her (as Reed testified in court). Reed also claimed that she believed Skinner's sentence "I have kicked Twila. She's dead" to be "a drunken fantasy like the other violent stories that he told me to explain how he was injured."

Skinner never commented on if he asked Reed not to call anybody that night. According to Skinner, the phone cable was jerked out of the wall, and nobody could call from the crime scene"

=== Occupational therapist testimony ===
"Occupational therapist Joe Tarpley testified at trial that, as result of an injury sustained six months before the murders, he believed Mr. Skinner's right hand's grasping strength was half normal at the time of the murders. Tarpley testified he didn't believe Skinner would have had the strength needed to choke Ms. Busby with enough force to break her larynx and hyoid bone."

=== Toxicology testimony ===
At trial, the defense's toxicology expert, Dr. Lowry, had stated that based on the alcohol and codeine in his blood, Skinner was too intoxicated to be able to physically commit the murders, but his testimony was weakened by the original statements of Reed, which led the jury to accept the prosecution's theory that Skinner had developed a resistance to alcohol and codeine which would have allowed him to function even under heavy doses. Lowry did not testify to when, exactly, Skinner ingested the codeine. The timing of the codeine ingestion was called into question, but at trial, prosecution witness Howard Mitchell claimed that 90 minutes before the crime, Skinner was lying on the living room couch completely unresponsive.

Harold Kalant, professor emeritus of toxicology and pharmacology at the University of Toronto, reviewed several of Skinner's trial documents. Based on his review, Kalant wrote "I wouldn't be surprised if the heavy drinker would be able to move about somewhat, but he would be very confused and badly impaired, and would have difficulty standing or walking in a coordinated manner". Kalant based his calculations on the assumption that Skinner consumed the alcohol and codeine at 9:30 the evening of the murders.

=== Theory about alternative suspect and rape ===
Shortly before the murders Twila Busby had been threatened by an uncle (killed in an automobile accident when drunk driving on January 5, 1997), Robert Donnell. Though Skinner and his legal team raised questions, Donnell was never considered as a suspect by the D.A. or the police.

"The Skeptical Juror" reported on an interview with Howard Mitchell (the man who drove Twila Busby to the New Year's Eve Party) by an investigator with the DA's office. According to Mitchell, Donnell had a history of violent behavior, and attempted rape. Cliff Carpenter, an investigator for Skinner's appellate team, claimed to have spoken with Donnell's widow, Willie Mae Gardner, and neighbor Deborah Ellis who called Gardner "Grandmother" though they were not related. According to Carpenter, Gardner told him Donnell came home very late the night of the murders, and also that he thoroughly washed the interior of the truck, cleaned the truck's carpets and repainted the truck within a week of the murders.

During cross-examination, at an evidentiary hearing in 2005, Ellis testified that she did not see any blood in the truck and that Donnell was just cleaning the truck.

According to the Texas Department of Public Safety, Donnell had no prior criminal history. According to the affidavit of Cliff Carpenter, Donnell had a criminal history in Oklahoma, for theft, embezzlement and burglary in the 1950s, and served three years in prison in 1989 for auto theft. According to the State of Oklahoma, Robert E. Donnell (white/male, born May 5, 1930, 5'8" and 191 lbs.) was incarcerated for 7 years (which may have included parole) for one conviction of auto theft beginning on November 29, 1988. Other arrests are recorded in Oklahoma, and they include grand larceny (7/01/83), and DUI (6/05/87). No assaultive offense is attributed to Donnell.

There is also an affidavit by Ronald Campbell, an acquaintance of Twila Busby, who said that on the night of the murders he tried to place a collect call to Busby from the Gray County Jail, where he was an inmate, around 11:00 PM (2300 hrs). Campbell claimed that the oldest son answered but couldn't summon Twila Busby to the phone. Campbell claimed the boy sounded "upset and scared." Campbell also claimed he could hear the noise of "one hell of a fight," in the background, and the deep voice of an unknown male individual who wasn't Skinner. Phone records didn't corroborate Campbell's statements – so his testimony was not used at trial.

On November 14, 2012, the Texas Attorney General indicated that test results on the rape kit indicated that Twila Busby had not been raped.

=== Claims of color-blindness and accidental codeine ingestion ===
It was never clearly determined exactly how Skinner ingested the codeine which he said made him comatose. Skinner's website has always claimed "it is believed that he was either accidentally or intentionally poisoned by the addition of the [codeine] pills to his drinks."

In an April 2010 letter responding to what Skinner called "false and undocumented allegations" circulating on the web, Skinner put forth a new theory that he was colorblind at the time and drank from the wrong cup.

Skinner explained: "A few years ago I learned that truth from a toxicologist who testified in another guy's case, here. He says that once you reach a certain level of intoxication you go colorblind. Twila was always putting pills in her drink and sipping that one drink all evening. I later learned her girlfriend (G.S.) had given her 13 Fiorinal #4 codeine that she'd put in her drink. Twila and I had identical glasses but hers was fuschia pink, mine was baby medium blue. I vaguely remember seeing the dregs of pills in the bottom of my cup and getting sick, passing out. I couldn't figure out how it got into my cup. So I thought someone must have poisoned me. I think now I was just too messed up and colorblind to tell our cups apart anymore, I accidentally got Twila's cup and drank from it, thinking it was my cup."

== DNA issue ==
=== Unanalyzed crime scene objects ===
Skinner and his appellate team repeatedly tried to obtain a DNA analysis on seven other items found at the crime scene; including fingernail clippings, a knife found on the porch of Busby's house and a second knife found in a plastic bag in the house, a towel with the second knife, a jacket next to Busby's body and any hairs found in her hands that were not destroyed in previous testing, and vaginal swabs taken from Twila Busby at the time of her autopsy.

At the time of the trial, DNA analysis had been performed only on the clothes that Skinner was wearing at the time of his arrest, and the results were incriminating because DNA of two of the victims was found on the clothes.

On November 14, 2012, the Texas Attorney General released a statement indicating that Skinner's DNA, and that of an unknown contributor, was found on the bloody knife on the front porch. Skinner's blood was also found in numerous places in the bedroom where Busby's two sons were murdered – somewhere Skinner's blood had not previously been found. The jacket, found next to Busby's body, was lost by the state and was not available for testing.

=== Analysis of hair clutched in victim's hand ===
During the post-conviction appeals, DNA analysis of only the hairs clutched in Twila's hand were tested and the results may have been either exculpatory (one of the head hairs and an unmatched fingerprint found on a plastic bag containing a bloodied knife excluded Skinner), or inconclusive, and no further analysis was made. All the requests for DNA testing of the other items were denied on the grounds that Skinner's trial attorney did not seek DNA analysis. Lynn Switzer, the Gray County District Attorney, claimed that additional testing would not prove Hank Skinner's innocence.

The claim that Twila Busby had been raped was not raised at Skinner's trial. Further, medical examiner Elizabeth Peacock testified at trial that Twila Busby was not raped.

An analysis of the rape kit, conducted in November 2012, showed Twila Busby had not been raped. The hair in Busby's hand was from Busby and a knife found on the front porch contained Skinner's DNA on the handle along with DNA from an "unknown contributor."

=== Skinner vs. Switzer ===
On November 27, 2009, the defense team filed a complaint in federal court against the Gray County DA, Lynn Switzer, for refusing to release the evidence to the defense for private DNA testing, which she could conceivably do without a court order. On January 15, the magistrate in charge of the complaint recommended that it be dismissed and on January 20, the Federal district Judge affirmed the dismissal. This decision is being appealed at the Federal Court of Appeals. In January 2010, Hank Skinner wrote to Lynn Switzer a letter where he states that his former prosecutor John Mann lied about the results of the hair analysis, and concludes his letter "All what I am asking you, Madam, is to do the right thing and test the evidence."

The right for Skinner to bring suit under Civil Rights laws claiming that Texas law regarding post-conviction DNA testing was too restrictive was affirmed by the Supreme Court in March 2011.

=== Texas Criminal Justice Reform Law ===
On May 26, 2011, the Senate of Texas voted unanimously for the Senate Bill 122, a Criminal Justice Reform Bill, expanding access to post-conviction DNA testing. This bill, would allow post-conviction testing "whenever there is biological evidence that has not previously been tested, or when the evidence can be subjected to newer techniques that might be more revealing than the results of an older test." The passing of this law would prevent Texas courts from blocking access to DNA testing in cases where DNA was not tested through "no fault of the defendant."

Texas Senator Rodney Ellis, who authored the bill, said: "Under current law, innocence is often being left to chance [...] Strengthening Texas' post-conviction DNA law is an essential measure to improve justice in Texas." The bill was signed into law on June 17, 2011, effective September 11, 2011.

== Post-conviction history ==
=== Marriage ===
Skinner married Sandrine Ageorges while on Texas death row in 2008. Ageorges-Skinner, a French national, has been an anti-death penalty activist for more than thirty years – well before she met Skinner. She had corresponded with numerous death row inmates and participated in numerous protests against the death penalty. Ageorges-Skinner was banned from visiting or corresponding with Skinner because of violations of prison policies – a charge both claimed was fabricated. The Texas Department of Criminal Justice refuses to release records, so the claim cannot be supported or contradicted. Ageorges-Skinner received the official support of the French Government in her persistent efforts to save her husband from execution and prove his innocence. France generally opposes the death penalty in all cases.

=== Defense team ===
For the post-conviction appeals, Rob Owen, co-director of the University of Texas at Austin School of Law's Capital Punishment Clinic was appointed to represent Skinner. Owen represented Skinner from 2004 onwards, after his previous court-appointed attorney, Steven Losch, died. Skinner's new defense team obtained an evidentiary hearing in November 2005.

=== Partial appeal accepted, then rejected ===
On May 14, 2008, a limited certificate of appealability was granted. Skinner's consecutive appeal, a federal habeas corpus petition centering on inadequate performance by his trial attorney on issues involving the investigation of an alternative suspect and a blood spatter analysis, was denied by the United States Court of Appeals for the Fifth Circuit on July 14, 2009. On August 10, 2009, Skinner's Defense team introduced a new petition for a rehearing en banc with the 5th Circuit Court of Appeals. The petition was rejected on August 28, 2009.

=== Execution orders ===
On October 26, 2009, Judge Steven Emmert signed the order setting an execution date for Hank Skinner on February 24, 2010 (first execution date). The date was then changed to March 24, due to procedural errors which rendered the original mandate invalid.

After the SCOTUS decision, Skinner was given a new execution date of November 11, 2011. That date was stayed in order for the courts to consider Skinner's request for DNA testing.

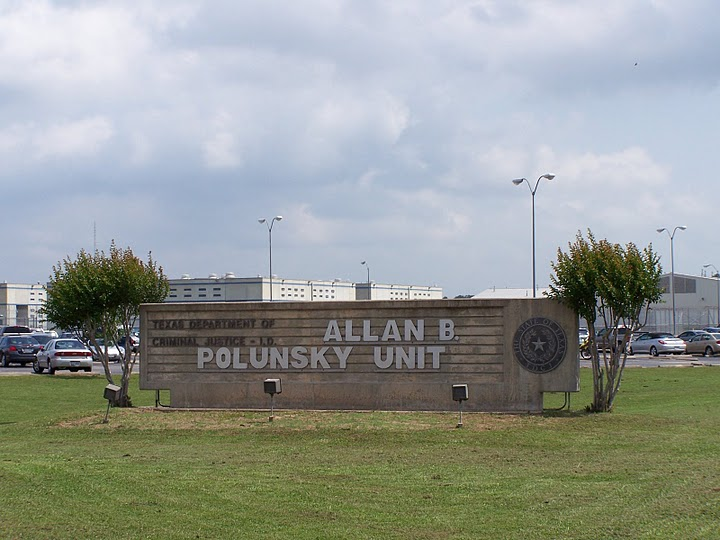
Allan B. Polunsky Unit

Skinner resided on death row in the Allan B. Polunsky Unit in Polk County, Texas.

=== Skinner's writings ===
Skinner authored of a series of self-published articles called "Hell Hole News" which covers a broad range of topics related to his case and the conditions on Texas' death row.

=== Prison issues: contraband cell phone and SIM ===
After a fellow death row inmate, Richard Tabler, used a smuggled cell phone to threaten a Texas state legislator from his jail cell, authorities conducted a series of raids aimed at confiscating the contraband phones. During the raids, according to a statement issued by TDCJ's spokesperson Michelle Lyons, two SIM cards were found hidden in Skinner's bible. Skinner denied having a cell phone, but an x-ray revealed an illegal cell phone hidden in his rectum.

== Death ==
Skinner died at Hospital Galveston in Galveston, Texas, on February 16, 2023. He was 60. His attorneys said he died due to complications following surgery in December 2022 to remove a brain tumor. He is buried at Captain Joe Byrd Cemetery.

== Articles and television coverage ==
On November 10, 2007, Al Jazeera International aired a two-part program titled American Justice – Fatal Flaws, the second part of which deals with wrongful convictions and evokes Skinner's case and that of Curtis McCarty, who was exonerated from Oklahoma's death row after 22 years.

As of February 2010, the Skinner case is included in the Medill Innocence project of Professor David Protess.

On February 24, Amarillo News Channel 10 posted its full, unedited exclusive 30-minute interview with Skinner.

In March 2010, The Skeptical Juror site carried a 10-part series reprising the facts of the Skinner case.

On March 24, the evening Skinner's execution was stayed, Ageorges-Skinner and Curtis McCarty were interviewed on Larry King Live. Both pleaded against the denial of analysis of the full available evidence and expressed their belief that Skinner is innocent.

On April 4, Twila Busby's daughter Lisa and Busby's uncle Dave Brito "broke years of silence" and gave an interview to News Channel 10 in Amarillo. Lisa was the only one in her family to survive the murders and chose "to stay at her aunt and uncles' place – keeping away from home because she was scared her mom's boyfriend [Hank Skinner] might turn violent after drinking that night at a New Year's Eve party." Lisa Busby also appeared to advocate for Skinner's execution. "We're suffering. We have no closure. We have no peace because he's still alive," she said. Lisa finished her interview by agreeing that the testing needed to be done, saying "I mean test the DNA and get it over with [...] That way we have something of peace and closure."

On April 22, 2010, Skinner wrote Channel 10 a letter to "clarify" statements he made in an interview that was aired nationally. On May 3 Channel 10 produced a follow-up piece containing Skinner's letter to them regarding the statement he made. The statement in question related to the "violent stabbing and death of the beating victims" in the February interview. On camera, Skinner said referring to the murders: "if it had to happen and it had to go that way I wished I had 'uv done it because I wouldn't have done 'em like that."

On May 25, 2010, Time published an article about the case: "In death penalty case, innocence has to matter".

On June 10, 2010, Politics Daily published a report of recent interviews of former jurors at Skinner's trial, which states "Many of the jurors interviewed were taken aback by the amount of untested evidence, stunned that even the blood on two of the murder weapons had not been analyzed. The seven jurors agreed that all the evidence should undergo DNA analysis."

On November 8, 2011, in the Huffington Post, David Protess described the succession of district attorneys who have prevented the DNA from being tested.

On March 22, 2012, episode 1 of the UK Channel 4 series Death Row focused on an hour-long interview granted with Skinner. Taken from 4's site: "Death Row is a documentary series written and directed by legendary feature filmmaker Werner Herzog."

== See also ==
- Capital punishment in Texas
