= Blaine Milam =

Executed American convicted murderer (1989–2025)

- Mug shot of Milam
- Born: Blaine Keith Milam; December 12, 1989; Gregg County, Texas, U.S.
- Died: September 25, 2025 (aged 35); Huntsville Unit, Texas, U.S.
- Status: Executed by lethal injection
- Motive: sexual assault, exorcism
- Conviction: Capital murder
- Penalty: Death

Details
- Victims: Amora Carson, 1
- Date: December 2, 2008
- Location: Rusk County, Texas
- Imprisoned at: Allan B. Polunsky Unit

Blaine Keith Milam (December 12, 1989 – September 25, 2025) was an American convicted murderer who was executed in 2025 for the 2008 murder of Amora Carson, his girlfriend's 13-month-old daughter.

== Early life ==
Milam was born on December 12, 1989, in Gregg County, Texas. He left school after completing the fourth grade. Prior to December 2008, he moved to Rusk County.

== Murder of Amora Carson ==
On December 2, 2008, 10 days before his 19th birthday, Milam called the police to report that he had found his girlfriend's 13-month-old daughter, Amora Carson (November 12, 2007 – December 2, 2008), dead. At the time, Milam was engaged to Amora's mother, Jessica Carson, and they were living in a trailer in Rusk County, Texas. Police arrived to find Amora's body with numerous severe injuries, including multiple bite marks and broken ribs. When questioned by police, both Milam and Carson initially said they had left Amora alone for about an hour before returning to find her dead. However, they later changed their stories, claiming that Amora had become possessed by demons, and that they had attempted to perform an exorcism on her.

A subsequent autopsy indicated that Amora had been beaten, strangled, sexually mutilated, and had 24 human bitemarks covering her entire body in what the medical examiner called the worst case of brutality he had ever seen. In 2010, Milam was sentenced to death. After his conviction and death sentence, Milam continued to maintain his innocence, arguing that Carson was responsible for Amora's murder, and that she was responsible for claiming that Amora was possessed by demons. Milam's lawyers later attempted to challenge his death sentence, both on the grounds that it was based on discredited forensic bite mark analysis, and that Milam himself was intellectually disabled and thus could not be constitutionally executed. According to the state, it was Milam who inflicted the injuries on Amora while Carson watched and did not intervene. Carson was later sentenced to life in prison without the possibility of parole for her role in the crime.

== Execution ==
Milam's execution was stayed in 2019 and 2021 to permit him to appeal his conviction and sentence, but these appeals failed, and the trial court had found that Milam was not intellectually disabled. The Supreme Court denied Milam's application for a stay of his execution on his scheduled execution date, September 25, 2025. Milam was executed by lethal injection later that day, at the Huntsville Unit in Huntsville, Texas.

In his final statement before his execution, he did not express remorse for his crimes and instead thanked his supporters, professed his Christian faith and expressed gratitude to the Texas Department of Criminal Justice for opening its prison chaplaincy program to death row inmates:

"I would like to give a special thanks to all of you for showing me kindness, compassion, empathy, love and support and believing in me. Thank you for everything that y'all have done. I would also like to thank the directors of chaplaincy of TDCJ for opening up the faith based program on death row and allowed me to be accepted into it to find Jesus Christ our Lord and Savior. And if any of you would like to see me again, I implore all of you no matter who you are to accept Jesus Christ as your Lord and Savior and we will meet again. I love you all, bring me home Jesus."

Milam was one of the two American inmates executed that day; the other being Geoffrey Todd West in Alabama, who shot and killed Margaret Berry during a robbery.

== In popular culture ==
The Investigation Discovery network aired an episode of Werner Herzog's series On Death Row titled "Blaine Milam" that the case in Season 2, Episode 3, broadcast on September 17, 2013.

== See also ==
- List of people executed in Texas, 2020–present
- List of people executed in the United States in 2025

Executions carried out in Texas
Preceded by Matthew Lee Johnson May 20, 2025	Blaine Keith Milam; September 25, 2025	Succeeded by Charles Victor Thompson January 28, 2026
Executions carried out in the United States
Preceded by Geoffrey Todd West – Alabama September 25, 2025	Blaine Keith Milam – Texas; September 25, 2025	Succeeded by Victor Tony Jones – Florida September 30, 2025
