= Duane Owen =

American murderer (1961–2023)

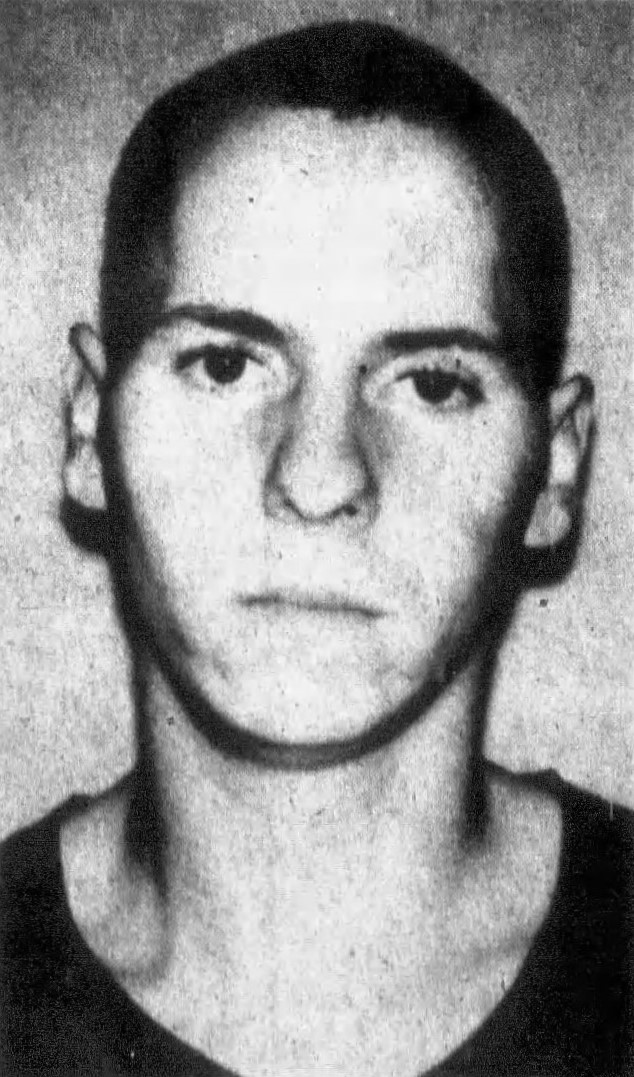
- Owen in a 1984 police mugshot
- Born: Duane Eugene Owen; February 13, 1961
- Died: June 15, 2023 (aged 62); Florida State Prison, Florida, U.S.
- Status: Executed by lethal injection
- Convictions: First-degree murder (x2); Attempted murder; Sexual battery; Attempted sexual battery; Burglary; Armed burglary (x3); Burglary with assault; Attempted escape
- Penalty: Murders; Death (x2); Armed burglary, burglary with assault, sexual battery and attempted murder Life imprisonment (x6)

Details
- Victims: 2
- Date: March 24, 1984; May 29, 1984
- Country: United States
- State: Florida
- Locations: Boca Raton, Florida; Delray Beach, Florida
- Date apprehended: May 30, 1984

Duane Eugene Owen (February 13, 1961 – June 15, 2023) was an American convicted murderer who raped and killed Karen Slattery and Georgianna Worden in Delray Beach and Boca Raton, Florida, in 1984. Owen was sentenced to death for the murders and was executed in 2023.

On March 24, 1984, Owen raped and stabbed 14-year-old Karen Slattery in Delray Beach. Two months later, on May 29, he raped and beat to death 38-year-old Georgianna Worden in Boca Raton. Owen was arrested the day after Worden's murder on a burglary charge. He confessed to the murders of Slattery and Worden after his arrest.

Owen was sentenced to death for the murders twice in two separate trials. Additionally, he received three life sentences for other violent crimes. Owen was executed by lethal injection for the murder of Worden on June 15, 2023.

== See also ==
- Capital punishment in Florida
- List of people executed in Florida
- List of people executed in the United States in 2023

Executions carried out in Florida
Preceded by Darryl Brian Barwick May 3, 2023	Duane Owen; June 15, 2023	Succeeded by James Barnes August 3, 2023
Executions carried out in the United States
Preceded by Michael Andrew Tisius – Missouri June 6, 2023	Duane Owen – Florida; June 15, 2023	Succeeded by Jemaine Monteil Cannon – Oklahoma July 20, 2023
