= James Phillip Barnes =

American murderer (1962–2023)

James Barnes
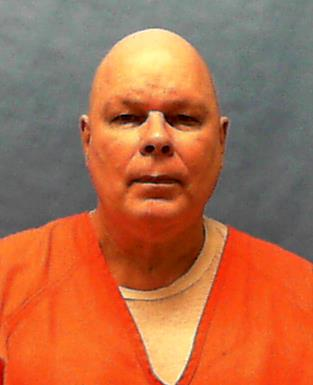
- Born: March 7, 1962
- Died: August 3, 2023 (aged 61); Florida State Prison, Florida, U.S.
- Status: Executed by lethal injection
- Convictions: First degree murder (2 counts); Possession of a firearm by a felon; Grand theft (3 counts); Burglary (2 counts); Armed burglary; Forgery (2 counts); Trafficking in Stolen Property (2 counts); Sexual battery (2 counts); Arson
- Penalty: Life imprisonment (January 9, 1998); Death (December 13, 2007)

Details
- Victims: Patricia "Patsy" Miller, 41; Linda V. Barnes, 44
- Date: April 20, 1988; December 11, 1997
- Country: United States
- State: Florida
- Date apprehended: December 12, 1997

James Phillip Barnes (March 7, 1962 – August 3, 2023) was an American murderer and self-identified serial killer who was executed by the state of Florida for the 1988 rape and murder of Patricia Miller. After converting to Islam and saying that he wanted to clear his conscience, he confessed to the murder in 2005, while already serving a life sentence for the 1997 murder of his wife.

In 2012, Barnes was featured in the first episode of Werner Herzog's television series On Death Row, in which he was interviewed in 2010 by Herzog at Florida State Prison. He then sent Herzog a written confession to the unsolved murders of Chester Wetmore and Brenda Fletcher in 1986 and 1991, respectively. He was not charged in either case.

== Early life ==
James Phillip Barnes was born on March 7, 1962. He was one of five siblings and had a twin sister, Jeannice. His younger brother Michael committed suicide. It is unknown where exactly Barnes was born, but he referred to his home as Maryland.

== Murders ==
On April 20, 1988, Barnes invaded the home of Patricia "Patsy" Miller, a 41-year-old nurse, in Melbourne, Florida. He entered through a bedroom window and confronted her at knifepoint before sexually assaulting her. He attacked her with a hammer and bound her with his shoelaces while she was lying face down on the bed. Barnes set fire to her bed in an attempt to conceal the crime before fleeing. A medical examiner later determined that Miller had died from blunt-force trauma to the head and had been killed before the fire was started. According to investigators, Barnes did not know Miller, and her murder went unsolved.

On December 11, 1997, Barnes strangled his estranged wife, 44-year-old Linda Barnes, at her home in West Melbourne, despite a restraining order that prohibited him from approaching her. After killing his wife, Barnes stuffed her body in a closet and remained at the house. On December 12, sheriff's deputies arrested Barnes at the house and he was charged with Linda's murder.

== Trial and revelation ==
On January 9, 1998, Barnes pleaded guilty to murdering Linda and was sentenced to life in prison without the possibility of parole. The death penalty was waived.

In 2005, Barnes, who had converted to Islam, confessed to the unsolved murder of Patricia Miller while fasting during Ramadan. Barnes sent a letter to the assistant state attorney confessing to the crime. In 1997, DNA evidence was matched to Barnes, and he had been questioned in the case. At the time, he had refused to talk with Brevard County authorities. No charges were filed until an indictment was issued by a Brevard County grand jury. In the letter, Barnes told prosecutors that he wanted to clear his conscience. Barnes said in the letter, "I murdered her [Patricia Miller] so [there] would be no witness or complaint against me."

At his trial for Miller's murder, Barnes waived his right to a jury and represented himself. In 2006, he pleaded guilty to the first-degree murder of Miller along with burglary, two counts of sexual battery with a weapon and arson. On December 13, 2007, Brevard County circuit court judge Lisa Davidson sentenced Barnes to death.

== Imprisonment ==
In 2010, Barnes was interviewed at Florida State Prison by German filmmaker Werner Herzog as part of his television series On Death Row. Six weeks later, Barnes sent a letter to Herzog confessing to the unsolved murders of Chester Wetmore and Brenda Fletcher. He said that he wished to resolve the unresolved crimes he committed before he died. Police investigated his claims, but he was not charged with either murder.

Barnes claimed that he had first met Wetmore in 1988, describing him as a runaway hooked on crystal meth and crack cocaine. Wetmore had been on the streets for a long time and was making money as a prostitute. He had been listed as a missing person since May 27, 1986. Barnes claimed that in 1988 Wetmore had stolen his belongings from his car, so Barnes killed Wetmore with a shotgun. He and two accomplices then buried Wetmore's body.

According to Barnes, Fletcher was a prostitute and crack cocaine addict without a family. In 1991, Barnes accused her of having stolen his wallet and demanded the return of his driver's license, but when Fletcher denied the theft, Barnes killed her. Fletcher's body was discovered on April 2, 1991, in a water-filled drainage ditch in Brevard County. Fletcher had been listed as a missing person at the time of her murder and the last time that she had contact with a family member was on October 22, 1990.

The interview with Barnes aired in 2012 as part of the series premiere. It included an interview with his twin sister Jeannice Barnes, but their father declined to be filmed and asked Herzog to tell his son: "One, I love him. Two, I hate the crimes he committed."

== Execution ==
On June 22, 2023, Florida governor Ron DeSantis signed Barnes's death warrant. Barnes was scheduled to be executed on August 3, 2023. His older sister Beth Catron wanted the execution to proceed and said of her brother's impending execution, "Our family is glad the nightmare will soon be over, and maybe we'll be able to sleep in peace."

At a hearing on June 27, 2023, Barnes stated his acceptance of responsibility for his crimes and asked to proceed to his execution without any delay.

On August 3, 2023, Barnes was executed via lethal injection at Florida State Prison, at age 61. He was pronounced dead at 6:13 p.m. He declined to eat a last meal, receive visitors, or make a final statement.

== See also ==
- Capital punishment in Florida
- Capital punishment in the United States
- Conversion to Islam in U.S. prisons
- List of people executed in Florida
- List of people executed in the United States in 2023
- Volunteer (capital punishment)

Executions carried out in Florida
Preceded by Duane Owen June 15, 2023	James Phillip Barnes; August 3, 2023	Succeeded by Michael Duane Zack III October 3, 2023
Executions carried out in the United States
Preceded by Johnny Allen Johnson – Missouri August 1, 2023	James Phillip Barnes – Florida; August 3, 2023	Succeeded by Anthony Castillo Sanchez – Oklahoma September 21, 2023
