= Michael Duane Zack III =

American murderer (1968–2023)

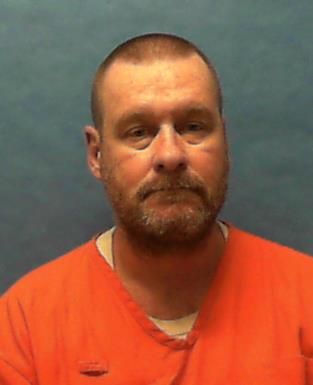
- Mug shot of Zack III
- Born: Michael Duane Zack III; December 14, 1968; Tallahassee, Florida, U.S.
- Died: October 3, 2023 (aged 54); Florida State Prison, Raiford, Florida, U.S.
- Cause of death: Execution by lethal injection
- Convictions: First degree murder (2 counts); Sexual battery; Armed robbery
- Penalty: Death

Details
- Victims: Laurie Barbara Russillo; Ravonne Kennedy Smith
- Date: June 12 – 13, 1996
- Country: United States
- State: Florida
- Locations: Florida Panhandle, Florida
- Imprisoned at: Florida State Prison

Michael Duane Zack III (December 14, 1968 – October 3, 2023) was a resident of Tallahassee who murdered two women he met at beach bars in Florida Panhandle in June 1996. Zack targeted Laurie Russillo at Okaloosa Island, and he strangled her to death before leaving her body on the beach. Within a day after murdering Russillo, Zack met his second victim Ravonne Smith at Pensacola Beach, and after entering her home, he sexually assaulted Smith and then fatally stabbed her. Zack was arrested two days later and charged for the murders. Zack was sentenced to life imprisonment for murdering Russillo, but he was additionally given the death penalty for Smith's murder. Zack was executed via lethal injection on October 3, 2023, 27 years after he killed both Smith and Russillo.

== Background ==
Michael Duane Zack III was born prematurely on December 14, 1968, after his mother got into a car accident. His mother reportedly abused alcohol while she was pregnant with Zack. Zack's father, a soldier, abandoned his family; after this, his mother remarried to another soldier. However, Zack's stepfather often abused Zack and his sisters during their childhood.

Zack's stepfather would regularly punch him, electrocute him using an electric blanket, make him wear the urine-soaked sheet around his neck, and forcibly place a heated spoon on his genitals. Other instances of abuse include Zack being slammed onto the wall or kicked with boots. Zack's stepfather also tried to drown him, poison him, and run him over with a car. When Zack was 3 years old, he was hospitalized after his stepfather force-fed him alcohol and drugs. Zack's stepfather also threatened to shoot and stab him on one occasion, and he sexually abused Zack and raped his sisters.

When Zack was 12, he was reportedly traumatized after he witnessed his 16-year-old stepsister murder his mother, Mary Helen Midkiff, 35, with an axe at their Fort Polk, Louisiana home in March 1981. After his mother's murder, Zack was placed into foster care.

During his adulthood, Zack turned to a life of crime, committing a long string of petty offences like theft and property-related offenses in Florida, Texas, Oklahoma and Tennessee; his first arrest in Florida was in December 1994 due to theft and probation violation in Volusia County. On another occasion, Zack was jailed for eight months at the Leon County Jail before his release in May 1996.

== 1996 North Florida murders ==
For a span of nine days in June 1996, a month after his release from prison, Michael Zack would commit more crimes, including the murder of two women in Florida Panhandle within North Florida.

=== Theft of firearms and truck ===
The events that culminated into the murders first happened on June 4, 1996. Prior to this date, Zack, who was recently released from prison, approached a bartender named Edith Pope, who drank with him and heard his story of witnessing his mother being killed by his sister. Pope took pity on the 27-year-old and allowed Zack to work at her bar. Zack's employment lasted until June 4, 1996, and when his girlfriend called and said he was being evicted, the bartender offered to loan him her pickup truck (some sources claimed it was a car). Zack drove off on the truck, but he never returned to the bar again.

After stealing the truck, Zack drove to a bar in Niceville, where he befriended a construction company owner named Bobby Chandler. Chandler took pity on Zack after he learned that he was living in the pickup truck and offered to let him stay at his house. However, Zack took advantage of Chandler's kindness, and on June 12, 1996, he stole two guns and $42. He subsequently pawned the guns for $225.

=== Murder of Laurie Russillo ===
On June 13, 1996, 40-year-old Laurie Barbara Russillo (also spelt Laura Rosillo) became the first of two women to be murdered by Michael Zack.

After he went to a bar at Okaloosa Island, Zack first met Russillo and befriended her after she first approached him while he was drinking. He invited Russillo to the beach to use the drugs he had with him. The two left the bar in the truck and drove to the beach, where Zack beat her up in the vehicle. After this, Zack dragged Russillo out of the vehicle and beat her again, and Russillo, who was partially clothed (her tube top was torn and hanging off her hips while her spandex pants were pulled down around her right ankle), was dragged into the dunes, where Zack finished her off by strangling her and additionally kicked sand over her face.

=== Murder of Ravonne Smith ===
Less than 24 hours after he murdered Russillo, Zack befriended and later killed 31-year-old Ravonne Kennedy Smith.

After murdering Russillo, Zack travelled to a bar at Pensacola Beach, where he first met and befriended Smith. Both of them went to the beach to smoke marijuana and after doing so, Smith allowed Zack to go back to the house where she lived together with her boyfriend. After gaining entry into Smith's home, Zack attacked Smith by smashing her head with a bottle, and slammed her head into the floor. Zack subdued Smith to the ground, and he raped her. Thereafter, Zack used an oyster knife to stab the 31-year-old victim four times in her chest.

After stabbing Smith to death, Zack stole the television, VCR and purse from Smith's house, and he tried to pawn the items. However, as the pawn shop suspected that the items were stolen, Zack fled and went into hiding at an empty house in Panama City.

Three days after he killed Smith, Zack was arrested at Panama City, and he subsequently confessed to the two murders to police. Zack was first charged on June 18, 1996, for the murder of Ravonne Smith, before he faced another murder charge for strangling Laurie Russillo.

== Murder trials ==
On September 8, 1997, Michael Zack officially stood trial for the murder of Ravonne Smith before a 12-member jury and a single judge at a Florida state court. Zack faced charges of sexual assault, robbery, and first-degree murder. For the most serious charge of murder, the potential sentence was either a death sentence or life imprisonment without the possibility of parole.

In his trial, Zack claimed that he and Smith had consensual sex and thereafter, Smith made a comment regarding his mother's murder. Reportedly, the comment enraged Zack, and he attacked her. Zack recounted that the fight began in the hallway, not immediately upon entering the house. He also testified that he grabbed a knife in self-defense, under the belief that Smith left the master bedroom to get a gun from the guest bedroom. Other than that, psychiatrists diagnosed that Zack was suffering from both fetal alcohol syndrome (FAS) and post-traumatic stress disorder (PTSD). As a result, the defence suggested that Zack was impulsive, constantly experiencing mental and emotional distress, and therefore incapable of forming the prerequisite intent for premeditated murder. However, the prosecution contended that Zack was both a calculated stalker and predator, as he committed the murders and other crimes by targeting individuals in bars, directing the court and jury's attention to his modus operandi of befriending his victims, earning their sympathy with tales of his mother's death and his abusive childhood, and then exploiting them by either robbing or sexually assaulting them, or killing them in the cases of Smith and Russillo.

After hearing the case for a week, on September 15, 1997, the jury returned with guilty verdicts on all three counts, one of murder, one of firearm robbery and one of rape. On October 17, 1997, by a majority decision of 11 to one, the jury recommended the death penalty for Zack, whose lawyers had earlier pushed for a life sentence by highlighting his abusive childhood and psychiatric conditions. On November 14, 1997, Zack was officially sentenced to death for murdering Ravonne Smith, after Circuit Judge Joseph Tarbuck concurred with the jury's verdict.

On December 6, 1997, more than a month after he was condemned to death row, Zack was put on trial for the second charge of murdering Laurie Russillo. At the beginning of his trial, Zack pleaded guilty to the killing of Russillo, and therefore, Circuit Judge Jere Tolton sentenced Zack to life in prison without the possibility of parole, sparing Zack the possibility of a second death sentence.

== Death row and execution ==
After he was given the death penalty for the murder of Ravonne Smith, Zack appealed all the way to the Florida Supreme Court, which dismissed his final plea on January 6, 2000, therefore finalizing his death sentence. In July 2005, Zack was one of the five death row inmates who appealed to the Florida Supreme Court to vacate their death sentences, but Zack and three of the other four lost their appeals, while the fifth man Donny Crook was re-sentenced to life without parole after the Supreme Court agreed to overturn the death sentence by finding that his mental condition was overlooked by the judge during his sentencing for a 1996 murder case. In October 2005, Zack's second appeal to vacate his death sentence was dismissed. Another appeal from Zack was dismissed in 2017. Amnesty International, an international human rights group, appealed for the Florida state authorities to not execute Zack based on his mental problems and commute his death sentence to life imprisonment.

During his time on death row, Zack met his wife while in prison and he married her; he also took up reading and writing, and made several pen-pals out of people from outside the prison.

On August 17, 2023, Florida Governor Ron DeSantis signed the death warrant of Michael Zack, scheduling him to be executed on October 3, 2023, via lethal injection. Zack's death warrant came two weeks after the execution of serial killer James Phillip Barnes, and Zack was the sixth death row inmate from Florida to have his execution scheduled in the year 2023.

After the announcement of Zack's execution date, his lawyers mounted a final round of appeals, asking the courts to reconsider the decision to put Zack to death on the grounds that fetal alcohol syndrome should exempt him from the death sentence, which was prohibited for offenders with mental or intellectual disability. In response, the prosecution brought up the Marsy's Law, a law pertaining to the victims' rights, to argue that the victims had rights to be free from unreasonable delay and prompt finality in the legal process, and rebutted the defence's arguments about fetal alcohol syndrome, stating that the law of prohibiting executions of mentally-disabled offenders did not apply for fetal alcohol syndrome cases. On September 21, 2023, the Florida Supreme Court rejected the appeal.

Despite this, Zack's lawyers remained undeterred and filed another series of appeals for Zack's execution to be staved off due to fetal alcohol syndrome, and the state continued to urge the courts to have Zack executed. On October 2, 2023, the eve of his execution, the Florida Supreme Court once again rejected Zack's appeal. Amnesty International, an international human rights group, appealed for DeSantis to spare Zack's life and urged that his death sentence should be commuted to life imprisonment based on the tragic childhood and the psychiatric disorders that plagued his life.

On October 3, 2023, 27 years after the North Florida murders, 54-year-old Michael Duane Zack III was formally put to death via lethal injection at Florida State Prison. Zack, who declined a last meal, received a last visit from his wife and spiritual adviser, and when he was asked if he had any last words, Zack faced the witnesses and said

Twenty-seven years ago, I was an alcoholic and a drug addict. I did things that have hurt a lot of people—not only the victims and their families and friends, but my own family and friends as well. I have woken up every single day since then filled with remorse and a wish to make my time here on earth mean something more than the worst thing I ever did. When I got to death row, I substituted drugs and alcohol for happiness and positive relationships. I am so grateful to the guys on the row who took the time to teach me how to read and write. They changed my life forever because their love and support allowed me to have pen pals and friends all over the world. John, Susan, Maria, Anna, and David—I treasure you and the unconditional love you have shared with me all these years. The ability to read and write also led me to my beloved wife and soulmate, Ann-Kristin. I will love her for eternity. I make no excuses. I lay no blame. But how I wish that I could have a second chance, to live out my days in prison and continue to do all I can to make a difference in this world. To all my brothers on death row, please continue to help each other. Give each other hope and peace. Keep sharing the love and acceptance that you all showed a hillbilly from Kentucky. To all the lawyers, counselors, social workers, and volunteers who are working so hard to fix the juvenile justice and child welfare system in this country, I hope my story will inspire you to make a difference in a child's life. You have the power to save another child from my fate. Your work is so important, and I love you. To all the drug and alcohol treatment counselors and family and friends of people who, like me, suffer from addiction, Never give up! I hope you understand how much you are appreciated and loved. Someone like you could have changed my life twenty-seven years ago when I was screaming out for help. To Brother Dale and Susan, God bless you, and thank you for being such a blessing to me. To Linda, Dawn, Stacy, Jessica, Amanda, and Diana, thank you for everything you have done for me all these years. You fought for me until my last breath, and I love you. And finally, to Governor Desantis and the Clemency Board, I love you. I forgive you. I pray for you.

— Michael Duane Zack

He was pronounced dead at 6:14 pm, minutes after the drugs were administered to him. The family of Ravonne Smith, Zack's second victim, were present to witness the execution but they declined to speak to the media, while the family of Zack's first victim Laurie Russillo were absent, and likewise they could not be reached for comment.

== Aftermath ==
After Zack's execution, his final statement was released, and in his statement, Zack expressed remorse for murdering both Ravonne Smith and Laurie Russillo and hurting their friends and families, as well as hurting his own. He stated that he stayed away from both alcohol and drugs by building countless positive relationships in jail, and married his wife while in prison. He added that he made no excuse to absolve himself of his responsibility and hoped that he would have a second chance to live out his life in prison and make a difference in the world, and he forgave the state governor and pardons board for not granting him clemency or a stay of execution. Zack's sisters similarly told the press that they acknowledged the pain and suffering which their brother caused to the victims' families and empathized with their plights, especially since their mother had fallen victim to violence back when Zack was 11.

It was widely speculated that the accelerated pace of executions in Florida during the year of 2023 was politically motivated, since DeSantis had expressed his intention to run for nomination as a presidential candidate and possibly wanted to present himself as a "tough on crime" politician in furtherance of his agenda. Simultaneously, DeSantis had signed two landmark death penalty laws, one of which allows the death penalty for child rape where the victim did not die while another overruled the unanimity requirement for juries to send people to death row (presently in Florida, eight out of 12 jurors was the minimum number allowed to sentence a person to death). The higher rate of state executions in Florida also influenced the execution numbers in the whole of U.S., and statistics showed that there were a total of 24 executions nationwide in 2023, a sharp increase from 18 executions in 2022 the year before and contrary to the death penalty's historical decline across the US.

== See also ==
- Capital punishment in Florida
- List of people executed in Florida
- List of people executed in the United States in 2023

Executions carried out in Florida
Preceded by James Barnes August 3, 2023	Michael Duane Zack III; October 3, 2023	Succeeded by Loran Kenstley Cole August 29, 2024
Executions carried out in the United States
Preceded by Anthony Castillo Sanchez – Oklahoma September 21, 2023	Michael Duane Zack III – Florida; October 3, 2023	Succeeded by Jedidiah Isaac Murphy – Texas October 10, 2023
