= On Death Row =

2012 American television mini-series

- On Death Row title card
- Genre: Television documentary
- Created by: Werner Herzog
- Directed by: Werner Herzog
- Starring: Werner Herzog
- Theme music composer: Mark Degli Antoni
- Countries of origin: United States; United Kingdom; Austria
- Original language: English
- No. of episodes: 8

Production
- Executive producers: Dave Harding; Henry S. Schleiff; Sara Kozak; Andre Singer; Lucki Stipetic; Nick Raslan
- Producer: Erik Nelson
- Cinematography: Peter Zeitlinger
- Running time: 49 minutes
- Production companies: Creative Differences Productions; Spring Films; Werner Herzog Filmproduktion

Original release
- Network: Channel 4
- Release: 9 March 2012 – 24 September 2013

Related
- Into the Abyss

On Death Row is a television mini-series written and directed by Werner Herzog about capital punishment in the United States. The series grew out of the same project which produced Herzog's documentary film Into the Abyss. The series first aired in the United Kingdom on March 22, 2012, on Channel 4.

Each episode of the series focuses on a specific murder case and those convicted of the crimes, each of whom was on death row during filming. The cases profiled are:

- James Barnes, convicted of two murders. Executed by lethal injection in Florida on August 3, 2023.
- Joseph Garcia and George Rivas, members of the Texas Seven. Rivas, the leader of the Texas Seven, was executed on February 29, 2012, aged 41. Garcia was executed on December 4, 2018.
- Hank Skinner, convicted of murdering a woman and her two sons. Skinner died at Hospital Galveston in Galveston, Texas, on February 16, 2023. He was 60. His attorneys said he died due to complications following surgery in December 2022 to remove a brain tumor.
- Linda Carty, convicted of murdering a woman and stealing her four-day-old child.
- Robert Fratta, convicted for hiring two men to murder his wife. Executed by lethal injection in Texas on January 10, 2023.
- Darlie Routier, convicted of murdering her five-year-old son, Damon. Two of her sons, Damon and 6-year-old Devon, were killed in the attack, but she was only tried for the murder of Damon.
- Blaine Milam, convicted of killing his girlfriend's 13-month-old daughter. Executed by lethal injection in Texas on September 25, 2025. Milam previously received two prior execution dates for January 15, 2019, and January 21, 2021; however, both were stayed.
- Douglas Feldman, convicted of shooting two truck drivers in a traffic altercation. Executed by lethal injection in Texas on July 31, 2013.

== Production and release ==
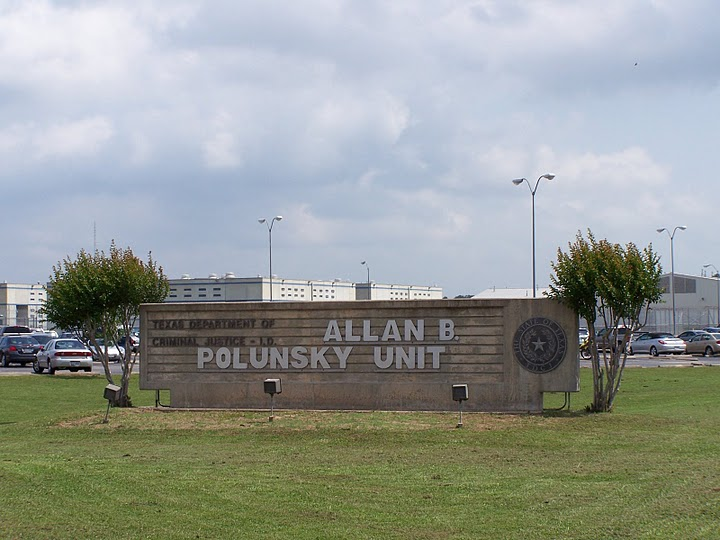
Three of the series' episodes filmed interviews at the Allan B. Polunsky Unit, which houses Texas' death row inmates.

One of the originally planned episodes of the series was expanded to feature length and released theatrically as Into the Abyss in November 2011. Both the film and the series used the same production crew.

Herzog's visits with the inmates were very constrained, and he was typically granted only two hours for filming with each inmate. In an introduction to the broadcast of the first episode, it was stated that Herzog only was allowed two sessions of one hour each with his first subject, James Barnes.

The series showed at the 62nd Berlin International Film Festival (Berlinale Special) on February 29, 2012, a month before its television premiere.

When the series aired on Investigation Discovery brief introductions by Paula Zahn were inserted after each commercial break. These "bumpers" were poorly received in reviews.

== Synopsis ==
Each episode of the series profiles a particular death row inmate, beginning with Herzog's statement:

The death penalty exists in 34 states of the United States of America. Currently, only 16 states actually perform executions. Executions are carried out by lethal injection. As a German, coming from a different historical background and being a guest in the United States, I respectfully disagree with the practice of capital punishment.

Since the series was produced in 2012 some regulations have changed. As of 2017, the death penalty is legal in 31 states. Lethal injection is the primary method of execution, but some states allow other methods. Several states allow death row inmates to choose their method of execution from a list of approved methods.

Most of the episode's runtime consists of the interview subject speaking to Herzog, who never appears on screen. Each episode also features brief interviews with other people related to the cases, including prosecutors, defense lawyers, and family members.

=== James Barnes ===
The first episode features James Barnes, who was in prison in Florida. In 1998, he was given a life sentence for murdering his estranged wife. Seven years into this sentence, he converted to Islam and became a practicing Muslim. During one period of Ramadan, he felt compelled to confess to the murder of Patricia Miller, for which he was then given the death sentence. Barnes strongly implies that further victims exist, but that he would not choose "this platform" (the justice system) to confess again, since the first voluntary confession had landed him on death row - a situation that he seems to consider unexpected and unfair. Herzog begins his conversation by saying, "sympathizing with your quest for procedural justice, does not mean that I have to like you." Barnes is friendly and very responsive throughout the conversation. Herzog's questions focus on Barnes' state of mind as a man who knows when he will die. Herzog asks what he dreams of when he sleeps, what he misses the most from the outside world, and what he will request for his last meal.

Herzog also interviews Tod Goodyear, a detective in Barnes' case, who describes the details of Barnes' crimes. Most of the description of the crimes comes from Goodyear and Herzog's voiceover, rather than from Barnes himself. Herzog also meets with George Burden, the post-conviction attorney for Barnes. Burden discusses his devotion to the due process of law and his reasons for defending Barnes, whose guilt he does not doubt. Burden does not explicitly state an opposition to the death penalty, but says that "retribution" is the only purpose it can serve. He and Herzog both dismiss immediately the suggestion that it acts as a deterrent of serious crimes. Herzog says that it is "Biblical and it is Old Testament, but it is not what Jesus would try to tell us."

Barnes' twin sister Jeannice Barnes, who lives in Georgia, is also interviewed at length. She talks about his long criminal history, and the physical and sexual abuse that James suffered in their home. Herzog asks if Jeannice will visit Barnes before his execution, she responds that she would like to, but that she cannot because there is a warrant for her arrest in Florida. On the evening before Herzog's second meeting with Barnes, he found and interviewed Barnes' estranged father. His father declined to be filmed but asked for Herzog to relay a message, "One: I love him, Two: I hate the crimes he committed."

Six weeks after their first meeting, Barnes sent Herzog a letter confessing to two additional murders. Barnes confessed to the murders of Chester Wetmore and Brenda Fletcher, both of which were unsolved cases at the time of filming. Herzog was wary of being used as a tool to delay Barnes' execution, but the episode includes a detailed filmed confession of these two additional murders.

The episode ends Herzog and Burden's thoughts on capital punishment, and Barnes' description of things he wishes he had. He wishes for complete freedom, and a desire to jump into the ocean on a hot day, washing away all the dirtiness that he feels.

=== Linda Carty ===
Linda Carty is one of only 9 women on death row in Texas, convicted of murdering 25 year Joana Rodrigues and stealing her 4 day old child. The episode begins with Carty singing Amazing Grace while Herzog describes the crime. The young mother was found dead in the trunk of a car, with the infant child barely alive in a nearby car. Carty's first statement in the episode is a declaration of her innocence.

Herzog interviews Assistant District Attorney Connie Spence, who prosecuted Carty. Spence relates that Carty had desperately wanted a child, and knew that Rodrigues had been pregnant. Carty enlisted three local drug dealers to break into the victim's apartment, telling them that there was a stash of marijuana inside. Spence relates that Carty was unaware that the baby had already been born, and she quotes Carty as saying "you can take the drugs, but I'll cut the baby out of the bitch."

Herzog then interviews Chris Robinson, one of the three men who broke into the apartment, still in prison for the crime. Robinson says that he had been fooled by Carty, and would never have gone along with their plan if he had known the baby would be taken. After the breakin, Robinson and the others were surprised to find that Carty had killed the baby's mother. They claim that they saved the baby's life by turning on the air conditioning in the car where the baby was found the next day.

The film then shows video footage of Carty's interrogation immediately after her arrest, where she repeatedly denies any involvement. Carty then tells Herzog that she had been recruited as an informant by the DEA, and was gathering intelligence on local drug dealers, who framed her for these crimes. Herzog then interviews Jovelle Joubert, Carty's adult daughter. Joubert describes her feelings about visiting her mother, who she says was "in the wrong place at the wrong time". Joubert also reiterates Carty's story that she had been framed by drug dealers in retaliation for her involvement with the DEA.

Herzog next interviews Michael Goldberg of Baker Botts LLP, Carty's Appellate Counsel, who is trying to arrange a retrial. Goldberg describes some fundamental errors in Carty's original defense: Carty's lawyer failed to interview Carty's DEA handler, who believes that Carty is not dangerous and could not have committed these crimes. Goldberg states that the British government also should have been notified immediately about Carty's trial, and that she would have been given more competent representation. Goldberg does not assert Carty's innocence, but believes that she would never have been given the death penalty if she was given a proper defense.

Herzog shows footage from the mother's funeral in Mexico. Her husband and son decided not to return to the United States. The episode concludes with a long statement from Spence about the dangers of "humanizing" Carty. Herzog replies: "I do not make an attempt to humanize her. She is simply a human being, period." Joubert discusses her anticipation of her mother's execution, which has not been scheduled.

=== Hank Skinner ===
Hank Skinner was convicted of a triple homicide in 1993 and vehemently denies his guilt. Herzog begins his interview with two statements: "One: I am not an advocate of capital punishment. Second: ... what we are doing here is not an instrument for proving your innocence." Skinner gives a description of the events leading up to his scheduled execution in 2010, which was stayed only minutes before it was to occur. He ate a large last meal and was given the last rites by a priest. He discusses his feelings approaching the execution, and his perception of time on death row.

Skinner also describes the procedure for transporting inmates from the Polunsky unit to the execution, which occurs 40 miles (64 km) away at the Huntsville Unit. The inmate is locked in a cage in an armored van, and told that he will be shot immediately if anyone attempts to free him. Herzog asks if the guards shout "dead man walking" when he is being transported, and Skinner says that they do not.

Herzog then explores the crimes for which Skinner was convicted, interviewing David Bowser, a local news reporter who covered the case. Bowser tells how Skinner had a fight with his girlfriend Twila Busby at her home, after which she and her two adult sons were found dead. Busby had been beaten to death, and the sons were stabbed. Skinner was found at the home of a former girlfriend, who was trying to stitch a cut on his hand. Herzog and Bowser drive to the scene of the crime, where Busby's home still stands. Herzog asks if the people of Pampa Texas, where the crimes were committed, would feel good and celebrate when Skinner was executed. Bowser replies that they would feel justice has been done.

Five months after his first interview, Herzog met with Skinner again. Skinner had recently won a major victory from the U.S. Supreme Court, ruling that he had the right to sue the district attorney to produce evidence which was not presented at his trial. Skinner describes his victory, peppered with superstitious "significant portents", drawing connections to the persecution of the Templars, and the Epic of Gilgamesh. Skinner then describes the evidence he hopes to obtain: the kitchen knives that were used to kill the two men. Skinner's DNA was found on the knives, but he had used the knives daily. Skinner also hopes to test a bloody jacket found at the scene, which he denies he ever wore. Skinner suspects Busby's uncle of the crimes and hopes to find his DNA on these items.

Herzog then asks Skinner about his dreams and desires. Skinner says "I would kill somebody for an avocado right now", immediately clarifying that he is joking. He describes his dreams of his eventual release, about his reunion with his daughter and with his wife, whom he married after his conviction.

Skinner discusses his experience watching his death row cellmate and close friend being taken away to be executed. He describes the sight of law enforcement officers taking a man away to be killed as a "Twilight Zone moment". Skinner concludes with a description of the overwhelming car trip from Polunsky to Huntsville, comparing it to Israel. Herzog shows scenes from the drive, and describes them: "the landscape bleak and forlorn, and yet everything out there all of a sudden looked magnificent, as if entering the holy land. Hank Skinner's holy land."

== Episodes ==
=== Season 1 (2012) ===
No. overall	No. in season	Title	Original release date
1	1	"Conversation with James Barnes"	March 9, 2012
A conversation with James Barnes, convicted of murdering a nurse in 1988 in Melbourne, Florida.
2	2	"Conversation with Linda Carty"	March 16, 2012
A conversation with Linda Carty, convicted of murdering a woman and stealing her four day-old child.
3	3	"Conversation with Joseph Garcia and George Rivas"	March 23, 2012
A conversation with members of the Texas Seven, including Joseph Garcia and George Rivas.
4	4	"Conversation with Hank Skinner"	March 30, 2012
A conversation with Hank Skinner. Sentenced to death for a triple-homicide.

=== Season 2 (2013) ===
No. overall	No. in season	Title	Original release date
5	1	"Portrait: Robert Fratta"	September 3, 2013
Portrait of Robert Fratta from Missouri City, Texas, who was convicted for hiring two men to murder his wife Farah and was sentenced to death.
6	2	"Portrait: Darlie Routier"	September 10, 2013
Portrait of Darlie Routier, convicted of murdering her five-year-old son, Damon. Two of her sons, Damon and 6-year-old Devon, were killed in the attack, but she was only tried for the murder of Damon.
7	3	"Portrait: Blaine Milam"	September 17, 2013
Portrait of Blaine Milam, convicted of killing his girlfriend's 13-month-old daughter.
8	4	"Portrait: Douglas Feldman"	September 24, 2013
Portrait of Douglas Feldman, convicted of shooting two truck drivers in a traffic altercation in Plano, Texas.
