= Linda Carty =

British-American murderer on death row

- Born: Linda Anita Carty; 5 October 1958 (age 68); St. Kitts, Saint Christopher-Nevis-Anguilla (present-day, Saint Kitts and Nevis)
- Occupations: Laborer, former primary school teacher, former drug informant
- Spouse: Jose Corona
- Status: Incarcerated at Patrick O'Daniel Unit in Gatesville, Texas
- Conviction: Capital murder
- Penalty: Death (February 21, 2002)

Linda Anita Carty (born 5 October 1958) is a Kittitian-American (Note: Saint Kitts and Nevis was still a British colony in 1958, giving her British citizenship.) former schoolteacher who is on death row in Texas, United States. In February 2002, she was sentenced to death for the abduction and murder in 2001 of 25-year-old Joana Rodriguez in order to steal Rodriguez's newborn son. Carty claimed she was framed by her co-defendants who were drug dealers because she had previously been an informant.

Carty has appealed her conviction, with her most recent petition to the United States Supreme Court for a writ of certiorari being denied by the Supreme Court on November 13, 2018.

== Early life and education ==
Carty was born on the island of St. Kitts, Saint Christopher-Nevis-Anguilla (present-day, Saint Kitts and Nevis) to Anguillan parents, Carty holds British citizenship as St. Kitts was a British colony at the time of her birth. She emigrated to the United States in 1982. Carty studied pharmacology at the University of Houston.

== Drug informant ==
In 1992, Carty was convicted of auto theft and impersonation of an FBI agent. She was sentenced to 10 years probation, on the condition she would work as a drug informant. While working as an informant, she provided information leading to two arrests. Her services ended when she was arrested on drug charges.

In media interviews, Carty has claimed that she was recruited by a friend from the Houston Police Department and that her work for the Drug Enforcement Administration (DEA) helped land seizures of thousands of dollars' worth of narcotics and led to the imprisonment of scores of dealers.

== The crime ==
According to the Texas Department of Criminal Justice:

On May 16, 2001, Carty and three co-defendants invaded a home and kidnapped a 25-year-old female and her newborn son. The victim subsequently died of suffocation, but the baby was found unharmed.

== Investigation ==
Investigators initially suspected Carty after discovering that she had told people she was going to have a baby despite not appearing pregnant. While interviewing neighbors in the apartment complex, police heard from one neighbor that she sat with Carty in a car, saw a child's car seat in the car, and was told by Carty that she was pregnant, although the witness thought Carty did not appear to be pregnant. Police then telephoned Carty and asked her to meet with them. She told them that a car she had rented and her daughter's car might have been used in the crime. She was placed under arrest. Then she directed them to a location where both cars were found: the live baby was in one, and the suffocated victim was in the back of the other. Carty's fingerprints were in both cars. They found various items of baby paraphernalia.

== Trial ==
The following evidence was presented during the trial:

- In early May 2001, Carty and her husband separated. Carty then informed him that she was pregnant with his child.
- On the day before the murder, 15 May 2001, Carty told her neighbor, Florence Meyers, that she was pregnant and that the baby would be born the next day. Meyers testified that Carty did not appear to be pregnant.
- Carty told her husband on 15 May that she would have a baby boy the next day. When he met her at the police station on 16 May after she had been arrested, he asked her if the baby had been born, and she told him "not yet."
- On 15 May, Carty told Sherry Bancroft, an employee at Public Storage, that she had indeed had the baby and that he was at home with his father.
- The victim's husband testified that while the intruders were in his home, one of them answered his cell phone and said, "We are inside here. Do you want it?" Then he yelled that "she" was outside and that they had to go. The intruders left, taking the baby with them.
- Carty's cell phone records were introduced and showed 11 calls logged between 12:50 a.m. and 2:50 a.m. on 16 May 2001 between Carty's phone and the cell phone number that led police to Gerald Anderson. Seven of those calls were placed between 1:09 a.m. and 1:14 a.m.
- Sarah Hernandez testified that she met Carty while they were both serving time in jail. Carty asked Hernandez to write a letter for her because she did not want the letter to be in her own handwriting. Carty wrote out what she wanted the letter to say, and Hernandez copied it. Hernandez said the letter was supposed to be from someone named Oscar. The letter said Carty was being set up by "Chris and Zeb," who borrowed Carty's car and put the baby in it. The letter stated they had a grudge against Carty.
- Carty's mother testified that her daughter did not mention that she was pregnant when they talked on 13 May or the following days, and Carty did not appear to be pregnant around that time.

== Conviction and appeals ==
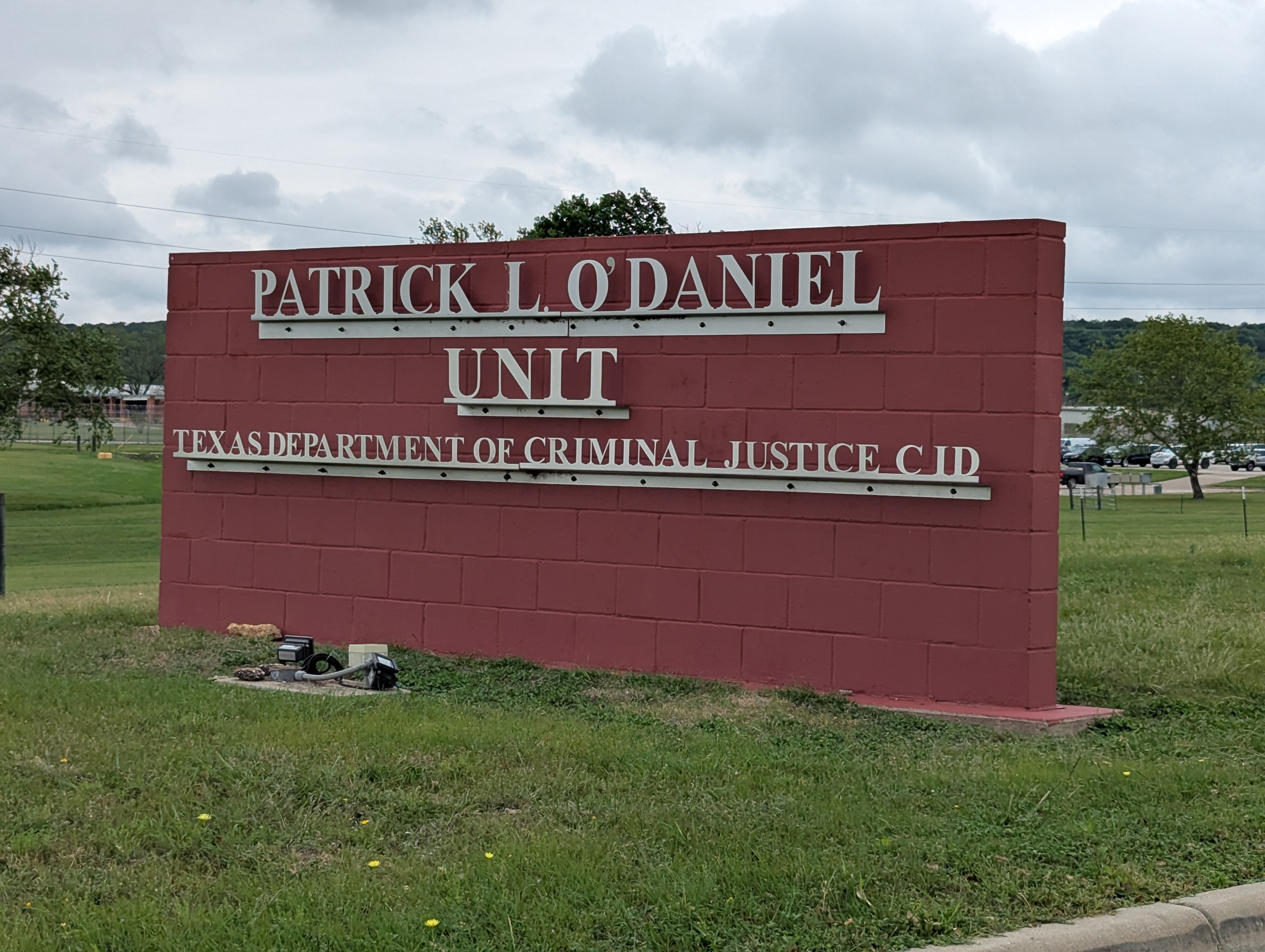
Patrick O'Daniel Unit, where Carty is held

Carty was convicted of murder on February 19, 2002. On February 21, she was sentenced to death by lethal injection.

The imposition of a death sentence in Texas results in an automatic direct appeal to the Texas Court of Criminal Appeals. This appeal was rejected on April 7, 2004. Carty appealed to the Fifth Circuit Court of Appeals. This appeal was rejected on September 19, 2009. On 26 February 2010, Carty appealed to the U.S. Supreme Court, in which the British government filed an amicus curiae brief. However, on May 3, 2010, the Court refused to review the case, denying certiorari. The Texas Board of Pardons and Paroles has the option to recommend clemency to the Governor of Texas. However, such recommendations are rare.

In 2018, she petitioned the Supreme Court again, arguing that the Texas Court of Criminal Appeals "refused to consider the cumulative prejudice" of constitutional errors in her case, including ineffective assistance of counsel and the State intentionally withholding "numerous items" of exculpatory evidence; however, the Court denied certiorari. The British government filed an amicus brief in her support.

== Defense claims ==
Carty, her lawyers, and her supporters contend that she has been unjustly sentenced to death for a murder she did not commit. Reprieve claims that her defense attorney did not present mitigating evidence. They assert that no scientific evidence exists that establishes that she was at the scene of the crime, although her fingerprints were found in the car containing the victim's body. Carty has claimed that she was framed by three men for her work as an informant with the Drug Enforcement Administration. Carty stated that "it was too difficult just to kill me, so they hatched this plot." Anderson, Robinson, and Williams, the other co-defendants in the kidnapping and murder, were given prison terms, but none received the death penalty after testifying against Carty. Baker Botts, the law firm handling Carty's appeal, have argued that her trial attorney, Jerry Guerinot, handled her defense in an incompetent manner. Michael Goldberg of Baker Botts accuses Guerinot, who never won a death penalty case over his entire career, of failing to call any witnesses who might have persuaded the jury that she did not deserve execution. In addition, they assert that Guerinot met with Carty for only a single 15 minute interview. Guerinot's co-counsel has disputed this. Carty also claims that she was interviewed without counsel being present on one occasion.

== US breach of international law ==
Under the terms of the Bilateral Convention on Consular Officers (1951) between the United States and the United Kingdom, the United Kingdom's consular officials were entitled to be informed immediately upon her detention (art. 16(1) of the convention). The authorities in Texas failed to inform the British Consulate until after Carty's conviction and sentencing. In an interview for a documentary broadcast by the UK's Channel 4, The British Woman on Death Row (November 28, 2011), the United Kingdom's Consul General in Houston at the time, Paul Lynch, stated that this breach:

made a material difference to the outcome of this case. If we had been allowed, and given the opportunity to support Linda Carty, if she had been given all the support to which she was entitled and which she deserved ... something entirely different, I believe, would have happened at that trial and Linda Carty would not now be facing a death penalty.

The United Kingdom contends in its amicus curiae brief in the US Supreme Court that it regards the US as having breached its obligations under international law. However, the United Kingdom lacks any legal forum to obtain redress for this breach.

== Additional information ==
Carty's case received media attention in September 2009 when her image was placed on the fourth plinth in Trafalgar Square by her British supporters.

Carty is presently being held on death row at the Mountain View Unit of the Texas Department of Criminal Justice.

In 2012, she appeared on a segment of Werner Herzog's series On Death Row, broadcast on the Discovery Channel program Investigation Discovery. In November 2013, Carty's story was profiled on Investigation Discovery's documentary series Deadly Women, in an episode titled "Untamed Evil."

On June 19, 2016, Sky Network aired a one-hour program about her case on CBS Reality. The program is called The British Woman on Death Row. On March 22, 2022, ITV broadcast British Grandma on Death Row with Susanna Reid, in which Carty continued to profess her innocence.

== See also ==
- Capital punishment
- Capital punishment in Texas
- LaGrand case
- Mexico v. United States
- List of women on death row in the United States
