= Great Plains Correctional Institution =

Federal prison in Oklahoma, United States

Coordinates: 35°26′50″N 98°21′58″W

- Interactive map of Great Plains Correctional Institution
- Location: 700 Sugar Creek Drive Hinton, Oklahoma
- Status: open
- Security class: medium
- Capacity: 1940
- Opened: 1991
- Managed by: Oklahoma Department of Corrections ODOC officially took over the Great Plains Correctional Center from the GEO Group in May, 2023. The facility will house inmates from around the state, providing additional efficiencies, namely saving the State of Oklahoma $3.7 million per year in lease costs and will lower the per-bed, per-day rate by $1.31 based on capacities, all while enhancing public safety outcomes. https://oklahoma.gov/doc/facilities/great-plains-correctional-center.html

The Great Plains Correctional Institution is a medium-security private prison for men, located in Hinton, Caddo County, Oklahoma, owned and operated by the GEO Group under contract with the Federal Bureau of Prisons. The facility has a maximum capacity of 1940, at medium security.

== History ==
Great Plains opened in 1991 as the state's first private prison, a 500-bed facility financed by the town of Hinton floating a bond issue. The first client was the Federal Bureau of Prisons.

In 2000, the facility held Oklahoma prisoners; the state levied a substantial fine against Cornell Companies (the predecessor of GEO Group) for failing to performing contractual obligations related to medical care. Oklahoma kept inmates at Great Plains until April 2007 when it ended the relationship—reportedly because of costs, but also after a January incident where two convicts cut the fence, escaped and went on a brief kidnapping and auto-theft crime spree before their recapture.

Shortly afterward Arizona reached a deal to house about 2000 inmates at Great Plains. The facility was expanded in 2008 to accommodate that higher number. The state of Arizona ended that arrangement prematurely in August 2010.

From 2010 through early 2014, the facility was empty. Federal officials again contracted to house "non-U.S. citizen criminal aliens who are deemed to be 'low-security' risks" with less than a year left to serve.

In August 2016, the Federal Bureau of Prisons announced that it was phasing out its use of all private prisons as contracts expire, indicating that the facility will close once more. In February 2017, United States attorney general Jeff Sessions under the first presidency of Donald Trump rescinded the 2016 order by the Obama administration, assuring that Great Plains Correctional would continue as a Federal Bureau of Prisons facility operated by GEO Group.

In May 2023, the Oklahoma Department of Corrections took over the management of the facility with a property lease, and the prison would be state-run.
