= Michael Dewayne Smith =

Convicted double killer and gang member executed in Oklahoma in 2024

- 2021 mugshot of Michael Dewayne Smith
- Born: June 24, 1982; Oklahoma, U.S.
- Died: April 4, 2024 (aged 41); Oklahoma State Penitentiary, McAlester, Oklahoma, U.S.
- Cause of death: Execution by lethal injection
- Other name: The Hoover Killer
- Allegiance: Oak Grove Posse gang
- Convictions: First-degree murder (x2); Second-degree murder Firearm robbery Arson; Burglary
- Penalty: Death (x2; first-degree murder, October 14, 2003); Life imprisonment (second-degree murder, March 4, 2004); 85 years' imprisonment and a $45,000 fine (robbery, burglary, arson)

Details
- Victims: Otis Payne Jr., 26; Janet Miller Moore, 41; Sarath Pulluru, 22
- Date: November 24, 2001 – February 22, 2002
- Location: Oklahoma City
- Imprisoned at: Oklahoma State Penitentiary

Michael Dewayne Smith (June 24, 1982 – April 4, 2024), also known as the Hoover Killer, was an American serial killer who was sentenced to death for the murders of two people at different locations in Oklahoma City on February 22, 2002. Smith, who was part of the Oak Grove Posse gang, was suspected to have murdered another man in 2001 and was on the run when he committed the double shootings in 2002, first killing Janet Moore, a 41-year-old mother, at her house before he murdered 22-year-old Sarath Pulluru (also spelt Sharath Pulluru), a student and store clerk from India. Smith was arrested for the double murder, for which he was convicted and sentenced to death in 2003. Smith was incarcerated on death row for 21 years before he was ultimately executed on April 4, 2024, despite his protestations of innocence.

== Early life ==
Michael Dewayne Smith was born in Oklahoma, U.S., on June 24, 1982.

According to court sources, Smith reportedly grew up in a crime-infested neighbourhood where gang violence and drug activities were rampant. Smith's father was said to be an alcoholic who was abusive towards his mother and by the age of two, Smith's parents separated and Smith, due to his dysfunctional upbringing, began to abuse drugs and introduced to gangs at a young age due to the influence of his brothers. Smith also did not perform well in school, and at one point during his childhood, Smith was sexually abused by an older woman when he was seven or eight years old.

By 2000, Smith was already a member of the Oak Grove Posse, a local street gang active in Oklahoma City. By 2002, Smith was already on the wanted list for five felony cases, namely shooting with intent to kill, assault and battery with a dangerous weapon, assault and battery on a police officer, attempting to elude police, drunken driving and driving with a revoked driver's license.

== Murder of Otis Payne Jr. (2001) ==
On November 24, 2001, outside a nightclub in northeast Oklahoma City, 19-year-old Michael Smith and another man would shoot and kill a 26-year-old man.

On that day itself, Smith and his 29-year-old accomplice David Walter Burns were together with two men – 31-year-old Meldon Moore and 26-year-old Otis Payne Jr. – inside a sport utility vehicle outside the nightclub. Both Smith and Burns, the latter who was handed the weapon from Smith, discharged their guns at both Moore and Payne after an altercation reportedly broke out inside the car among the men. Although the fatal shot was meant for Moore, it hit Payne instead and resulted in the death of Payne, while Moore survived with a gunshot wound to his shoulder.

Both Smith and Burns fled the car after the shootings, and the police would identify them and place them on the wanted list in connection to the murder of Payne.

== Murders of Sarath Pulluru and Janet Moore (2002) ==
While Michael Smith remained on the run for the murder of Otis Payne Jr., he would commit another two murders, also in Oklahoma City, on February 22, 2002.

=== Janet Moore ===
On that day itself, at around 6.30am, Smith planned to settle scores with a man named Phillip Zachary Jr., whom he believed to be a police informant who gave up information about his whereabouts, and he arrived at an apartment of Zachary's mother, 41-year-old Janet Miller Moore, looking for Zachary.

Although Zachary was not present at home, his mother was alone in the apartment and was dressing up to go to work at an insurance division of a nearby hospital. Smith reportedly barged into the home by allegedly kicking down the front door of Moore's apartment, shocking Moore, who screamed as a result. Smith, who failed to find Zachary in the apartment, confronted Moore and fired his gun at Moore, killing her on the spot.

After shooting Moore to death, Smith cleaned up the house to remove any of his fingerprint traces to destroy evidence.

=== Sarath Pulluru ===
Shortly after murdering Moore, Smith went on to target another person, this time a convenience store clerk whom Smith believed to have made disrespectful comments about a deceased member of his gang.

At around 7.30pm, an hour after the killing of Moore, 22-year-old convenience store clerk Sarath "Babu" Pulluru, who was born and raised in Andhra Pradesh, India before he emigrated to the U.S. to study, was on his work shift at a 24/7 provision store in Oklahoma City, when Smith entered the store, holding him at gunpoint. According to Smith's confession, he discharged and emptied two guns worth of ammunition on Pulluru despite his questions of what he did to warrant the shooting. After the shooting, Smith poured lighter fluid onto the body of Pulluru and both the cash register and back room of the store, and started a fire to burn down the store and destroy evidence.

Prior to this, in separate case, Smith's three fellow gang members – Teron “T-Nok” Armstrong, Kenneth “Peanut” Kinchion, and Dewayne “Pudgy-O” Shirley – went to rob a convenience store on the south side of Oklahoma City, but the robbery ended with the store owner, a Vietnamese man named Han Van Ho, shooting and killing one of the gang members, Armstrong, in self-defence. Reportedly, Smith, who was not involved in the robbery, was angered to read from a newspaper that an employee from that store made disrespectful remarks about his gang and thus killed Pulluru, whom he believed to be the same employee that made these disrespectful comments. However, it was a case of mistaken identity as Pulluru was not the employee quoted in the article, and the store where the robbery happened was a neighbouring shop of Pulluru's workplace.

In the immediate aftermath of Armstrong's death, both Kinchion and Shirley were later charged for the death of Armstrong and two robberies, and consequently sentenced to life in prison, while Han Van Ho's actions of fatally shooting Armstrong was found to be justified and he did not face charges. The murder of Pulluru, as well as Moore, happened just two days before the trials of both Shirley and Kinchion.

== Murder trials and sentencing ==
=== Arrest and indictment ===
On February 24, 2002, two days after the murders of Janet Moore and Sarath Pulluru, Michael Smith was arrested for the slaying of Otis Payne, although his involvement in the double murder was not yet revealed until much later during the investigations into Payne's death, when Smith was questioned for the double murder, to which he originally denied before he finally confessed.

In March 2002, Smith was charged with first-degree murder for murdering Payne, Moore and Pulluru. He also faced numerous lesser charges of burglary, firearm robbery, arson and other offences.

=== Trial for murders of Pulluru and Moore ===
Smith first stood trial for the murders of Moore and Pulluru. Originally, his trial took place before an Oklahoma County jury on June 6, 2003, but procedural errors led to the judge declaring it a mistrial and eventually, a second jury trial began on August 28, 2003. For the most serious charge of first-degree murder, Smith potentially faced either the death penalty or life imprisonment.

During the trial itself, 20-year-old Sheena Johnson, a female acquaintance of Smith, testified that Smith had confessed to her about killing both Moore and Pulluru. Smith reportedly told Johnson that he was looking for Moore's son when he encountered Moore and therefore shot her. She said that when Smith found out the identity of the woman he murdered, he merely shrugged and nonchalantly said, "Oh well." An autopsy report showed that Moore was shot once in the left chest and Pulluru sustained at least nine gunshot wounds to his four limbs, chest and face.

Although Smith had denied committing the murders and said he confessed under the lingering influence of drugs, a videotape that recorded the confession of Smith during his police interrogation was played in court before the jury and judge. In the videotape, Smith, who initially denied his involvement in the double murder, eventually broke down and confessed to both Oklahoma City police detectives Janet McNutt and Teresa Sterling that he shot Moore because she panicked and he would not have shot her if she had calmed down, and he shot Pulluru to avenge the late Teron Armstrong, who was killed by the neighbouring store's owner and believed Pulluru had insulted Armstrong.

On September 11, 2003, the jury found Smith guilty of both counts of murder, as well as one count each of robbery by firearm, burglary and arson.

On September 20, 2003, the jury of nine women and three men recommended the death penalty for each count of murder in Smith's case, as well as 85 years' imprisonment for the other lesser charges. A formal sentencing trial was scheduled to take place on October 14, 2003.

On October 14, 2003, Smith was officially sentenced to death for both counts of murder by Oklahoma County District Judge Twyla Mason Gray. Apart from the two death sentences, Smith was also handed an 85-year jail term for the robbery, burglary and arson charges. Justice Gray stated that the victims were hardworking individuals who did not deserved to be murdered and it was clear-cut that the death penalty was appropriate for Smith in light of the brutal killings, and Moore's son Phillip Zachary commented that justice was served for his mother.

=== Trial for Payne's murder ===
After he was condemned to death row, Smith returned to court in March 2004 to face a second murder trial for murdering Otis Payne Jr. back in November 2001. After five days of trial, Smith was found guilty of second-degree murder before a jury at the Oklahoma County District Court, and sentenced to life imprisonment. Additionally, the judge ordered the life sentence, which carried the possibility of parole, to run consecutively with the two death sentences Smith received for the double murder of Pulluru and Moore.

As for David Burns, Smith's accomplice in this case, he was arrested on an unknown date prior to August 2002. Burns was sentenced to 25 years in prison for second-degree murder and five years for firearm possession in March 2004.

== Death row and execution ==
=== Appeals and death warrants ===
After he was sentenced to death in 2003, Michael Smith spent 21 years on death row for murdering both Sarath Pulluru and Janet Moore. His appeals in 2007 and 2016 were dismissed, including claims of ineffective legal counsel and his claims of innocence. Smith had argued in his appeals that his confession should not be admitted as evidence as he did not voluntarily confess to the murders and was under the influence of drugs during his police interrogation.

By March 2017, Smith had exhausted all avenues of appeal in his case, and he became eligible for execution on a date to be decided. As of February 2020, Smith was one of 26 death row inmates in Oklahoma awaiting execution after they became eligible for execution and completed all appeal processes.

Smith was one of the 28 death row inmates in Oklahoma to file a lawsuit against the state over Oklahoma's execution protocols, and the lawsuit was dismissed in June 2022 after the courts ruled that there was no breach of constitutionality in the death penalty laws of Oklahoma, paving the way for Smith and the other plaintiffs to be executed on later dates to be decided.

In August 2022, the Oklahoma Court of Criminal Appeals released the death warrants for a total of 25 condemned inmates held on the state's death row. Smith was one of the death row prisoners on the list, and his execution date was scheduled on July 6, 2023. In January 2023, the Oklahoma Court of Criminal Appeals issued a court order, rescheduling the execution dates of Smith and five other death row prisoners (including Phillip Dean Hancock and Richard Glossip). Tentatively, Smith was slated to be executed on April 4, 2024.

=== Clemency hearing and execution ===
On March 6, 2024, a month before Smith was slated to be executed, the Oklahoma Pardon and Parole Board conducted a clemency hearing for Smith. During the hearing itself, despite his claims of feeling sorrowful for the victims, Smith maintained his innocence, stating that he did not recall shooting both Moore and Pulluru, as he was high on drugs and his confession was not made voluntarily. Mark Henricksen, Smith's lawyer, also pushed for mercy on behalf of his client on the grounds of intellectual disability, which was disputed by prosecutors, who opposed the clemency plea and argued that Smith remained a lingering menace to society, as he was said to have remained in contact with gang members behind bars and he was previously caught with weapons on death row as recently as 2019. In the end, by a vote of 4–1, the parole board decided to not grant Smith clemency. The families of Moore and Pulluru had earlier asked the parole board to not allow clemency for Smith, and the Oklahoma Attorney General similarly expressed to the parole board that he opposed clemency for Smith.

After losing his plea for clemency, Smith filed a last-minute appeal to stave off his execution and seek a fresh review of his case, but the Oklahoma Court of Criminal Appeals rejected his appeal. On the morning of April 4, 2024, hours before he was scheduled to be executed, Smith further appealed to the U.S. Supreme Court for the final time, seeking a stay of execution on the grounds that his confession was not sufficiently corroborated, but the appeal was denied and the Supreme Court permitted the execution to move forward.

Subsequently, 41-year-old Michael Dewayne Smith was officially put to death via lethal injection at Oklahoma State Penitentiary, and was pronounced dead at 10:20 AM, after the drugs were administered to him. Both Moore's son Phillip Zachary Jr. and niece Morgan Miller-Perkins reportedly attended the execution of Smith. He reportedly declined a last meal, and when asked if he had a final statement, he replied, "Nah, I'm good."

=== Aftermath ===
After the execution of Smith, the families of Moore and Pulluru expressed their support for the execution of Smith. Moore's family released a statement, stating that justice has been served and they thanked all the authorities for pursuing the punishment for Smith over the past 22 years. Pulluru's brother Harish, who worked as a doctor in Nebraska, stated on his family's behalf that the violent death of his brother, who was the life of their family, had shattered the lives of his family members and Pulluru lived in the hearts of their kin forever, and the family was thankful that justice was finally served. Despite the families' support for Smith's death sentence, opponents of capital punishment panned the execution of Smith, whom they described as a "troubled and vulnerable young man with intellectual disabilities".

Oklahoma Attorney General Gentner Drummond make his official statement during a media conference after Smith's execution. He stated that justice had been served for both Moore and Pulluru, stating that Moore herself was "a rock for her family" while Pulluru himself "was an inspiration to his family" as the first member of his family to travel from India to the U.S. for education. Drummond also added that the deaths of Moore and Pulluru happened due to them being at the wrong place at the wrong time and therefore fell victim to Smith's murderous rampage, and it ended with Smith being brought to justice for his wrongdoings.

Smith was the first person to be executed in Oklahoma during the year 2024, as well as the fourth person to be executed in the U.S. on that same year. Smith was also the 12th person to be executed in Oklahoma after the state's resumption of executions in 2021, ending a six-year moratorium on the state's use of capital punishment due to high-profile cases of botched executions.

== See also ==
- Capital punishment in Oklahoma
- List of people executed in Oklahoma
- List of people executed in the United States in 2024
- List of serial killers in the United States

Executions carried out in Oklahoma
Preceded by Phillip Dean Hancock November 30, 2023	Michael Dewayne Smith; April 4, 2024	Succeeded by Richard Norman Rojem Jr. June 27, 2024
Executions carried out in the United States
Preceded by Willie James Pye – Georgia March 20, 2024	Michael Dewayne Smith – Oklahoma; April 4, 2024	Succeeded by Brian Joseph Dorsey – Missouri April 9, 2024
