= Hinton, Oklahoma =

Town in Oklahoma, US

- Town
- Motto: "Always Growing Always Prospering"
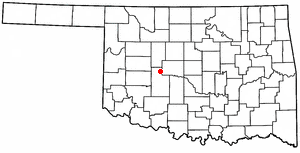
- Location of Hinton, Oklahoma
- Coordinates: 35°29′21″N 98°21′27″W
- Country: United States
- State: Oklahoma
- County: Caddo

Area
  - Total: 4.80 sq mi (12.44 km^{2})
  - Land: 4.74 sq mi (12.28 km^{2})
  - Water: 0.062 sq mi (0.16 km^{2})
- Elevation: 1,562 ft (476 m)

Population (2020)
  - Total: 4,917
  - Density: 1,037.4/sq mi (400.54/km^{2})
- Time zone: UTC-6 (Central (CST))
  - Summer (DST): UTC-5 (CDT)
- ZIP code: 73047
- Area codes: 405/572
- FIPS code: 40-34750
- GNIS feature ID: 2412756
- Website: City website

Hinton is a town in Caddo County, Oklahoma, United States. As of the 2020 census, Hinton had a population of 4,917. It is approximately 50 miles (80 km) west of Oklahoma City.

== History ==
The town of Hinton was founded with the establishment of the post office on April 18, 1902, and was originally named Crosby after Herbert D. Crosby, the County Attorney for I County (original name of Caddo County). However, just three months later on July 5, townsite developer Ivan G. Conkin changed the name to Hinton after his wife's family.

== Geography ==
Hinton is located in northeastern Caddo County at an elevation of 1,676 feet (511 m). The town limits extend north from the settled part of town 4 miles (6 km) along U.S. Route 281 to Interstate 40 at Exit 101, from which it is 49 miles (79 km) east to the center of Oklahoma City.

According to the United States Census Bureau, the town of Hinton has a total area of 3.1 square miles (8.1 km^{2}), all land.

Hinton Municipal Airport (FAA ID: 2O8) is about 2 miles northeast, and features a 4001 x 60 ft. (1220 x 18 m) paved runway.

== Demographics ==
Historical population
Census	Pop.	Note	%±
1910	686		—
1920	744		8.5%
1930	1,009		35.6%
1940	842		−16.6%
1950	1,025		21.7%
1960	907		−11.5%
1970	889		−2.0%
1980	1,432		61.1%
1990	1,233		−13.9%
2000	2,175		76.4%
2010	3,196		46.9%
2020	4,917		53.8%
U.S. Decennial Census

=== 2020 census ===
As of the 2020 census, Hinton had a population of 4,917. The median age was 37.2 years. 9.4% of residents were under the age of 18 and 5.6% of residents were 65 years of age or older. For every 100 females there were 509.3 males, and for every 100 females age 18 and over there were 642.3 males age 18 and over.

0.0% of residents lived in urban areas, while 100.0% lived in rural areas.

There were 595 households in Hinton, of which 36.6% had children under the age of 18 living in them. Of all households, 51.8% were married-couple households, 15.5% were households with a male householder and no spouse or partner present, and 27.7% were households with a female householder and no spouse or partner present. About 29.4% of all households were made up of individuals and 14.7% had someone living alone who was 65 years of age or older.

There were 718 housing units, of which 17.1% were vacant. The homeowner vacancy rate was 3.6% and the rental vacancy rate was 17.9%.

Racial composition as of the 2020 census
Race	Number	Percent
White	3,725	75.8%
Black or African American	293	6.0%
American Indian and Alaska Native	271	5.5%
Asian	21	0.4%
Native Hawaiian and Other Pacific Islander	0	0.0%
Some other race	376	7.6%
Two or more races	231	4.7%
Hispanic or Latino (of any race)	2,215	45.0%

=== 2000 census ===
As of the census of 2000, there were 2,175 people, 575 households, and 412 families residing in the town. The population density was 691.5 inhabitants per square mile (267.0/km^{2}). There were 667 housing units at an average density of 211.7 per square mile (81.7/km^{2}). The racial makeup of the town was 73.66% White, 13.15% African American, 4.83% Native American, 0.14% Asian, 4.37% from other races, and 3.86% from two or more races. Hispanic or Latino of any race were 8.46% of the population.

There were 575 households, out of which 36.2% had children under the age of 18 living with them, 56.5% were married couples living together, 12.0% had a female householder with no husband present, and 28.3% were non-families. 26.3% of all households were made up of individuals, and 15.1% had someone living alone who was 65 years of age or older. The average household size was 2.50 and the average family size was 3.01.

In the town, the population was spread out, with 18.9% under the age of 18, 11.6% from 18 to 24, 38.6% from 25 to 44, 18.8% from 45 to 64, and 12.1% who were 65 years of age or older. The median age was 35 years. For every 100 females, there were 175.0 males. For every 100 females age 18 and over, there were 197.0 males.

The median income for a household in the town was $29,028, and the median income for a family was $33,239. Males had a median income of $25,455 versus $20,556 for females. The per capita income for the town was $12,105. About 12.2% of families and 16.2% of the population were below the poverty line, including 19.7% of those under age 18 and 16.8% of those age 65 or over.

== Tourism ==
Red Rock Canyon Adventure Park is located 1 mile (1.6 km) south of downtown Hinton. The park is a favorite of rappellers due to the canyon's cliff formations. It also boasts beautiful trees, especially in the fall when the color of the leaves begin to turn. Camping and day picnicking are allowed, and there is a 1-acre (4,000 m^{2}) lake for fishing. Hiking around the canyon is allowed within park limits. The park has a pool that offers two water slides into the 8-foot-deep (2.4 m) water as well as water 3 feet (0.91 m) deep for younger swimmers. The pool is overseen by certified lifeguards, and at least one lifeguard is on duty at all times.

Care must be taken while hiking in the canyon as the area is known for rattlesnakes. Copperhead snakes, while uncommon, have been reported in the area.

== Corrections ==
Hinton is also the site of the Great Plains Correctional Institution, opened in 1991 as the state's first private prison, and holding non-U.S. citizen federal inmates as of 2016.

== Casinos ==
Sugar Creek Casino is located just off I-40 in Hinton. The casino is an enterprise of the Wichita and affiliated tribes. Casino Oklahoma is located just off I-40 on the east side of U.S. 281 and Hinton Boulevard, and is an enterprise of the Delaware Nation.

== Notable people ==
- Lou Moore (1904-1956): Former American race car driver and owner. Won five Indianapolis 500s as a team owner. Known as one of the most successful owners in Indycar history.
