= National Register of Historic Places listings in Caddo County, Oklahoma =

Location of Caddo County in Oklahoma

This is a list of the National Register of Historic Places listings in Caddo County, Oklahoma.

This is intended to be a complete list of the properties and districts on the National Register of Historic Places in Caddo County, Oklahoma, United States. The locations of National Register properties and districts for which the latitude and longitude coordinates are included below, may be seen in a map.

There are 14 properties and districts listed on the National Register in the county.

This National Park Service list is complete through NPS recent listings posted September 26, 2025.

== Current listings ==
	Name on the Register	Image	Date listed	Location	City or town	Description
1	Amphlett Brothers Drug and Jewelry Store	Amphlett Brothers Drug and Jewelry Store	May 11, 1982 (#82003669)	Evans and Coblake Aves. 34°53′35″N 98°21′55″W	Apache	
2	Anadarko Armory	Anadarko Armory	May 20, 1994 (#94000479)	700 W. Oklahoma St. 35°04′24″N 98°15′14″W	Anadarko	
3	Anadarko Downtown Historic District	Anadarko Downtown Historic District	December 10, 1990 (#82005385)	Roughly bounded by the Chicago, Rock Island and Pacific railroad line and E. 2nd and W. 3rd Sts. 35°04′32″N 98°14′36″W	Anadarko	
4	Apache State Bank	Apache State Bank	July 17, 1972 (#72001060)	Evans and Coblake; 34°53′35″N 98°21′57″W	Apache	
5	Bridgeport Bridge		November 30, 2020 (#100005858)	North US 281 over the South Canadian R. 35°32′29″N 98°19′15″W	Bridgeport	
6	Bridgeport Hill-Hydro OK 66 Segment		March 3, 2004 (#04000129)	State Highway 66 from Hydro east to a spur of U.S. Route 281; 35°32′29″N 98°24′43″W	Hydro	Extends into Canadian County
7	Caddo County Medicine Creek Archeological District		March 28, 1995 (#95000235)	Address Restricted	Binger	
8	First Baptist Church (Colored)	First Baptist Church (Colored)	December 11, 2007 (#07001263)	Junction of E. Washington Ave. and NE. 5th St. 35°04′42″N 98°14′14″W	Anadarko	
9	Fort Cobb Site	Fort Cobb Site	March 1, 1973 (#73001556)	1 mile east of Fort Cobb; 35°05′49″N 98°25′21″W	Fort Cobb	
10	Provine Service Station	Provine Service Station	July 17, 1997 (#97000803)	0.5 miles east of the junction of Interstate 40 and State Highway 58; 35°32′13″N 98°34′25″W	Hydro	
11	Randlett Park	Randlett Park	September 2, 2003 (#03000878)	Washita River south to Central Boulevard and east to 7th St. 35°04′26″N 98°15′23″W	Anadarko	
12	Rock Island Passenger Station		August 31, 2018 (#100002874)	301 E Main St. 35°04′36″N 98°14′23″W	Anadarko	
13	Rock Mary	Rock Mary	June 22, 1970 (#70000528)	4 miles west of Hinton; 35°27′35″N 98°25′32″W	Hinton	
14	Stevens Rock Shelter		March 28, 1995 (#95000237)	Address Restricted	Gracemont	

== Former listing ==
	Name on the Register	Image	Date listed	Date removed	Location	City or town	Description
1	Black Beaver's Grave		May 11, 1973 (#73002256)	September 1, 1975	N of Anadarko	Anadarko vicinity	Relocated to Fort Hill cemetery in 1975.

== See also ==
- List of National Historic Landmarks in Oklahoma
- National Register of Historic Places listings in Oklahoma
