= Salyer Lake =

Man-made lake in Oklahoma, USA

- Location of Salyer Lake in Oklahoma
- Location: Caddo County, Oklahoma
- Coordinates: 35°19′56″N 98°12′31″W
- Type: Reservoir
- Surface area: 6 acres (0.024 km^{2})
- Surface elevation: 1,453 feet (443 m)

Salyer Lake is a reservoir in Caddo County, Oklahoma at an elevation of 1,453 feet. It is about 17 miles west of Minco, Oklahoma on SH-37 and SH-152. The lake is about 6 acres in size. Available fish species include Largemouth bass.

The short creek on which the reservoir is located flows south-southwest to become a tributary of White Bread Creek, which originates northwest of the lake and flows south and then south-southwest. White Bread Creek later becomes a tributary of Sugar Creek northwest of Gracemont, Oklahoma, which in turn continues south-southeast to be become a tributary of the Washita River.
