= 1928 United States presidential election in Oklahoma =

- November 6, 1928

Nominee	Herbert Hoover	Al Smith
Party	Republican	Democratic
Home state	California	New York
Running mate	Charles Curtis	Joseph T. Robinson
Electoral vote	10	0
Popular vote	394,046	219,174
Percentage	63.72%	35.44%
County results
Hoover
50–60%
60–70%
70–80%
Smith
40–50%
50–60%
60–70%
President before election
Calvin Coolidge
Republican
Elected President
Herbert Hoover
Republican

The 1928 United States presidential election in Oklahoma took place on November 6, 1928, as part of the 1928 United States presidential election which was held throughout all contemporary 48 states. Voters chose ten representatives, or electors to the Electoral College, who voted for president and vice president.

== Background and analysis ==
In its early years, Oklahoma was a "Solid South" state whose founding fathers like "Alfalfa Bill" Murray and Charles N. Haskell had disfranchised most of its black population via literacy tests and grandfather clauses, the latter of which would be declared unconstitutional in Guinn v. United States. In 1920 this "Solid South" state, nonetheless, joined the Republican landslide of Warren G. Harding, electing a GOP senator and five congressmen, but in 1922 the Democratic Party returned to their typical ascendancy as the state GOP became heatedly divided amongst themselves.

Like many states in the South, Oklahoma, almost entirely part of the Southern Protestant "Bible Belt", had significant influence from the Ku Klux Klan at that time. The nomination of anti-Prohibition Catholic New York Governor Al Smith as the Democratic nominee was thus extremely controversial, with prominent former Senator Robert Latham Owen refusing steadfastly to endorse him, despite nominating dry Southern Democrat Senator Joseph Taylor Robinson of Arkansas.

Early polls showed a massive trend away from Smith, with a September poll saying seventy-six thousand Oklahoma Democrats would vote for Republican nominees, former Secretary of Commerce Herbert Hoover of California and Senate Majority Leader Charles Curtis of Kansas, and a mid-October poll saying Hoover would receive seventy percent of the vote in Oklahoma. At the end of October, although the number of Oklahoma Democrats believed to be supporting Hoover had not fallen, and a finding that the Republicans had helped enroll one hundred and fifty thousand new voters, Hoover's margin was reduced to fifty thousand.

As it turned out, the later poll was over-favourable to Smith. Hoover ultimately won the state by a margin of 28.28 percentage points. This was the first election since statehood when Oklahoma had voted more Republican than the nation at large, and the only one until 1960. In some previously Democratic counties in southwestern Oklahoma, Hoover gained vote shares more than thirty percent higher than Calvin Coolidge had in 1924, despite the fact that Smith visited the state in September and gave a major speech on the issue of religious tolerance.

Hoover carried all but eleven of Oklahoma's 77 counties, with only culturally Southern Choctaw Country or Little Dixie in the southeast remaining loyal to Smith, and even there Democratic margins were smaller than usual for the era. He was the only Republican until Richard Nixon’s 1972 landslide to carry the following counties: Carter, Cotton, Harmon, Jackson, Jefferson, Murray and Tillman. Hoover was also the first Republican presidential candidate to win the following counties: Beckham, Cleveland, Grady, Hughes, McClain and Pontotoc.

== Results ==
1928 United States presidential election in Oklahoma
Party	Candidate	Votes	Percentage	Electoral votes
Republican	Herbert Hoover	394,046	63.72%	10
Democratic	Alfred E. Smith	219,174	35.44%	0
Socialist	Norman Thomas	3,924	0.63%	0
Farmer Labor	Frank Webb	1,283	0.21%	0
Totals		618,427	100.00%	10

=== Results by county ===
County	Herbert Hoover Republican		Al Smith Democratic		Norman Thomas Socialist		Frank E. Webb Farmer–Labor		Margin		Total votes cast
County	#	%	#	%	#	%	#	%	#	%	Total votes cast
Adair	2,867	59.35%	1,944	40.24%	14	0.29%	6	0.12%	923	19.11%	4,831
Alfalfa	4,224	77.98%	1,086	20.05%	83	1.53%	24	0.44%	3,138	57.93%	5,417
Atoka	1,572	42.94%	2,056	56.16%	24	0.66%	9	0.25%	-484	-13.22%	3,661
Beaver	2,596	73.67%	887	25.17%	33	0.94%	8	0.23%	1,709	48.50%	3,524
Beckham	3,810	62.36%	2,201	36.02%	78	1.28%	21	0.34%	1,609	26.33%	6,110
Blaine	3,413	67.83%	1,543	30.66%	65	1.29%	11	0.22%	1,870	37.16%	5,032
Bryan	3,014	43.37%	3,885	55.90%	30	0.43%	21	0.30%	-871	-12.53%	6,950
Caddo	7,313	64.27%	3,885	34.14%	123	1.08%	57	0.50%	3,428	30.13%	11,378
Canadian	5,011	63.63%	2,786	35.38%	54	0.69%	24	0.30%	2,225	28.25%	7,875
Carter	6,538	55.80%	5,086	43.41%	77	0.66%	15	0.13%	1,452	12.39%	11,716
Cherokee	2,963	54.49%	2,446	44.98%	16	0.29%	13	0.24%	517	9.51%	5,438
Choctaw	2,541	49.32%	2,581	50.10%	23	0.45%	7	0.14%	-40	-0.78%	5,152
Cimarron	1,139	66.03%	566	32.81%	14	0.81%	6	0.35%	573	33.22%	1,725
Cleveland	3,738	61.35%	2,291	37.60%	50	0.82%	14	0.23%	1,447	23.75%	6,093
Coal	1,283	42.82%	1,681	56.11%	19	0.63%	13	0.43%	-398	-13.28%	2,996
Comanche	5,069	62.45%	2,956	36.42%	70	0.86%	22	0.27%	2,113	26.03%	8,117
Cotton	2,419	59.76%	1,605	39.65%	19	0.47%	5	0.12%	814	20.11%	4,048
Craig	3,511	54.48%	2,897	44.96%	23	0.36%	13	0.20%	614	9.53%	6,444
Creek	12,254	67.92%	5,693	31.55%	67	0.37%	28	0.16%	6,561	36.37%	18,042
Custer	4,576	68.56%	1,995	29.89%	93	1.39%	10	0.15%	2,581	38.67%	6,674
Delaware	2,603	59.70%	1,706	39.13%	33	0.76%	18	0.41%	897	20.57%	4,360
Dewey	2,486	65.35%	1,175	30.89%	112	2.94%	31	0.81%	1,311	34.46%	3,804
Ellis	1,953	62.80%	1,122	36.08%	25	0.80%	10	0.32%	831	26.72%	3,110
Garfield	12,748	77.77%	3,503	21.37%	90	0.55%	51	0.31%	9,245	56.40%	16,392
Garvin	3,321	47.44%	3,589	51.26%	72	1.03%	19	0.27%	-268	-3.83%	7,001
Grady	6,332	62.64%	3,667	36.27%	84	0.83%	26	0.26%	2,665	26.36%	10,109
Grant	4,371	74.30%	1,449	24.63%	47	0.80%	16	0.27%	2,922	49.67%	5,883
Greer	2,262	57.48%	1,645	41.80%	13	0.33%	15	0.38%	617	15.68%	3,935
Harmon	1,431	56.85%	1,060	42.11%	18	0.72%	8	0.32%	371	14.74%	2,517
Harper	1,844	66.45%	872	31.42%	47	1.69%	12	0.43%	972	35.03%	2,775
Haskell	2,580	53.95%	2,172	45.42%	13	0.27%	17	0.36%	408	8.53%	4,782
Hughes	3,937	55.18%	3,169	44.41%	23	0.32%	6	0.08%	768	10.76%	7,135
Jackson	3,440	57.72%	2,493	41.83%	21	0.35%	6	0.10%	947	15.89%	5,960
Jefferson	2,251	53.79%	1,916	45.78%	12	0.29%	6	0.14%	335	8.00%	4,185
Johnston	1,294	41.80%	1,766	57.04%	27	0.87%	9	0.29%	-472	-15.25%	3,096
Kay	13,829	76.15%	4,196	23.10%	95	0.52%	41	0.23%	9,633	53.04%	18,161
Kingfisher	4,063	69.08%	1,780	30.26%	27	0.46%	12	0.20%	2,283	38.81%	5,882
Kiowa	4,116	63.54%	2,270	35.04%	66	1.02%	26	0.40%	1,846	28.50%	6,478
Latimer	1,368	45.77%	1,583	52.96%	21	0.70%	17	0.57%	-215	-7.19%	2,989
Le Flore	5,168	52.48%	4,622	46.94%	37	0.38%	20	0.20%	546	5.54%	9,847
Lincoln	6,118	70.74%	2,405	27.81%	102	1.18%	24	0.28%	3,713	42.93%	8,649
Logan	6,277	72.72%	2,251	26.08%	74	0.86%	30	0.35%	4,026	46.64%	8,632
Love	843	39.93%	1,268	60.07%	0	0.00%	0	0.00%	-425	-20.13%	2,111
Major	2,891	78.73%	674	18.36%	91	2.48%	16	0.44%	2,217	60.38%	3,672
Marshall	1,063	42.50%	1,358	54.30%	70	2.80%	10	0.40%	-295	-11.80%	2,501
Mayes	3,004	57.61%	2,161	41.45%	40	0.77%	9	0.17%	843	16.17%	5,214
McClain	2,399	55.07%	1,913	43.92%	32	0.73%	12	0.28%	486	11.16%	4,356
McCurtain	1,915	39.79%	2,877	59.78%	17	0.35%	4	0.08%	-962	-19.99%	4,813
McIntosh	2,742	56.88%	2,044	42.40%	28	0.58%	7	0.15%	698	14.48%	4,821
Murray	1,631	51.53%	1,498	47.33%	26	0.82%	10	0.32%	133	4.20%	3,165
Muskogee	9,972	60.92%	6,343	38.75%	37	0.23%	17	0.10%	3,629	22.17%	16,369
Noble	3,607	66.21%	1,777	32.62%	41	0.75%	23	0.42%	1,830	33.59%	5,448
Nowata	2,930	62.18%	1,763	37.42%	12	0.25%	7	0.15%	1,167	24.77%	4,712
Okfuskee	3,612	58.25%	2,513	40.53%	61	0.98%	15	0.24%	1,099	17.72%	6,201
Oklahoma	36,608	69.13%	16,073	30.35%	237	0.45%	35	0.07%	20,535	38.78%	52,953
Okmulgee	9,149	60.77%	5,834	38.75%	64	0.43%	9	0.06%	3,315	22.02%	15,056
Osage	10,555	67.52%	5,010	32.05%	57	0.36%	10	0.06%	5,545	35.47%	15,632
Ottawa	8,144	64.03%	4,488	35.28%	69	0.54%	19	0.15%	3,656	28.74%	12,720
Pawnee	4,489	68.82%	1,949	29.88%	66	1.01%	19	0.29%	2,540	38.94%	6,523
Payne	7,864	72.19%	2,904	26.66%	83	0.76%	42	0.39%	4,960	45.53%	10,893
Pittsburg	5,875	49.20%	5,960	49.91%	87	0.73%	20	0.17%	-85	-0.71%	11,942
Pontotoc	3,356	50.87%	3,203	48.55%	26	0.39%	12	0.18%	153	2.32%	6,597
Pottawatomie	8,478	68.57%	3,797	30.71%	58	0.47%	31	0.25%	4,681	37.86%	12,364
Pushmataha	1,616	52.88%	1,384	45.29%	44	1.44%	12	0.39%	232	7.59%	3,056
Roger Mills	1,948	63.51%	986	32.15%	114	3.72%	19	0.62%	962	31.37%	3,067
Rogers	3,477	61.38%	2,147	37.90%	31	0.55%	10	0.18%	1,330	23.48%	5,665
Seminole	8,072	64.60%	4,423	35.40%	0	0.00%	0	0.00%	3,649	29.20%	12,495
Sequoyah	3,296	55.04%	2,692	44.96%	0	0.00%	0	0.00%	604	10.09%	5,988
Stephens	5,192	62.71%	2,982	36.02%	80	0.97%	25	0.30%	2,210	26.69%	8,279
Texas	2,890	69.16%	1,240	29.67%	33	0.79%	16	0.38%	1,650	39.48%	4,179
Tillman	3,331	60.60%	2,141	38.95%	17	0.31%	8	0.15%	1,190	21.65%	5,497
Tulsa	38,769	70.49%	16,062	29.20%	128	0.23%	39	0.07%	22,707	41.29%	54,998
Wagoner	2,726	60.62%	1,745	38.80%	19	0.42%	7	0.16%	981	21.81%	4,497
Washington	7,258	73.48%	2,563	25.95%	41	0.42%	15	0.15%	4,695	47.53%	9,877
Washita	3,572	63.28%	2,024	35.85%	35	0.62%	14	0.25%	1,548	27.42%	5,645
Woods	3,941	70.38%	1,550	27.68%	87	1.55%	22	0.39%	2,391	42.70%	5,600
Woodward	3,188	69.06%	1,347	29.18%	59	1.28%	22	0.48%	1,841	39.88%	4,616
Total	394,046	63.72%	219,174	35.44%	3,924	0.63%	1,283	0.21%	174,872	28.28%	618,427

== Electors ==
Presidential Electors
Party	Pledged to	Elector	Residence
Democratic Party	Al Smith	Charles M. Delzell	Cherokee
Democratic Party	Al Smith	R. L. Evans	Hugo
Democratic Party	Al Smith	O. E. Durham	Okeene
Democratic Party	Al Smith	Edna V. Palmer	Okemah
Democratic Party	Al Smith	T. A. Blaylock	Madill
Democratic Party	Al Smith	Archibald Bond	Muskogee
Democratic Party	Al Smith	Elmer V. Jessee	Mangum
Democratic Party	Al Smith	Theo. D. B. Frear	Vinita
Democratic Party	Al Smith	H. T. Miller	Oklahoma City
Democratic Party	Al Smith	Luther Harrison	Oklahoma City
Republican Party	Herbert Hoover	Irene L. Sams	Nowata
Republican Party	Herbert Hoover	Thomas C. Humphry	Hugo
Republican Party	Herbert Hoover	Charles E. Henderson	Sapulpa
Republican Party	Herbert Hoover	Gladys M. Hunt	Temple
Republican Party	Herbert Hoover	Alice M. Vogle	Snyder
Republican Party	Herbert Hoover	Ross Rizley	Guymon
Republican Party	Herbert Hoover	Edna M. Mason	Newkirk
Republican Party	Herbert Hoover	Helen H. Meister	Oklahoma City
Republican Party	Herbert Hoover	Althea J. Newcomer	Muskogee
Republican Party	Herbert Hoover	Elsie M. Northup	Oklahoma City
Farmer–Labor Party	Frank Webb	J. K. Phelps	Cogar
Farmer–Labor Party	Frank Webb	John Franing	Norman
Farmer–Labor Party	Frank Webb	Geo. L. VanLaw	Chickasha
Farmer–Labor Party	Frank Webb	Geo. Lightner	Olustee
Farmer–Labor Party	Frank Webb	Peter Hess	Enid
Farmer–Labor Party	Frank Webb	A. L. Campbell	Randlett
Farmer–Labor Party	Frank Webb	G. A. Stewart	Ripley
Farmer–Labor Party	Frank Webb	Herman C. Patzwald	El Reno
Farmer–Labor Party	Frank Webb	C. C. Miller	Stroud
Farmer–Labor Party	Frank Webb	Harry Lindsey	Shawnee
Socialist Party	Norman Thomas	L. K. Rhodyback	Oklahoma City
Socialist Party	Norman Thomas	F. B. Kusler	Choctaw
Socialist Party	Norman Thomas	Rose Gates	Oklahoma City
Socialist Party	Norman Thomas	Will Schaeffer	Edmond
Socialist Party	Norman Thomas	M. T. Boulware	Hammon
Socialist Party	Norman Thomas	Edward L. McCombs	Kaw
Socialist Party	Norman Thomas	O. E. Samuelson	Capron
Socialist Party	Norman Thomas	W. W. Campbell	Shawnee
Socialist Party	Norman Thomas	J. D. Newton	Carnegie
Socialist Party	Norman Thomas	H. C. Brooks	Mountain View

== See also ==
- United States presidential elections in Oklahoma
