= Spring Creek, Oklahoma =

Unincorporated community in Oklahoma, US

- Unincorporated community
- Location within the state of Oklahoma Spring Creek (the United States)
- Coordinates: 35°15′42″N 98°10′59″W
- Country: United States
- State: Oklahoma
- County: Caddo
- Elevation: 1,293 ft (394 m)
- Time zone: UTC-6 (Central (CST))
  - Summer (DST): UTC-5 (CDT)
- GNIS feature ID: 1100845

Spring Creek is an unincorporated community in Caddo County, Oklahoma, United States. It is about 6 miles (10 km) south-southwest of Cogar, and just east of the Spring Creek watercourse that feeds into Lake Chickasha. It has a cemetery, church, schoolhouse, and general store still standing. The cemetery and church are still used. The remaining general store (there were once two at the same time) is now a house. The schoolhouse is block and was built around the turn of the 20th century. The surrounding area is very sandy and features much red rock.
