= Alfalfa, Oklahoma =

Unincorporated community in Oklahoma, US

- Unincorporated community
- Location within Oklahoma
- Coordinates: 35°13′08″N 98°36′26″W
- Country: United States
- State: Oklahoma
- County: Caddo
- Elevation: 1,460 ft (445 m)
- Time zone: UTC-6 (Central (CST))
  - Summer (DST): UTC-5 (CDT)
- Area code: 580
- GNIS feature ID: 1089581

Alfalfa is an unincorporated community in western Caddo County, Oklahoma, United States. Alfalfa is located on Oklahoma State Highway 58, 8 miles (13 km) north of Carnegie and 9 miles (14 km) south of Eakly. Fort Cobb Lake and state park are approximately five miles to the east.

The community was originally named "Boise," but it was later changed to "Alfalfa" to avoid confusion with Boise City, Oklahoma. The community was so named on account of alfalfa fields near the original town site. The town is old enough to appear on a 1911 Rand McNally map of the county.
