= Minco, Oklahoma =

- City
- Nickname: The Land of Milk and Honey
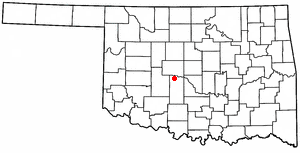
- Location of Minco, Oklahoma
- Coordinates: 35°19′03″N 97°57′06″W
- Country: United States
- State: Oklahoma
- County: Grady

Government
  - Mayor: Matt Gore

Area
  - Total: 12.31 sq mi (31.88 km^{2})
  - Land: 12.27 sq mi (31.79 km^{2})
  - Water: 0.035 sq mi (0.09 km^{2})
- Elevation: 1,309 ft (399 m)

Population (2020)
  - Total: 1,500
  - Density: 122.2/sq mi (47.18/km^{2})
- Time zone: UTC-6 (Central (CST))
  - Summer (DST): UTC-5 (CDT)
- ZIP code: 73059
- Area code: 405
- FIPS code: 40-48750
- GNIS feature ID: 2411117
- Website: minco-ok.gov

Minco is a city in Grady County, Oklahoma, United States. The population was 1,500 at the 2020 census, a 8.1% decrease from 2010.

== History ==
Present-day Minco began as a settlement named Silver City on the Chisholm Trail. The community was initially a collection of tents housing Caddo, Wichita, Kiowa, and Comanche tribesmen. It was approximately 7 miles (11 km) east of the present-day location. After the Rock Island extended its railroad track to the Chisholm Trail, the town physically moved to the end of the rail line and renamed itself Minco. (Note: The Silver City Cemetery continues to exist, and was restored in 2025.)

The town was originally included in the Chickasaw Nation. Minco is believed to be named after the great Chickasaw chief and warrior, Itawamba Minco, (Note: Minco is said to mean "Big Chief" in the Choctaw language. The Encyclopedia of Oklahoma History and Culture says it simply means "chief.") who later acquired the name of Levi Colbert, and who resided on Chickasaw land in Mississippi, near Cotton Gin Port. Minco was officially settled sometime circa 1890, several years before Oklahoma achieved statehood. The post office opened in July 1890.

In its early stages, Minco was a very busy town because of its location at the end of the Chicago, Rock Island & Pacific Railroad until the railroad was extended further south two years later. Charles B. Campbell owned the occupancy rights of the land that the town was built on. His wife was Miss Maggie (Margaret) Williams, a daughter of W. G. (Caddo Bill) Williams, owner of the Half Moon Ranch, who started Silver City in 1872, by building a trading store for those cattlemen driving their herds of cattle up the Chisholm Trail.

Before the establishment of Minco as a town, three major expeditions passed through the area. The first expedition was conducted by Captain Randolph B. Marcy in 1849. (Note: Marcy later became famous for his 1859 book, The Prairie Traveler: A Handbook for Overland Expeditions, with Maps, Illustrations, and Itineraries of the Principal Routes between the Mississippi and the Pacific. During the Civil War, he served as chief of staff to George A. Custer, who had married a daughter of Marcy, then was appointed as Inspector General of the U.S. Army, and was ultimately promoted to full general in 1877.) Marcy was ordered to escort 1,500 individuals headed to the California gold fields. When the expedition approached the Minco area they kept to the south side of Buggy Creek, which Marcy named "Deer Creek". Marcy named his route the Fort Smith to Santa Fe Trail. There was a road established in 1839–1840 on the north side of the Canadian River, that was also named the Fort Smith to Santa Fe Trail. This road had been laid out by Josiah Gregg, a Santa Fe merchant who had connections with merchants in Fort Smith, Arkansas.

During the summer of 1853, the first railroad survey was conducted from Fort Smith to Los Angeles by Lt. Amiel Weeks Whipple. Whipple's survey followed Marcy's route from Fort Smith, until they reached the Caddo County Buttes. At that point the expedition moved westward, whereas Marcy had turned north to join the Fort Smith to the Santa Fe Trail, not far north of Hydro. Whipple continued westward, leaving Oklahoma just west of the Antelope Hills in present-day Roger Mills County.

The Rock Island Railroad Co.'s original purpose in extending the railroad to Minco was to provide a gateway for the shipping of cattle from the grazing lands of the Chickasaw Nation, just to the south of the town. On August 4, 1901, the Chickasaw Nation's land was opened to white settlement, making Minco a railroad hub for the entire region.

On October 14, 1901, local citizens formed a company for the purpose of selling vacant lots in the town to encourage settlement. It was known as the Minco Townsite and Investment Company.

Minco was originally composed mainly of merchants who provided supplies for the many travelers that used the railroad infrastructure of the town. It is the oldest town in the western part of Oklahoma, so its many businesses served residents for many miles around. The hardware store and tin shop originally opened by Kirk Woodworth in 1891 is still in existence. The remains of some of the hotels that were used by the many temporary residents stand along its Main Street.

In September 1894 Meta Chestnutt, a teacher from North Carolina who was determined to bring education to the frontier, specifically to Native Americans, along with the services of J.H. Bond, established the El Meta Bond College, one of the first of its kind in the area. The college offered elementary, grammar, and high school courses along with some music and drama courses. Having faced economic troubles for the whole of its existence, it was decommissioned in 1920 due to decreasing enrollment after the arrival of newer educational institutions that came with statehood. After the demolition of the old school building, a modern masonry armory was constructed in 1936 and today serves as a community gathering center. A community park occupies part of the old campus. In this park there is a plaque commemorating Meta Chestnutt and her contributions to the school.

In 1960, the first municipal natural gas company in Oklahoma was founded in Minco by James Burton Branum Jr. It operated along with the Minco Tag Agency from an office in the back of what was then Branum's Variety Store on Main street.

In 2007, the Minco Historical Society established a museum to exhibit the numerous historical facts associated with the town.

== Geography ==
Minco is located in northern Grady County. The city limits extend north to the Canadian River, which serves as the border with Canadian County. U.S. Route 81 passes through the center of town, leading north 16 miles (26 km) to El Reno and south 19 miles (31 km) to Chickasha, the Grady County seat. Oklahoma State Highway 37 leads east from the center of Minco 8 miles (13 km) to Tuttle and west from the northern part of Minco 10 miles (16 km) to Cogar. Oklahoma City is 35 miles (56 km) to the northeast of Minco.

In the 2010 census, Minco had a total area of 12.3 square miles (31.9 km^{2}), of which 12.3 square miles (31.8 km^{2}) is land and 0.04 square miles (0.1 km^{2}), or 0.28%, is water.

A musical tour of the town by comic Lucas Ross can be seen here.

== Demographics ==
Historical population
Census	Pop.	Note	%±
1910	706		—
1920	606		−14.2%
1930	962		58.7%
1940	921		−4.3%
1950	978		6.2%
1960	1,021		4.4%
1970	1,129		10.6%
1980	1,489		31.9%
1990	1,411		−5.2%
2000	1,672		18.5%
2010	1,632		−2.4%
2020	1,500		−8.1%
U.S. Decennial Census

=== 2020 census ===
As of the 2020 census, Minco had a population of 1,500. The median age was 38.9 years, 25.6% of residents were under the age of 18, and 16.9% of residents were 65 years of age or older. For every 100 females there were 90.8 males, and for every 100 females age 18 and over there were 88.2 males age 18 and over.

According to the 2020 census, 0% of residents lived in urban areas while 100.0% lived in rural areas.

There were 614 households in Minco, of which 33.4% had children under the age of 18 living in them. Of all households, 51.0% were married-couple households, 16.9% were households with a male householder and no spouse or partner present, and 28.3% were households with a female householder and no spouse or partner present. About 29.3% of all households were made up of individuals and 16.3% had someone living alone who was 65 years of age or older.

There were 688 housing units, of which 10.8% were vacant. Among occupied housing units, 71.3% were owner-occupied and 28.7% were renter-occupied. The homeowner vacancy rate was 1.6% and the rental vacancy rate was 8.5%.

Racial composition as of the 2020 census
Race	Percent
White	82.3%
Black or African American	0.1%
American Indian and Alaska Native	3.8%
Asian	0%
Native Hawaiian and Other Pacific Islander	0%
Some other race	3.3%
Two or more races	10.4%
Hispanic or Latino (of any race)	8.2%

=== 2000 census ===
In the 2000 census, there were 1,672 people, 658 households, and 467 families living in Minco. The population density was 136.5 inhabitants per square mile (52.7/km^{2}). There were 714 housing units at an average density of 58.3 per square mile (22.5/km^{2}). The racial makeup of the city was 91.99% White, 0.06% African American, 3.11% Native American, 0.06% Asian, 2.33% from other races, and 2.45% from two or more races. Hispanic or Latino of any race were 3.47% of the population.

In 2000, there were 658 households, out of which 36.3% had children under the age of 18 living with them, 59.7% were married couples living together, 7.6% had a female householder with no husband present, and 28.9% were non-families. 27.1% of all households were made up of individuals, and 16.4% had someone living alone who was 65 years of age or older. The average household size was 2.54 and the average family size was 3.07.

In 2000, 29.1% of Minco's population were under the age of 18, 7.8% were aged from 18 to 24, 26.8% were aged from 25 to 44, 20.7% were aged from 45 to 64, and 15.7% were 65 years of age or older. In 2000, the median age was 36 years. For every 100 females, there were 93.3 males. For every 100 females age 18 and over, there were 92.5 males.

In 2000, the median income for a household in Minco was $31,098, and the median income for a family was $40,223. Males had a median income of $30,357 versus $22,426 for females. The per capita income for Minco was $18,331. About 9.7% of families and 13.5% of the population were below the poverty line, including 13.2% of those under age 18, and 22.3% of those age 65 or over.

== Economy ==
=== Agriculture ===
A sign at the city limits reads, "Welcome to Minco, The Land of Milk and Honey". It is based on the town having a large number of dairy farmers and Oklahoma's largest beekeeping company, Gibson-Ross Clover Bloom Honey. Since 1990, every first Saturday of December, Minco brings in thousands of tourists to the Christmas Honey Festival. Jim Ross, owner of the Ross Honey Company, gives tours all day and shows the entire honey production process.

=== Electric power generation ===
In 2012, construction began on a series of wind farms near Minco, named Minco I, Minco II, and Minco III. In 2017, the wind farms generated 300 megawatts of electricity, some of which is used to power Google's Mayes County, Oklahoma facility.

== Media ==
Minco has two weekly newspapers. The Minco Millennium is located on the corner of Main Street and Highway 81, and has been published every week since the summer of 1998. The Minco-Union City Times is a newspaper that serves Minco and Union City.

Minco's earlier newspapers and years of publication since origin are as follows:

- Minco Minstrel, 1890–1897, 190?-1916, 1921–1999
- Minco Monitor, 1892–1899
- Minco Weekly, 1899–1900
- Minco Herald, 1916–1921 (this time period fills in the Minstrel gap)

Microfilm copies of these papers are available at the Oklahoma Historical Society building, south of the state capital, on the second floor.

== Government ==
Minco has a mayor and four council members. There are four wards, with one council member from each. It has its own police department and a fire department.

== Notable person ==
- Sherri Hill, fashion designer
