= Sickles, Oklahoma =

Unincorporated community in Oklahoma, US

- Unincorporated community
- Location within Oklahoma
- Coordinates: 35°21′46″N 98°26′52″W
- Country: United States
- State: Oklahoma
- County: Caddo
- Elevation: 1,634 ft (498 m)
- Time zone: UTC-6 (Central (CST))
  - Summer (DST): UTC-5 (CDT)
- Area code: 405
- GNIS feature ID: 1098034

Sickles is an unincorporated community in Caddo County, Oklahoma, United States, located approximately 4.5 miles (7.2 km) west of Lookeba. The town is old enough to appear on a 1911 Rand McNally map of the county.

Children from Sickles attend schools that are part of the Lookeba-Sickles School District founded in 1960.
