= Chickasha Lake =

Man-made reservoir in Oklahoma, US

- Location within Oklahoma Location within the United States
- Location: Caddo County, Oklahoma
- Coordinates: 35°08′28″N 98°08′20″W
- Type: Reservoir
- Etymology: Named for city of Chickasha, Oklahoma
- Primary inflows: Spring Creek, Stinking Creek
- Primary outflows: Spring Creek
- Basin countries: United States
- Built: 1958
- Surface area: 2,068.6 acres (8.371 km^{2})
- Average depth: 16.65 feet (5.07 m)
- Max. depth: 38.2 feet (11.6 m)
- Water volume: 41,080 acre-feet (50,670,000 m^{3})
- Shore length^{1}: 10 miles (16 km)
- Surface elevation: 1,192 feet (363 m)
- Settlements: Chickasha, Oklahoma; Verden, Oklahoma
- ^{1} Shore length is not a well-defined measure.

Chickasha Lake, also known as Lake Chickasha, is a man-made reservoir in the central part of the state of Oklahoma. Located in Caddo County, Oklahoma, it was completed in 1958. The main purposes were supplying water (especially to the city of Chickasha) and for recreation. The lake is about 9 miles (14 km) west of Chickasha, and is owned and operated by that city.

A 2011 survey showed that the lake has a surface area of 2,068.6 acres (8.371 km^{2}) a capacity of 41,080 acre-feet (50,670,000 m^{3}) of water when filled to an elevation of 1,192 feet (363 m). The mean depth was 16.65 feet (5.07 m) and the maximum depth was 38.2 feet (11.6 m). It also has 10 miles of shoreline.

The lake is fed by multiple streams, but primarily Spring Creek on the west arm and Stinking Creek on the east arm.

== Spring Creek ==
The Spring Creek that feeds Lake Chickasha originates east of Salyer Lake and just south of Oklahoma State Highway 152 in Caddo County. It travels generally south and slightly to the east until impounded by the lake. Spring Creek then continues at the south end of the lake, traveling south-southeast to its mouth on the Washita River.

This creek is not to be confused with at least five other creeks in Oklahoma with the “Spring Creek” name, nor with numerous other watercourses named Spring Creek in other states and countries.

== Stinking Creek ==
Stinking Creek originates east of Spring Creek and south of SH-152, at a point south of Cogar, Oklahoma. It flows generally south for 12 miles through Caddo County until impounded at Lake Chickasha. It does not continue past the lake.

Despite the name, the water in Stinking Creek was found in 2012 to have improved enough to meet state dissolved oxygen criteria for support of warm-water aquatic communities, after implementation of best management practices in the watershed.
