= Saul Maslavi =

Iranian-born American businessperson (born 1964)

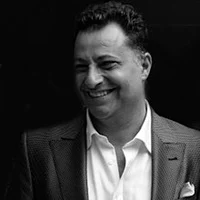
- Born: October 14, 1964 (age 61); Tehran, Imperial State of Persia
- Education: Baruch College
- Occupations: President and CEO
- Label: Jovani Fashion
- Spouse: Orly Maslavi
- Children: 4
- Relatives: Abraham Maslavi (Brother)
- Website: www.jovani.com

Saul Maslavi (born October 14, 1964) is an Iranian-born American businessperson and CEO, best known for his company Jovani Fashion.

== Biography ==
Maslavi was born on October 14, 1964, in Tehran, Imperial State of Persia, to parents Feryal and Jacob Maslavi. He grew up in Tehran until he was eleven years old, after which he moved to England. While in England, Maslavi attended Shiplake College, a boarding school for boys. A year before his scheduled high school graduation from Shiplake, he moved to the United States, where he attended John L. Miller Great Neck North High School. In 1982, Maslavi attended Baruch College in Manhattan.

His father, Jacob, started a fashion company called Jovani. He attended night classes and helped to grow the Jovani brand.

Maslavi married Orly Maslavi, an optometrist from California, in 1993. They have four children, three boys and one girl.

== Jovani Fashion ==
Jovani Fashion was founded in 1983 by Jacob Maslavi and his sons, Abraham and Saul Maslavi. The company started as a ten-person operation, designing and manufacturing fifteen styles of dresses for specialty boutiques. Jovani Fashion began primarily as an evening wear company but explored other markets in 1990, such as the growing prom and cocktail trends. By 1992, Jovani’s popularity had increased and business was booming. Production moved to China, while designs and patterns were still created in the US. In 1996, Jovani brought on American designer Sherri Hill to assist in the expansion of their prom and pageant market; the designer remained with the fashion house for the next twelve years. After his father’s passing in 2006, Maslavi became the unofficial owner of Jovani Fashions. A year later, Maslavi opened a second Jovani showroom in Atlanta, Georgia that was renovated in April 2015.

Celebrities, including Miranda Lambert, Carrie Underwood, Selena Gomez, Ariana Grande, Taylor Swift and Jewel, have worn Jovani’s signature pieces for red carpet, charity, and social events. In 2014, dresses worn by country music star Miranda Lambert were exhibited in the Country Music Hall of Fame in Nashville, Tennessee.

Jovani Fashion remains family owned and has grown to a fifty-person company. Their website states that they serve over 2,000 retailers worldwide, including Neiman Marcus.

Maslavi has expanded Jovani Fashions to include several notable collections, such as JVN by Jovani, a low price point prom line, Maslavi, a contemporary ready-to-wear-line, and Jovani Bridal, a wedding dress line.

In 2014, Saul Maslavi was named President and CEO of Jovani Fashion.

== Charity ==
In 2013, Saul Maslavi and Jovani Fashion partnered with the non-profit Operation PROM, to provide prom dresses to underprivileged high school students.
