= Washita, Oklahoma =

Unincorporated community in Oklahoma, US

- Unincorporated community and Census designated place
- Location within the state of Oklahoma Washita (the United States)
- Coordinates: 35°06′16″N 98°20′29″W
- Country: United States
- State: Oklahoma
- County: Caddo

Area
  - Total: 0.58 sq mi (1.49 km^{2})
  - Land: 0.58 sq mi (1.49 km^{2})
  - Water: 0 sq mi (0.00 km^{2})
- Elevation: 1,237 ft (377 m)

Population (2020)
  - Total: 83
  - Density: 144.7/sq mi (55.85/km^{2})
- Time zone: UTC-6 (Central (CST))
  - Summer (DST): UTC-5 (CDT)
- ZIP codes: 73094
- FIPS code: 40-78750
- GNIS feature ID: 2805360

Washita is a rural community in Caddo County, Oklahoma, United States. As of the 2020 census, Washita had a population of 83. It is located west of Anadarko on a bend in the Washita River. The post office opened April 16, 1910.

A municipal electrical power generation plant for Anadarko is located in Washita.

It is zoned to Anadarko Public Schools.

== Demographics ==
Historical population
Census	Pop.	Note	%±
2020	83		—
U.S. Decennial Census

=== 2020 census ===
As of the 2020 census, Washita had a population of 83. The median age was 40.5 years. 21.7% of residents were under the age of 18 and 20.5% of residents were 65 years of age or older. For every 100 females there were 102.4 males, and for every 100 females age 18 and over there were 91.2 males age 18 and over.

0.0% of residents lived in urban areas, while 100.0% lived in rural areas.

There were 37 households in Washita, of which 21.6% had children under the age of 18 living in them. Of all households, 54.1% were married-couple households, 27.0% were households with a male householder and no spouse or partner present, and 13.5% were households with a female householder and no spouse or partner present. About 24.3% of all households were made up of individuals and 5.4% had someone living alone who was 65 years of age or older.

There were 52 housing units, of which 28.8% were vacant. The homeowner vacancy rate was 0.0% and the rental vacancy rate was 25.0%.

Racial composition as of the 2020 census
Race	Number	Percent
White	53	63.9%
Black or African American	0	0.0%
American Indian and Alaska Native	22	26.5%
Asian	0	0.0%
Native Hawaiian and Other Pacific Islander	0	0.0%
Some other race	1	1.2%
Two or more races	7	8.4%
Hispanic or Latino (of any race)	5	6.0%
