= Alden, Oklahoma =

Unincorporated community in Oklahoma, US

- Unincorporated community
- Location within Oklahoma
- Coordinates: 34°58′31″N 98°35′07″W
- Country: United States
- State: Oklahoma
- County: Caddo
- Elevation: 1,480 ft (450 m)
- Time zone: UTC-6 (Central (CST))
  - Summer (DST): UTC-5 (CDT)
- Area code: 405
- GNIS feature ID: 1100166

Alden is an unincorporated community in western Caddo County, Oklahoma, United States. Alden is one mile east of Oklahoma State Highway 58 approximately 9 miles (14 km) south of Carnegie. The town is old enough to appear on a 1911 Rand McNally map of the county.
