= Oklahoma State Highway 37 =

State highway in Oklahoma, United States

State Highway 37

Route information
- Maintained by ODOT

Section 1
- Length: 65.8 mi (105.9 km)
- West end: US 281 / SH-8 in Hinton
- Major intersections: US 81 in Minco; I-44 / US 62 from Newcastle to Oklahoma City; I-35 / US 77 in Moore
- East end: Sunnylane Road in Moore

Section 2
- Length: 12.54 mi (20.18 km)
- West end: SH 37 at the Texas state line in Albion, TX
- East end: US 70 Byp. in Idabel

Location
- Country: United States
- State: Oklahoma

Highway system
- Oklahoma State Highway System; Interstate; US; State; Turnpikes
← SH-36	→ SH-38

State Highway 37 (abbreviated SH-37) is a designation for two separate highways in the state of Oklahoma. The northern section runs between Hinton and Moore in central Oklahoma, while the southern section runs from the Texas state line at the Red River to Idabel, in southeastern Oklahoma. The northern section of SH-37 runs 65.8 miles (105.9 km) from US-281 in Hinton to Sunnylane Road (former SH-77H) in Moore. The southern section of SH-37 is 12.54 miles (20.18 km) long.

== Route descriptions ==
=== Central Oklahoma ===
The SH-37 in Central Oklahoma begins at US-281 in Hinton, Caddo County. It runs in a zigzag pattern for four miles (6.4 km) to the southeast before crossing into Canadian County. The Canadian County section runs in an irregular path to the southeast for 14 miles (23 km), before re-entering Caddo County.

Back in Caddo County, SH-37 runs three miles (5 km) south to the town of Cogar, where it joins SH-152 and turns to the east. This concurrency goes two miles (3 km) before entering Grady County.

In Grady County, SH-37/SH-152 goes 8.8 miles (14.2 km) to the east to US-81. There, SH-152 turns to the north, and SH-37 joins US-81 for a one-and-a-half-mile concurrency to Minco, where SH-37 splits off and heads east once again.

SH-37 runs for 16.6 miles (26.7 km) in Grady County, serving as the northern terminus for SH-92 on the west edge of Tuttle, and intersecting SH-4 in Tuttle before crossing into McClain County.

One mile into McClain County, SH-37 serves as the northern terminus for SH-76, then joins I-44 for a brief concurrency three miles later. SH-37 overlaps I-44 for three miles (5 km), running north across the Canadian River into Cleveland County and Oklahoma City, where it runs east along S.W. 134th Street into the city of Moore, where it becomes S. 4th Street. SH-37 then continues eastward as a mostly hidden designation through the south side of the city.

SH-37 ends at Sunnylane Road, formerly SH-77H, on the east side of Moore.

=== Southeastern Oklahoma ===
The southeastern SH-37 begins where TX-37 crosses the Red River into Oklahoma, and heads north for two miles (3 km) to a junction with SH-98. At this point, SH-37 heads east for 10 1/2 miles (16.9 km) to its terminus at US-70 Bypass in Idabel.

== History ==
=== Central Oklahoma ===
The portion of SH-37 in Moore between Janeway Avenue (just west of I-35) and its eastern terminus at Sunnylane Road was in the damage path of the EF-5 tornado that hit Moore on 20 May 2013.

=== Southeastern Oklahoma ===
The southeastern SH-37 was originally numbered as SH-57.

== Junction lists ==
=== Central Oklahoma ===
County	Location	mi	km	Exit	Destinations	Notes
Caddo	Hinton	0.0	0.0		US 281 / SH-8	Western terminus
Canadian	No major junctions					
Caddo	Cogar	21.2	34.1		SH-152	Western end of SH-152 concurrency
Grady		31.9	51.3		US 81 / SH-152	Eastern end of SH-152 concurrency, northern end of US-81 concurrency
Grady	Minco	33.3	53.6		US 81	Southern end of US-81 concurrency
Grady	Tuttle	41.3	66.5		SH-92	Northern terminus of SH-92
Grady		46.6	75.0		SH-4	
McClain	Newcastle	50.6	81.4		SH-76	Northern terminus of SH-76
McClain	Newcastle	53.6	86.3		I-44 / US 62	Interchange, I-44 exit 108, Southern end of I-44 / US-62 concurrency
McClain	Newcastle	54.9	88.4	108A	Frontage Road	Southbound exit and northbound entrance
Cleveland	Oklahoma City	56.2	90.4	109	SW 149th Street	
Cleveland	Oklahoma City	56.9	91.6		I-44 / US 62	Interchange, I-44 exit 110, Northern end of I-44 / US-62 concurrency
Cleveland	Moore	63.0	101.4		I-35 / US 77	Interchange, I-35 exit 117
Cleveland	Moore	65.8	105.9		Sunnylane Road	Eastern terminus; Road continues as SE 134th Street
1.000 mi = 1.609 km; 1.000 km = 0.621 mi: Concurrency terminus

=== Southeastern Oklahoma ===
The entire route is in McCurtain County.

Location	mi	km	Destinations	Notes
Red River	0.00	0.00	SH 37 south	Continuation into Texas
			SH-98 north – Valliant	
Idabel	12.54	20.18	US 70 Byp. (Jumper Memorial Highway)	Eastern terminus; road continues as Martin Luther King Drive
1.000 mi = 1.609 km; 1.000 km = 0.621 mi
