= Lookeba, Oklahoma =

Town in Oklahoma, US

- Town
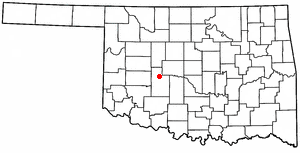
- Location of Lookeba, Oklahoma
- Coordinates: 35°21′47″N 98°21′50″W
- Country: United States
- State: Oklahoma
- County: Caddo

Area
  - Total: 0.25 sq mi (0.66 km^{2})
  - Land: 0.25 sq mi (0.66 km^{2})
  - Water: 0 sq mi (0.00 km^{2})
- Elevation: 1,335 ft (407 m)

Population (2020)
  - Total: 78
  - Density: 307.1/sq mi (118.56/km^{2})
- Time zone: UTC-6 (Central (CST))
  - Summer (DST): UTC-5 (CDT)
- ZIP code: 73053
- Area code: 405
- FIPS code: 40-44000
- GNIS feature ID: 2412913

Lookeba is a town in Caddo County, Oklahoma, United States. The population was 78 as of the 2020 United States census. Its name is a portmanteau of the names of three founding fathers: Lowe, Kelley and Baker. Lookeba is old enough to appear on a 1911 Rand McNally map of the county, located along the route of the old Rock Island railway.

== Geography ==
Lookeba is located in northern Caddo County. U.S. Route 281 passes just west of the town, leading north 12 miles (19 km) to Interstate 40, north of Hinton and south 4 miles (6 km) to Binger. Sugar Creek travels south-southeast past the east side of the community.

According to the United States Census Bureau, the town has a total area of 0.25 square miles (0.66 km^{2}), all land.

== Demographics ==
Historical population
Census	Pop.	Note	%±
1910	217		—
1920	240		10.6%
1930	312		30.0%
1940	279		−10.6%
1950	206		−26.2%
1960	158		−23.3%
1970	165		4.4%
1980	221		33.9%
1990	141		−36.2%
2000	131		−7.1%
2010	166		26.7%
2020	78		−53.0%
U.S. Decennial Census

=== 2020 census ===
As of the 2020 census, Lookeba had a population of 78. The median age was 40.5 years. 33.3% of residents were under the age of 18 and 12.8% of residents were 65 years of age or older. For every 100 females there were 100.0 males, and for every 100 females age 18 and over there were 100.0 males age 18 and over.

0.0% of residents lived in urban areas, while 100.0% lived in rural areas.

There were 29 households in Lookeba, of which 51.7% had children under the age of 18 living in them. Of all households, 62.1% were married-couple households, 13.8% were households with a male householder and no spouse or partner present, and 10.3% were households with a female householder and no spouse or partner present. About 13.8% of all households were made up of individuals and 3.4% had someone living alone who was 65 years of age or older.

There were 42 housing units, of which 31.0% were vacant. The homeowner vacancy rate was 8.3% and the rental vacancy rate was 0.0%.

Racial composition as of the 2020 census
Race	Number	Percent
White	54	69.2%
Black or African American	1	1.3%
American Indian and Alaska Native	4	5.1%
Asian	0	0.0%
Native Hawaiian and Other Pacific Islander	0	0.0%
Some other race	12	15.4%
Two or more races	7	9.0%
Hispanic or Latino (of any race)	20	25.6%

=== 2000 census ===
As of the 2000 census, there were 131 people, 45 households, and 34 families residing in the town. The population density was 517.8 inhabitants per square mile (199.9/km^{2}). There were 69 housing units at an average density of 272.7 per square mile (105.3/km^{2}). The racial makeup of the town was 74.81% White, 6.87% Native American, 15.27% from other races, and 3.05% from two or more races. Hispanic or Latino of any race were 19.85% of the population.

There were 45 households, out of which 33.3% had children under the age of 18 living with them, 53.3% were married couples living together, 15.6% had a female householder with no husband present, and 24.4% were non-families. 22.2% of all households were made up of individuals, and 13.3% had someone living alone who was 65 years of age or older. The average household size was 2.91 and the average family size was 3.47.

In the town, the population was spread out, with 31.3% under the age of 18, 13.7% from 18 to 24, 22.1% from 25 to 44, 16.8% from 45 to 64, and 16.0% who were 65 years of age or older. The median age was 30 years. For every 100 females, there were 95.5 males. For every 100 females age 18 and over, there were 87.5 males.

The median income for a household in the town was $20,000, and the median income for a family was $21,875. Males had a median income of $21,563 versus $25,000 for females. The per capita income for the town was $7,791. There were 27.8% of families and 33.1% of the population living below the poverty line, including 37.0% of under eighteens and 15.4% of those over 64.
