= Minnie Lou Bradley =

American cattlewoman (1931–2025)

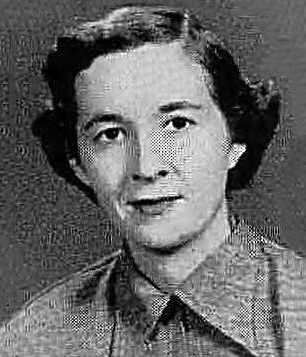
- Bradley in 1953
- Born: Minnie Lou Ottinger; December 15, 1931; Hinton, Oklahoma, U.S.
- Died: August 5, 2025 (aged 93)
- Education: Oklahoma State University
- Spouse: Bill Bradley (m. 1955)
- Children: 2

Minnie Lou Bradley (née Ottinger; December 15, 1931 – August 5, 2025) was an American rancher and cattlewoman. She was inducted into the National Cowgirl Museum and Hall of Fame in 2006. Bradley is considered an innovator in the beef cattle industry.

== Early life ==
Minnie Lou Bradley was born Minnie Lou Ottinger on December 15, 1931, in Hinton, Oklahoma. Her parents were Ralph Thomas Ottinger and Zulema Young Ottinger. She grew up on a wheat farm. Bradley wanted a book on livestock rather than girl toys. She performed chores such as cleaning chicken roosts to pay for it. Bradley was active in the local 4-H Club, where she showed Angus cattle, sheep, and swine. She was not able to join the Future Farmers of America then as it was male-only membership. Bradley was showing lambs at age 9. She won a blue ribbon at age 10 at the Oklahoma State Fair for sheep raised on her ranch. She received her first Angus cow at age 13. Bradley graduated from high school in Hydro, Oklahoma.

== Career ==
Bradley and her family owned and operated the Bradley 3 Ranch in Childress County, Texas. Bradley and a handful of women were first to earn a degree in animal husbandry from Oklahoma State University (formerly Oklahoma A&M). She was the first woman to join the Intercollegiate Livestock Judging Team. She was the first woman president of the American Angus Association. She was awarded many times by the agriculture industry in her long history for her contributions to the beef industry.

The first job Bradley had was working as an assistant to the executive secretary of the Texas Angus Association. She later worked for J. P. Walker of Angus Valley Farms in Tulsa, Oklahoma. In 1955, the year they were married, the Bradleys bought a 3,300 acre ranch with 20 cows near Childress that was co-owned with Billy Jack's parents. The combined property they named Bradley 3 Ranch. The two families ran it together for some time. Eventually, the ranch reached a size of 11,000 acres and usually ran 400 Angus-bred cattle. Minnie Lou became the head of the ranch. She also taught agriculture classes at Texas Christian University. Last reports showed that Billy Jack was living in Vernon, Texas, and Minnie Lou, her daughter and her son-in-law were running Bradley 3 Ranch. Minnie Lou and Billy Jack's son had died earlier. Bradley was recognized for work of the Angus breed, her success in crossbreeding Angus and Hereford cattle. She was inducted into the National Cowgirl Museum and Hall of Fame in 2006. In 2014, her portrait was unveiled to be displayed in the Saddle and Sirloin Gallery in Louisville, Kentucky.

== Personal life and death ==
Minnie Lou Ottinger married Bill Bradley in 1955. They raised one son and one daughter together.

Minnie Lou Bradley died following a brief illness on August 5, 2025, at the age of 93.
