= Sherri Hill =

American fashion designer

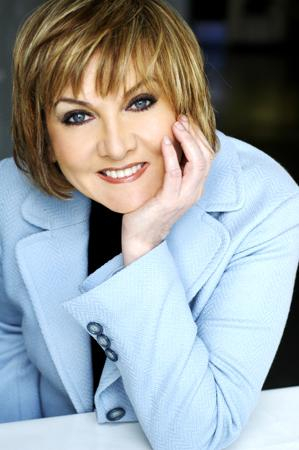
- Born: 1949 (age 76–77); Minco, Oklahoma, U.S.
- Label: Sherri Hill
- Spouse: Charles Hill
- Children: 4
- Website: www.sherrihill.com

Sherri Hill (born Sherri Branum; 1949) is an American fashion designer and businesswoman who specializes in formal evening wear.

== Early years ==
Sherri Branum, known professionally as Sherri Hill, is one of five children born to James and Roberta Branum. She was born and raised in Minco, Oklahoma. Hill's parents owned local general stores and she was given the opportunity at age eight to join her older sisters in part-time work at the family store. The colorful fabric that was sold in the store sparked Hill's interest in fashion and she was eventually allowed to “dress” the four mannequins in the front windows by draping yards of fabric around each one.

While Hill was studying fashion design at the University of Oklahoma, her family opened stores in Norman and Oklahoma City where they focused on ladies’ clothing and evening wear. It was during these years that Hill began designing her own line of evening gowns.

== Career ==
After graduating from the University of Oklahoma, Hill worked for various manufacturers in the evening wear business. She started gaining recognition in the pageant world when various Miss America, Miss USA and Miss Universe contestants won competitions in gowns she had designed. Along with designing pageant gowns, Hill worked for 12 years as designer for Jovani Fashions, helping launch the brand. In 2008, she left Jovani to begin her evening gown line under the name Sherri Hill, Inc.

Various celebrities have worn Hill's designs for red carpet, charity and social events. One of the dresses of the Sherri Hill brand, style 1403, was worn by Selena Gomez while performing in a 2011 concert. Kendall Jenner and Nicole Polizzi are also fans.

Hill was on Google's annual "Year in Search" results for the top-trending fashion designers in 2014.

== New York Fashion Week ==
In 2011, Sherri Hill debuted at New York Fashion Week in the Trump Tower. This was Kendall Jenner's first runway show.

World-famous model Carmen Dell’Orefice also walked the 2011 Sherri Hill runway, as well as Miss China 2011 Luo Zilin, and Miss USA 2011 Alyssa Campanella.

In September 2012, Hill debuted her Spring 2013 collection at New York Fashion Week in the Trump Tower, with Kendall and Kylie Jenner, and Miss Universe 2008 Dayana Mendoza on the runway.

At the 2013 New York Fashion Week, Sherri Hill held an 'Evening By Sherri Hill' show at the Trump Tower. Hill debuted her new prom and couture collections in front of several celebrities, including the Duck Dynasty family. Sadie Robertson, the 16-year-old daughter of Willie Robertson of Duck Commander, walked in the runway show modeling the 'Sadie Robertson Live Original' range.

== Television appearances ==
Keeping Up with the Kardashians (2011) as herself (Season 6, Episode 2):

== Anti-counterfeit work ==
On June 20, 2012, Hill made public her success in a lawsuit against online counterfeiters. She was awarded $5,000,000 in the case against the two defendants that were accused of selling hundreds of fake gowns under the Sherri Hill pretense. After winning the legal battle in 2012, the company has hired staff devoted to reporting violations of copyright laws via the Internet. According to Manhattan federal court papers, not only has Sherri Hill alleged that knock-offs of her dresses are poorly constructed, uncomfortable to wear, and made of inferior materials, but also that one particular knock-off was constructed in such a way that it “makes the customers appear heavier around the waist and hips.”
