= Stecker, Oklahoma =

Unincorporated community in Oklahoma, US

- Unincorporated community
- Location within Oklahoma
- Coordinates: 34°57′27″N 98°18′57″W
- Country: United States
- State: Oklahoma
- County: Caddo
- Elevation: 1,352 ft (412 m)
- Time zone: UTC-6 (Central (CST))
  - Summer (DST): UTC-5 (CDT)
- Area code: 580
- GNIS feature ID: 1098511

Stecker is an unincorporated community in Caddo County, Oklahoma, United States, located 5 miles (8.0 km) northeast of Apache. Stecker is old enough to appear on a 1911 Rand McNally map of the county, situated along the route of the old Rock Island railway.
