= Eakly, Oklahoma =

Town in Oklahoma, US

- Town
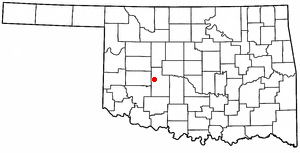
- Location of Eakly, Oklahoma
- Coordinates: 35°18′19″N 98°33′22″W
- Country: United States
- State: Oklahoma
- County: Caddo

Area
  - Total: 0.26 sq mi (0.68 km^{2})
  - Land: 0.26 sq mi (0.68 km^{2})
  - Water: 0 sq mi (0.00 km^{2})
- Elevation: 1,483 ft (452 m)

Population (2020)
  - Total: 293
  - Density: 1,119.0/sq mi (432.03/km^{2})
- Time zone: UTC-6 (Central (CST))
  - Summer (DST): UTC-5 (CDT)
- ZIP code: 73033
- Area codes: 405/572
- FIPS code: 40-22400
- GNIS feature ID: 2412457

Eakly is a town in Caddo County, Oklahoma, United States. As of the 2020 census, Eakly had a population of 293.

== History ==
A post office was established in the community of Eakly in March 1902, while this area was still part of Oklahoma Territory. Apparently, a plat was not filed for the town until the 1920s, which meant that town lots could not be sold during the first two decades of Eakly's formal existence. Two organizations were exempted from this limit: the Methodist church bought a building site in 1914, and the Bank of Eakly bought a site in 1920. All others who wished to build in the town had to lease the land.

Eakly's first census was in 1940, showing 231 residents. The population dropped somewhat during World War II, and registered 191 in 1950, probably because people moved to military service and war production work in larger towns and cities. There was an upswing in 1960 and 1970, which peaked at 452 by 1980. The count dropped to 277 in 1990, and has never again approached the 1980 high.

The lack of a registered town plat and the lack of a railroad did not prevent Eakly from prospering as an agricultural center. Cotton farming was the main activity in early decades. After World War II, irrigation began to spread into this part of Oklahoma, enabling more diverse crops. Peanut farming became the leading agricultural activity in the 1960s. The community incorporated as a town in 1957. A house manufacturing plant was built in 1970, but soon went out of business.

In 1999, the Eakly school system decided to end its 78-year existence and merge into the system at Hydro, approximately 12 miles (19 km) north. The closing was attributed to a 1990 state educational reform law that promised financial incentives to small school districts that agreed to consolidate. The surviving district in this case will be known as the Hydro-Eakly District

== Geography ==
Eakly is located in northwestern Caddo County. It is one mile northeast of the intersection of state highways 58 and 152, and 17 miles (27 km) south of Interstate 40 on State Highway 58.

According to the United States Census Bureau, the town has a total area of 0.26 square miles (0.67 km^{2}), all land.

Eakly is less than 19 miles from Fort Cobb State Park on Fort Cobb Reservoir.

== Demographics ==
Historical population
Census	Pop.	Note	%±
1940	231		—
1950	191		−17.3%
1960	217		13.6%
1970	228		5.1%
1980	452		98.2%
1990	277		−38.7%
2000	276		−0.4%
2010	338		22.5%
2020	293		−13.3%
U.S. Decennial Census

=== 2020 census ===
As of the 2020 census, Eakly had a population of 293. The median age was 36.1 years. 26.6% of residents were under the age of 18 and 18.8% of residents were 65 years of age or older. For every 100 females there were 84.3 males, and for every 100 females age 18 and over there were 82.2 males age 18 and over.

0.0% of residents lived in urban areas, while 100.0% lived in rural areas.

There were 101 households in Eakly, of which 32.7% had children under the age of 18 living in them. Of all households, 52.5% were married-couple households, 14.9% were households with a male householder and no spouse or partner present, and 26.7% were households with a female householder and no spouse or partner present. About 24.7% of all households were made up of individuals and 11.9% had someone living alone who was 65 years of age or older.

There were 115 housing units, of which 12.2% were vacant. The homeowner vacancy rate was 1.4% and the rental vacancy rate was 8.3%.

Racial composition as of the 2020 census
Race	Number	Percent
White	177	60.4%
Black or African American	0	0.0%
American Indian and Alaska Native	3	1.0%
Asian	1	0.3%
Native Hawaiian and Other Pacific Islander	0	0.0%
Some other race	89	30.4%
Two or more races	23	7.8%
Hispanic or Latino (of any race)	117	39.9%

=== 2010 census ===
As of the census of 2010, there were 338 people living in the town. The population density was 1,300 inhabitants per square mile (500/km^{2}). There were 140 housing units at an average density of 543 per square mile (210/km^{2}). The racial makeup of the town was 80.07% White, 4.71% Native American, 14.13% from other races, and 1.09% from two or more races. Hispanic or Latino of any race were 13.77% of the population.

There were 119 households in the town, out of which 25.9% had children under the age of 18 living with them, 58.0% were married couples living together, 10.7% had a female householder with no husband present, and 26.8% were non-families. 23.2% of all households were made up of individuals, and 14.3% had someone living alone who was 65 years of age or older. The average household size was 2.46 and the average family size was 2.87.

In the town, the population was spread out, with 23.2% under the age of 18, 11.2% from 18 to 24, 20.3% from 25 to 44, 26.4% from 45 to 64, and 18.8% who were 65 years of age or older. The median age was 41 years. For every 100 females, there were 90.3 males. For every 100 females age 18 and over, there were 94.5 males.

The median income for a household in the town was $27,500, and the median income for a family was $32,000. Males had a median income of $22,500 versus $15,000 for females. The per capita income for the town was $15,383. About 12.8% of families and 15.3% of the population were below the poverty line, including 18.2% of those under the age of eighteen and 18.4% of those 65 or over.

== Education ==
The school district is Hydro-Eakly Public Schools.

== Notable people ==
- Mike Moore, baseball player
