= Caddo County, Oklahoma =

County in Oklahoma, United States

- County
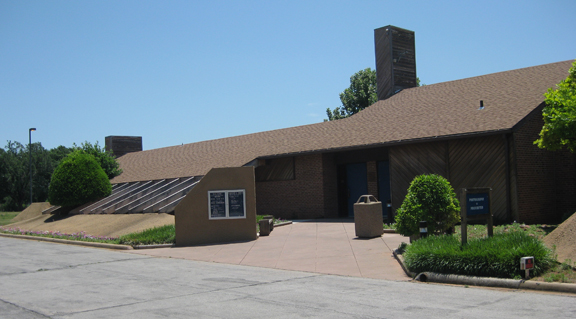
- The Southern Plains Indian Museum in Anadarko

- Location within the U.S. state of Oklahoma
- Coordinates: 35°11′N 98°23′W
- Country: United States
- State: Oklahoma
- Founded: August 6, 1901
- Named for: Caddo Tribe
- Seat: Anadarko
- Largest city: Anadarko

Area
  - Total: 1,290 sq mi (3,300 km^{2})
  - Land: 1,278 sq mi (3,310 km^{2})
  - Water: 12 sq mi (31 km^{2}) 0.9%

Population (2020)
  - Total: 26,945
  - Estimate (2025): 26,130 ▼
  - Density: 21.08/sq mi (8.140/km^{2})
- Time zone: UTC−6 (Central)
  - Summer (DST): UTC−5 (CDT)
- Congressional district: 3rd

Caddo County is a county located in the U.S. state of Oklahoma. As of the 2020 census, the population was 26,945. Its county seat is Anadarko. Created in 1901 as part of Oklahoma Territory, the county is named for the Caddo tribe who were settled here on a reservation in the 1870s. Caddo County is immediately west of the seven-county Greater Oklahoma City metro area, and although is not officially in the metro area, it has many economic ties in this region.

== History ==
Caddo County was organized on August 6, 1901, when the Federal Government allotted the Kiowa, Comanche, and Arapaho reservations and sold the surplus land to white settlers. The reservation land was part of Oklahoma Territory until Oklahoma became a state on November 16, 1907. Part of its land was taken at statehood to form neighboring Grady County. Some additional land was taken in 1911 and also awarded to Grady County.

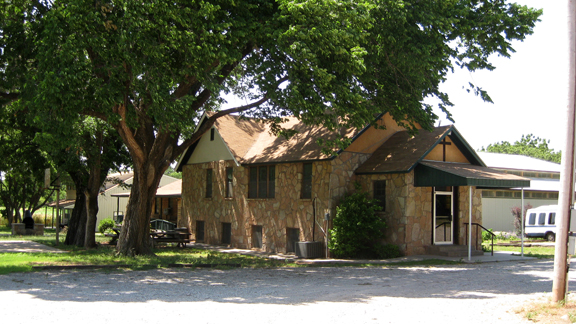
Redstone Baptist Church, north of the Apache Wye, Caddo County, Kiowa mission founded in the 19th century.

Agriculture has been the mainstay of the local economy since its founding. The main crops were cotton, corn, wheat, alfalfa, broom corn, and kaffir corn. Poultry and livestock production have also been important. By 1960, Caddo County ranked first in Oklahoma for producing of peanuts, hogs and poultry.

The first oil field (Cement Field) in the county was discovered in 1911, and oil production has remained important to the county economy since then. Smaller-scale booms in oil production occurred in the 1960s, 1970s and 1980s.

== Geography ==
According to the U.S. Census Bureau, the county has a total area of 1,290 square miles (3,300 km^{2}), of which 1,278 square miles (3,310 km^{2}) is land and 12 square miles (31 km^{2}) (0.9%) is water. The county mostly lies in the Gypsum Hills and the Red Bed plains physiographic areas. The extreme southwestern corner is in the Wichita Mountains. The county is drained by the Washita River, Pond Creek and Sugar Creek. Major reservoirs are Chickasha Lake, Ellsworth Lake, and Fort Cobb Lake, Red Rock Canyon State Park near Hinton is notable for having the only remaining stand of native Caddo maple trees.

=== Major highways ===
- Interstate 40
- Interstate 44
- H.E. Bailey Turnpike
- U.S. Highway 62
- U.S. Highway 281
- U.S. Highway 277
- State Highway 8
- State Highway 9
- State Highway 19
- State Highway 58

=== Adjacent counties ===
- Blaine County (north)
- Canadian County (northeast)
- Grady County (east)
- Comanche County (south)
- Kiowa County (southwest)
- Washita County (west)
- Custer County (northwest)

== Demographics ==
Historical population
Census	Pop.	Note	%±
1910	35,685		—
1920	34,207		−4.1%
1930	50,779		48.4%
1940	41,567		−18.1%
1950	34,913		−16.0%
1960	28,621		−18.0%
1970	28,931		1.1%
1980	30,905		6.8%
1990	29,550		−4.4%
2000	30,150		2.0%
2010	29,600		−1.8%
2020	26,945		−9.0%
2025 (est.)	26,130	▼	−3.0%
U.S. Decennial Census; 1790-1960 1900-1990; 1990-2000 2010

=== 2020 census ===
As of the 2020 census, the county had a population of 26,945. Of the residents, 21.8% were under the age of 18 and 17.5% were 65 years of age or older; the median age was 40.1 years. For every 100 females there were 125.2 males, and for every 100 females age 18 and over there were 130.9 males.

The racial makeup of the county was 62.1% White, 2.6% Black or African American, 21.4% American Indian and Alaska Native, 0.3% Asian, 3.8% from some other race, and 9.8% from two or more races. Hispanic or Latino residents of any race comprised 16.1% of the population.

There were 9,284 households in the county, of which 31.5% had children under the age of 18 living with them and 28.2% had a female householder with no spouse or partner present. About 27.8% of all households were made up of individuals and 14.3% had someone living alone who was 65 years of age or older.

There were 11,544 housing units, of which 19.6% were vacant. Among occupied housing units, 72.4% were owner-occupied and 27.6% were renter-occupied. The homeowner vacancy rate was 2.6% and the rental vacancy rate was 11.0%.

=== 2000 census ===
As of the census of 2000, there were 30,150 people, 10,957 households, and 7,965 families residing in the county. The population density was 9/km^{2} (23/mi^{2}). There were 13,096 housing units at an average density of 4/km^{2} (10/mi^{2}). The racial makeup of the county was 65.55% White, 2.92% Black or African American, 24.28% Native American, 0.17% Asian, 0.02% Pacific Islander, 2.70% from other races, and 4.36% from two or more races. 6.28% of the population were Hispanic or Latino of any race. 93.8% spoke English, 4.5% Spanish and 1.2% Kiowa as their first language.

There were 10,957 households, out of which 33.30% had children under the age of 18 living with them, 55.20% were married couples living together, 13.00% had a female householder with no husband present, and 27.30% were non-families. 24.80% of all households were made up of individuals, and 12.50% had someone living alone who was 65 years of age or older. The average household size was 2.62 and the average family size was 3.13.

In the county, the population was spread out, with 28.50% under the age of 18, 8.50% from 18 to 24, 26.00% from 25 to 44, 22.10% from 45 to 64, and 14.90% who were 65 years of age or older. The median age was 36 years. For every 100 females there were 98.60 males. For every 100 females age 18 and over, there were 96.00 males.

The median income for a household in the county was $27,347, and the median income for a family was $32,118. Males had a median income of $26,373 versus $18,658 for females. The per capita income for the county was $13,298. About 16.70% of families and 21.70% of the population were below the poverty line, including 28.00% of those under age 18 and 15.90% of those age 65 or over.

== Politics ==
During the 20th century, Caddo County was a bellwether county: between 1908 and 2004, the county voted for the winner in every election but 1908, 1956, 1960 and 1988. However, while Democrats had a large plurality of registered voters through the 2010s, the county has recently been swept up in the growing Republican trend throughout Oklahoma. John McCain (2008), Mitt Romney (2012) and Donald Trump (2016) each received at least 64% of the county's vote.

Voter Registration and Party Enrollment as of May 31, 2023
Party	Number of Voters	Percentage
Democratic	4,998	36.13%
Republican	6,635	47.96%
Others	2,202	15.91%
Total	13,835	100%

United States presidential election results for Caddo County, Oklahoma
Year	Republican		Democratic		Third party(ies)	
Year	No.	%	No.	%	No.	%
1908	2,860	45.69%	2,964	47.36%	435	6.95%
1912	2,413	40.37%	2,514	42.06%	1,050	17.57%
1916	2,272	36.76%	2,735	44.25%	1,174	18.99%
1920	4,823	53.17%	3,594	39.62%	654	7.21%
1924	4,388	46.04%	4,211	44.19%	931	9.77%
1928	7,313	64.27%	3,885	34.14%	180	1.58%
1932	2,972	21.27%	11,001	78.73%	0	0.00%
1936	5,205	35.48%	9,358	63.79%	106	0.72%
1940	6,304	43.05%	8,280	56.54%	61	0.42%
1944	5,529	44.58%	6,850	55.23%	24	0.19%
1948	3,793	31.87%	8,110	68.13%	0	0.00%
1952	6,834	52.62%	6,153	47.38%	0	0.00%
1956	5,331	47.53%	5,884	52.47%	0	0.00%
1960	5,920	53.65%	5,115	46.35%	0	0.00%
1964	3,724	33.34%	7,447	66.66%	0	0.00%
1968	4,712	43.70%	4,212	39.07%	1,858	17.23%
1972	7,683	70.41%	2,921	26.77%	308	2.82%
1976	3,854	34.02%	7,382	65.17%	91	0.80%
1980	5,945	54.07%	4,695	42.70%	355	3.23%
1984	6,811	60.06%	4,463	39.35%	67	0.59%
1988	4,689	46.07%	5,387	52.93%	101	0.99%
1992	3,664	31.89%	4,861	42.31%	2,963	25.79%
1996	3,422	35.39%	4,844	50.09%	1,404	14.52%
2000	4,835	52.50%	4,272	46.38%	103	1.12%
2004	6,491	62.37%	3,916	37.63%	0	0.00%
2008	6,413	65.33%	3,404	34.67%	0	0.00%
2012	5,687	64.25%	3,164	35.75%	0	0.00%
2016	6,482	69.34%	2,420	25.89%	446	4.77%
2020	7,013	71.13%	2,670	27.08%	176	1.79%
2024	6,886	72.51%	2,414	25.42%	196	2.06%

== Economy ==
Caddo County is home to cattle ranching and significant wheat and peanut farm operations—with a few of the producers practicing environmentally friendly no-till or reduced tillage farming methods.

There is also one winery and vineyard in the county (Woods and Waters Winery and Vineyard).

== Communities ==
=== City ===
- Anadarko (county seat)

=== Towns ===
- Apache
- Binger
- Bridgeport
- Carnegie
- Cement
- Cyril
- Eakly
- Fort Cobb
- Gracemont
- Hinton
- Hydro
- Lookeba

=== Census-designated place ===
- Washita

=== Unincorporated communities ===
- Albert
- Alden
- Alfalfa
- Boone
- Broxton
- Cogar
- Nowhere
- Pine Ridge
- Scott
- Sickles
- Spring Creek
- Stecker

== Education ==
Public school districts:

- Anadarko Public Schools
- Binger-Oney Public Schools
- Boone-Apache Public Schools
- Carnegie Public Schools
- Cement Public Schools
- Cordell Public Schools
- Cyril Public Schools
- Fletcher Public Schools
- Fort Cobb-Broxton Schools
- Gracemont Public Schools
- Hinton Public Schools
- Hydro-Eakly Public Schools
- Lookeba-Sickles Public Schools
- Minco Public Schools
- Verden Public Schools
- Pioneer Public School (elementary school only)

There is also a Bureau of Indian Education (BIE)-operated school, Riverside Indian School.

== NRHP sites ==
The following sites in Caddo County are listed on the National Register of Historic Places:

- Amphlett Brothers Drug and Jewelry Store, Apache
- Anadarko Armory, Anadarko
- Anadarko Downtown Historic District, Anadarko
- Apache State Bank, Apache
- Bridgeport Bridge, Bridgeport
- Bridgeport Hill-Hydro Route 66 Segment, Hydro
- Caddo County Medicine Creek Archeological District Binger
- First Baptist Church (Colored), Anadarko
- Fort Cobb Site, Fort Cobb
- Provine Service Station, Hydro
- Randlett Park, Anadarko
- Rock Island Passenger Station, Anadarko
- Rock Mary, Hinton
- Stevens Rock Shelter, Gracemont

== See also ==
- Tropical Storm Erin (2007)
