= Jovani Fashion =

Fashion house focusing on the prom and evening wear sectors

Jovani
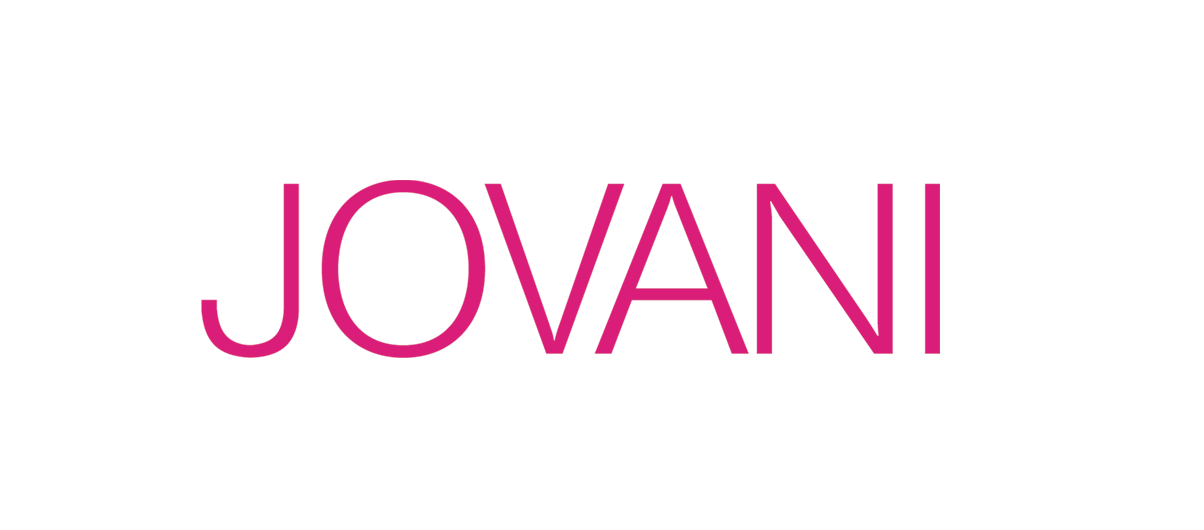
- Industry: Fashion
- Founded: 1983
- Founder: Jacob Maslavi [wd]
- Headquarters: 42 W. 39th Street, New York City, New York 10018
- Key people: Saul Maslavi, CEO; Abraham Maslavi [wd], CFO; Nazy Rafaeil, CMO; Julie DuRocher, Designer
- Products: clothing, textiles, dresses
- Website: www.jovani.com

Jovani Fashion is a fashion house focusing on the prom and evening wear sectors. It was founded in 1983 in New York City.

== History and operations ==
Jovani Fashion was founded in 1983 by Jacob Maslavi and his sons, Abraham and Saul Maslavi.

In 2007, Julie DuRocher was named as the new head designer for Jovani. DuRocher presented a 14-piece Jovani couture collection at a runway show held at the 2012 Brooklyn Fashion Week.

In 2014, Jovani creations were featured at Mercedes-Benz Fashion Week in Russia. The 60-piece collection shown helped introduce the brand to the Russian market.

Jovani Fashion remains family owned and has grown to a 50-person company. Its retailers include Neiman Marcus. In September 2023, Jovani made its New York Fashion Week debut with a runway show at The Glasshouse, unveiling the brand's first ready-to-wear and couture collections to mark its 40th anniversary. In April 2024, Jovani debuted its first sustainable bridal collection at the Empire State Building during New York Fashion Week Bridal, featuring gowns made from fabrics crafted from ocean-bound plastics.

== Celebrity and editorial appearances ==
In 2024, Jovani Fashion partnered with the Miss America competition as the official fashion sponsor. The company provided dresses for the opening number of the Miss America and Miss America's Teen delegates.

Jovani is also the official fashion sponsor for the Miss USA Organization, providing evening gowns and wardrobe support to state titleholders competing at the national level.

Celebrities including Miranda Lambert, Carrie Underwood, Selena Gomez, Ariana Grande, Taylor Swift and Jewel, have all worn Jovani's signature pieces for various red carpet, charity, and social events. In 2014, Jovani dresses worn by country music star Miranda Lambert were exhibited in The Country Music Hall of Fame in Nashville, Tennessee.

The Jovani collections have had editorial exposure in publications such as WWD and have also been featured on prime-time television shows such as The Voice.

Kim Kardashian wore a Jovani dress in the January 2012 issue of Glamour magazine.

In 2014, X Factor's Fifth Harmony was chosen to front the brand's 2014 campaign. The powerhouse group agreed to represent the Jovani 2014 prom line. They also participated in a contest in which the group performed at the winner's prom.

In April 2015, Persian singer Googoosh wore a Jovani evening dress during her concert in Montreal Canada.

Singer Ciara wore a couture Jovani gown for her appearance at the Vanity Fair Oscar Party in 2017.

On June 13, 2019, Real Housewife of New York, Luann De Lesseps, released a music track "Feelin' Jovani".

Luann de Lesseps, star of Real Housewives of New York City, has a longstanding relationship with Jovani, frequently wearing their designs for her cabaret performances and public appearances.

== Charity ==
In 2013, Jovani partnered with the non-profit organisation Operation PROM to provide prom dresses to underprivileged high school students.

Jovani also makes in kind donations to the Society of Memorial Sloan-Kettering Cancer Center, which are used at the annual Pediatric Prom.

In 2017, Jovani donated enough prom dresses for every high school girl to choose her own prom dress in the Yonkers school district in NY.
