= 1972 United States presidential election in Oklahoma =

- November 7, 1972

Nominee	Richard Nixon	George McGovern
Party	Republican	Democratic
Home state	California	South Dakota
Running mate	Spiro Agnew	Sargent Shriver
Electoral vote	8	0
Popular vote	759,025	247,147
Percentage	73.70%	24.00%
County results
Nixon
60–70%
70–80%
80–90%
President before election
Richard Nixon
Republican
Elected President
Richard Nixon
Republican

The 1972 United States presidential election in Oklahoma was held on November 7, 1972, as part of the 1972 United States presidential election. Voters chose eight electors, or representatives to the Electoral College, who voted for president and vice president.

Oklahoma voted in a landslide for incumbent Republican President Richard Nixon over his Democratic challenger George McGovern. Nixon's winning margin of 49.70 percentage points made Oklahoma his third-strongest state, behind Mississippi and Georgia, and 26.55 percentage points more Republican than the nation at-large. Although in the twenty-first century Oklahoma has rivaled Wyoming, Utah, Idaho and increasingly West Virginia as the most Republican state in the nation, no presidential candidate in Oklahoma has ever equaled Nixon's margin of victory. Indeed, in the thirteen presidential elections since this one, only twice has any state been carried by a larger percentage margin – both by Ronald Reagan in Utah, as part of the 1980 and 1984 elections.

Nixon won with over 60% of the vote in all 77 counties in the state, four years after he had won Oklahoma despite finishing behind both Democrat Hubert Humphrey and American Independent George Wallace in Atoka, Choctaw, Love, McCurtain and Pushmataha counties. American Independent John G. Schmitz was the only other candidate on the ballot, and he received 2.30 percent of the vote, although managing over eleven percent in the Panhandle county of Cimarron. Nixon's feat of winning every county in Oklahoma would not be achieved by any presidential candidate again until George W. Bush did so in 2004, since when every county has stayed in the GOP column in presidential elections. This was the last time until 2004 that Hughes County and Haskell County voted Republican in a presidential election. Carter, Cotton, Harmon, Jackson, Jefferson, Murray, and Tillman counties voted Republican for the first time since 1928; Bryan, Choctaw, Coal, Johnston, McCurtain, and Love counties for the first time ever; and Latimer and Pittsburg counties since 1920.

In archconservative Oklahoma, McGovern was uniformly viewed as a left-wing extremist because of his support for busing and civil rights, plus his opposition to the Vietnam War, support for granting amnesty to draft dodgers and support for a thousand-dollar giveaway to each American as a solution to poverty. Many, especially Republican campaigners, also believed McGovern would legalise abortion and illicit drugs if he were elected – despite the fact that his running mate Sargent Shriver was firmly anti-abortion.

Consequently, even the most loyal Southern Democrats from the southeastern part of the state almost completely deserted their traditional party for Nixon: Bryan, Coal, Johnston, and the above-mentioned Choctaw, Love and McCurtain counties deserted their traditional Democratic Party for the first time ever. Nixon also almost completely captured the twenty percent of Oklahoman voters who had supported Wallace in 1968: exit polls suggested he won them over McGovern by a ratio of ten to one, and in the two Wallace counties of Pushmataha and Atoka Nixon totaled over seventy percent of the vote which increased from around thirty percent in 1968.

== Results ==
1972 United States presidential election in Oklahoma
Party	Candidate	Votes	Percentage	Electoral votes
Republican	Richard Nixon (incumbent)	759,025	73.70%	8
Democratic	George McGovern	247,147	24.00%	0
American Independent	John G. Schmitz	23,728	2.30%	0
Totals		1,029,900	100.00%	9
Voter turnout				—

=== Results by county ===
County	Richard Nixon Republican		George McGovern Democratic		John G. Schmitz American Independent		Margin		Total votes cast
County	#	%	#	%	#	%	#	%	Total votes cast
Adair	4,720	73.12%	1,601	24.80%	134	2.08%	3,119	48.32%	6,455
Alfalfa	3,208	81.48%	641	16.28%	88	2.24%	2,567	65.20%	3,937
Atoka	2,905	72.86%	993	24.91%	89	2.23%	1,912	47.95%	3,987
Beaver	2,562	80.41%	522	16.38%	102	3.20%	2,040	64.03%	3,186
Beckham	4,472	71.72%	1,608	25.79%	155	2.49%	2,864	45.93%	6,235
Blaine	3,958	77.73%	963	18.91%	171	3.36%	2,995	58.82%	5,092
Bryan	5,397	61.91%	3,144	36.06%	177	2.03%	2,253	25.85%	8,718
Caddo	7,683	70.41%	2,921	26.77%	308	2.82%	4,762	43.64%	10,912
Canadian	11,400	78.28%	2,751	18.89%	413	2.84%	8,649	59.39%	14,564
Carter	9,368	66.41%	4,577	32.45%	161	1.14%	4,791	33.96%	14,106
Cherokee	7,080	69.37%	2,899	28.40%	227	2.22%	4,181	40.97%	10,206
Choctaw	3,399	64.40%	1,798	34.07%	81	1.53%	1,601	30.33%	5,278
Cimarron	1,350	71.62%	323	17.14%	212	11.25%	1,027	54.48%	1,885
Cleveland	25,777	68.71%	11,126	29.66%	615	1.64%	14,651	39.05%	37,518
Coal	1,461	67.05%	680	31.21%	38	1.74%	781	35.84%	2,179
Comanche	19,759	79.85%	4,559	18.42%	427	1.73%	15,200	61.43%	24,745
Cotton	2,050	70.23%	798	27.34%	71	2.43%	1,252	42.89%	2,919
Craig	4,163	70.36%	1,642	27.75%	112	1.89%	2,521	42.61%	5,917
Creek	12,396	75.11%	3,705	22.45%	402	2.44%	8,691	52.66%	16,503
Custer	7,267	74.30%	2,298	23.50%	215	2.20%	4,969	50.80%	9,780
Delaware	5,476	70.30%	2,135	27.41%	178	2.29%	3,341	42.89%	7,789
Dewey	2,106	74.79%	626	22.23%	84	2.98%	1,480	52.56%	2,816
Ellis	2,059	77.76%	473	17.86%	116	4.38%	1,586	59.90%	2,648
Garfield	19,348	79.07%	4,557	18.62%	564	2.30%	14,791	60.45%	24,469
Garvin	7,245	70.72%	2,685	26.21%	315	3.07%	4,560	44.51%	10,245
Grady	7,762	67.50%	3,440	29.92%	297	2.58%	4,322	37.58%	11,499
Grant	2,829	75.34%	805	21.44%	121	3.22%	2,024	53.90%	3,755
Greer	2,154	66.40%	1,004	30.95%	86	2.65%	1,150	35.45%	3,244
Harmon	1,319	68.38%	568	29.45%	42	2.18%	751	38.93%	1,929
Harper	1,976	79.84%	385	15.56%	114	4.61%	1,591	64.28%	2,475
Haskell	2,815	63.12%	1,408	31.57%	237	5.31%	1,407	31.55%	4,460
Hughes	3,497	64.86%	1,787	33.14%	108	2.00%	1,710	31.72%	5,392
Jackson	5,519	71.61%	2,054	26.65%	134	1.74%	3,465	44.96%	7,707
Jefferson	1,709	62.12%	969	35.22%	73	2.65%	740	26.90%	2,751
Johnston	2,205	67.72%	983	30.19%	68	2.09%	1,222	37.53%	3,256
Kay	17,244	78.44%	4,246	19.31%	494	2.25%	12,998	59.13%	21,984
Kingfisher	4,861	81.90%	912	15.37%	162	2.73%	3,949	66.53%	5,935
Kiowa	3,711	69.81%	1,495	28.12%	110	2.07%	2,216	41.69%	5,316
Latimer	2,520	64.80%	1,239	31.86%	130	3.34%	1,281	32.94%	3,889
LeFlore	7,932	67.45%	3,433	29.19%	394	3.35%	4,499	38.26%	11,759
Lincoln	6,512	74.98%	1,919	22.10%	254	2.92%	4,593	52.88%	8,685
Logan	6,543	68.85%	2,760	29.04%	200	2.10%	3,783	39.81%	9,503
Love	1,407	66.75%	671	31.83%	30	1.42%	736	34.92%	2,108
McClain	4,241	73.16%	1,350	23.29%	206	3.55%	2,891	49.87%	5,797
McCurtain	6,441	70.20%	2,568	27.99%	166	1.81%	3,873	42.21%	9,175
McIntosh	3,216	63.89%	1,686	33.49%	132	2.62%	1,530	30.40%	5,034
Major	3,203	83.89%	512	13.41%	103	2.70%	2,691	70.48%	3,818
Marshall	2,273	65.37%	1,113	32.01%	91	2.62%	1,160	33.36%	3,477
Mayes	7,535	72.08%	2,656	25.41%	263	2.52%	4,879	46.67%	10,454
Murray	2,983	68.23%	1,294	29.60%	95	2.17%	1,689	38.63%	4,372
Muskogee	15,161	65.65%	7,380	31.96%	551	2.39%	7,781	33.69%	23,092
Noble	4,085	78.38%	999	19.17%	128	2.46%	3,086	59.21%	5,212
Nowata	3,293	72.61%	1,096	24.17%	146	3.22%	2,197	48.44%	4,535
Okfuskee	2,862	66.73%	1,328	30.96%	99	2.31%	1,534	35.77%	4,289
Oklahoma	156,437	75.24%	46,986	22.60%	4,502	2.17%	109,451	52.64%	207,925
Okmulgee	8,706	63.82%	4,494	32.94%	442	3.24%	4,212	30.88%	13,642
Osage	9,288	73.77%	2,968	23.57%	335	2.66%	6,320	50.20%	12,591
Ottawa	8,348	68.63%	3,657	30.07%	158	1.30%	4,691	38.56%	12,163
Pawnee	4,280	77.30%	1,135	20.50%	122	2.20%	3,145	56.80%	5,537
Payne	17,019	73.77%	5,644	24.46%	407	1.76%	11,375	49.31%	23,070
Pittsburg	9,989	66.42%	4,748	31.57%	303	2.01%	5,241	34.85%	15,040
Pontotoc	8,762	72.04%	3,160	25.98%	240	1.97%	5,602	46.06%	12,162
Pottawatomie	13,308	71.30%	4,822	25.84%	534	2.86%	8,486	45.46%	18,664
Pushmataha	2,456	68.24%	1,016	28.23%	127	3.53%	1,440	40.01%	3,599
Roger Mills	1,696	78.16%	420	19.35%	54	2.49%	1,276	58.81%	2,170
Rogers	9,697	76.19%	2,607	20.48%	424	3.33%	7,090	55.71%	12,728
Seminole	6,879	70.02%	2,746	27.95%	199	2.03%	4,133	42.07%	9,824
Sequoyah	6,842	71.64%	2,519	26.37%	190	1.99%	4,323	45.27%	9,551
Stephens	10,309	71.61%	3,623	25.17%	464	3.22%	6,686	46.44%	14,396
Texas	5,726	82.54%	924	13.32%	287	4.14%	4,802	69.22%	6,937
Tillman	3,331	70.92%	1,256	26.74%	110	2.34%	2,075	44.18%	4,697
Tulsa	125,278	77.75%	32,779	20.34%	3,069	1.90%	92,499	57.41%	161,126
Wagoner	6,569	72.13%	2,257	24.78%	281	3.09%	4,312	47.35%	9,107
Washington	16,347	79.74%	3,658	17.84%	495	2.41%	12,689	61.90%	20,500
Washita	3,578	71.45%	1,305	26.06%	125	2.50%	2,273	45.39%	5,008
Woods	4,413	76.23%	1,234	21.32%	142	2.45%	3,179	54.91%	5,789
Woodward	5,350	80.05%	1,104	16.52%	229	3.43%	4,246	63.53%	6,683
Totals	759,025	73.70%	247,147	24.00%	23,728	2.30%	511,878	49.70%	1,029,900

== See also ==
- United States presidential elections in Oklahoma
