= Sugar Creek (Caddo County, Oklahoma) =

Location
- Country: United States

Physical characteristics
- Source
  - location: West of Hinton, Oklahoma
- Mouth: Washita River
  - location: East of Anadarko, Oklahoma
  - coordinates: 35°05′34″N 98°10′18″W

Sugar Creek rises west of Hinton in Caddo County, Oklahoma. It travels generally south-southeast directly through Lookeba and the northeast corner of Binger. It flows along the west boundary of Gracemont before turning more southeasterly and joining the Washita River to the east of Anadarko, Oklahoma.

The Sugar Creek Watershed, consisting of Sugar Creek and its tributaries, covers 232.4 square miles (148,748 acres). About 97.3 percent of the watershed is in Caddo County; about 2.7 percent, in the upper northeast corner, is in Canadian County. Small dams and reservoirs have been constructed to prevent flooding: the Sugar Creek watershed had 51 dams as of June, 2015. Some examples, all in Caddo County, include:

- Sugar Creek Site 11 Reservoir, 13 acres
- Sugar Creek Site 21 Reservoir, 39 acres
- Sugar Creek Site 25 Reservoir, 27 acres
- Sugar Creek Site 33 Reservoir, 19 acres

Tributaries of Sugar Creek include:

- Kickapoo Creek
- Medicine Creek
- Wildcat Creek
- Keechi Creek
- White Bread Creek
