= 1960 United States presidential election in Oklahoma =

- November 8, 1960

Nominee	Richard Nixon	John F. Kennedy
Party	Republican	Democratic
Home state	California	Massachusetts
Running mate	Henry Cabot Lodge Jr.	Lyndon B. Johnson
Electoral vote	7 (Note: A faithless elector cast their vote for Harry F. Byrd.)	0
Popular vote	533,039	370,111
Percentage	59.02%	40.98%
County results
Nixon
50–60%
60–70%
70–80%
80–90%
Kennedy
50–60%
60–70%
President before election
Dwight D. Eisenhower
Republican
Elected President
John F. Kennedy
Democratic

The 1960 United States presidential election in Oklahoma took place on November 8, 1960, as part of the 1960 United States presidential election. Voters chose eight representatives, or electors, to the Electoral College, who voted for president and vice president.

Oklahoma was won by incumbent Vice President Richard Nixon (R–California), running with United States Ambassador to the United Nations Henry Cabot Lodge Jr., with 59.02% of the popular vote, against Senator John F. Kennedy (D–Massachusetts), running with Senator Lyndon B. Johnson, with 40.98% of the popular vote. In the Electoral College, Nixon received seven of Oklahoma's eight electoral votes; the eighth was cast by a faithless elector for Harry F. Byrd of Virginia.

The faithless elector was Henry D. Irwin (October 22, 1917 – September 3, 1988), a career U.S. Army officer and Republican political figure from Oklahoma. Irwin later admitted in a CBS interview that he "could not stomach" Nixon. After the November election, he sent telegrams to the other 219 Republican electors urging them to support a Byrd-Goldwater ticket as a conservative alternative to both Kennedy and Nixon, receiving about 40 replies but failing to convince any other elector to defect. Irwin was subsequently subpoenaed by a Senate committee to testify about his electoral vote after initially declining an invitation to appear voluntarily. Oklahoma Republican chair Henry Bellmon stated that Irwin had acted entirely on his own.

With 59.02% of the popular vote, Oklahoma would prove to be Nixon's third strongest state in 1960 after Nebraska and Kansas. This election marked the first time since statehood that a Democrat won the presidency without carrying Oklahoma. Oklahoma was one of six states that swung towards Republicans compared to 1956, alongside Alabama, Georgia, Mississippi, South Carolina, and Tennessee.

== Results ==
1960 United States presidential election in Oklahoma
Party	Candidate	Running mate	Votes	Percentage	Electoral votes
Republican	Richard Nixon	Henry Cabot Lodge Jr.	533,039	59.02%	7
Democratic	John F. Kennedy	Lyndon B. Johnson	370,111	40.98%	0
Democratic	Harry F. Byrd	Barry Goldwater	0	0.00%	1
Totals			903,150	100.00%	8

=== Results by county ===
County	Richard Nixon Republican		John F. Kennedy Democratic		Margin		Total votes cast
County	#	%	#	%	#	%	Total votes cast
Adair	3,655	65.76%	1,903	34.24%	1,752	31.52%	5,558
Alfalfa	3,332	75.74%	1,067	24.26%	2,265	51.48%	4,399
Atoka	1,892	51.82%	1,759	48.18%	133	3.64%	3,651
Beaver	2,442	73.36%	887	26.64%	1,555	46.72%	3,329
Beckham	4,258	61.01%	2,721	38.99%	1,537	22.02%	6,979
Blaine	3,646	67.88%	1,725	32.12%	1,921	35.76%	5,371
Bryan	3,845	46.48%	4,428	53.52%	-583	-7.04%	8,273
Caddo	5,920	53.65%	5,115	46.35%	805	7.30%	11,035
Canadian	5,697	57.37%	4,234	42.63%	1,463	14.74%	9,931
Carter	6,288	42.69%	8,441	57.31%	-2,153	-14.62%	14,729
Cherokee	3,571	57.06%	2,687	42.94%	884	14.12%	6,258
Choctaw	2,531	46.25%	2,941	53.75%	-410	-7.50%	5,472
Cimarron	1,316	65.41%	696	34.59%	620	30.82%	2,012
Cleveland	9,292	59.23%	6,397	40.77%	2,895	18.46%	15,689
Coal	1,019	44.54%	1,269	55.46%	-250	-10.92%	2,288
Comanche	10,691	52.79%	9,562	47.21%	1,129	5.58%	20,253
Cotton	1,619	49.77%	1,634	50.23%	-15	-0.46%	3,253
Craig	3,770	57.45%	2,792	42.55%	978	14.90%	6,562
Creek	8,785	58.61%	6,205	41.39%	2,580	17.22%	14,990
Custer	5,050	64.80%	2,743	35.20%	2,307	29.60%	7,793
Delaware	3,639	61.46%	2,282	38.54%	1,357	22.92%	5,921
Dewey	2,115	66.16%	1,082	33.84%	1,033	32.32%	3,197
Ellis	2,085	74.62%	709	25.38%	1,376	49.24%	2,794
Garfield	14,860	69.30%	6,582	30.70%	8,278	38.60%	21,442
Garvin	5,125	51.66%	4,795	48.34%	330	3.32%	9,920
Grady	5,913	52.06%	5,446	47.94%	467	4.12%	11,359
Grant	2,810	61.99%	1,723	38.01%	1,087	23.98%	4,533
Greer	2,158	55.96%	1,698	44.04%	460	11.92%	3,856
Harmon	1,142	47.44%	1,265	52.56%	-123	-5.12%	2,407
Harper	2,057	73.44%	744	26.56%	1,313	46.88%	2,801
Haskell	1,858	52.04%	1,712	47.96%	146	4.08%	3,570
Hughes	3,117	50.49%	3,057	49.51%	60	0.98%	6,174
Jackson	3,375	47.30%	3,761	52.70%	-386	-5.40%	7,136
Jefferson	1,343	40.85%	1,945	59.15%	-602	-18.30%	3,288
Johnston	1,441	44.16%	1,822	55.84%	-381	-11.68%	3,263
Kay	15,156	64.76%	8,249	35.24%	6,907	29.52%	23,405
Kingfisher	3,501	65.78%	1,821	34.22%	1,680	31.56%	5,322
Kiowa	3,515	57.13%	2,638	42.87%	877	14.26%	6,153
Latimer	1,454	48.66%	1,534	51.34%	-80	-2.68%	2,988
LeFlore	5,302	52.26%	4,844	47.74%	458	4.52%	10,146
Lincoln	5,528	62.94%	3,255	37.06%	2,273	25.88%	8,783
Logan	5,121	64.49%	2,820	35.51%	2,301	28.98%	7,941
Love	932	39.24%	1,443	60.76%	-511	-21.52%	2,375
McClain	2,547	51.85%	2,365	48.15%	182	3.70%	4,912
McCurtain	3,562	45.88%	4,202	54.12%	-640	-8.24%	7,764
McIntosh	2,221	50.41%	2,185	49.59%	36	0.82%	4,406
Major	2,892	80.16%	716	19.84%	2,176	60.32%	3,608
Marshall	1,325	42.50%	1,793	57.50%	-468	-15.00%	3,118
Mayes	5,194	58.26%	3,721	41.74%	1,473	16.52%	8,915
Murray	1,993	48.35%	2,129	51.65%	-136	-3.30%	4,122
Muskogee	12,403	52.81%	11,082	47.19%	1,321	5.62%	23,485
Noble	3,198	62.61%	1,910	37.39%	1,288	25.22%	5,108
Nowata	3,014	58.65%	2,125	41.35%	889	17.30%	5,139
Okfuskee	2,510	56.05%	1,968	43.95%	542	12.10%	4,478
Oklahoma	102,992	61.44%	64,648	38.56%	38,344	22.88%	167,640
Okmulgee	7,107	49.46%	7,262	50.54%	-155	-1.08%	14,369
Osage	7,508	56.41%	5,801	43.59%	1,707	12.82%	13,309
Ottawa	6,520	53.33%	5,705	46.67%	815	6.66%	12,225
Pawnee	3,153	65.80%	1,639	34.20%	1,514	31.60%	4,792
Payne	9,943	63.59%	5,694	36.41%	4,249	27.18%	15,637
Pittsburg	5,834	44.39%	7,310	55.61%	-1,476	-11.22%	13,144
Pontotoc	5,863	55.75%	4,654	44.25%	1,209	11.50%	10,517
Pottawatomie	9,421	53.87%	8,067	46.13%	1,354	7.74%	17,488
Pushmataha	1,728	51.46%	1,630	48.54%	98	2.92%	3,358
Roger Mills	1,463	64.39%	809	35.61%	654	28.78%	2,272
Rogers	5,412	63.08%	3,167	36.92%	2,245	26.16%	8,579
Seminole	5,505	56.40%	4,256	43.60%	1,249	12.80%	9,761
Sequoyah	3,862	56.76%	2,942	43.24%	920	13.52%	6,804
Stephens	8,084	53.95%	6,899	46.05%	1,185	7.90%	14,983
Texas	4,314	73.58%	1,549	26.42%	2,765	47.16%	5,863
Tillman	2,678	49.46%	2,736	50.54%	-58	-1.08%	5,414
Tulsa	89,899	63.03%	52,725	36.97%	37,174	26.06%	142,624
Wagoner	3,570	56.87%	2,707	43.13%	863	13.74%	6,277
Washington	13,700	71.43%	5,479	28.57%	8,221	42.86%	19,179
Washita	3,209	57.07%	2,414	42.93%	795	14.14%	5,623
Woods	4,064	68.12%	1,902	31.88%	2,162	36.24%	5,966
Woodward	4,185	73.78%	1,487	26.22%	2,698	47.56%	5,672
Totals	533,039	59.02%	370,111	40.98%	162,928	18.04%	903,150

==== Counties that flipped from Democratic to Republican ====
- Atoka
- Beckham
- Caddo
- Comanche
- Garvin
- Grady
- Greer
- Haskell
- Hughes
- Kiowa
- LeFlore
- McClain
- McIntosh
- Muskogee
- Okfuskee
- Pontotoc
- Pottawatomie
- Pushmataha
- Roger Mills
- Seminole
- Sequoyah
- Stephens
- Washita

== See also ==
- United States presidential elections in Oklahoma
