= Gracemont, Oklahoma =

Town in the United States

- Town
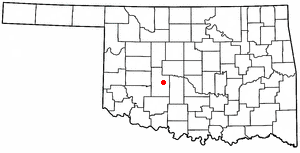
- Location of Gracemont, Oklahoma
- Coordinates: 35°11′16″N 98°15′33″W
- Country: United States
- State: Oklahoma
- County: Caddo

Area
  - Total: 0.17 sq mi (0.43 km^{2})
  - Land: 0.17 sq mi (0.43 km^{2})
  - Water: 0 sq mi (0.00 km^{2})
- Elevation: 1,263 ft (385 m)

Population (2020)
  - Total: 279
  - Density: 1,685.4/sq mi (650.72/km^{2})
- Time zone: UTC-6 (CST)
  - Summer (DST): UTC-5 (CDT)
- ZIP code: 73042
- Area codes: 405/572
- FIPS code: 40-30600
- GNIS feature ID: 2412696

Gracemont is a town in Caddo County, Oklahoma, United States. The population was 279 as of the 2020 United States census. The town moniker is a portmanteau of 'Grace' and 'Montgomery,' the names of two friends of the first postmaster, Alice L. Bailey.

== Geography ==
Gracemont is located east of the center of Caddo County in the valley of Sugar Creek, a tributary of the Washita River and part of the Red River watershed.

U.S. Route 281 passes through the town, leading south 8 miles (13 km) to Anadarko, the county seat, and north 12 miles (19 km) to Binger.

According to the United States Census Bureau, the town of Gracemont has a total area of 0.15 square miles (0.4 km^{2}), all land.

== Demographics ==
Historical population
Census	Pop.	Note	%±
1920	266		—
1930	394		48.1%
1940	328		−16.8%
1950	301		−8.2%
1960	306		1.7%
1970	424		38.6%
1980	503		18.6%
1990	339		−32.6%
2000	336		−0.9%
2010	318		−5.4%
2020	279		−12.3%
U.S. Decennial Census

=== 2020 census ===
As of the 2020 census, Gracemont had a population of 279. The median age was 33.9 years. 28.7% of residents were under the age of 18 and 16.8% of residents were 65 years of age or older. For every 100 females there were 84.8 males, and for every 100 females age 18 and over there were 77.7 males age 18 and over.

0.0% of residents lived in urban areas, while 100.0% lived in rural areas.

There were 114 households in Gracemont, of which 38.6% had children under the age of 18 living in them. Of all households, 42.1% were married-couple households, 19.3% were households with a male householder and no spouse or partner present, and 35.1% were households with a female householder and no spouse or partner present. About 27.2% of all households were made up of individuals and 16.6% had someone living alone who was 65 years of age or older.

There were 153 housing units, of which 25.5% were vacant. The homeowner vacancy rate was 2.9% and the rental vacancy rate was 15.9%.

Racial composition as of the 2020 census
Race	Number	Percent
White	197	70.6%
Black or African American	0	0.0%
American Indian and Alaska Native	41	14.7%
Asian	0	0.0%
Native Hawaiian and Other Pacific Islander	0	0.0%
Some other race	5	1.8%
Two or more races	36	12.9%
Hispanic or Latino (of any race)	29	10.4%

=== 2000 census ===
As of the census of 2000, there were 336 people, 143 households, and 90 families residing in the town. The population density was 2,199.3 inhabitants per square mile (849.2/km^{2}). There were 169 housing units at an average density of 1,106.2 per square mile (427.1/km^{2}). The racial makeup of the town was 80.65% White, 12.50% Native American, 4.46% from other races, and 2.38% from two or more races. Hispanic or Latino of any race were 9.52% of the population.

There were 143 households, out of which 30.1% had children under the age of 18 living with them, 49.7% were married couples living together, 11.9% had a female householder with no husband present, and 36.4% were non-families. 35.0% of all households were made up of individuals, and 14.7% had someone living alone who was 65 years of age or older. The average household size was 2.35 and the average family size was 3.05.

In the town, the population was spread out, with 26.8% under the age of 18, 10.1% from 18 to 24, 25.0% from 25 to 44, 20.2% from 45 to 64, and 17.9% who were 65 years of age or older. The median age was 34 years. For every 100 females, there were 98.8 males. For every 100 females age 18 and over, there were 85.0 males.

The median income for a household in the town was $21,875, and the median income for a family was $34,167. Males had a median income of $24,792 versus $18,000 for females. The per capita income for the town was $13,026. About 14.9% of families and 19.5% of the population were below the poverty line, including 33.3% of those under age 18 and 8.7% of those age 65 or over.

== Notable people ==
- T. C. Cannon, Native American artist
- Sunset Carson, B-western star of the 1940s
- Joe Edelen, former Major League Baseball relief pitcher, 1973 Major League Baseball draft
- Doris McLemore, last fluent speaker of the Wichita language
- Kaycee Nicole Swenson, fictitious persona, well-known case of Münchausen by Internet from 1999 to 2001
- Harry Teague, former U.S. Representative for New Mexico's 2nd congressional district
