= Anadarko Public Schools =

School district in Oklahoma

Location
- Anadarko, Oklahoma United States

District information
- Type: Public

Other information
- Website: https://www.apswarriors.com/

The Anadarko Independent School District, also known as Anadarko Public Schools, is a school district based in Anadarko, Oklahoma United States.

In addition to Anadarko it serves Washita.

== Schools ==
Secondary schools

- Anadarko High School
- Anadarko Middle School

Elementary schools

- Anadarko East Elementary School
- Anadarko Mission Elementary School
- Anadarko Sunset Elementary School

== See also ==
- List of school districts in Oklahoma
