= Provine Service Station =

- U.S. National Register of Historic Places
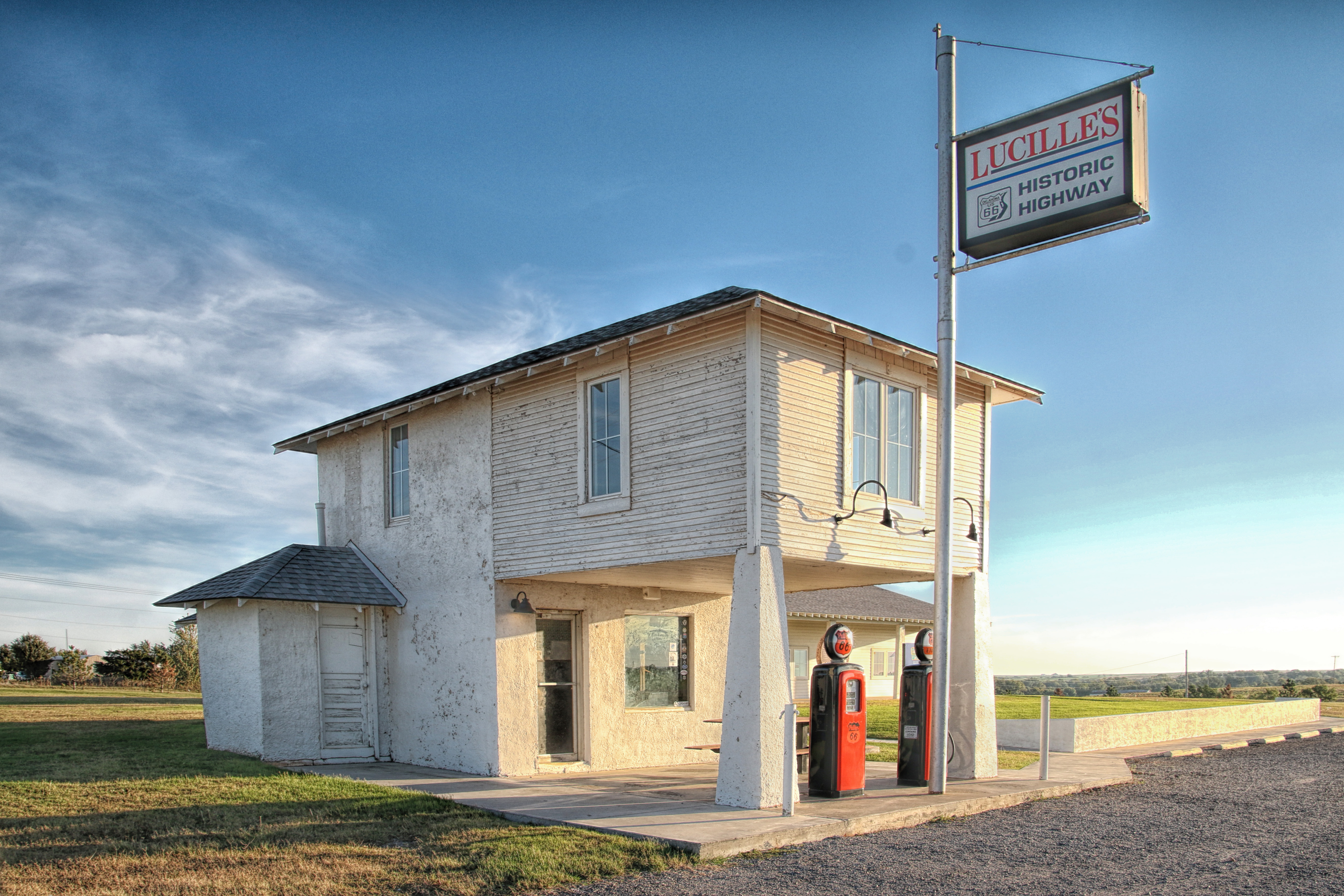

- Location within Oklahoma Location within the United States
- Location: 1/2 mile west of Highway 58
- Nearest city: Hydro, Oklahoma
- Coordinates: 35.53718°N 98.58823°W
- Area: U.S. Route 66 in Oklahoma
- Built: 1929
- Architect: Carl Ditmore
- Architectural style: Bungalow/Craftsman
- MPS: Route 66 and associated historic resources in Oklahoma MPD
- NRHP reference No.: 97000803
- Added to NRHP: July 17, 1997

The Provine Service Station (later the Hamons Court, Hamons' Service Station or simply Lucille's Place) is a historic filling station on U.S. Route 66 in Oklahoma. Located a half-mile south of Hydro, Oklahoma and operated by Lucille Hamons from 1941 until her death on August 18, 2000, the site was added to the US National Register of Historic Places in 1997.

Lucille Hamons' generous assistance to motorists on U.S. Route 66 during hard economic times at the end of the Great Depression would make her a US Route 66 legend, earning the nickname "Mother of the Mother Road."

== History ==
Opened by Carl Ditmore in 1929, this is one of the few remaining examples of a two-story fuel station with the owner's residence situated above the pumps on an upper floor. W.O. and Ida Waldroup changed the name to Provine Service Station after buying the station in 1934 and would later add tourist cabins to provide five motel rooms on-site.

Lucille and Carl Hamons acquired the Provine Station in 1941, a few months before the US entry into World War II. Mobilisation for war brought wartime rationing of fuel and tires, causing civilian traffic on the highway to decline. Carl Hamons worked as an independent trucker, leaving Lucille to operate the station and the motel. Traffic on US 66 would then increase substantially during the 1950s and 1960s, only to vanish with the completion of Interstate 40 in the area in 1971.

"After Carl got a truck to earn more money, I was alone here to run this place. During this time, people from Arkansas, Missouri, Kansas, and eastern Oklahoma were travelling the road to the West Coast to find jobs. ... Many times I would have people stop that were completely broke, and I would feed them and give them gas in exchange for some appliance or other articles of value they might have. Sometimes I would just buy their old broke-down cars, and then they would catch the bus and head on west looking for work."

— Lucille Hamons

After the highway was bypassed, the motel closed and Carl and Lucille would divorce but Lucille's would continue to serve a largely local clientele. The station became known for vending very cold beer from its old cooler at a time when nearby Weatherford, Oklahoma (home of Southwestern Oklahoma State University) was officially a dry town. The last fuel was dispensed in 1986 and the station ultimately became a souvenir shop, with demand in the 1990s driven largely by nostalgia surrounding a road which by then had become not merely a decommissioned highway but a powerful symbol of a bygone era.

The original "Hamons Court" motel sign was donated by the Hamons family in 2003 to the Smithsonian National Museum of American History, where it is now displayed as part of an exhibition on "America on the Move".
