= Cogar, Oklahoma =

Unincorporated community in Oklahoma, US

- Unincorporated community

- Location within the state of Oklahoma Cogar (the United States)
- Coordinates: 35°20′2″N 98°7′50″W
- Country: United States
- State: Oklahoma
- County: Caddo
- Elevation: 1,470 ft (448 m)
- Time zone: UTC-6 (Central (CST))
  - Summer (DST): UTC-5 (CDT)
- GNIS feature ID: 1100310

Cogar is a small unincorporated rural community in northeast Caddo County, Oklahoma, United States. It is located approximately 10 miles west of Minco, Oklahoma on Oklahoma State Highway 37, and about 5 miles east of Salyer Lake on Oklahoma State Highway 152. The post office was established March 25, 1902, and discontinued September 30, 1954.
