= First Baptist Church (Colored) =

Historic church in Oklahoma, United States

- U.S. National Register of Historic Places
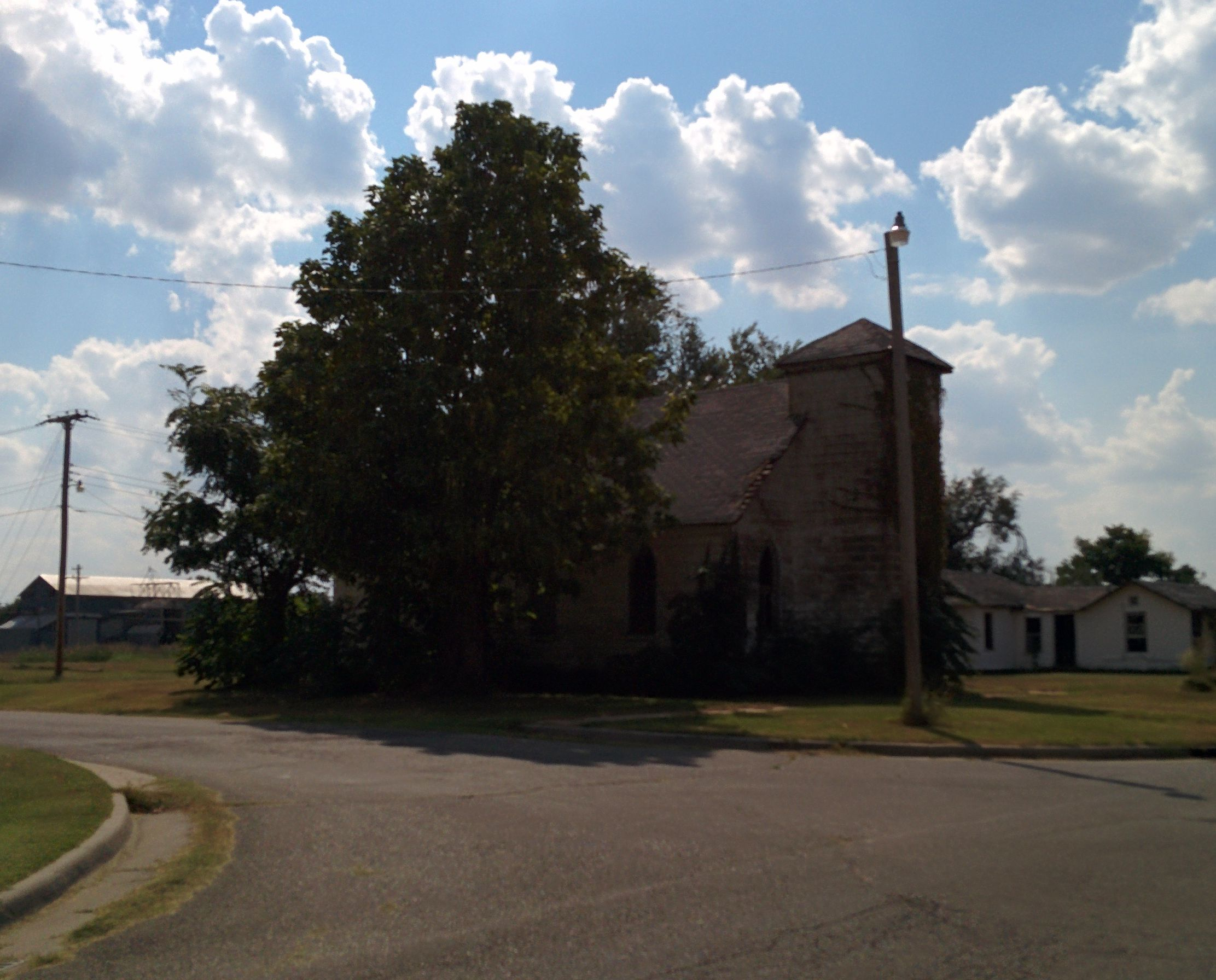
- The building in September 2014

- Location within Oklahoma Location within the United States
- Location: Jct. of E. Washington Ave. and NE Fifth St., Anadarko, Oklahoma
- Coordinates: 35.0782°N 98.2373°W
- Area: less than one acre
- Built: 1914
- NRHP reference No.: 07001263
- Added to NRHP: December 11, 2007

First Baptist Church is a historic Baptist church building at the junction of East Washington Avenue and Northeast Fifth Street in Anadarko, Oklahoma.

It was built in 1914 and was added to the National Register of Historic Places in 2007.
