= Hydro, Oklahoma =

Town in Oklahoma, US

- Town
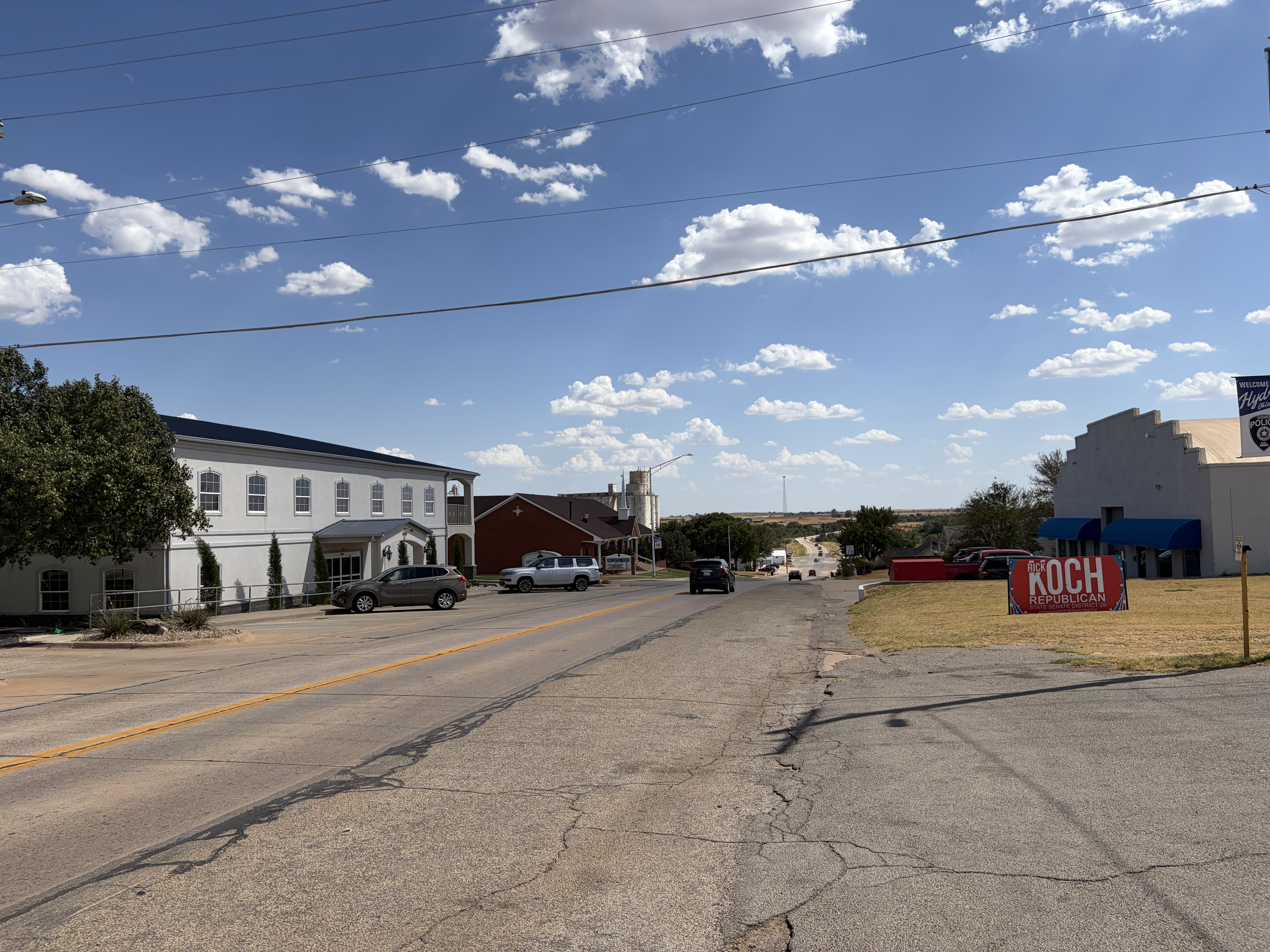
- Facing southbound on Arapaho Avenue in Hydro in August 2026

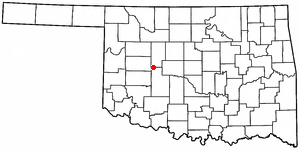
- Location of Hydro, Oklahoma
- Coordinates: 35°32′53″N 98°34′48″W
- Country: United States
- State: Oklahoma
- Counties: Caddo, Blaine

Area
  - Total: 0.69 sq mi (1.80 km^{2})
  - Land: 0.69 sq mi (1.80 km^{2})
  - Water: 0 sq mi (0.00 km^{2})
- Elevation: 1,526 ft (465 m)

Population (2020)
  - Total: 927
  - Density: 1,330.2/sq mi (513.58/km^{2})
- Time zone: UTC-6 (Central (CST))
  - Summer (DST): UTC-5 (CDT)
- ZIP code: 73048
- Area codes: 405/572
- FIPS code: 40-36700
- GNIS feature ID: 2412785
- Website: hydrooklahoma.com

Hydro is a town in Caddo and Blaine counties in the U.S. state of Oklahoma. The population was 927 as of the 2020 United States census.

== History ==
The town was founded on August 6, 1901. Built near the Choctaw, Oklahoma and Gulf Railroad, the settlement was originally called "Caddo", but when the post office was established in September 1901, the name was changed to "Hydro" in reference to the town's plentiful well water.

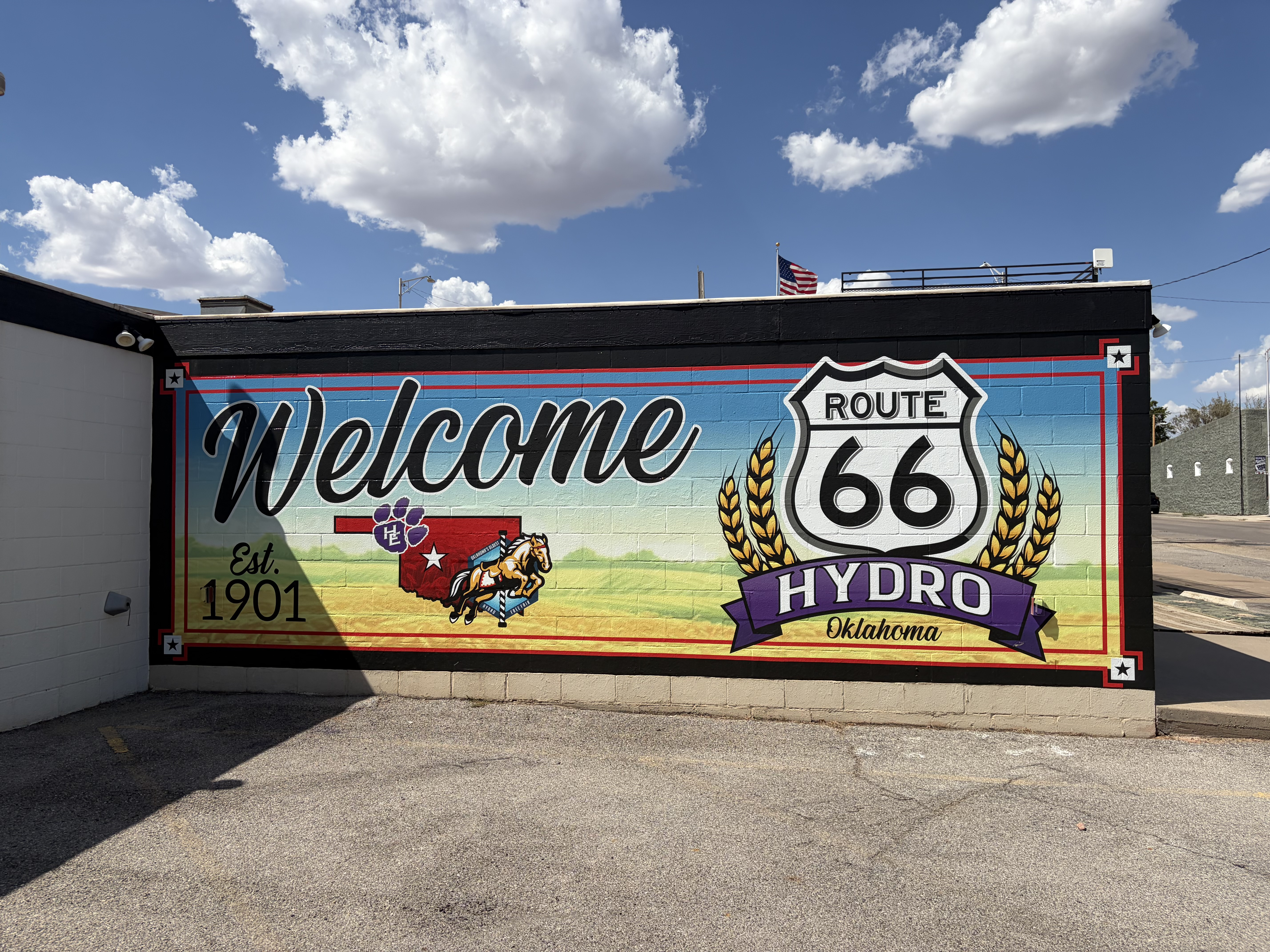
Welcome mural in Hydro, OK

== Geography ==
Hydro is located near the northwestern corner of Caddo County at an elevation of 1,557 feet (475 m). A small part of the town extends north into Blaine County.

The town is located 0.5 miles (0.80 km) north of Interstate 40, with access from Exit 88. I-40 leads west 7 miles (11 km) to Weatherford and east 61 miles (98 km) to downtown Oklahoma City.

According to the United States Census Bureau, Hydro has a total area of 0.66 square miles (1.7 km^{2}), all land.

== Demographics ==
Historical population
Census	Pop.	Note	%±
1910	562		—
1920	686		22.1%
1930	948		38.2%
1940	759		−19.9%
1950	714		−5.9%
1960	697		−2.4%
1970	805		15.5%
1980	938		16.5%
1990	977		4.2%
2000	1,060		8.5%
2010	969		−8.6%
2020	927		−4.3%
U.S. Decennial Census

=== 2020 census ===
As of the 2020 census, Hydro had a population of 927. The median age was 38.8 years. 24.1% of residents were under the age of 18 and 20.9% of residents were 65 years of age or older. For every 100 females there were 88.8 males, and for every 100 females age 18 and over there were 86.7 males age 18 and over.

0.0% of residents lived in urban areas, while 100.0% lived in rural areas.

There were 386 households in Hydro, of which 34.7% had children under the age of 18 living in them. Of all households, 47.9% were married-couple households, 18.7% were households with a male householder and no spouse or partner present, and 27.2% were households with a female householder and no spouse or partner present. About 31.1% of all households were made up of individuals and 13.7% had someone living alone who was 65 years of age or older.

There were 431 housing units, of which 10.4% were vacant. The homeowner vacancy rate was 6.9% and the rental vacancy rate was 5.5%.

Racial composition as of the 2020 census
Race	Number	Percent
White	796	85.9%
Black or African American	12	1.3%
American Indian and Alaska Native	13	1.4%
Asian	0	0.0%
Native Hawaiian and Other Pacific Islander	1	0.1%
Some other race	28	3.0%
Two or more races	77	8.3%
Hispanic or Latino (of any race)	65	7.0%

=== 2000 census ===
As of the census of 2000, there were 1,060 people, 413 households, and 280 families residing in the town. The population density was 1,752.4 inhabitants per square mile (676.6/km^{2}). There were 466 housing units at an average density of 770.4 per square mile (297.5/km^{2}). The racial makeup of the town was 91.32% White, 0.19% African American, 3.58% Native American, 0.19% Asian, 0.28% Pacific Islander, 1.89% from other races, and 2.55% from two or more races. Latino of any race were 4.53% of the population.

There were 413 households, out of which 31.5% had children under the age of 18 living with them, 51.8% were married couples living together, 10.7% had a female householder with no husband present, and 32.2% were non-families. 29.1% of all households were made up of individuals, and 11.6% had someone living alone who was 65 years of age or older. The average household size was 2.42 and the average family size was 2.98.

In the town, the population was spread out, with 24.1% under the age of 18, 9.7% from 18 to 24, 23.9% from 25 to 44, 20.8% from 45 to 64, and 21.5% who were 65 years of age or older. The median age was 39 years. For every 100 females, there were 84.7 males. For every 100 females age 18 and over, there were 83.4 males.

The median income for a household in the town was $27,235, and the median income for a family was $31,071. Males had a median income of $26,645 versus $17,308 for females. The per capita income for the town was $13,256. About 14.4% of families and 18.0% of the population were below the poverty line, including 23.6% of those under age 18 and 10.1% of those age 65 or over.

== Education ==
The school district is Hydro-Eakly Public Schools.

== Notable people ==
- Minnie Lou Bradley, matriarch of the Bradley 3 Ranch in the Texas Panhandle, grew up near Hydro.
- Lucille Hamons, a Route 66 icon dubbed "The Mother of the Mother Road."

== See also ==
- National Register of Historic Places listings in Caddo County, Oklahoma
  - Bridgeport Hill-Hydro OK 66 Segment of U.S. Route 66 in Oklahoma
  - Provine Service Station
