= Binger, Oklahoma =

Town in Oklahoma, US

- Town
- Logo

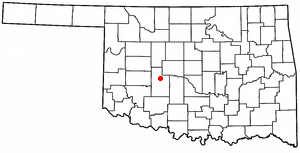
- Location of Binger, Oklahoma
- Coordinates: 35°18′38″N 98°20′35″W
- Country: United States
- State: Oklahoma
- County: Caddo

Area
  - Total: 0.86 sq mi (2.23 km^{2})
  - Land: 0.86 sq mi (2.23 km^{2})
  - Water: 0 sq mi (0.00 km^{2})
- Elevation: 1,345 ft (410 m)

Population (2020)
  - Total: 438
  - Density: 507.7/sq mi (196.03/km^{2})
- Time zone: UTC-6 (Central (CST))
  - Summer (DST): UTC-5 (CDT)
- ZIP code: 73009
- Area code: 405
- FIPS code: 40-06200
- GNIS feature ID: 2411692
- Website: townofbinger.org

Binger /ˈbɪŋɡər/ is a town in Caddo County, Oklahoma, United States. As of the 2020 census, Binger had a population of 438. It is the headquarters of the Caddo Nation of Oklahoma, who were settled in the area during the 1870s.

== History ==
Binger was established immediately after the opening of the Wichita-Caddo Reservation in August 1901, and organized by the Washita Valley Townsite Company. It was named for Binger Hermann, then Commissioner of the U.S. Land Office. A post office named Binger opened in November 1901.

Binger's early economy was based on agriculture in the surrounding area, and whose principal crops were peanuts and cotton. The Enid and Anadarko Railway constructed a line from Bridgeport to Anadarko via Binger in 1901–1902. This railway was purchased by the Chicago, Rock Island and Pacific Railway in 1903, and was abandoned in 1939.

The Binger Journal, a weekly newspaper, began publication in 1902. Other early businesses included:the Newell Department Store, the First State Bank of Binger, the Binger Hotel, the L. A. Cross Lumber Company and the Deer Head Saloon. The population was 257 at the time of statehood in 1907, and increased to 280 in 1910.

According to the U.S. Census, the peak population was 849 in 1930, then dropped to 840 in 1940, and continuing to decline to 603 in 1960.

The Caddo Nation headquarters complex is located in Binger. It includes the Caddo Nation Heritage Museum, which opened in 2001.

== Geography ==
Binger is located in northeast Caddo County in the valley of Sugar Creek, a tributary of the Washita River, part of the Red River watershed.

U.S. Route 281 passes through the town, leading north 12 miles (19 km) to Hinton and 16 miles (26 km) to Interstate 40, and leading east, then south 20 miles (32 km) to Anadarko. Oklahoma State Highway 152 also passes through the town, leading west 36 miles (58 km) to New Cordell and east 56 miles (90 km) to the center of Oklahoma City.

According to the United States Census Bureau, the town of Binger has a total area of 0.87 square miles (2.26 km^{2}), all land.

== Demographics ==
Historical population
Census	Pop.	Note	%±
1910	280		—
1920	482		72.1%
1930	849		76.1%
1940	840		−1.1%
1950	773		−8.0%
1960	603		−22.0%
1970	730		21.1%
1980	791		8.4%
1990	724		−8.5%
2000	708		−2.2%
2010	672		−5.1%
2020	438		−34.8%
U.S. Decennial Census

=== 2020 census ===
As of the 2020 census, Binger had a population of 438. The median age was 50.6 years. 19.9% of residents were under the age of 18 and 29.7% of residents were 65 years of age or older. For every 100 females there were 87.2 males, and for every 100 females age 18 and over there were 80.9 males age 18 and over.

0.0% of residents lived in urban areas, while 100.0% lived in rural areas.

There were 177 households in Binger, of which 24.3% had children under the age of 18 living in them. Of all households, 43.5% were married-couple households, 17.5% were households with a male householder and no spouse or partner present, and 33.9% were households with a female householder and no spouse or partner present. About 26.6% of all households were made up of individuals and 16.4% had someone living alone who was 65 years of age or older.

There were 229 housing units, of which 22.7% were vacant. The homeowner vacancy rate was 2.3% and the rental vacancy rate was 20.0%.

Racial composition as of the 2020 census
Race	Number	Percent
White	332	75.8%
Black or African American	19	4.3%
American Indian and Alaska Native	57	13.0%
Asian	0	0.0%
Native Hawaiian and Other Pacific Islander	2	0.5%
Some other race	5	1.1%
Two or more races	23	5.3%
Hispanic or Latino (of any race)	41	9.4%

=== 2000 census ===
As of the census of 2000, there were 712 people, 281 households, and 202 families residing in the town. The population density was 908.3 inhabitants per square mile (350.7/km^{2}). There were 327 housing units at an average density of 419.5 per square mile (162.0/km^{2}). The racial makeup of the town was 70.90% White, 4.80% African American, 13.70% Native American, 0.28% Asian, 3.81% from other races, and 6.50% from two or more races. Hispanic or Latino of any race were 7.06% of the population.

There were 281 households, out of which 33.5% had children under the age of 18 living with them, 54.8% were married couples living together, 12.1% had a female householder with no husband present, and 28.1% were non-families. 27.0% of all households were made up of individuals, and 16.4% had someone living alone who was 65 years of age or older. The average household size was 2.52 and the average family size was 3.05.

In the town, the population was spread out, with 27.5% under the age of 18, 5.4% from 18 to 24, 28.4% from 25 to 44, 22.6% from 45 to 64, and 16.1% who were 65 years of age or older. The median age was 38 years. For every 100 females, there were 92.9 males. For every 100 females age 18 and over, there were 92.9 males.

The median income for a household in the town was $24,333, and the median income for a family was $31,406. Males had a median income of $31,625 versus $19,844 for females. The per capita income for the town was $11,862. About 15.5% of families and 22.3% of the population were below the poverty line, including 28.6% of those under age 18 and 15.5% of those age 65 or over.

== Notable people ==
- Johnny Bench, Hall of Fame catcher for the Cincinnati Reds during the Big Red Machine era, spent much of his boyhood here
- Verlon Thompson, award-winning singer-songwriter, performer, partnered for many years with Guy Clark, Darrell Scott
