= Oklahoma State Highway 126 =

Former state highway in Oklahoma, United States

State Highway 126
- 240th Street
- SH-126 highlighted in red

Route information
- Maintained by McClain County, Oklahoma
- Length: 9.1 mi (14.6 km)
- Existed: 1956–1966

Major junctions
- West end: SH-76 north of Dibble
- East end: SH-24 in Washington

Location
- Country: United States
- State: Oklahoma

Highway system
- Oklahoma State Highway System; Interstate; US; State; Turnpikes
← SH-125	→ SH-127

State Highway 126 (abbreviated SH-126) was a state highway in McClain County, Oklahoma. It ran from SH-76 north of Dibble to SH-24 in Washington, paralleling SH-74B. The route was 9.1 miles (14.6 km) long, and did not have any lettered spur routes.

SH-126 existed as a state highway for about ten years, from 1956 to 1966. After it was decommissioned, it was given to McClain County. The road is currently signed as 240th Street in McClain County's 9-1-1 road naming system. Before this, it was commonly referred to as Washington Road.

== Route description ==
SH-126 began at what is now the intersection of SH-76 and 240th Street. It proceeded east from this intersection along 240th Street. At present-day May Avenue, the highway turned south to cross Dibble Creek, a tributary of Walnut Creek. After crossing the bridge, the highway continued east on 240th Street, crossing Sandy Creek, another tributary of Walnut Creek. The route then ended at SH-24 on the western outskirts of Washington.

== History ==
SH-126 first appears on the 1957 Oklahoma state highway map, implying it was added to the state highway system the year prior. As of 1958, the highway in its entirety was composed of gravel. By the following year, the east half of the highway had been paved. The highway remained in this state until 1966, when it was removed from the state highway system and turned over to McClain County.

== Junction list ==
The entire route was in McClain County.

Location	mi	km	Destinations	Notes
	0.0	0.0	SH-76	Western terminus
Washington	9.1	14.6	SH-24	Eastern terminus
1.000 mi = 1.609 km; 1.000 km = 0.621 mi
