= Oklahoma State Highway 24 =

State highway in Oklahoma, United States

State Highway 24

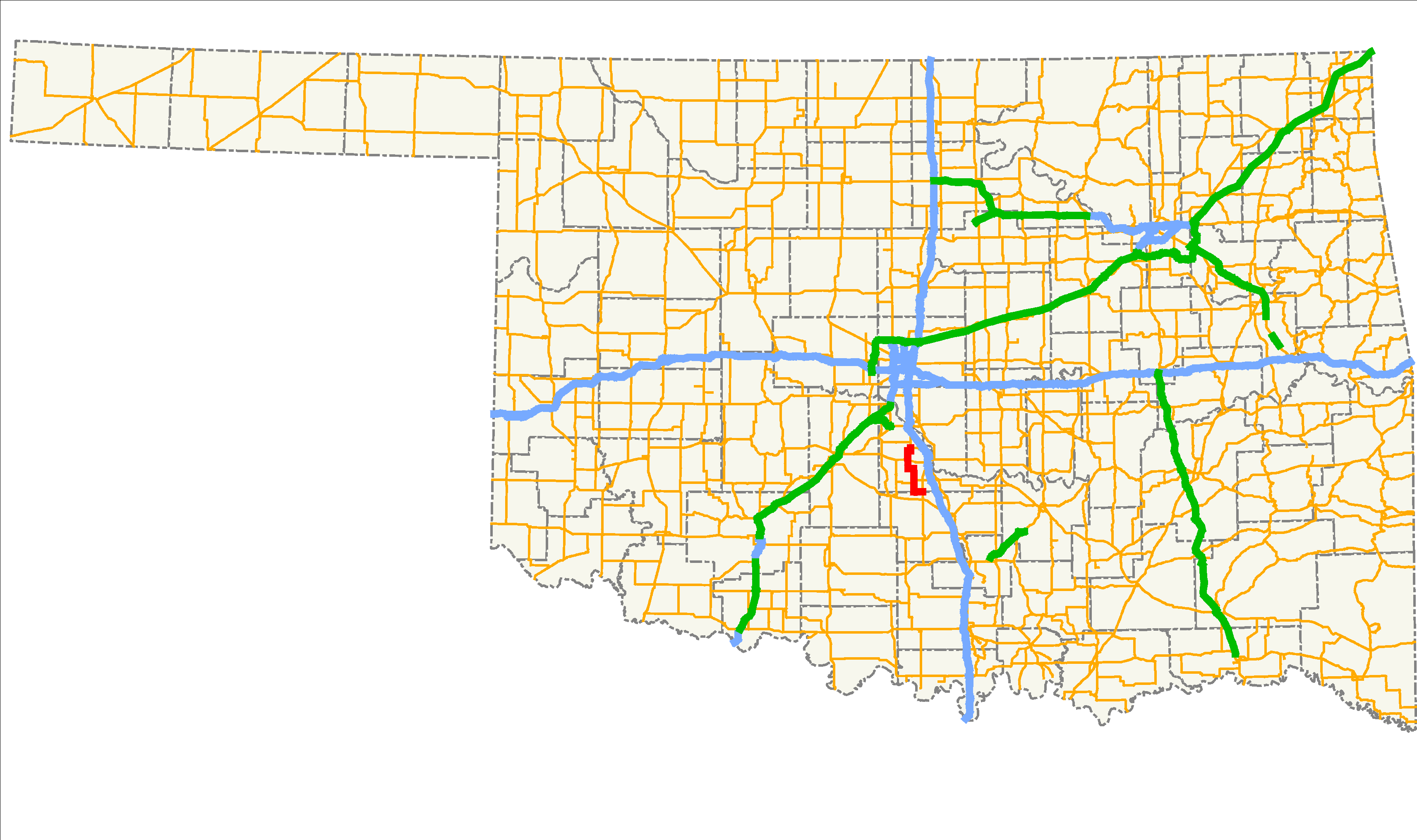

Route information
- Maintained by ODOT
- Length: 21.1 mi (34.0 km)
- Existed: ca. 1936–present

Major junctions
- South end: SH-74 north of Maysville
- North end: SH-74 north of Washington

Location
- Country: United States
- State: Oklahoma

Highway system
- Oklahoma State Highway System; Interstate; US; State; Turnpikes
← SH-23	→ SH-25

State Highway 24 (SH-24) is a highway maintained by the U.S. state of Oklahoma. It runs for 21.1 miles (34.0 km) through central Oklahoma, almost entirely within McClain County. It is signed north–south and has no lettered spur routes.

SH-24 was designated in 1936, and originally extended southward into Garvin County to an intersection with SH-19 between Maysville and Lindsay. By 1950, its southern terminus had been moved to its current location, while a new bridge near Washington caused a realignment of the highway in the early 1990s.

== Route description ==
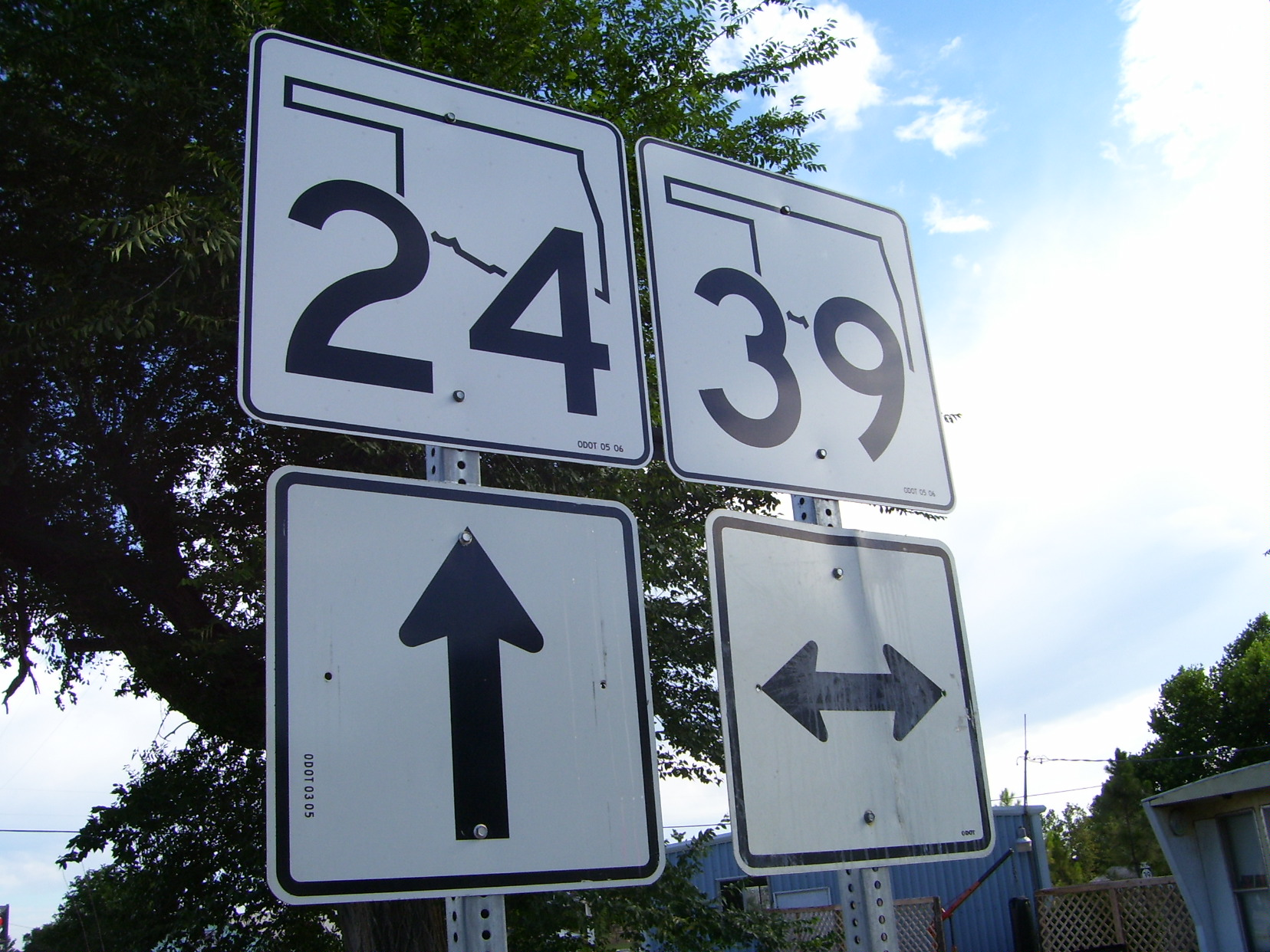
SH-24 southbound approaching SH-39 in Woody Chapel

The highway begins where State Highway 74 crosses the McClain–Garvin County line, about three miles (5 km) north of Maysville. From here, SH-24 runs west along the county line for three miles (5 km), where it turns due north in the unincorporated community of Storey. It has a brief, one-mile (1.6 km) concurrency with SH-59 east of Payne. After this, the road turns west again and returns to a due north course before intersecting SH-39 in the unincorporated town of Woody Chapel.

From Woody Chapel, Highway 24 continues northward (encountering a few curves to avoid a small pond) to the town of Washington. Through Washington, the road runs east–west and is named Morehead Street. After passing through Washington, SH-24 turns back northward, crossing Walnut Creek just after the turn. At the southern limit of the town of Goldsby, the road meets SH-74 again. At this intersection, the mainline road becomes SH-74 northbound, turning right is SH-74 southbound, and turning left puts one on the old SH-24 alignment through Washington.

== History ==
SH-24 first appeared on the 1937 State Highway map, meaning it was first designated sometime between May 1936 and April 1937. The original route continues south from where the highway now turns to run along the McClain–Garvin county line, ending at SH-19 between Maysville and Lindsay. This routing was shown on the 1948 map, while the current southern terminus was first shown on the 1950 map, suggesting the change was made sometime between 1948 and 1950.

From the highway's creation to the early 1990s, the road ran north along Main Street through downtown Washington, crossing over Walnut Creek via an old, one-lane truss bridge, built in 1927. However, a new bridge to the east of town was built in 1993, and SH-24 routed over it. The old bridge still serves as an alternate route out of Washington; the old SH-24 alignment has been designated "Walnut Creek Road" by McClain County.

== Junction list ==
County	Location	mi	km	Destinations	Notes
Garvin–McClain county line		0.0	0.0	SH-74	Southern terminus
McClain		6.1	9.8	SH-59	Southern end of SH-59 concurrency
McClain		7.1	11.4	SH-59	Northern end of SH-59 concurrency
McClain	Woody Chapel	16.1	25.9	SH-39	
McClain	Goldsby	21.1	34.0	SH-74	Northern terminus
1.000 mi = 1.609 km; 1.000 km = 0.621 mi: Concurrency terminus
