= Cole, Oklahoma =

- Town
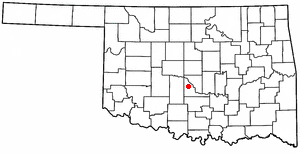
- Location in Oklahoma
- Coordinates: 35°06′21″N 97°33′54″W
- Country: United States
- State: Oklahoma
- County: McClain

Area
  - Total: 15.07 sq mi (39.03 km^{2})
  - Land: 14.98 sq mi (38.80 km^{2})
  - Water: 0.089 sq mi (0.23 km^{2})
- Elevation: 1,112 ft (339 m)

Population (2020)
  - Total: 624
  - Density: 41.6/sq mi (16.08/km^{2})
- Time zone: UTC-6 (Central (CST))
  - Summer (DST): UTC-5 (CDT)
- ZIP Codes: 73010 (Blanchard); 73093 (Washington)
- FIPS code: 40-16200
- GNIS feature ID: 2413225

Cole is a town in McClain County, Oklahoma, United States. The population was 624 at the 2020 census, up from 555 in 2010.

== History ==
Cole was founded on 10 acres (40,000 m^{2}) of land donated by Mrs. A. E. Cunningham and Judge Presley Cole. The town was named "Cole" after it was decided "Cunningham" was too long a name. Cole's first post office, created in 1912, was in the Cunningham home, though it was moved later to Read's General Merchandise Store.

The community was hit by an EF3 tornado on the evening of April 19, 2023, destroying multiple houses and killing two people.

== Geography ==
Cole is in central McClain County, between Blanchard to the northwest, Newcastle to the north, Goldsby to the northeast, Washington to the southeast, and Dibble to the southwest. It is 17 miles (27 km) northwest of Purcell, the McClain county seat, and 31 miles (50 km) south of Oklahoma City. The town is located along State Highway 74B.

According to the U.S. Census Bureau, the town of Cole has a total area of 15.1 square miles (39 km^{2}), of which 0.09 square miles (0.23 km^{2}), or 0.58%, are water. The town is drained by Walnut Creek, which flows southeast to join the Canadian River near the south end of Purcell.

== Demographics ==
Historical population
Census	Pop.	Note	%±
1970	131		—
1980	309		135.9%
1990	355		14.9%
2000	473		33.2%
2010	555		17.3%
2020	624		12.4%
U.S. Decennial Census

=== 2020 census ===
As of the 2020 census, Cole had a population of 624. The median age was 42.3 years. 26.3% of residents were under the age of 18 and 17.1% of residents were 65 years of age or older. For every 100 females there were 98.1 males, and for every 100 females age 18 and over there were 100.0 males age 18 and over.

0.0% of residents lived in urban areas, while 100.0% lived in rural areas.

There were 237 households in Cole, of which 37.6% had children under the age of 18 living in them. Of all households, 65.4% were married-couple households, 13.9% were households with a male householder and no spouse or partner present, and 14.3% were households with a female householder and no spouse or partner present. About 16.0% of all households were made up of individuals and 6.3% had someone living alone who was 65 years of age or older.

There were 247 housing units, of which 4.0% were vacant. The homeowner vacancy rate was 2.3% and the rental vacancy rate was 0.0%.

Racial composition as of the 2020 census
Race	Number	Percent
White	508	81.4%
Black or African American	4	0.6%
American Indian and Alaska Native	35	5.6%
Asian	1	0.2%
Native Hawaiian and Other Pacific Islander	0	0.0%
Some other race	13	2.1%
Two or more races	63	10.1%
Hispanic or Latino (of any race)	36	5.8%

=== 2000 census ===
As of the census of 2000, there were 473 people, 169 households, and 141 families living in the town. The population density was 31.4 inhabitants per square mile (12.1/km^{2}). There were 183 housing units at an average density of 12.1 per square mile (4.7/km^{2}). The racial makeup of the town was 90.27% White, 0.21% African American, 6.55% Native American, 0.63% from other races, and 2.33% from two or more races. Hispanic or Latino of any race were 2.75% of the population.

There were 169 households, out of which 40.2% had children under the age of 18 living with them, 71.0% were married couples living together, 4.7% had a female householder with no husband present, and 16.0% were non-families. 13.0% of all households were made up of individuals, and 4.1% had someone living alone who was 65 years of age or older. The average household size was 2.80 and the average family size was 2.99.

In the town, the population was spread out, with 27.1% under the age of 18, 8.5% from 18 to 24, 30.0% from 25 to 44, 25.6% from 45 to 64, and 8.9% who were 65 years of age or older. The median age was 36 years. For every 100 females, there were 101.3 males. For every 100 females age 18 and over, there were 104.1 males.

The median income for a household in the town was $40,588, and the median income for a family was $41,750. Males had a median income of $29,732 versus $18,542 for females. The per capita income for the town was $14,474. About 10.2% of families and 10.0% of the population were below the poverty line, including 12.9% of those under age 18 and 11.6% of those age 65 or over.

== Education ==
Much of Cole is in the Washington Public Schools school district, while parts to the north are in the Blanchard Public Schools school district, and a western part is in the Dibble Public Schools school district.
