= Oklahoma State Highway 74 =

Highway in Oklahoma

State Highway 74
- SH-74 highlighted in red, suffixed routes in blue

Route information
- Maintained by ODOT
- Existed: 1927 (as SH-44); Became SH-74 in 1931–present

Section 1
- Length: 52.5 mi (84.5 km)
- South end: SH-7 near Tatums
- Major intersections: I-35 in Purcell; US 77 in Purcell
- North end: I-35 in Goldsby

Section 2
- Length: 91.5 mi (147.3 km)
- South end: I-44 / SH-3 / SH-66 in Bethany
- Major intersections: I-344 Toll / Kilpatrick Turnpike near The Village; US 64 / US 412 in Garber; US 60 in Lamont
- North end: SH-11 west of Deer Creek

Location
- Country: United States
- State: Oklahoma

Highway system
- Oklahoma State Highway System; Interstate; US; State; Turnpikes
| ← SH-73 | → US 75 |

State Highway 74, usually abbreviated as SH-74 or OK-74 (or simply Highway 74), is the numbering of two different highways maintained by the U.S. state of Oklahoma. These highways were once a single major north–south route, connecting Oklahoma City to more rural parts of the state. The original road stretched from SH-7 near Tatums to SH-11 west of Deer Creek.

Due to encroaching Interstate highways—especially Interstate 35 (I-35)—the middle section of the route through Norman, Moore and Oklahoma City was decommissioned in 1979 for reasons of redundancy. However, some maps show SH-74 as running concurrently with I-35, I-240 and I-44, thus linking the two sections.

The north section of the route is 91 1/2 miles (147.3 km) in length, while the southern section is 52 1/2 miles (84.5 km) long. This leads to a total length of 144 miles (232 km).

== Route descriptions ==
=== Southern section ===
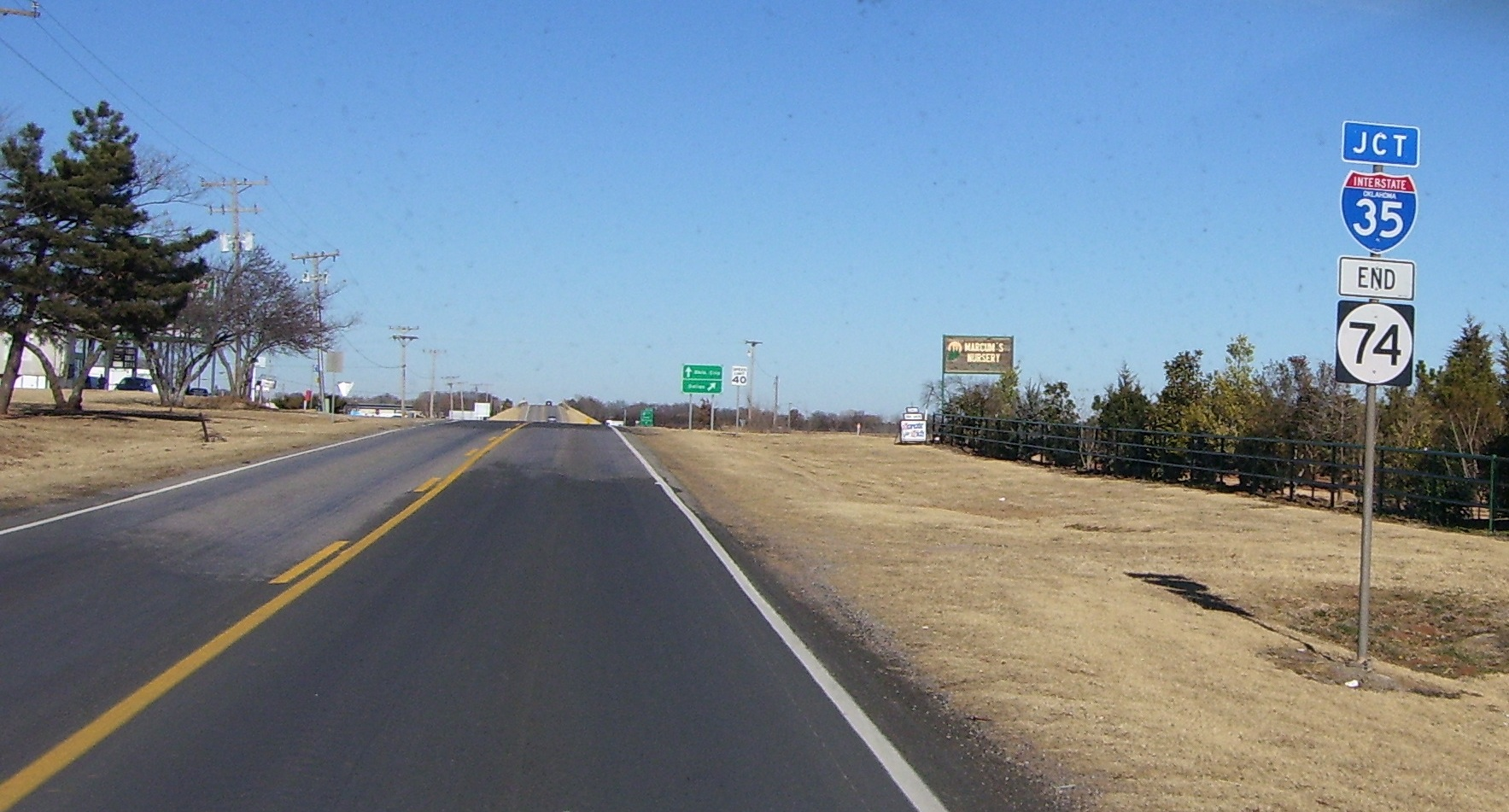
The southern section's northern terminus, at I-35 in Goldsby

From the southern terminus at SH-7, the southern section of SH-74 goes due north to Elmore City, where it intersects with SH-29. After a couple of turns in the Elmore City area, the highway continues due north to Maysville and SH-19. Still continuing northward, the highway meets the southern terminus of SH-24 and continues into Purcell.

In Purcell, SH-74 overlaps U.S. Highway 77 (US 77) and SH-39. It finally splits off and begins heading west. From here, the highway becomes more hilly and curvy as it heads toward Washington. The road never actually enters Washington, passing just one mile (1.6 km) north of it. However, Washington is accessible via SH-24, which has its northern terminus at SH-74 as well. (Both termini of SH-24 are at SH-74.)

The highway then returns to a due north course after its intersection with SH-24. It goes through the town of Goldsby and then ends at I-35. In the future, it will continue as Interstate 335 (I-335).

=== Northern section ===
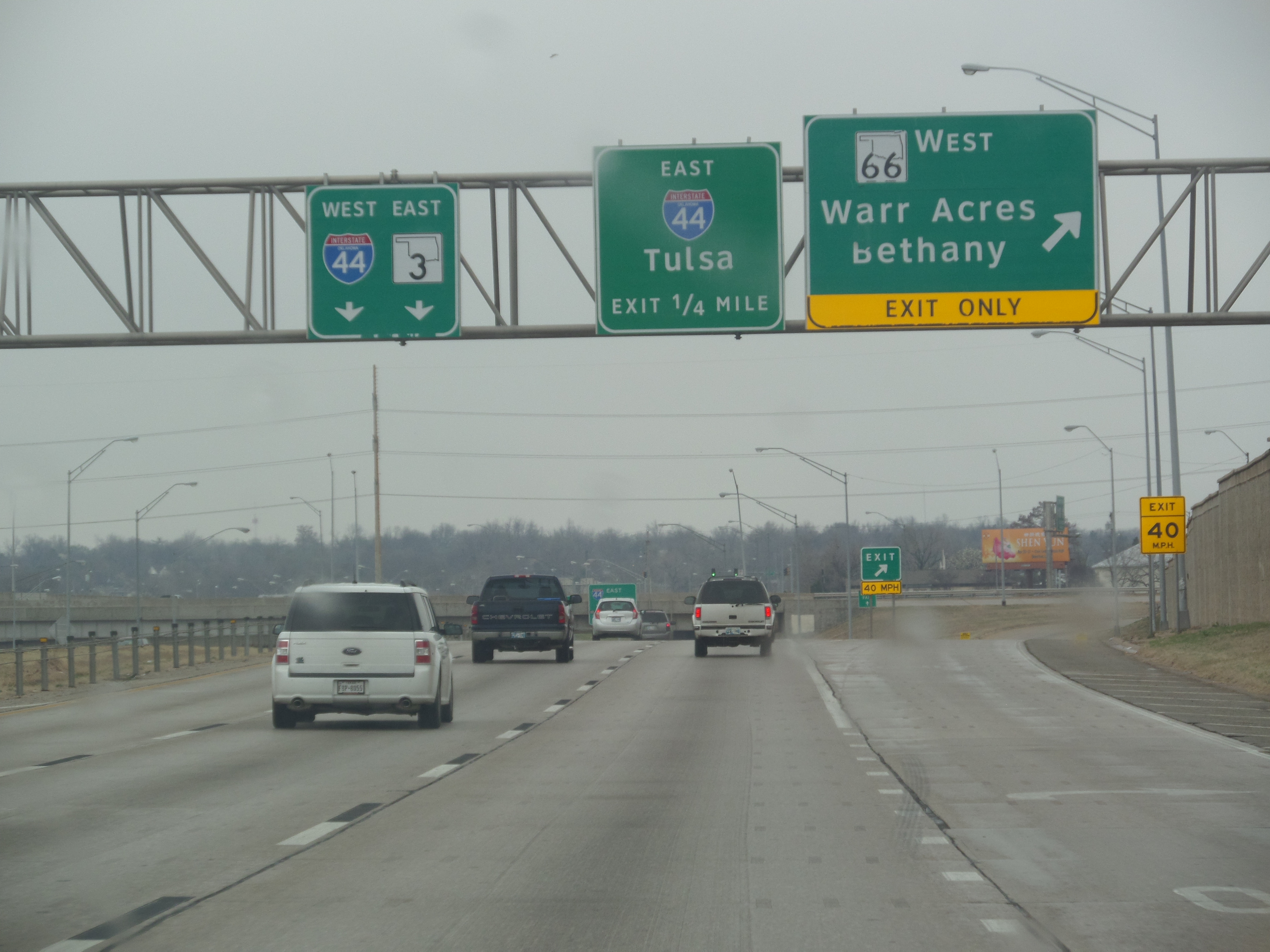
The southern end of the Lake Hefner Parkway in Oklahoma City, Oklahoma at its interchange with I-44

The highway's northern section begins at a combination interchange with I-44 in Bethany. The first part of the northern section is a freeway, called the Lake Hefner Parkway because part of it runs along the east shore of Lake Hefner. The freeway, a major part of the Oklahoma City freeway system, serves the northwestern part of Oklahoma City. The freeway ends at 164th Street, and SH-74 continues northward on Portland Avenue.

The road passes through the towns of Crescent, Covington and Garber, Oklahoma as it continues, again on a due north course. Between Covington and Garber the road intersects with US 64 / US 412 which can be used to access Enid just 14 miles (23 km) to the west.

Twenty miles (32 km) north of US 412, the highway meets US 60 near Lamont. The two roads share a brief concurrency before splitting off again. Eight miles (13 km) north of this, SH-74 intersects with SH-11 between Deer Creek and Numa, Oklahoma. It is at this intersection that the designation ends.

== History ==
Original SH-44 shield

In 1927, a spur from SH-33 to Crescent was created as SH-44. SH-44 was renumbered to SH-74 in 1931. On December 10, 1934, SH-74 was extended southward to Oklahoma City. The highway was further extended on September 9, 1935, to Norman. In 1935 and 1936, the highway's alignment through Norman was modified; it was extended from its Main Street terminus to US 77.

Also in 1936, SH-74 began expanding northward. On August 18, the designation was added to a new section of highway between Crescent and US 64 (now SH-164) in Covington. Nearly a year later, the route was extended southward again. The State Highway Commission lengthened SH-74 through Goldsby and Purcell to SH-19 in Maysville on July 1, 1937. The section of highway from Covington to US-60 in Lamont was added on April 14, 1941. On June 5, 1945, it was extended further south to SH-29 in Elmore City (at the time simply named Elmore).

Throughout the 1950s, SH-74 continued to be realigned and extended. Southwest of Norman, it swapped routings with SH-9 on December 6, 1954. SH-74 was extended twice in 1957, once in each direction: to the north on February 18 and to the south on June 10. The 1957 lengthening brought SH-74 to its greatest length, with its present-day northern terminus and a southern terminus at SH-53 near Milo.

By 1967, I-35 had been constructed through Oklahoma City. On January 4, 1967, SH-74 was split into two sections, with the removal of the section between Goldsby and Norman. The southern section was truncated on December 12, 1974, bringing the highway to its current southern terminus. The gap between the two sections of SH-74 was widened on March 3, 1975, when the route was eliminated through Cleveland County and much of Oklahoma City, bringing SH-74 to its present-day termini.

The Lake Hefner Parkway opened in 1992. SH-74 was transferred to the new freeway on April 6. Between April and July 2001, ODOT installed a Brifen Safety Fence cable barrier along the Lake Hefner Parkway section of SH-74. This installation was the first application of this barrier design in the United States. The freeway was extended from its former terminus just north of the Kilpatrick Turnpike to 164th Street in 2016.

== Spurs ==
SH-74 currently has five spur routes (starting at B, and going up to a suffix of F). Prior to 2009, SH-74A served as a spur route in Norman as well, though it did not intersect SH-74.

=== SH-74A ===
State Highway 74A
- Location: Norman
- Length: 2.76 mi (4.44 km)
- Existed: September 23, 1936–c. 2009

SH-74A ran along Lindsey Street in Norman, connecting I-35 to Classen Boulevard, the contemporary routing of US-77. This highway ran straight through the University of Oklahoma (OU) campus. It was 2.76 miles (4.44 km) long.

SH-74A was established by action of the Highway Commission on September 23, 1936. The highway's original extent was from SH-9/SH-74 (24th Avenue S.W.) to the OU campus, ending at Jenkins Avenue. It was later extended to I-35 in the west and US-77 in the east. It was removed by January 2010.

=== SH-74B ===
State Highway 74B
- Location: McClain County
- Length: 9.95 mi (16.01 km)

SH-74B connects SH-74 in Goldsby to SH-76 south of Blanchard. Cole lies along the middle of this hilly spur.

=== SH-74C ===
State Highway 74C
- Location: Logan County
- Length: 11.59 mi (18.65 km)

SH-74C connects SH-74 in Crescent to US 77 north of Guthrie.

=== SH-74D ===
State Highway 74D
- Location: Lovell
- Length: 2.76 mi (4.44 km)
- Existed: ?–March 5, 2018

SH-74D connected SH-74 to the unincorporated community of Lovell. It was eliminated from the state highway system on March 5, 2018.

=== SH-74E ===
State Highway 74E
- Location: Marshall
- Length: 4.98 mi (8.01 km)

SH-74E goes from SH-51 north to Marshall and then it goes east and ends at SH-74. This spur was commissioned on August 6, 1951.

=== SH-74F ===
State Highway 74F
- Location: Cashion
- Length: 8.05 mi (12.96 km)

SH-74F goes from SH-74 west to Cashion and then goes north to SH-33.

== Junction list ==
=== Southern section ===
| County | Location | mi | km | Destinations | Notes |
|---|---|---|---|---|---|
| Carter | | 0.00 | 0.00 | SH-7 – Davis, Ratliff City | Southern terminus; road continues as Poolville Road |
| Garvin | Elmore City | 9.5 | 15.3 | SH-29 | |
| Garvin | Maysville | 23.1 | 37.2 | SH-19 | |
| Garvin–McClain county line | | 25.7 | 41.4 | SH-24 north (100th Street) | Southern terminus of SH-24 |
| McClain | | 29.7 | 47.8 | SH-59 | |
| McClain | Purcell | 35.0 | 56.3 | I-35 – Oklahoma City, Dallas | I-35 exit 91 |
| McClain | Purcell | 35.3 | 56.8 | US 77 south (Weedn Boulevard) | Southern end of US 77 concurrency |
| McClain | Purcell | 36.2 | 58.3 | SH-39 west (Wyatt Road) | Southern end of SH-39 concurrency |
| McClain | Purcell | 37.3 | 60.0 | US 77 north / SH-39 east (Washington Street) | Northern end of US 77 / SH-39 concurrency |
| McClain | Purcell | 38.4 | 61.8 | To I-35 north / Green Avenue north – Oklahoma City | |
| McClain | Goldsby | 47.0 | 75.6 | SH-24 south – Washington | Northern terminus of SH-24 |
| McClain | Goldsby | 49.0 | 78.9 | SH-74B west | Eastern terminus of SH-74B |
| McClain | Goldsby | 52.5 | 84.5 | I-35 – Oklahoma City, Dallas | Northern terminus of southern section; I-35 exit 104 |
1.000 mi = 1.609 km; 1.000 km = 0.621 mi: Concurrency terminus

=== Northern section ===
| County | Location | mi | km | Exit | Destinations | Notes |
|---|---|---|---|---|---|---|
| Oklahoma | Oklahoma City | 0.00 | 0.00 | | I-44 west / SH-3 east to I-40 | Southern terminus of northern section; southern terminus of Lake Hefner Parkway; southern end of SH-3 concurrency |
| Oklahoma | Oklahoma City | 0.00 | 0.00 | | I-44 east / SH-66 east – Tulsa, Wichita | Southbound exit and northbound entrance |
| Oklahoma | Oklahoma City | 0.00 | 0.00 | 123B | SH-66 west – Warr Acres, Bethany | Exit numbers follow I-44; no exit number southbound |
| Oklahoma | Oklahoma City | 1.1 | 1.8 | | NW 50th Street | |
| Oklahoma | Oklahoma City | 1.8 | 2.9 | | SH-3 west (Northwest Expressway) / SH-3A east | Northern end of SH-3 concurrency |
| Oklahoma | Oklahoma City | 2.4 | 3.9 | | NW 63rd Street | Southbound exit and northbound entrance |
| Oklahoma | Oklahoma City | 4.3 | 6.9 | | W. Britton Road / East Wharf Drive | |
| Oklahoma | Oklahoma City | 5.3 | 8.5 | | W. Hefner Road | |
| Oklahoma | Oklahoma City | 6.4 | 10.3 | | NW 122nd Street | |
| Oklahoma | Oklahoma City | 6.9 | 11.1 | | I-344 Toll east / Kilpatrick Turnpike east | Northbound exit and southbound entrance |
| Oklahoma | Oklahoma City | 7.1 | 11.4 | | I-344 Toll west / Kilpatrick Turnpike west / Memorial Road | Northern terminus of Lake Hefner Parkway |
| Oklahoma | Oklahoma City | 8.1 | 13.0 | | NW 150th Street | |
| Oklahoma | Oklahoma City | | | | NW 164th Street | Northern end of freeway |
| Logan | | 20.4 | 32.8 | | SH-74F west | Eastern terminus of SH-74F |
| Logan | | 25.4 | 40.9 | | SH-33 | |
| Logan | Crescent | 31.4 | 50.5 | | SH-74C east | Western terminus of SH-74C |
| Logan | | 38.4 | 61.8 | | SH-74D west | Eastern terminus of SH-74D |
| Logan | | 42.5 | 68.4 | | SH-51 | |
| Logan | | 45.5 | 73.2 | | SH-74E | |
| Garfield | Covington | 55.4 | 89.2 | | SH-164 east | Western terminus of SH-164 |
| Garfield | Garber | 61.9 | 99.6 | | US 64 / US 412 – Enid, Perry SH-15 begins | Southern end of SH-15 concurrency; diamond interchange with US 64 / US 412; western terminus of SH-15 |
| Garfield | | 71.4 | 114.9 | | SH-15 east – Ponca City, Billings | Northern end of SH-15 concurrency |
| Grant | | 81.6 | 131.3 | | US 60 west | Southern end of US 60 concurrency |
| Grant | Lamont | 83.5 | 134.4 | | US 60 east | Northern end of US 60 concurrency |
| Grant | | 91.5 | 147.3 | | SH-11 – Medford, Blackwell | Northern terminus; road continues as CR 1060 (unsigned) |
1.000 mi = 1.609 km; 1.000 km = 0.621 mi: Concurrency terminus; Electronic toll collection; Incomplete access
