= Woody Chapel, Oklahoma =

Community in McClain County, Oklahoma, U.S.

Woody Chapel
- Unincorporated community
- Location within Oklahoma Location within the United States
- Coordinates: 35°0′54″N 97°29′38″W
- Country: United States
- State: Oklahoma
- County: McClain
- Time zone: UTC-6 (Central (CST))
  - Summer (DST): UTC-5 (CDT)
- ZIP Code: 73080 (Purcell)

Woody Chapel is an unincorporated community in McClain County, Oklahoma, United States. It is located at the junction of State Highways 24 and 39. It is near Dibble and Purcell, and its residents are listed in the local Purcell phone book. The name comes from a general store and gas station, now closed, located along Highway 24.

Woody Chapel suffered wind damage from a tornado on April 10, 1979.
