= Oklahoma State Highway 39 =

State highway in Oklahoma, United States

State Highway 39

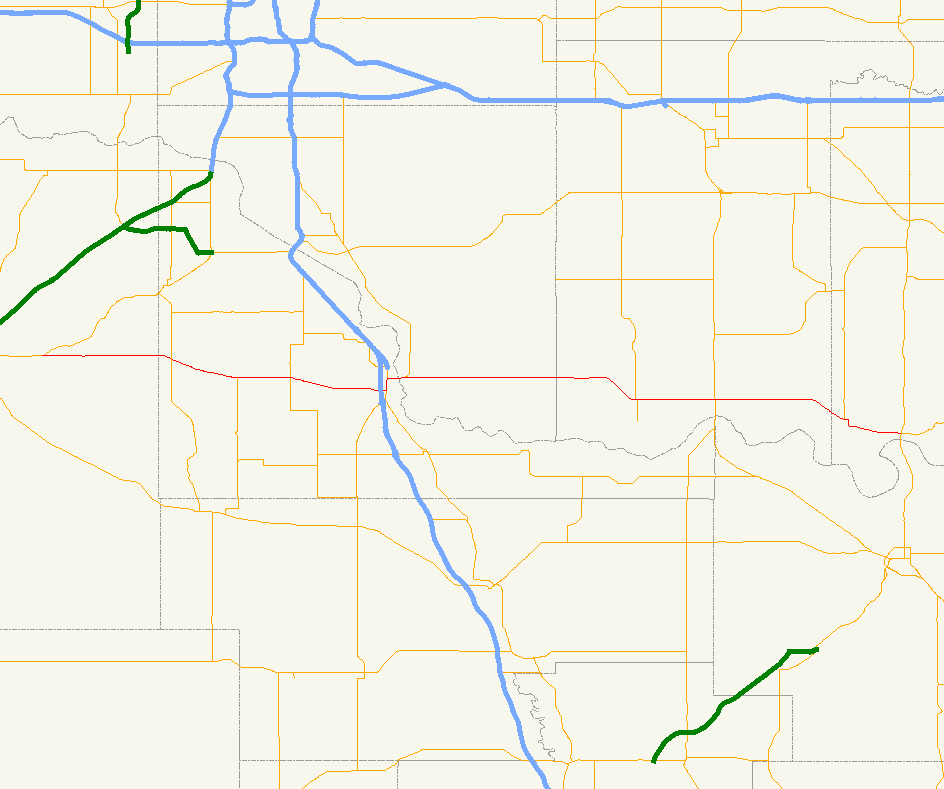

Route information
- Maintained by ODOT
- Length: 68.4 mi (110.1 km)
- Existed: ca. 1936–present

Major junctions
- West end: US 62 / US 277 / SH-9 east of Chickasha
- US 77 from Purcell to Lexington; US 177 / SH-3W / SH-59 in Asher
- East end: US 377 / SH-3E / SH-99 east of Konawa mainline becomes SH-56

Location
- Country: United States
- State: Oklahoma

Highway system
- Oklahoma State Highway System; Interstate; US; State; Turnpikes
← SH-38	→ I-40

State Highway 39, abbreviated as SH-39, is a state highway in the U.S. state of Oklahoma. It is 68.4 miles (110.1 km) in length. It runs east–west through the central part of the state, beginning at unincorporated Tabler, east of Chickasha, and ending east of Konawa. Along the way, SH-39 serves the counties of Grady, McClain, Cleveland, Pottawatomie, and Seminole. It currently has no lettered spurs.

SH-39 was built in 1923 but not added to the state highway system until approximately 1936. Originally connecting Tabler to Purcell, SH-39 was extended to the east over the next five years, first to Asher and then to Konawa.

== Route description ==
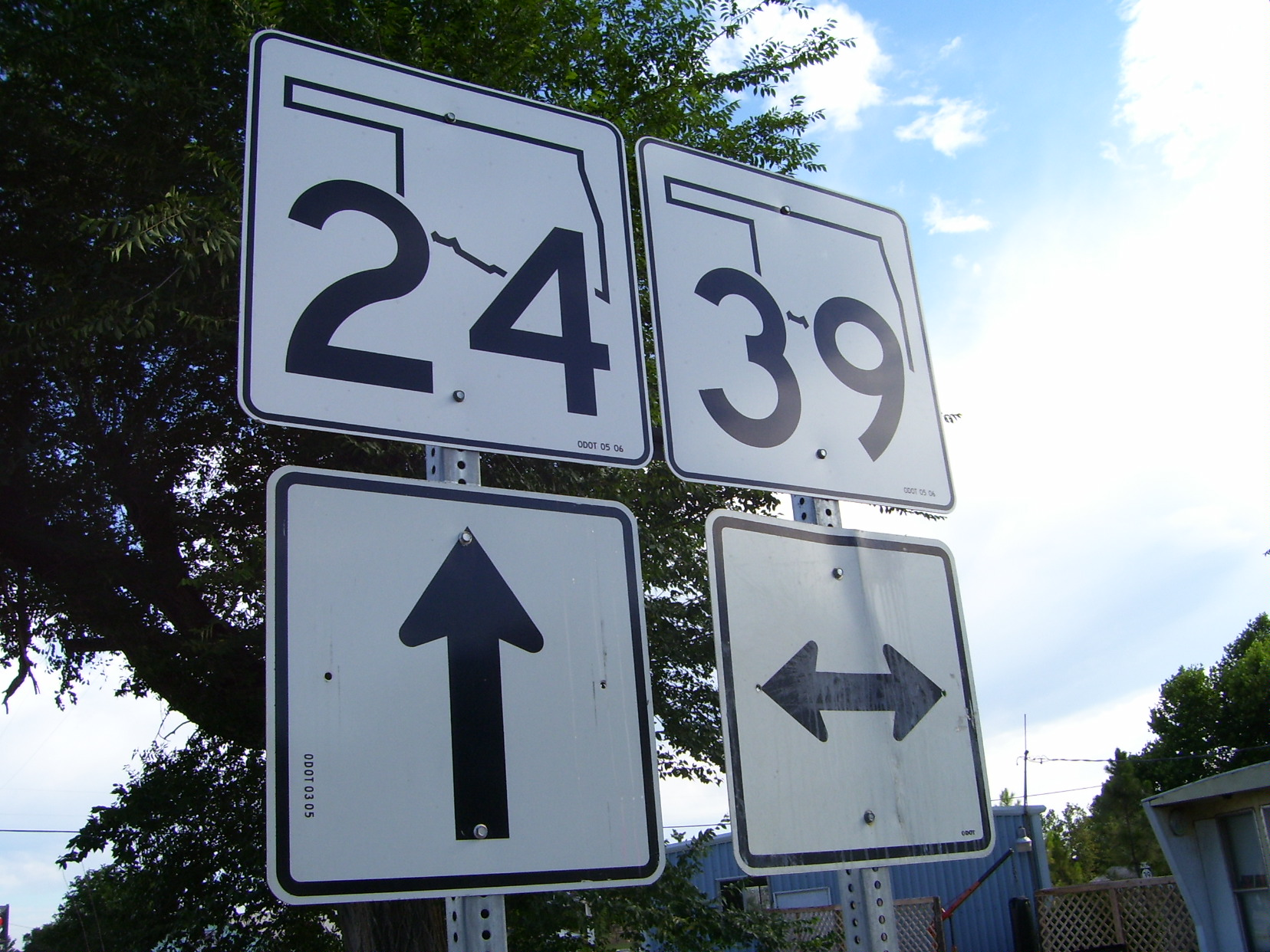
SH-39 shield on SH-24 near their intersection.

The highway begins at the concurrency of U.S. Highway 62 (US-62)/US-277/State Highway 9 (SH-9) near the unincorporated community of Tabler, east of Chickasha. The road begins traveling east from there, intersecting SH-76 ten miles (16 km) later west of Dibble. From Dibble, it continues east, meeting the eastern terminus of SH-59 and intersecting SH-24 in the unincorporated town of Woody Chapel. It then continues east to Purcell.

In Purcell, SH-39 passes under Interstate 35, but does not have a junction with it. The highway soon encounters US-77/SH-74 just east of the interstate. Here, it turns northward and begins an overlap with the two highways through Purcell. SH-74 splits off after a few blocks while SH-39 and US-77 turn eastward and cross over the Canadian River on the James C. Nance Memorial Bridge. After crossing the river, the highways arrive in the town of Lexington and US-77 splits off to the northeast.

SH-39 continues eastward, serving the Lexington prison and overlapping for less than a mile with SH-102. In the town of Asher, the highway intersects SH-3W and SH-59 again. Eleven miles (18 km) later, the highway meets SH-9A in Konawa. The highway ends four miles (6.4 km) east of Konawa at US-377/SH-3E/SH-99. The mainline of the highway becomes SH-56.

== History ==
The road that would become SH-39 was built in 1923, but it was not assigned a state route number until at least late 1936, first appearing on the 1937 state map. Originally, the route's eastern terminus was at US-77 in Purcell. By April 1939, it had been extended eastward to end at Asher. The route first reached its current termini in 1941 (although at the time, SH-99 passed through Konawa). A short gap existed west of Asher in the SH-39 designation between 1946 and 1947; by 1948 this gap had been filled. The final change to SH-39 occurred in 1968 or 1969, when SH-99 was rerouted to bypass Konawa, and SH-39 was extended east of town to end at the present junction. No changes have been made since.

== Spurs ==
SH-39 once had one spur route, SH-39B. It ran along what is now May Avenue from SH-39's junction with SH-59 to SH-74B east of Cole, Oklahoma.

== Junction list ==
County	Location	mi	km	Destinations	Notes
Grady	Tabler	0.0	0.0	US 62 / US 277 / SH-9	Western terminus
McClain	Dibble	9.6	15.4	SH-76	
McClain		14.9	24.0	SH-59 east	Western terminus of SH-59
McClain	Woody Chapel	18.9	30.4	SH-24	
McClain	Purcell	26.3	42.3	US 77 / SH-74 south (Green Avenue) to I-35	Western end of US-77/SH-74 concurrency
McClain	Purcell	27.4	44.1	SH-74 north (Green Avenue)	Eastern end of SH-74 concurrency
Cleveland	Lexington	28.7	46.2	US 77 south	Eastern end of US-77 concurrency
Pottawatomie		46.9	75.5	SH-102 north (Drummond Road)	Western end of SH-102 concurrency
Pottawatomie		47.1	75.8	SH-102 south	Eastern end of SH-102 concurrency
Pottawatomie	Asher	53.0	85.3	US 177 / SH-3W / SH-59	
Seminole	Konawa	63.4	102.0	SH-9A north	Southern terminus of SH-9A
Seminole		68.4	110.1	SH-56 north / US 377 / SH-3E / SH-99	Eastern terminus; road continues as SH-56
1.000 mi = 1.609 km; 1.000 km = 0.621 mi: Concurrency terminus; Route transition		68.4	110.1		
