= Oklahoma State Highway 9 =

Highway in Oklahoma

State Highway 9

Route information
- Maintained by ODOT
- Length: 348.1 mi (560.2 km)
- Existed: August 24, 1924–present

Major junctions
- West end: SH 203 at the Texas state line near Vinson
- US 183 in Hobart; US 281 / SH-8 in Anadarko; I-44 / H.E. Bailey Turnpike in Chickasha; I-35 in Norman; US 77 in Norman; US 75 in Wetumka; Indian Nation Turnpike near Vernon; US 69 in Eufaula; US 59 near Keota
- East end: I-540 / US 271 at the Arkansas state line near Fort Smith, AR

Location
- Country: United States
- State: Oklahoma

Highway system
- Oklahoma State Highway System; Interstate; US; State; Turnpikes
← SH-8	→ SH-10

State Highway 9, abbreviated as SH-9, OK-9, or simply Highway 9, is a major east–west highway in the U.S. state of Oklahoma. Spanning across the central part of the state, SH-9 begins at the Texas state line west of Vinson, Oklahoma, and ends at the Arkansas state line near Fort Smith, Arkansas. State Highway 9 is a major highway around the Norman area. At 348.1 miles (560.2 km), SH-9 is Oklahoma's second-longest state highway (second to State Highway 3).

== Route description ==
=== West of Interstate 35 ===
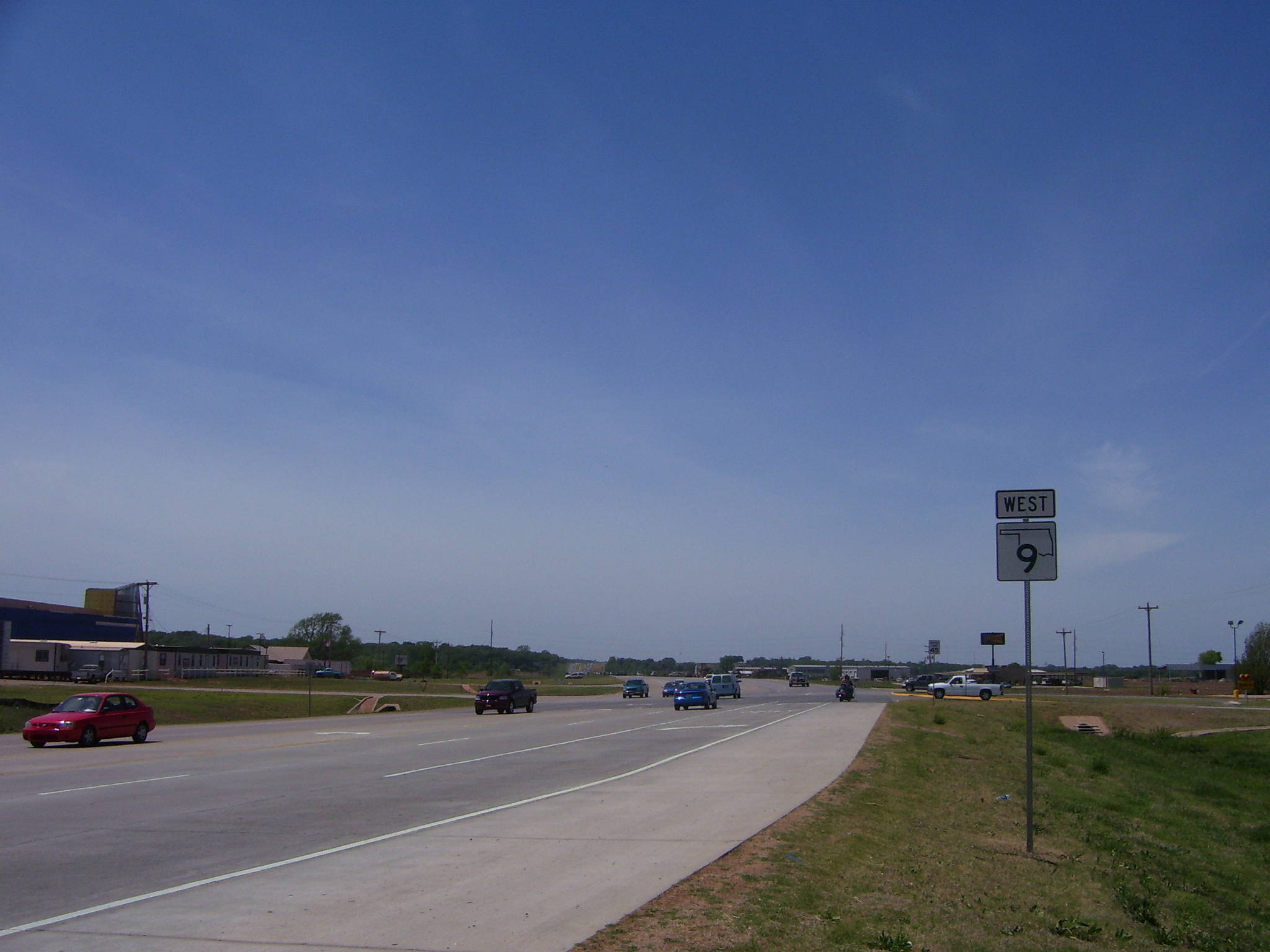
A new SH-9 sign, of the 2006 design, just west of I-35 in Goldsby

From the western terminus at State Highway 203 along the Texas border, the highway travels due east for five miles (8.0 km) and intersects with SH-30 between Madge and Vinson. SH-9 continues east for 23 miles (37 km) without intersecting another highway until meeting US-283 and SH-34 two miles (3.2 km) north of Mangum. The highway overlaps the other two routes for four miles (6.4 km), going north, before splitting off and heading east again through Granite and Lone Wolf. East of Lone Wolf, the highway forms a concurrency with SH-44. Near Hobart, SH-9 overlaps US-183 for 4 miles (6.4 km)(again going northward) before splitting off again.

Continuing east, SH-9 passes through Gotebo, Mountain View, and Carnegie. Around Fort Cobb, Oklahoma, the highway begins nine miles (14 km) of travel to the south. There, the route links up with the concurrent U.S. Highways 62 and 281. While US-281 will split off in Anadarko, SH-9 and US-62 remain concurrent until Newcastle. In Chickasha, US-277 joins to form another three-route concurrency with US-62 and SH-9. On the eastern edge of Chickasha, US-62/277/SH-9 have an interchange with I-44, or more commonly known as the H.E. Bailey Turnpike.

Traveling northeast from Chickasha, US-62/277/SH-9 are routed to the town of Blanchard. Four miles later, SH-9 splits away from the two U.S. routes at a diamond interchange that also serves as the eastern terminus of the H.E. Bailey Turnpike Spur. SH-9 remains without any concurrent routes until Goldsby. The section of road east of US-62/277, recently upgraded to a four-lane divided highway, provides a link from the H.E. Bailey Turnpike Spur to Interstate 35. At the interstate, SH-9 merges onto I-35 northbound to cross the Canadian River into Norman.

=== East of Interstate 35 ===
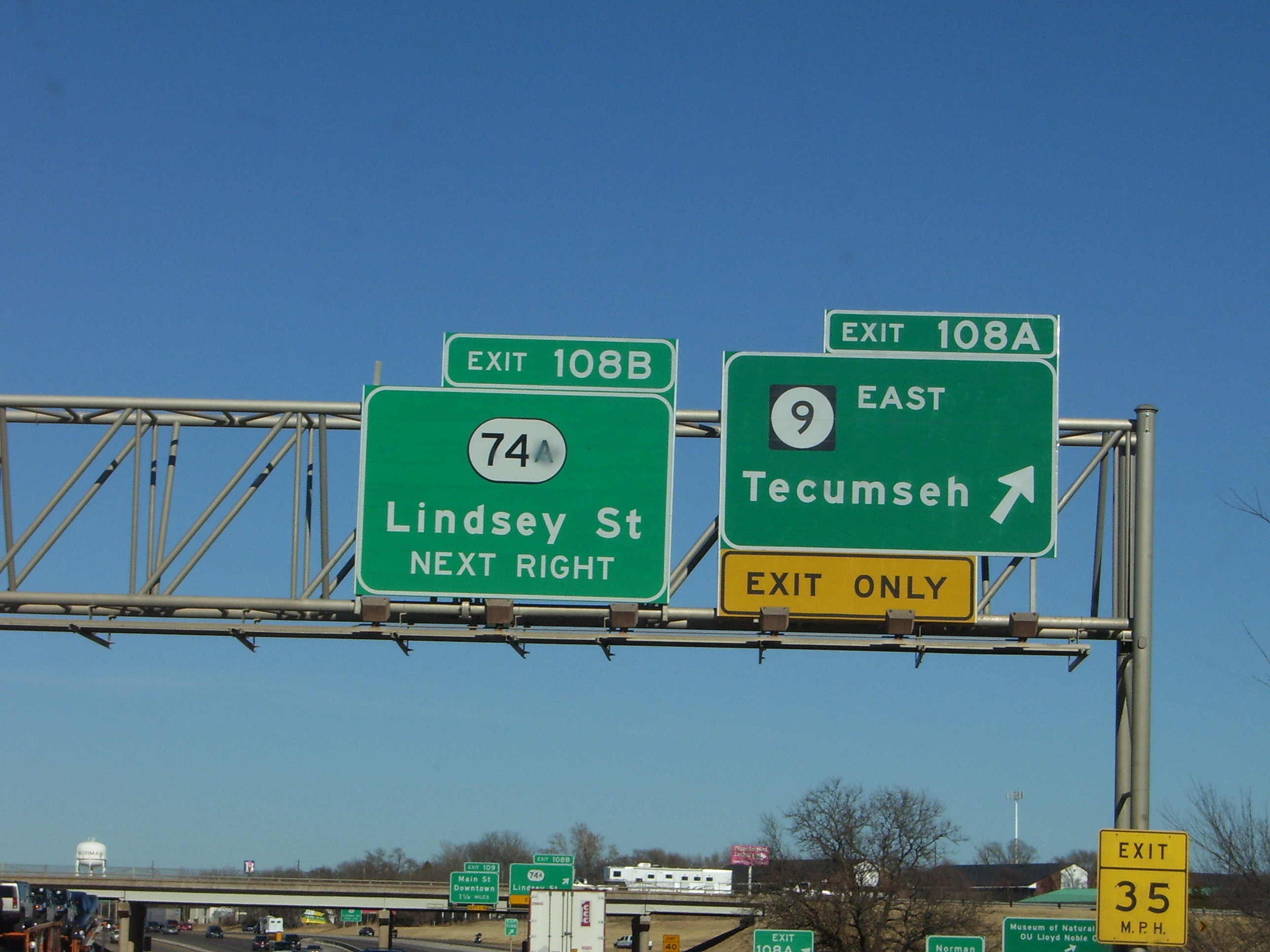
SH-9 East exiting from I-35 in Norman. The exit has since been reconfigured and SH-74A has been decommissioned.

Through Norman, Highway 9 serves as a major artery providing access to the University of Oklahoma campus (in particular, the Lloyd Noble Center). Around the area, the route is a four-lane divided expressway (with surface crossings and stoplights). There is an interchange with US-77, and after 108th Avenue SE, the road becomes a two lane highway again.

SH-9 continues eastward, passing Lake Thunderbird State Park, before reaching the towns of Tecumseh and Seminole. The road intersects the Indian Nation Turnpike near Hanna, and US-69 near Eufaula. SH-9 provides access to the south side of Lake Eufaula before reaching Stigler.

SH-9 overlaps US-59 for 5 miles (8.0 km), after which the road becomes concurrent with US-271. Both remain concurrent, until the highway ends at the Arkansas border. After passing the Arkansas state line, State Highway 9 becomes I-540, and US-271 continues over the state line concurrent with the Interstate.

== History ==
Original SH-9 shield

Officially designated on August 24, 1924, the original route encompassed all of current SH-9 west of Blanchard. East of Blanchard, SH-9 followed a more northerly route. Bypassing Norman, SH-9 ran north to Oklahoma City before going east through Harrah, Meeker, Prague, Henryetta, and Checotah. The highway ended at the original SH-3 in Spiro. Upon the creation of the United States Numbered Routes system in 1926, the section between Oklahoma City and Warner was overlaid with US-266. Four years later in 1930, SH-9 was truncated to Chickasha. By this time, much of the route had become part of US-62.

On 1935-08-27, the route was extended eastward, taking over the original SH-37. SH-9's eastern terminus became SH-48 near Seminole. On 1937-08-25, the route was brought further east to end at US-69 in Eufaula. Part of the newly commissioned section was rescinded on 1937-10-19, when a small segment just east of SH-48 and the entire Hughes County portion were dropped from the highway. These sections were re-added on 1938-09-27.

SH-9 was extended eastward twice in the route's history. The first extension occurred on 1941-02-26, and extended SH-9 to SH-2 at Whitefield. The final extension brought SH-9 to the Arkansas state line on 1941-11-12. The only major realignment in SH-9's history since 1941 was the Norman expressway bypass, which was designated as SH-9 on 1971-11-08.

After the I-40 bridge disaster, parts of SH-9 in eastern Oklahoma served as an emergency detour for eastbound I-40 traffic. All eastbound traffic was routed along the section of SH-9 between SH-2 in Whitefield and US-59. In addition, the section of SH-9 between US-59 and the Arkansas state line were used for eastbound traffic for commercial trucks.

Discussions to widen SH-9 to four lanes east of US-77 in Norman began in 2008. The City of Norman and ODOT have conflict in their proposals for the design of the widened highway. ODOT has proposed a 16-foot (4.9 m) paved median, with 12-foot (3.7 m) shoulders to accommodate bicyclists. Norman's proposal includes a grass median and a separate bike path along the north side of the right-of-way, running from 24th Avenue S.E. to Lake Thunderbird. ODOT criticized the city's plan as too expensive. The city then proposed, with a narrower raised concrete median and separate bike path. By 2014, the plan for the widening had been finalized and work had begun from US 77 eastward. As of 2026, SH-9 has been widened to four lanes to 108th Avenue S.E. Future plans call for the highway to be widened to four lanes from Pecan Creek to SH-102.

The I-35 and SH-9 West interchange in Goldsby was reconfigured into a diverging diamond interchange in November 2025. The new design is expected to "accommodate large volumes of turning traffic by shifting traffic to the left side of a divided roadway through a series of coordinated signals for safer and more efficient left turns." This follows a large project that reconfigured the I-35 exit at West Lindsey Street into a single point urban interchange and the SH-9 east exit to a trumpet interchange in Norman. That project started in March 2015 and was completed and opened in October 2017.

== Junction list ==
County	Location	mi	km	Destinations	Notes
Harmon		0.00	0.00	SH 203 west – Wellington	Continuation into Texas
Harmon		4.9	7.9	SH-30 – Erick, Hollis	
Greer		28.3	45.5	US 283 south / SH-34 south – Mangum, Altus	Western end of US-283/SH-34 concurrency
Greer		32.0	51.5	US 283 north / SH-34 north	Eastern end of US-283/SH-34 concurrency
Greer	Granite	39.2	63.1	SH-6 – Elk City, Altus	
North Fork Red River				Bridge	
Kiowa	Lone Wolf	47.6	76.6	SH-44 south – Altus	Western end of SH-44 concurrency
Kiowa		50.8	81.8	SH-44 north – Sentinel	Eastern end of SH-44 concurrency
Kiowa	Hobart	55.9	90.0	SH-9 Bus. west – Business District	Southern terminus of SH-9 Bus.
Kiowa	Hobart	57.9	93.2	US 183 south – Roosevelt	Southern end of US-183 concurrency
Kiowa		58.9	94.8	SH-9 Bus. east	Eastern terminus of SH-9 Bus.
Kiowa		61.9	99.6	US 183 north – Rocky, Cordell	Northern end of US-183 concurrency
Kiowa	Gotebo	72.9	117.3	SH-54 – Weatherford	
Kiowa	Mountain View	80.0	128.7	SH-115 north	Western end of SH-115 concurrency
Kiowa		81.2	130.7	SH-115 south – Saddle Mountain	Eastern end of SH-115 concurrency
Caddo	Carnegie	88.5	142.4	SH-58 (Carnegie Street) – Hydro, Lawton	
Caddo	Fort Cobb	98.2	158.0	SH-146 north – Binger	Southern terminus of SH-146
Caddo		106.3	171.1	US 62 west / US 281 south – Apache, Lawton	Western end of US-62/281 concurrency
Caddo	Anadarko	114.7	184.6	US 281 north / SH-8 north (First Street)	Eastern end of US-281 concurrency, western end of SH-8 concurrency
Caddo	Anadarko	115.3	185.6	SH-8 south (SE Seventh Street)	Eastern end of SH-8 concurrency
Grady	Chickasha	131.1	211.0	US 81 north – El Reno, Chickasha Municipal Airport	Western end of US-81 concurrency
Grady	Chickasha	132.8	213.7	US 81 south / US 277 south (4th Street)	Eastern end of US-81 concurrency, southern end of US-277 concurrency
Grady	Chickasha	134.4	216.3	I-44 (H.E. Bailey Turnpike) – Lawton, Oklahoma City	Diamond interchange; I-44 exit 83
Grady		136.1	219.0	SH-92 north – Tuttle, Friend	Southern terminus of SH-92
Grady	Tabler	139.6	224.7	SH-39 east – Purcell	Western terminus of SH-39
McClain	Blanchard	150.4	242.0	SH-76 south – Lindsay	Southern end of SH-76 concurrency
McClain	Blanchard	151.4	243.7	SH-76 north (Main Street)	
McClain	Blanchard–Newcastle line	156.1	251.2	US 62 east / US 277 north – Oklahoma City, Newcastle	Diamond interchange; eastern end of US-62/US-277 concurrency
McClain	Newcastle	156.1	251.2	SH-4 Toll north / H.E. Bailey Turnpike (Spur) – Mustang, Chickasha	Interchange; left exit westbound, left entrance eastbound; southern terminus of SH-4/H.E. Bailey Tpke. Norman Spur
McClain	Newcastle–Goldsby line	162.1	260.9	I-35 south – Dallas, Fort Worth	Diverging diamond interchange; I-35 exit 106; southern end of I-35 concurrency
Canadian River				Samuel King McCall Memorial Bridge	
Cleveland	Norman	163.7	263.4	I-35 north – Oklahoma City	Trumpet interchange; I-35 exit 108A; northern end of I-35 concurrency
Cleveland	Norman	168.0	270.4	US 77 – Norman, Purcell	Parclo interchange
Pottawatomie		190.6	306.7	SH-102	
Pottawatomie	Tecumseh			Broadway Avenue to US 177 north / US 270 west (SH-3W west)	
Pottawatomie	Tecumseh	198.4	319.3	US 177 / SH-3W – Ada	Interchange; no direct access to US-177 north/SH-3W west
Pottawatomie	Tecumseh			US 270 west to US 177 north / SH-3W west – Shawnee, Oklahoma City	Interchange; Western end of US-270 concurrency; westbound exit and eastbound left entrance
Pottawatomie		203.6	327.7	SH-9A south – Harjo, Maud	Western end of SH-9A concurrency
Pottawatomie	Earlsboro	204.8	329.6	SH-9A north – Earlsboro	Eastern end of SH-9A concurrency
Seminole	Seminole	212.5	342.0	SH-3E west – Shawnee	Western end of SH-3E concurrency
Seminole	Seminole	214.5	345.2	US 377 north / SH-99 north (Jimmie Austin Avenue) – Prague, Stroud US 377 south / SH-99 south / SH-3E east (Milt Phillips Avenue) – Ada, Seminole	Eastern end of SH-3E concurrency
Seminole	Seminole			US 270 east (Harvey Road)	Eastern end of US-270 concurrency
Seminole		224.6	361.5	SH-56 – Okemah, Wewoka	
Hughes		228.0	366.9	SH-48 – Bearden, Holdenville	
Hughes		235.0	378.2	SH-27 north – Okemah	Southern terminus of SH-27
Hughes	Wetumka	237.3	381.9	US 75 – Tulsa, Durant	
Hughes	Dustin	250.5	403.1	SH-84 north – Weleetka	Southern terminus of SH-84
McIntosh		256.3	412.5	SH-375 Toll (Turnpike) – McAlester, Hugo, Henryetta, Tulsa	INT exit 92
McIntosh		259.2	417.1	SH-52 south – Hanna	Northern terminus of SH-52
McIntosh	Eufaula	276.4	444.8	US 69 – McAlester, Muskogee	Parclo interchange
McIntosh	Eufaula	277.1	445.9	US 69 Bus. north (Main Street north)	Northern end of US-69 Bus. concurrency
McIntosh	Eufaula	278.1	447.6	US 69 Bus. south (Main Street south)	Southern end of US-69 Bus. concurrency
Eufaula Lake				Bridge	
Pittsburg	Longtown	281.5	453.0	SH-9A west – Carlton Landing, McAlester	Eastern terminus of SH-9A
Haskell	Enterprise	291.9	469.8	SH-71 – Quinton, Eufaula Dam	
Haskell	Whitefield	300.3	483.3	SH-2 – Muskogee, Kinta	
Haskell	Stigler	306.8	493.7	SH-82 south (S.E. 3rd Street)	Northern terminus of SH-82
Haskell		316.6	509.5	SH-26 south – McCurtain	Northern terminus of SH-26
Le Flore		328.2	528.2	US 59 north to I-40 – Sallisaw	Western end of US-59 concurrency
Le Flore		333.7	537.0	US 59 south / US 271 south – Poteau	Eastern end of US-59 concurrency, western end of US-271 concurrency
Le Flore		343.2	552.3	SH-9A east – Arkoma	Western terminus of SH-9A
Le Flore	Pocola	345.4	555.9	SH-112 south (Pocola Boulevard) – Poteau	Western end of SH-112 concurrency
Le Flore	Pocola	347.4	559.1	SH-112 north – Arkoma	West end of freeway; eastern end of SH-112 concurrency
Le Flore	Pocola	348.1	560.2	US 271 north	Continuation north into Arkansas; eastern end of US-271 concurrency
1.000 mi = 1.609 km; 1.000 km = 0.621 mi: Concurrency terminus; Tolled

== Spurs ==
State Highway 9 creates three spur highways throughout the state. Additionally, it has two business routes, serving towns the main route bypasses. These routes are:

- Business SH-9, a three-mile (5 km) loop through Hobart.
- Another instance of Business SH-9 that loops through Gotebo. (This is not shown on the state highway map.)

SH-9A shield

- SH-9A is a designation for three distinct highways:
  - A highway that intersects SH-9 in Earlsboro and links the parent highway to I-40 and SH-39 in Konawa. The spur also passes through the town of Maud.
  - A connector highway from US-69 to SH-9 south of Eufaula.
  - A spur route to SH-112 in Arkoma. This section is a former alignment of U.S. Highway 271.
