= Kiowa, Chickasha and Fort Smith Railway =

Overview
- Locale: Oklahoma
- Dates of operation: 1899–1904

Technical
- Track gauge: 4 ft 8 1/2 in (1,435 mm)
- Length: 24.2 mi (38.9 km)

The Kiowa, Chickasha and Fort Smith Railway (KC&FS) came about when the Atchison, Topeka and Santa Fe Railway (AT&SF) and the Chicago, Rock Island and Pacific Railroad (Rock Island) decided to build an interchange linking their systems at a point halfway between the towns of Chickasha and Pauls Valley in what is now the State of Oklahoma. Toward that goal, the AT&SF incorporated The Kiowa, Chickasha and Fort Smith Railway Company in Kansas on July 13, 1899, which then built a line from Pauls Valley to what became the town of Lindsay, a distance of 24.2 miles, in the 1901-1903 timeframe. The line’s first operation was in December of 1903.

The new railway, operated by another AT&SF affiliate, the Gulf, Colorado and Santa Fe Railway, joined the Rock Island line built about 1903 from Chickasha to Lindsay, 24.8 miles. The AT&SF trains from Pauls Valley turned around at Lindsay, and the Rock Island trains from Chickasha did the same.

The town of Lindsay was established because of the impending railroad junction in January, 1902. And, the town of Beef Creek was relocated a mile north to be alongside the tracks. When that town’s post office relocated in September of 1902, it changed its name to Maysville.

Following approval by act of Congress on March 11, 1904, the line was sold to another AT&SF affiliate, the Eastern Oklahoma Railway, on March 14, 1904. In subsequent history, the Eastern Oklahoma Railway was sold to the AT&SF on June 20, 1907. Both the Rock Island and AT&SF portions of the line between Chickasha and Pauls Valley were abandoned in 1942.
