= Oklahoma State Highway 76 =

Highway in Oklahoma

State Highway 76

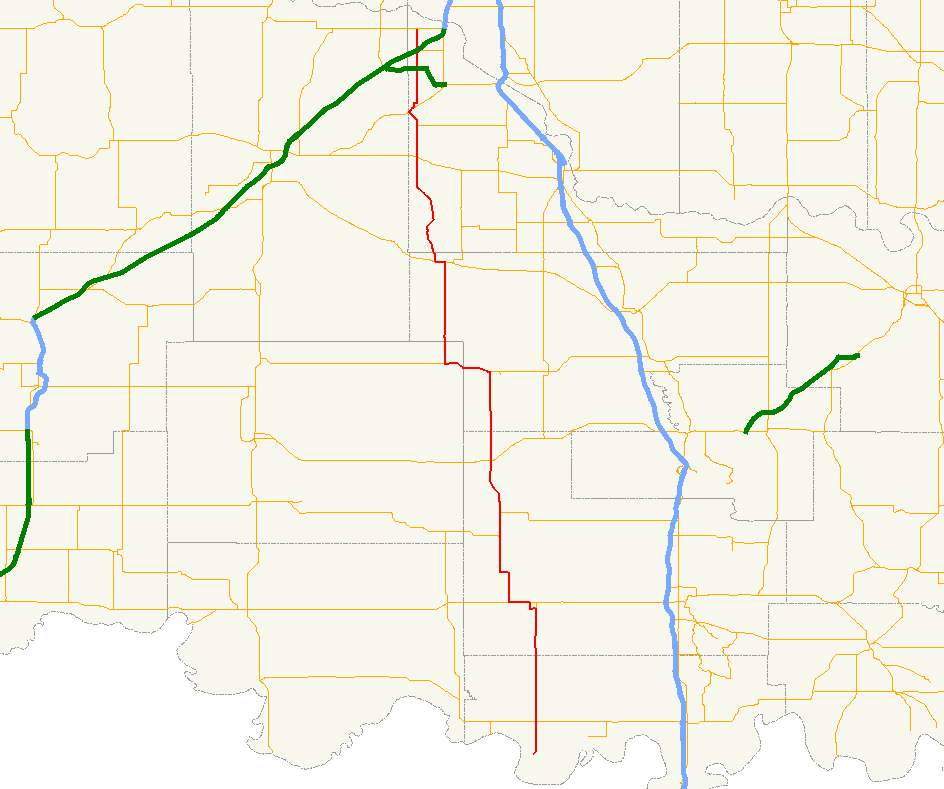
- SH-76 highlighted in red

Route information
- Maintained by ODOT
- Length: 110.6 mi (178.0 km)

Major junctions
- South end: South of Leon
- US 70 in Wilson; US 62 / US 277 / SH-9 in Blanchard; SH-4 Toll / H.E. Bailey Turnpike Spur near Newcastle
- North end: SH-37 north of Newcastle

Location
- Country: United States
- State: Oklahoma

Highway system
- Oklahoma State Highway System; Interstate; US; State; Turnpikes
← US 75	→ US 77

State Highway 76, abbreviated as SH-76, is a highway maintained by the U.S. state of Oklahoma. It is 110.6 miles (178.0 km) long. It runs north–south through central Oklahoma, beginning at Jimtown Road just north of the Red River and ending north of Newcastle at SH-37. It has no lettered spur routes.

== Route description ==
SH-76 begins north of the Texas border in Love County, south of Leon. After passing through that town, it has its first highway intersection, with State Highway 32. It continues northward from there for 15 miles (24.1 km) to Wilson. SH-76 runs along that town's main street, while SH-70A provides an eastern bypass. West of Wilson, SH-76 has a two-mile (3 km) concurrency with US-70, after which it splits off and runs through Healdton. It then has a three-mile (5 km) concurrency with SH-53 and then meets SH-7 at Ratliff City.

Four miles north of Ratliff City, SH-76 overlaps for five miles (8 km) with SH-29, before splitting off to the north to SH-19, which it overlaps with through Lindsay. Fifteen miles north of here, it has a four-way-stop controlled intersection with SH-39 west of Dibble. It continues north from there to have a brief concurrency with US-62/277 through Blanchard. SH-76 then has an interchange with the H.E. Bailey Turnpike Spur, and then meets the western terminus of State Highway 130 west of Newcastle. It then passes under Interstate 44 (but does not have an interchange with it) and ends at SH-37.

== History ==
SH-76 first appeared on the 1932 state highway map, originally running from US-70 south of Healdton to SH-22 (now SH-7) at Ratliff City. Between May 1936 and April 1937, the highway was extended northward, all the way to the intersection with US-62/277 southwest of Blanchard. In 1947 or 1948, the route was extended southward through Wilson to end at the Carter/Love county line. SH-76 was extended further south in 1955 or 1956, bringing to SH-32; by 1957 it had its current southern terminus. By 1957 had also been extended northward to its present northern terminus at SH-37.

== Junction list ==
County	Location	mi	km	Destinations	Notes
Love	Leon	0.0	0.0	Jimtown Road	Southern terminus
Love		5.6	9.0	SH-32	
Carter	Wilson	21.0	33.8	SH-70A	Southern terminus of SH-70A
Carter	Wilson	22.3	35.9	US 70	Eastern end of US-70 concurrency
Carter	Healdton	24.8	39.9	US 70	Western end of US-70 concurrency
Carter		34.6	55.7	SH-53	Southern end of SH-53 concurrency
Carter	Fox	37.7	60.7	SH-53	Northern end of SH-53 concurrency
Carter	Ratliff City	45.0	72.4	SH-7	
Garvin		57.1	91.9	SH-29	Eastern end of SH-29 concurrency
Stephens		62.4	100.4	SH-29	Western end of SH-29 concurrency
Garvin	Lindsay	76.2	122.6	SH-19	Eastern end of SH-19 concurrency
Garvin	Lindsay	77.2	124.2	SH-19	Western end of SH-19 concurrency
McClain	Dibble	92.3	148.5	SH-39	
McClain		96.6	155.5	SH-74B	
McClain	Blanchard	98.7	158.8	US 62 / US 277 / SH-9	Southern end of US-62/US-277/SH-9 concurrency
McClain	Blanchard	99.7	160.5	US 62 / US 277 / SH-9	Northern end of US-62/US-277/SH-9 concurrency
McClain		105.2	169.3	SH-4 Toll / H.E. Bailey Turnpike Spur	Parclo interchange
McClain	Newcastle	107.6	173.2	SH-130	Western terminus of SH-130
McClain	Newcastle	110.6	178.0	SH-37	Northern terminus
1.000 mi = 1.609 km; 1.000 km = 0.621 mi: Concurrency terminus
