= Payne, Oklahoma =

- Unincorporated community
- Location within Oklahoma Location within the United States
- Coordinates: 34°54′22″N 97°31′48″W
- Country: United States
- State: Oklahoma
- County: McClain
- Elevation: 1,037 ft (316 m)
- Time zone: UTC-6 (Central (CST))
  - Summer (DST): UTC-5 (CDT)
- ZIP Code: 73052 (Lindsay)
- GNIS feature ID: 1100725

Payne is an unincorporated community in McClain County, Oklahoma, United States. It is located on State Highway 59.
