= Tabler, Oklahoma =

- Unincorporated community
- Location within Oklahoma Location within the United States
- Coordinates: 35°02′39″N 97°49′11″W
- Country: United States
- State: Oklahoma
- County: Grady
- Elevation: 1,086 ft (331 m)
- Time zone: UTC-6 (Central (CST))
  - Summer (DST): UTC-5 (CDT)
- GNIS feature ID: 1100871

Tabler is an unincorporated community in eastern Grady County, Oklahoma. It is located at the western end of State Highway 39, where it meets U.S. Highway 62/277/SH-9.

== Notable citizens ==
- Shug Fisher - Actor, comedian, singer, songwriter, and musician
