= Dibble, Oklahoma =

- Town
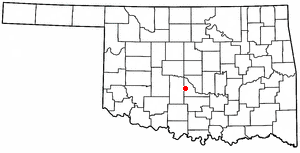
- Location in Oklahoma
- Coordinates: 35°00′56″N 97°37′39″W
- Country: United States
- State: Oklahoma
- County: McClain

Area
  - Total: 7.61 sq mi (19.70 km^{2})
  - Land: 7.47 sq mi (19.34 km^{2})
  - Water: 0.14 sq mi (0.37 km^{2})
- Elevation: 1,188 ft (362 m)

Population (2020)
  - Total: 867
  - Density: 116.1/sq mi (44.84/km^{2})
- Time zone: UTC-6 (Central (CST))
  - Summer (DST): UTC-5 (CDT)
- ZIP Codes: 73031 (Dibble); 73010 (Blanchard)
- Area code: 405
- FIPS code: 40-20650
- GNIS feature ID: 2412428

Dibble is a town in McClain County, Oklahoma, United States. The population of the town was 867 at the 2020 census. Dibble is in the Oklahoma City Metropolitan Area, according to the U.S. Census, within the outer suburban area west of Purcell and southwest of Norman.

== History ==
Located in western McClain County, for much of the nineteenth century the site of the present community existed in the Chickasaw Nation's Pontotoc County. According to historian George Shirk, John and James Dibble operated a ranch in the area and contributed their name to the town and to the creek that flows through it. The ranch lay on the Fort Smith to Fort Sill military road and served as a stopping point for soldiers and travelers. The village may have been in existence as early as 1869, and the Post Office Department designated a Dibble post office in 1894 with Horatio Orem as postmaster.

In 1901 the Gazetteer and Business Directory of Indian Territory reported that Dibble had one hundred residents, a hotel, a grocery store, a general store, a blacksmith, a doctor, and three stockmen. Ranching served as the early economic staple, soon followed by farming. In 1902 J. T. Payne platted the townsite, which the Department of Interior approved in November of that year, withholding the land from the Chickasaw allotment process. In 1906, after the Oklahoma Central Railway failed to build through the town, placing its tracks 8 miles (13 km) north at Blanchard, the town lost many of its burgeoning businesses. The town's school system was first established in 1907. In 1911 Polk's Oklahoma Gazetteer estimated the population of Dibble at 150 and listed two general stores, a confectioner, a blacksmith, a doctor, and a drugstore. In 1918 the population dropped to 125, but the town had added a gristmill, a cotton gin, and a feed store, reflecting the emphasis on farming.

In 1926 the post office discontinued. In 1936 the Works Progress Administration built an addition to the school, which educated children from the surrounding region. In 1937 State Highway 39 was completed adjacent to the community, allowing the school district to annex outlying rural schools. Also in 1937 the town incorporated, and in 1940 the population stood at 97. The school, area petroleum drilling, and agriculture supported Dibble for much of the twentieth century. In 1953 another post office began operation. The 1960 population was 127, climbing to 184 in 1970. In 1990 the town had 181 residents, which rose to 289 in 2000. That year there were 568 students enrolled in the Dibble School District. By 2010 the town had bloomed to 878 residents.

== Geography ==
Dibble is in western McClain County, 17 miles (27 km) west of Purcell, the county seat, the same distance east of Chickasha, and 35 miles (56 km) south of Oklahoma City. The town is located along State Highway 39 just east of the State Highway 76 junction.

According to the U.S. Census Bureau, the town of Dibble has a total area of 7.6 square miles (19.7 km^{2}), of which 0.14 square miles (0.36 km^{2}), or 1.85%, are water. Dibble Creek drains the center and northern parts of town, flowing east to join Walnut Creek near Washington. Walnut Creek is a tributary of the Canadian River, part of the Arkansas River watershed. The southern portion of Dibble is drained by Criner Creek, which flows southeast to the Washita River near Maysville. The Washita is part of the Red River watershed.

== Demographics ==
Historical population
Census	Pop.	Note	%±
1940	97		—
1950	148		52.6%
1960	127		−14.2%
1970	184		44.9%
1980	348		89.1%
1990	181		−48.0%
2000	289		59.7%
2010	878		203.8%
2020	867		−1.3%
U.S. Decennial Census

=== 2020 census ===
As of the 2020 census, Dibble had a population of 867. The median age was 40.6 years. 26.1% of residents were under the age of 18 and 15.3% of residents were 65 years of age or older. For every 100 females there were 94.8 males, and for every 100 females age 18 and over there were 97.8 males age 18 and over.

0.0% of residents lived in urban areas, while 100.0% lived in rural areas.

There were 313 households in Dibble, of which 32.9% had children under the age of 18 living in them. Of all households, 55.9% were married-couple households, 16.0% were households with a male householder and no spouse or partner present, and 19.8% were households with a female householder and no spouse or partner present. About 20.1% of all households were made up of individuals and 8.6% had someone living alone who was 65 years of age or older.

There were 342 housing units, of which 8.5% were vacant. The homeowner vacancy rate was 2.8% and the rental vacancy rate was 11.1%.

Racial composition as of the 2020 census
Race	Number	Percent
White	691	79.7%
Black or African American	3	0.3%
American Indian and Alaska Native	72	8.3%
Asian	2	0.2%
Native Hawaiian and Other Pacific Islander	1	0.1%
Some other race	22	2.5%
Two or more races	76	8.8%
Hispanic or Latino (of any race)	60	6.9%

=== 2000 census ===
As of the census of 2000, there were 289 people, 111 households, and 84 families residing in the town. The population density was 108.7 inhabitants per square mile (42.0/km^{2}). There were 120 housing units at an average density of 45.1 per square mile (17.4/km^{2}). The racial makeup of the town was 88.93% White, 5.88% Native American, and 5.19% from two or more races. Hispanic or Latino of any race were 1.38% of the population.

There were 111 households, out of which 36.0% had children under the age of 18 living with them, 58.6% were married couples living together, 11.7% had a female householder with no husband present, and 24.3% were non-families. 20.7% of all households were made up of individuals, and 4.5% had someone living alone who was 65 years of age or older. The average household size was 2.60 and the average family size was 3.00.

In the town, the population was spread out, with 28.0% under the age of 18, 8.0% from 18 to 24, 29.1% from 25 to 44, 26.0% from 45 to 64, and 9.0% who were 65 years of age or older. The median age was 36 years. For every 100 females, there were 87.7 males. For every 100 females age 18 and over, there were 100.0 males.

The median income for a household in the town was $30,781, and the median income for a family was $35,000. Males had a median income of $30,000 versus $14,286 for females. The per capita income for the town was $16,609. About 10.6% of families and 10.1% of the population were below the poverty line, including 9.6% of those under the age of eighteen and 7.0% of those 65 or over.
