= Ratliff City, Oklahoma =

Town in Carter County, Oklahoma, United States

- Town
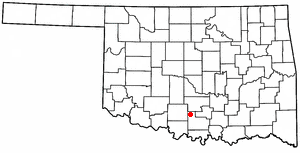
- Location of Ratliff City, Oklahoma
- Coordinates: 34°26′57″N 97°30′56″W
- Country: United States
- State: Oklahoma
- County: Carter

Area
  - Total: 1.13 sq mi (2.92 km^{2})
  - Land: 1.12 sq mi (2.91 km^{2})
  - Water: 0.0039 sq mi (0.01 km^{2})
- Elevation: 1,070 ft (330 m)

Population (2020)
  - Total: 64
  - Density: 57.0/sq mi (22.02/km^{2})
- Time zone: UTC-6 (Central (CST))
  - Summer (DST): UTC-5 (CDT)
- ZIP code: 73481
- Area code: 580
- FIPS code: 40-61900
- GNIS feature ID: 2412530

Ratliff City is a town in Carter County, Oklahoma, United States. As of the 2020 census, Ratliff City had a population of 64. Ratliff City was named for Ollie Ratliff, owner of a local garage. It is part of the Ardmore, Oklahoma Micropolitan Statistical Area.

== History ==
The post office was opened on January 1, 1953, when the town was incorporated.

== Geography ==
Ratliff City is located in northwestern Carter County at the junction of State Highways 7 and 76. Highway 7 leads east 24 miles (39 km) to Davis and west 27 miles (43 km) to Duncan, while Highway 76 leads north 12 miles (19 km) to Foster and south 15 miles (24 km) to Healdton.

According to the United States Census Bureau, Ratliff City has a total area of 1.1 square miles (2.9 km^{2}), all land.

== Demographics ==
Historical population
Census	Pop.	Note	%±
1970	250		—
1980	350		40.0%
1990	157		−55.1%
2000	131		−16.6%
2010	120		−8.4%
2020	64		−46.7%
U.S. Decennial Census

=== 2020 census ===
As of the 2020 census, Ratliff City had a population of 64. The median age was 50.0 years. 14.1% of residents were under the age of 18 and 34.4% of residents were 65 years of age or older. For every 100 females there were 178.3 males, and for every 100 females age 18 and over there were 175.0 males age 18 and over.

0.0% of residents lived in urban areas, while 100.0% lived in rural areas.

There were 36 households in Ratliff City, of which 44.4% had children under the age of 18 living in them. Of all households, 38.9% were married-couple households, 30.6% were households with a male householder and no spouse or partner present, and 22.2% were households with a female householder and no spouse or partner present. About 13.9% of all households were made up of individuals and 8.4% had someone living alone who was 65 years of age or older.

There were 39 housing units, of which 7.7% were vacant. The homeowner vacancy rate was 3.8% and the rental vacancy rate was 0.0%.

Racial composition as of the 2020 census
Race	Number	Percent
White	48	75.0%
Black or African American	7	10.9%
American Indian and Alaska Native	0	0.0%
Asian	0	0.0%
Native Hawaiian and Other Pacific Islander	0	0.0%
Some other race	1	1.6%
Two or more races	8	12.5%
Hispanic or Latino (of any race)	1	1.6%

=== 2000 census ===
The median income for a household in the town was $23,125, and the median income for a family was $27,917. Males had a median income of $37,083 versus $11,250 for females. The per capita income for the town was $11,080. There were 20.0% of families and 17.5% of the population living below the poverty line, including 27.6% of under eighteens and 25.0% of those over 64.
