= Newcastle, Oklahoma =

- City
- Interactive map of Newcastle, Oklahoma
- Location within Oklahoma Location within the United States
- Coordinates: 35.242395°N 97.595336°W
- Country: United States
- State: Oklahoma
- County: McClain
- Founded: March 26, 1894
- Incorporated as South Newcastle: January 18, 1962
- Incorporated as Newcastle: 1965

Government
  - Type: Council–manager
  - Mayor: Karl Nail
  - Vice-Mayor: Gene Reid
  - City manager: Kevin Self
  - Councilmembers: Mike Fullerton; Marci White; Todd D’Amico

Area
  - Total: 61.180 sq mi (158.455 km^{2})
  - Land: 60.058 sq mi (155.550 km^{2})
  - Water: 1.153 sq mi (2.985 km^{2}) 1.88%
- Elevation: 1,210 ft (370 m)

Population (2020)
  - Total: 10,984
  - Estimate (2024): 14,677
  - Density: 182.89/sq mi (70.614/km^{2})
- Time zone: UTC−6 (Central (CST))
  - Summer (DST): UTC−5 (CDT)
- ZIP Code: 73065
- Area code(s): 405 and 572
- FIPS code: 40-51150
- GNIS feature ID: 2411241
- Website: newcastleok.gov

Newcastle is a city in McClain County, Oklahoma, United States, and part of the Oklahoma City metropolitan area. The population was 10,984 at the 2020 census, and was estimated at 14,677 in 2024.

== History ==
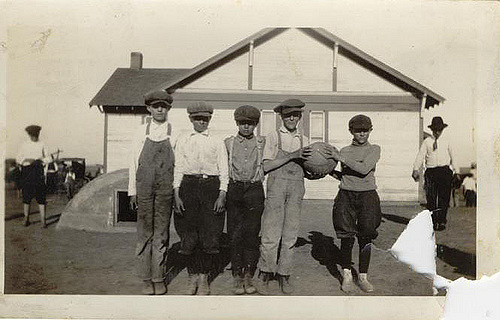
Children on playground at Pleasant Hill School in 1914. Newcastle, Oklahoma

Newcastle became a dot on the map with the opening of a new post office March 26, 1894 and a population of 25. The area had previously been served by the nearby William P. Leeper Post Office, opened in 1888, but closed in 1892 after Leeper was shot in a range fencing dispute. The mail office was established on the Minco-to-Norman road in Section 11, Township 9 North, Range 4 West. Eulalie V. Kelley was the first postmaster. In 1905, postmaster Alonzo Haun moved the facility to his general store in Section 14, Township 9 North, Range 4 West.

Newcastle lay in the Chickasaw Nation. The community's first residents included Choctaw, Chickasaw, and individuals who had married into those tribes. Many were involved in ranching. By 1907, the community had a subscription school, a cotton gin, two stores, and two blacksmiths.

Changes spurred Newcastle's growth throughout the 1920s. In 1920 the town's post office was relocated one mile east on land donated for a public school and a church. In 1922, work started on a South Canadian River bridge. The steel thru-truss bridge with timber flooring was Oklahoma's first federal aid project and a part of the Ozark Trail that was to link Oklahoma City to Amarillo, Texas. Although the trail was never fully completed, the bridge stayed. It opened on April 23, 1923, and cost $321,393.38 to build. The bridge attracted businesses and allowed for the construction of Highway 62 through Newcastle in 1927.

Until the mid-twenties, there was a major river ford at May Avenue that was used whenever the water wasn't too deep. Farmers from Newcastle forged the river with their horses and wagons and traveled up May Avenue on their way to the Oklahoma City Farmer's Market by Western and Reno. Today, only a single section of the old Newcastle Bridge remains alongside the Interstate 44 bridge after having received significant damage during the 2013 tornado (see below).

During World War II, Newcastle's population stood at approximately 100. During the war five local men gave their lives in defense of their country. Another was captured in the Philippines and spent more than three years as a Japanese prisoner. Soon after Japan surrendered, a tornado swept through Newcastle and destroyed the school and much of the business section. The twister touched down the evening of September 25, 1945, moving from the southwest to the northeast.

The limits of Newcastle essentially comprised the post office and school district until around 1960, when Oklahoma City began annexing huge chunks of land across the river. Incorporated January 18, 1962 as South Newcastle, it expanded its area to some 16,000 acres. Nearby Tuttle and Blanchard expanded as well to attempt to prevent Oklahoma City from trying to annex across the Canadian River. A petition to change the name to Newcastle followed in 1965.

Census records indicate a population of 1,271 in 1970, but by the mid-1970s, Oklahoma City had expanded past SW 74th Street, populating near the Interstate 44 corridor, which spurred growth in Newcastle. The population hit 3,076 in 1980 and 5,434 by 2000. In the 1980s, Newcastle annexed territory that lies near Norman, Oklahoma (north of State Highway 9).

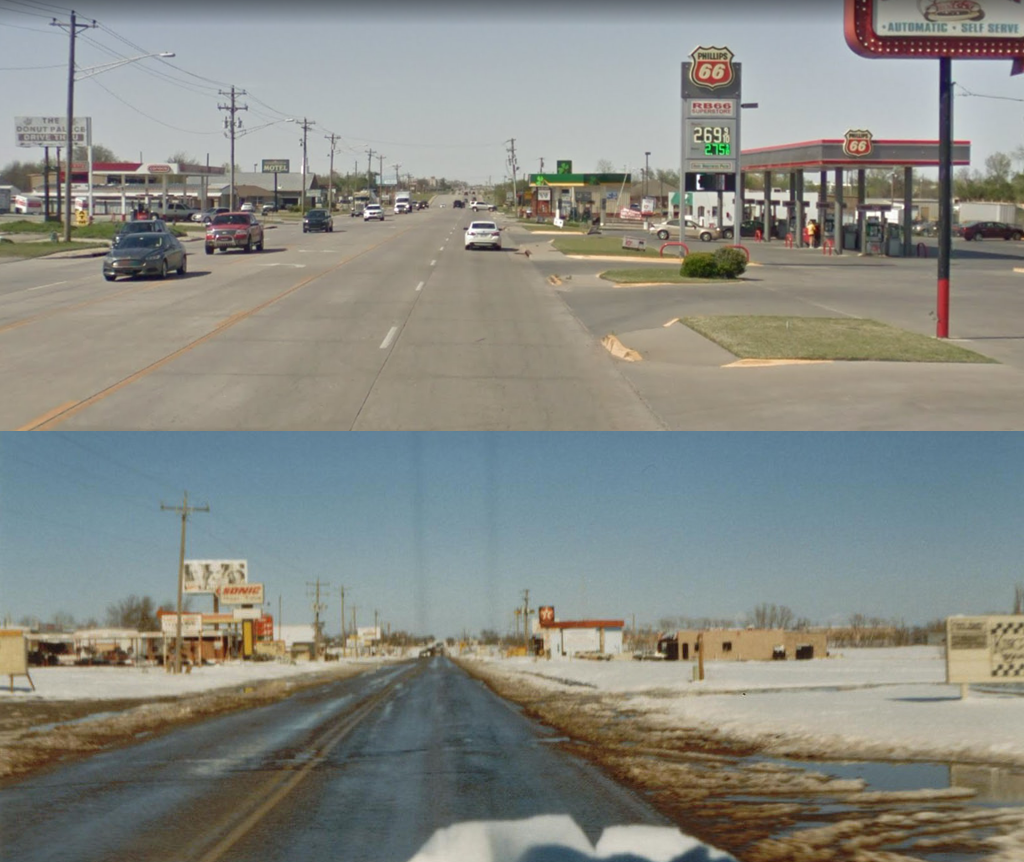
Photo of Newcastle, Oklahoma before and after expansion of Main Street / Highway 62 to 4 lanes

Cotton, ranching, and the dairy industry, once important to the local economy, declined with subdivisions and commercial development taking over former agricultural lands. At the end of the twentieth century the public school system was Newcastle's largest employer. The 2010 census recorded 7,685 residents and the population is estimated to be over 10,000 by 2020.

In January 2019, Newcastle was ranked 36th "Best City to Live" in the United States by 24/7 Wall St., which created a weighted index of over two dozen measures to identify the best city to live in each state.

=== Tornadoes ===
April 25, 1893, a massive tornado, reportedly over a mile and a quarter wide at one point, moved northeast along a 15-mile path from northwest of Newcastle through what now is part of Moore, and swept away at least 30 homes. Thirty-three people were killed with 11 people dying in one home, 6 in a second home and 4 in a third home. This tornado was one of at least 5 strong/violent tornadoes in central Oklahoma on this day, but the only one within the immediate Oklahoma City area. The local Norman paper reported that residents of Cleveland County were "scared... as they never have been scared before." In addition, there was a "general scampering from all parts and a hunt for caves was generally inaugurated."

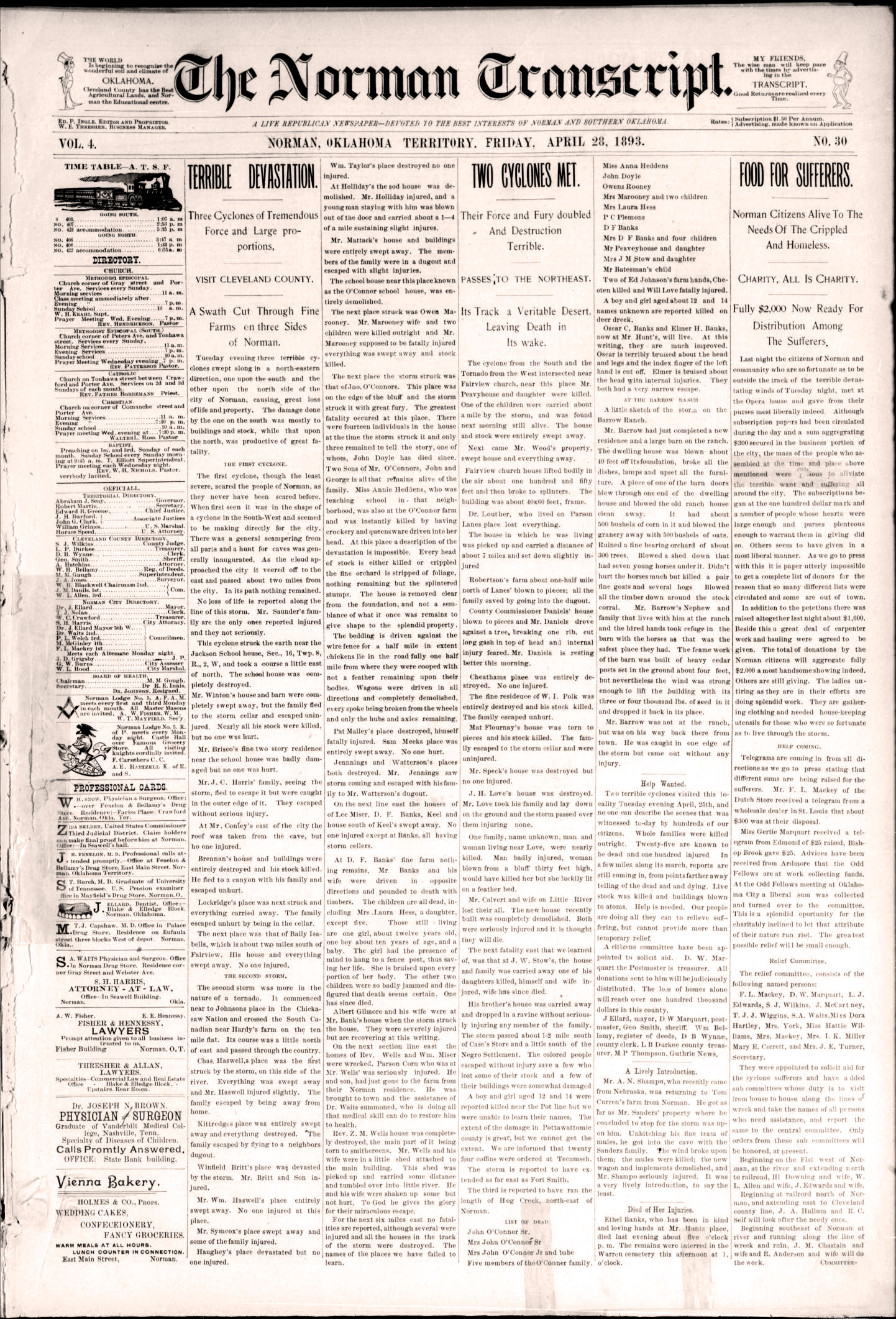
Norman Transcript newspaper describing destruction from tornadoes in Oklahoma Territory on Tuesday, April 25, 1893

On May 3, 1999, the F5 1999 Bridge Creek–Moore tornado struck parts of Newcastle and resulted in the destruction of several homes in the Newcastle city limits. Greater destruction occurred in Bridge Creek and Moore. This violent, long-lived tornado was the most infamous of nearly 60 tornadoes that struck central Oklahoma during an unprecedented outbreak.

On May 24, 2011, a tornado ripped through parts of Newcastle. There were an estimated 160 homes either damaged or destroyed and over 20 businesses damaged. However, there was no loss of life within the city.

On May 20, 2013, another violent tornado damaged parts of Newcastle, including the historic retired Ozark Trail Bridge, growing rapidly as it headed north crossing the Canadian River, and did a large amount of damage to neighboring Moore and southern Oklahoma City.

== Geography ==
Newcastle is in the northwestern corner of McClain County, bordered to the north by Oklahoma City in Cleveland County and to the west by Tuttle in Grady County. It is bordered to the south by Blanchard and Cole, to the southeast by Goldsby, and to the east by Norman, also in Cleveland County. The rapidly growing area of northern McClain and Grady counties around Newcastle is known as the "Tri-City Area" with Tuttle and Blanchard. Newcastle is the largest incorporated community in McClain County.

According to the United States Census Bureau, the city has a total area of 61.180 square miles (158.46 km^{2}), of which 60.058 square miles (155.55 km^{2}) is land and 1.152 square miles (2.98 km^{2}) (1.88%) is water. The Canadian River forms the northeastern boundary of the city and the border with Cleveland County.

=== Climate ===
Climate data for Newcastle, OK (1991–2020 precipitation normals)Elevation: 1,321 feet (403 metres). Lat: 35.2981° N Lon: 97.6314° W
Month	Jan	Feb	Mar	Apr	May	Jun	Jul	Aug	Sep	Oct	Nov	Dec	Year
Average precipitation inches	1.33	1.56	2.62	3.61	5.00	4.84	3.70	3.70	3.60	3.23	1.74	1.99	36.92
Average precipitation mm	34	40	67	92	127	123	94	94	91	82	44	51	939
Source: NOAA

== Demographics ==
Historical population
Census	Pop.	Note	%±
1970	1,271		—
1980	3,076		142.0%
1990	4,214		37.0%
2000	5,434		29.0%
2010	7,685		41.4%
2020	10,984		42.9%
2024 (est.)	14,677		33.6%
U.S. Decennial Census; 2020 Census

Newcastle, Oklahoma – racial and ethnic composition Note: the US Census treats Hispanic/Latino as an ethnic category. This table excludes Latinos from the racial categories and assigns them to a separate category. Hispanics/Latinos may be of any race.
Race / ethnicity (NH = non-Hispanic)	Pop. 1990	Pop. 2000	Pop. 2010	Pop. 2020	% 1990	% 2000	% 2010	% 2020
White alone (NH)	3,879	4,813	6,426	8,242	92.05%	88.57%	83.62%	75.04%
Black or African American alone (NH)	4	10	45	118	0.09%	0.18%	0.59%	1.07%
Native American or Alaska Native alone (NH)	241	277	481	644	5.72%	5.10%	6.26%	5.86%
Asian alone (NH)	5	19	51	84	0.12%	0.35%	0.66%	0.76%
Pacific Islander alone (NH)	—	1	2	4	—	0.02%	0.03%	0.04%
Other race alone (NH)	0	1	1	24	0.00%	0.02%	0.01%	0.22%
Mixed race or multiracial (NH)	—	178	378	1,137	—	3.28%	4.92%	10.35%
Hispanic or Latino (any race)	85	135	301	731	2.02%	2.48%	3.92%	6.66%
Total	4,214	5,434	7,685	10,984	100.00%	100.00%	100.00%	100.00%

=== 2020 census ===
As of the 2020 census, there were 10,984 people, 4,049 households, and 3,134 families residing in the city. The population density was 182.89 inhabitants per square mile (70.6/km^{2}). There were 4,250 housing units at an average density of 70.77 per square mile (27.3/km^{2}). The racial makeup of the city was 76.89% White, 1.10% African American, 6.41% Native American, 0.76% Asian, 0.04% Pacific Islander, 1.84% from some other races and 12.96% from two or more races. Hispanic or Latino people of any race were 6.66% of the population.

A median age of 38.9 years, with 26.3% of residents under the age of 18 and 15.3% of residents 65 years of age or older. For every 100 females there were 98.2 males, and for every 100 females age 18 and over there were 96.9 males age 18 and over.

0% of residents lived in urban areas, while 100.0% lived in rural areas.

There were 4,049 households in Newcastle, of which 38.6% had children under the age of 18 living in them. Of all households, 62.2% were married-couple households, 13.7% were households with a male householder and no spouse or partner present, and 18.8% were households with a female householder and no spouse or partner present. About 18.7% of all households were made up of individuals and 8.7% had someone living alone who was 65 years of age or older.

There were 4,250 housing units, of which 4.7% were vacant. Among occupied housing units, 81.0% were owner-occupied and 19.0% were renter-occupied. The homeowner vacancy rate was 2.3% and the rental vacancy rate was 7.6%.

=== 2010 census ===
As of the 2010 census, there were 7,685 people, 2,839 households, and 2,271 families residing in the city. The population density was 128.40 inhabitants per square mile (49.6/km^{2}). There were 2,976 housing units at an average density of 49.72 per square mile (19.2/km^{2}). The racial makeup of the city was 85.83% White, 0.64% African American, 6.38% Native American, 0.66% Asian, 0.03% Pacific Islander, 1.18% from some other races and 5.28% from two or more races. Hispanic or Latino people of any race were 3.92% of the population.

There were 2,839 households, out of which 20.6% had children under the age of 18 living with them, 72.5% were married couples living together, 7.7% had a female householder with no husband present, and 16.5% were non-families. 14.2% of all households were made up of individuals, and 5.5% had someone living alone who was 65 years of age or older. The average household size was 2.75 and the average family size was 3.02.

In the city, the population was spread out, with 20.6% under the age of 18, 7.56% from 18 to 24, 29.58% from 25 to 44, 28.24% from 45 to 64, and 8.39% who were 65 years of age or older. The median age was 38 years. Females represented 49.84% of the population with a median age of 43 and males represented 50.16% of the population with a median age of 39 years.

The median income for a household in the city was $74,167, and the median income for a family was $77,064. Males had a median income of $55,875 versus $37,889 for females. The per capita income for the city was $29,538. About 6.2% of families and 7.2% of the population were below the poverty line, including 4.6% of those under age 18 and 2.9% of those age 65 or over.

== Education ==
Most of Newcastle is in the Newcastle Public Schools school district. Pieces are in the Blanchard Public Schools school district and in the Norman Public Schools school district.

The Newcastle School District consists of four school buildings, as well as the Newcastle Early Childhood Center (ECC) (Grades PreK-1), Newcastle Elementary School (Grades 2-5), Newcastle Middle School (Grades 6-8), and Newcastle High School (Grades 9-12). Schools are located along and just off Main Street/US Highway 62. School colors include a royal blue and black, with the mascot being a "Newcastle Racer". Students attend classes four days a week (Monday-Thursday).

=== Library ===
The Newcastle Public Library is part of the Pioneer Library System, which serves communities throughout south-central Oklahoma.

== Parks and Recreation ==
Newcastle maintains several public parks offering recreational amenities for residents and visitors:

- Veterans Park – the largest park in Newcastle at approximately 90 acres. It includes soccer fields, baseball and softball diamonds, volleyball and basketball courts, multiple playgrounds, a splash pad, and paved walking trails.
- Leesa Cornett Park – a 2-acre neighborhood park that features a playground, picnic tables, pavilion, restrooms, and a volleyball court.
- Lions Park – a 5-acre park with a children's playground, tennis court, covered picnic areas, and open green space.
- Puckett Park – a 2-acre passive-use park that includes shaded seating areas, open lawn, and a decorative fountain.

Parks are maintained by the Newcastle Parks, Beautification, and Recreation Committee, a city-appointed body that meets monthly to plan, develop, and oversee community recreation and beautification efforts.
