= Lindsay, Oklahoma =

City in Oklahoma, US

- City
- Motto: "Working hard as a community"
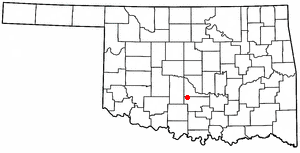
- Location of Lindsay, Oklahoma
- Coordinates: 34°50′21″N 97°36′37″W
- Country: United States
- State: Oklahoma
- County: Garvin

Area
  - Total: 2.32 sq mi (6.01 km^{2})
  - Land: 2.32 sq mi (6.00 km^{2})
  - Water: 0.0077 sq mi (0.02 km^{2})
- Elevation: 974 ft (297 m)

Population (2020)
  - Total: 2,864
  - Density: 1,236.6/sq mi (477.46/km^{2})
- Time zone: UTC-6 (Central (CST))
  - Summer (DST): UTC-5 (CDT)
- ZIP code: 73052
- Area code: 405
- FIPS code: 40-43150
- GNIS feature ID: 2410840
- Website: www.cityoflindsay.com

Lindsay is a city in Garvin County, Oklahoma, United States. As of the 2020 census, Lindsay had a population of 2,864. It once promoted itself as "The Broomcorn Capital of the World" but no longer uses that slogan, as broomcorn is no longer raised in the area.

== History ==
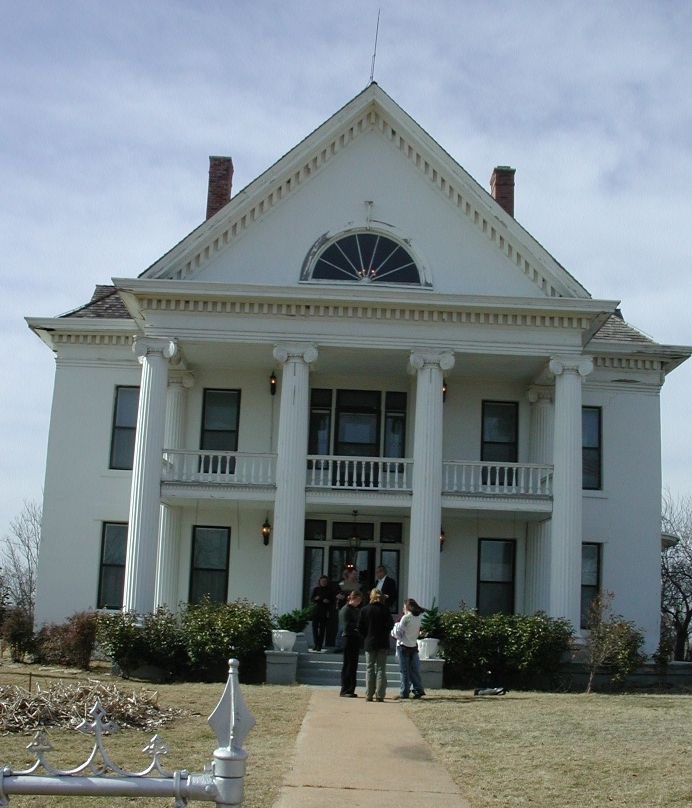
The Lindsay-Murray Mansion

Lindsay was founded in January 1902, when the Kiowa, Chickasha and Fort Smith Railway (an affiliate of the Atchison, Topeka and Santa Fe) and the Chicago, Rock Island and Pacific railroad companies were linking their lines halfway between Chickasha and Pauls Valley, a project completed in 1903. The AT&SF trains from Pauls Valley turned around at Lindsay, and the Rock Island trains from Chickasha did the same.

Lindsay was named after Lewis Lindsay, a local area farmer who donated 440 acres (180 ha) of land for the townsite. At the time of its founding, Lindsay was located in Pickens County, Chickasaw Nation.

== Geography ==
Lindsay is located in northwestern Garvin County. The town's northern border follows the McClain County line.

Lindsay is in the Washita River valley. Oklahoma State Highway 19 passes through the center of town as Cherokee Street, leading east (downriver) 11 miles (18 km) to Maysville and northwest (generally upstream) 28 miles (45 km) to Chickasha. Oklahoma State Highway 76 leads north from Lindsay 23 miles (37 km) to Blanchard and south 46 miles (74 km) Healdton.

According to the United States Census Bureau, Lindsay has a total area of 2.3 square miles (6.0 km^{2}), of which 0.01 square miles (0.02 km^{2}), or 0.25%, is water.

=== Climate ===
Climate data for Lindsay, Oklahoma
Month	Jan	Feb	Mar	Apr	May	Jun	Jul	Aug	Sep	Oct	Nov	Dec	Year
Mean daily maximum °F (°C)	51.0 (10.6)	56.6 (13.7)	66.4 (19.1)	75.8 (24.3)	82.4 (28.0)	89.4 (31.9)	95.6 (35.3)	95.1 (35.1)	86.4 (30.2)	76.8 (24.9)	63.9 (17.7)	53.6 (12.0)	74.4 (23.6)
Mean daily minimum °F (°C)	25.3 (−3.7)	30.0 (−1.1)	39.0 (3.9)	49.1 (9.5)	57.6 (14.2)	65.5 (18.6)	69.8 (21.0)	68.1 (20.1)	60.9 (16.1)	49.9 (9.9)	38.6 (3.7)	28.8 (−1.8)	48.6 (9.2)
Average precipitation inches (mm)	1.3 (33)	1.8 (46)	2.9 (74)	3.4 (86)	5.4 (140)	4.0 (100)	2.1 (53)	2.4 (61)	4.3 (110)	3.7 (94)	2.2 (56)	1.7 (43)	35.1 (890)
Source 1: weather.com
Source 2: Weatherbase.com

== Demographics ==
Historical population
Census	Pop.	Note	%±
1910	1,156		—
1920	1,543		33.5%
1930	1,713		11.0%
1940	1,792		4.6%
1950	3,021		68.6%
1960	4,258		40.9%
1970	3,705		−13.0%
1980	3,454		−6.8%
1990	2,947		−14.7%
2000	2,889		−2.0%
2010	2,840		−1.7%
2020	2,864		0.8%
U.S. Decennial Census

=== 2020 census ===
As of the 2020 census, Lindsay had a population of 2,864. The median age was 37.6 years. 26.5% of residents were under the age of 18 and 18.4% of residents were 65 years of age or older. For every 100 females there were 91.4 males, and for every 100 females age 18 and over there were 89.0 males age 18 and over.

0% of residents lived in urban areas, while 100.0% lived in rural areas.

There were 1,141 households in Lindsay, of which 32.9% had children under the age of 18 living in them. Of all households, 40.3% were married-couple households, 20.4% were households with a male householder and no spouse or partner present, and 32.5% were households with a female householder and no spouse or partner present. About 31.5% of all households were made up of individuals and 17.4% had someone living alone who was 65 years of age or older.

There were 1,347 housing units, of which 15.3% were vacant. Among occupied housing units, 63.4% were owner-occupied and 36.6% were renter-occupied. The homeowner vacancy rate was 2.5% and the rental vacancy rate was 17.4%.

Racial composition as of the 2020 census
Race	Percent
White	76.8%
Black or African American	0.5%
American Indian and Alaska Native	8.3%
Asian	0.7%
Native Hawaiian and Other Pacific Islander	0%
Some other race	3.3%
Two or more races	10.5%
Hispanic or Latino (of any race)	9.4%

=== 2000 census ===
As of the 2000 census, there were 2,889 people, 1,244 households, and 794 families residing in the city. The population density was 1,231.9 inhabitants per square mile (475.6/km^{2}). There were 1,446 housing units at an average density of 616.6 per square mile (238.1/km^{2}). The racial makeup of the city was 90.86% White, 0.14% African American, 4.92% Native American, 0.10% Asian, 0.03% Pacific Islander, 0.76% from other races, and 3.18% from two or more races. Hispanic or Latino of any race were 1.25% of the population.

There were 1,244 households, out of which 27.3% had children under the age of 18 living with them, 52.1% were married couples living together, 9.4% had a female householder with no husband present, and 36.1% were non-families. 34.5% of all households were made up of individuals, and 21.7% had someone living alone who was 65 years of age or older. The average household size was 2.28 and the average family size was 2.91.

In the city, the population was spread out, with 23.3% under the age of 18, 8.5% from 18 to 24, 24.1% from 25 to 44, 19.1% from 45 to 64, and 25.0% who were 65 years of age or older. The median age was 40 years. For every 100 females, there were 81.8 males. For every 100 females age 18 and over, there were 78.1 males.

The median income for a household in the city was $26,667, and the median income for a family was $35,208. Males had a median income of $26,831 versus $18,207 for females. The per capita income for the city was $14,320. About 9.9% of families and 15.6% of the population were below the poverty line, including 19.4% of those under age 18 and 12.5% of those age 65 or over.

== Economy ==
In Lindsay, the oilfield industry is a major source of revenue and jobs.

== Education ==
Lindsay Public Schools provide schooling from kindergarten through high school.

== Transportation ==
Lindsay is at the intersection of Oklahoma State Highway 76 and Oklahoma State Highway 19. The intersection of SH-59B with SH-19 is just east of town, which leads to Oklahoma State Highway 59.

The city is served by Lindsay Municipal Airport northeast of town.

== Parks and attractions ==
The City of Lindsay has three public parks: Charlie Jones Park (on North West 4th Street), George Brown Park (on Highway 76 North, along with the Lindsay Municipal Golf Course), and Glen Curley Park (on 498 W Apache St, along with a swimming pool).

The Murray-Lindsay Mansion & Pikes Peak School features an 1880 home and furnishings, built by Irish immigrant Frank Murray and his wife, Alzira McCaughey, a Choctaw Indian. It contains 15 rooms, two baths, and four fireplaces. Also on-site is a 1908 Pikes Peak two-room school house, across the road from the Mansion. The Mansion is on the National Register of Historic Places listings in Garvin County, Oklahoma as "Erin Springs Mansion."
