= Goldsby, Oklahoma =

- Town
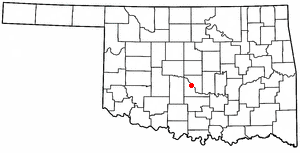
- Location in Oklahoma
- Coordinates: 35°07′51″N 97°28′42″W
- Country: United States
- State: Oklahoma
- County: McClain

Area
  - Total: 26.49 sq mi (68.61 km^{2})
  - Land: 26.23 sq mi (67.93 km^{2})
  - Water: 0.26 sq mi (0.68 km^{2})
- Elevation: 1,161 ft (354 m)

Population (2020)
  - Total: 2,694
  - Density: 102.7/sq mi (39.66/km^{2})
- Time zone: UTC-6 (Central (CST))
  - Summer (DST): UTC-5 (CDT)
- ZIP Codes: 73093 (Goldsby); 73072 (Norman); 73080 (Purcell)
- Area code: 405
- FIPS code: 40-29850
- GNIS feature ID: 2412689
- Website: www.townofgoldsby.com

Goldsby is a town in McClain County, Oklahoma, United States. It is home to the second largest casino in Oklahoma. As of the 2020 census, the population was 2,694, up from 1,801 in 2010.

== Geography ==
Goldsby is in northeastern McClain County, with the Canadian River forming its northeastern boundary and the border with Cleveland County. The town is bordered to the northwest by Newcastle, to the southeast by Purcell, the McClain county seat, and to the northeast by Norman in Cleveland County.

Goldsby is closely tied to its neighbor to the south, Washington. As Goldsby has no post office, mail is processed through the Washington post office (ZIP Code 73093). Goldsby falls within the boundaries of the Washington public school district. However, Goldsby provides Washington with other resources such as fire department and water services.

According to the U.S. Census Bureau, the town of Goldsby has a total area of 26.5 square miles (69 km^{2}), of which 26.2 square miles (68 km^{2}) are land and 0.3 square miles (0.8 km^{2}), or 0.99%, are water.

Riverwind Casino, the second largest casino in Oklahoma, is located in the northern part of Goldsby on State Highway 9. Interstate 35 passes through the northern and eastern parts of town, with access from exits 101, 104, and 106. Oklahoma City is 24 miles (39 km) to the north, and Ardmore is 75 miles (121 km) to the south.

The Town of Goldsby maintains one airport for general aviation usage, David Jay Perry Airport, as well as several private landing fields. Goldsby is also the home of the Albert Engstrom Forest Regeneration Center.

The town includes several small businesses. Goldsby also has a state tag agency, community center, and a veterans' memorial.

== Demographics ==
Historical population
Census	Pop.	Note	%±
1970	298		—
1980	603		102.3%
1990	816		35.3%
2000	1,204		47.5%
2010	1,801		49.6%
2020	2,694		49.6%
U.S. Decennial Census

=== 2020 census ===
As of the 2020 census, Goldsby had a population of 2,694. The median age was 38.4 years. 29.0% of residents were under the age of 18 and 14.5% of residents were 65 years of age or older. For every 100 females there were 98.1 males, and for every 100 females age 18 and over there were 97.9 males age 18 and over.

0.3% of residents lived in urban areas, while 99.7% lived in rural areas.

There were 925 households in Goldsby, of which 42.9% had children under the age of 18 living in them. Of all households, 67.6% were married-couple households, 12.2% were households with a male householder and no spouse or partner present, and 15.1% were households with a female householder and no spouse or partner present. About 15.2% of all households were made up of individuals and 7.4% had someone living alone who was 65 years of age or older.

There were 966 housing units, of which 4.2% were vacant. The homeowner vacancy rate was 1.6% and the rental vacancy rate was 13.1%.

Racial composition as of the 2020 census
Race	Number	Percent
White	1,918	71.2%
Black or African American	14	0.5%
American Indian and Alaska Native	202	7.5%
Asian	18	0.7%
Native Hawaiian and Other Pacific Islander	1	0.0%
Some other race	237	8.8%
Two or more races	304	11.3%
Hispanic or Latino (of any race)	395	14.7%

=== 2000 census ===
As of the 2000 census, 9.8% of the population was between the ages of 18 and 24, 30.1% from 25 to 44, and 24.5% from 45 to 64. The average household size was 2.63 and the average family size was 3.01.

Males had a median income of $33,281 versus $23,750 for females. About 6.7 percent of families and 8 percent of the population were below the poverty line, including 5.1% of those under age 18 and 8.3% of those age 65 or over.

== Education ==
Much of Goldsby is in the Washington Public Schools school district. Portions are in the Norman Public Schools school district. Small pieces extend into the Newcastle Public Schools and the Blanchard Public Schools school districts.
