= Maysville, Oklahoma =

Town in Oklahoma, US

- Town
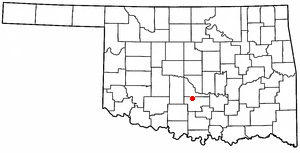
- Location in Oklahoma
- Coordinates: 34°52′12″N 97°22′16″W
- Country: United States
- State: Oklahoma
- Counties: Garvin, McClain

Area
  - Total: 1.91 sq mi (4.95 km^{2})
  - Land: 1.54 sq mi (3.98 km^{2})
  - Water: 0.37 sq mi (0.97 km^{2})
- Elevation: 965 ft (294 m)

Population (2020)
  - Total: 1,087
  - Density: 707.0/sq mi (272.99/km^{2})
- Time zone: UTC-6 (Central (CST))
  - Summer (DST): UTC-5 (CDT)
- ZIP Code: 73057
- Area code: 405
- FIPS code: 40-47150
- GNIS feature ID: 2412966
- Website: townofmaysville.wordpress.com

Maysville is a town in Garvin and McClain counties, Oklahoma, United States. The population was 1,087 at the 2020 census, down from 1,232 in 2010.

== History ==
A post office was established at this location on March 19, 1878, and operated until May 29, 1878. It was reestablished as Beef Creek, Indian Territory, on June 17, 1878. The post office took its name from nearby Beef Creek, a tributary of the Washita River.

On September 19, 1902, after the town had relocated a mile north to be alongside the tracks of the newly-laid Kiowa, Chickasha and Fort Smith Railway (an affiliate of the Atchison, Topeka and Santa Fe Railway), and the post office joined it, the name was changed to Maysville. The new name was in honor of David Mayes and John Mayes, local ranchers.

At the time of its founding, Beef Creek, later Maysville, was located in Pickens County, Chickasaw Nation.

== Geography ==
Maysville is located in northern Garvin County on the south side of the valley of the Washita River. The town has an exclave to the north in McClain County, surrounding Wiley Post Memorial Reservoir.

Oklahoma State Highway 19 passes through the center of town as 6th Street, leading southeast 12 miles (19 km) to Pauls Valley, the Garvin County seat, and west 11 miles (18 km) to Lindsay. State Highway 74 (Ripley Street) crosses Highway 19 on the east side of downtown, leading north 14 miles (23 km) to Purcell and south 13 miles (21 km) to Elmore City.

According to the U.S. Census Bureau, Maysville has a total area of 1.9 square miles (4.9 km^{2}), of which 1.5 square miles (3.9 km^{2}) are land and 0.4 square miles (1.0 km^{2}), or 19.52%, are water. The Washita River, a tributary of the Red River, passes to the north of the town.

== Demographics ==
Historical population
Census	Pop.	Note	%±
1910	476		—
1920	627		31.7%
1930	875		39.6%
1940	880		0.6%
1950	1,294		47.0%
1960	1,530		18.2%
1970	1,380		−9.8%
1980	1,396		1.2%
1990	1,203		−13.8%
2000	1,313		9.1%
2010	1,232		−6.2%
2020	1,087		−11.8%
U.S. Decennial Census

=== 2020 census ===
As of the 2020 census, Maysville had a population of 1,087. The median age was 39.7 years. 24.7% of residents were under the age of 18 and 18.9% of residents were 65 years of age or older. For every 100 females there were 87.4 males, and for every 100 females age 18 and over there were 82.4 males age 18 and over.

0.0% of residents lived in urban areas, while 100.0% lived in rural areas.

There were 450 households in Maysville, of which 34.2% had children under the age of 18 living in them. Of all households, 37.6% were married-couple households, 21.8% were households with a male householder and no spouse or partner present, and 34.4% were households with a female householder and no spouse or partner present. About 31.3% of all households were made up of individuals and 17.3% had someone living alone who was 65 years of age or older.

There were 522 housing units, of which 13.8% were vacant. The homeowner vacancy rate was 0.3% and the rental vacancy rate was 14.7%.

Racial composition as of the 2020 census
Race	Number	Percent
White	857	78.8%
Black or African American	3	0.3%
American Indian and Alaska Native	84	7.7%
Asian	1	0.1%
Native Hawaiian and Other Pacific Islander	2	0.2%
Some other race	26	2.4%
Two or more races	114	10.5%
Hispanic or Latino (of any race)	62	5.7%

=== 2000 census ===
The median income for a household in the town was $25,921, and the median income for a family was $31,369. Males had a median income of $28,194 versus $18,438 for females. The per capita income for the town was $12,449. About 16.9% of families and 21.6% of the population were below the poverty line, including 24.0% of those under age 18 and 16.1% of those age 65 or over.

== Education ==
The vast majority of Maysville is in the Maysville Public Schools school district. A part of the municipality boundary extends into the Wayne Public Schools school district.

== Notable people ==
- Woody Bledsoe (1921-1995), mathematician and computer scientist
- J Mays (born 1954), industrial designer
- Jake McNiece (1919-2013), US Army paratrooper
- Barry Odom (born 1976), football coach
- Wiley Post (1898-1935), aviator
- Charles Ritcheson (1925-2011), historian, diplomat and university administrator
- Clement Vann Rogers (1839-1911), Cherokee politician, father of Will Rogers
- D. C. Stephenson (1891-1966), Ku Klux Klan leader and convicted murderer
