= McClain County, Oklahoma =

County in Oklahoma, United States

- County
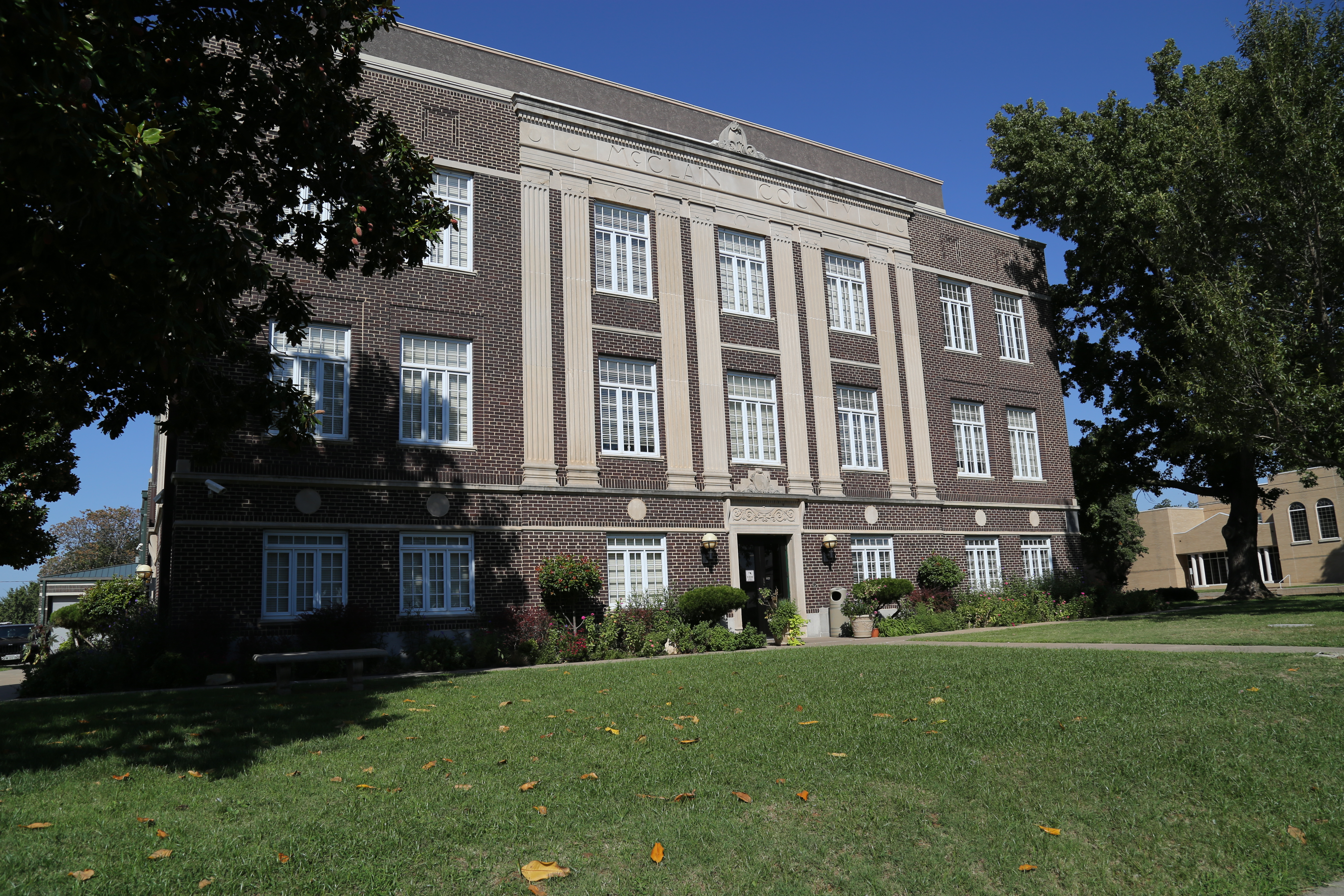
- McClain County Courthouse

- Location within the U.S. state of Oklahoma
- Coordinates: 35°00′N 97°26′W
- Country: United States
- State: Oklahoma
- Founded: 1907
- Seat: Purcell
- Largest city: Newcastle

Area
  - Total: 580 sq mi (1,500 km^{2})
  - Land: 571 sq mi (1,480 km^{2})
  - Water: 9.6 sq mi (25 km^{2}) 1.6%

Population (2020)
  - Total: 41,662
  - Estimate (2025): 49,647 ▲
  - Density: 73.0/sq mi (28.2/km^{2})
- Time zone: UTC−6 (Central)
  - Summer (DST): UTC−5 (CDT)
- Congressional district: 4th
- Website: mcclain-co-ok.us

McClain County is a county located in south central Oklahoma. As of the 2020 census, the population was 41,662. Its county seat is Purcell. The county was named for Charles M. McClain, an Oklahoma constitutional convention attendee.

McClain County is part of the Oklahoma City, OK metropolitan statistical area.

== History ==
The Chickasaw tribe began moving into this area in 1837, when the land had already been assigned to the Choctaws by the U.S. government. In 1855, the area became part of the Chickasaw Nation, after the two tribes officially separated. The present McClain County became part of Pontotoc County, Chickasaw Nation and remained so until Oklahoma attained statehood. Few Chickasaws lived here because of hostilities with western tribes (e.g., Kiowa). Major Richard Mason established Camp Holmes (also called Camp Mason) in 1835, near the present city of Lexington, while negotiating a treaty between the western tribes and the newly arrived Choctaws. Federal troops abandoned the camp in August 1835, after the Treaty of Camp Holmes was signed.

Auguste Pierre Chouteau built a trading post at the Camp Holmes site, but it closed after Chouteau died in 1838. Randolph Marcy is credited with bringing the California Road through this area in 1849. The U.S. Army built Camp Arbuckle in 1850 to protect the road, but the troops were withdrawn to what is now Garvin County, Oklahoma in the following year.

Jesse Chisholm also operated a trading post in this area around 1850. A group of Delaware Indians occupied the former camp, then known as Beaversville, but left before the outbreak of the Civil War.

Montford T. Johnson, a rancher, moved to this area after the Civil War. He and Jesse Chisholm, who acted as the negotiator, obtained an agreement with the Chickasaw leaders to allow ranching on their land, provided no whites were employed. Thereafter, Johnson built a ranch and hired a Chickasaw freedman to operate it. He then established other ranches and hired another freedman to run those.

The Southern Kansas Railway built a line south from Kansas to present McClain County in 1886–7, and the Gulf, Colorado and Santa Fe Railway (both of which were controlled by the Atchison, Topeka and Santa Fe Railway, AT&SF) built a line north from Texas, meeting at and founding the town of Purcell. Eastern Oklahoma Railroad (later acquired by the AT&SF) laid tracks in 1900-04 from Newkirk to Pauls Valley, passing through eastern McClain County. In 1906 the Oklahoma Central Railway (sold to AT&SF in 1914) built a line that traversed McClain County from the southeast to the northwest. It ran through Byars and Purcell, and established Washington, Cole, and Blanchard.

Purcell was a starting point for the Land Run of 1889. It also was at the dividing line between Indian Territory, where alcohol could not be sold, and Oklahoma Territory, where alcohol sale was legal. The town of Lexington, across the river from Purcell, had numerous saloons. In 1899, the Purcell Bridge Company built a toll bridge across the river, profiting from the alcohol trade.

== Geography ==
Map of McClain County

According to the U.S. Census Bureau, the county has a total area of 580 square miles (1,500 km^{2}), of which 571 square miles (1,480 km^{2}) is land and 9.6 square miles (25 km^{2}) (1.6%) is water. The county lies largely in the Red Bed Plains region of the Osage Plains. The western part of the county is hilly and covered with black jack oak trees, while the eastern part is level lowlands. The South Canadian River forms the northern border, The Washita River flows through the southwestern corner, and is fed by several McClain County creeks.

=== Adjacent counties ===
- Cleveland County (north)
- Pottawatomie County (northeast)
- Pontotoc County (east)
- Garvin County (south)
- Grady County (west)

== Demographics ==
Historical population
Census	Pop.	Note	%±
1910	15,659		—
1920	19,326		23.4%
1930	21,575		11.6%
1940	19,205		−11.0%
1950	14,681		−23.6%
1960	12,740		−13.2%
1970	14,157		11.1%
1980	20,291		43.3%
1990	22,795		12.3%
2000	27,740		21.7%
2010	34,506		24.4%
2020	41,662		20.7%
2025 (est.)	49,647	▲	19.2%
U.S. Decennial Census; 1790-1960 1900-1990; 1990-2000 2010-2019

=== 2020 census ===
As of the 2020 census, the county had a population of 41,662. Of the residents, 26.1% were under the age of 18 and 16.1% were 65 years of age or older; the median age was 39.2 years. For every 100 females there were 98.3 males, and for every 100 females age 18 and over there were 96.4 males.

The racial makeup of the county was 75.9% White, 0.8% Black or African American, 6.8% American Indian and Alaska Native, 0.5% Asian, 3.6% from some other race, and 12.3% from two or more races. Hispanic or Latino residents of any race comprised 8.9% of the population.

There were 15,235 households in the county, of which 36.7% had children under the age of 18 living with them and 20.3% had a female householder with no spouse or partner present. About 20.5% of all households were made up of individuals and 9.6% had someone living alone who was 65 years of age or older.

There were 16,421 housing units, of which 7.2% were vacant. Among occupied housing units, 79.8% were owner-occupied and 20.2% were renter-occupied. The homeowner vacancy rate was 1.9% and the rental vacancy rate was 10.8%.

=== 2010 census ===
As of the 2010 United States census, there were 34,506 people, 12,891 households, and 9,785 families residing in the county. The population density was 59.5 people per square mile (23.0 people/km^{2}). There were 13,996 housing units at an average density of 24 units per square mile (9.3/km^{2}). The racial makeup of the county was 84.5% white, 0.7% black or African American, 6.4% Native American, 0.4% Asian, less than 0.1% Pacific Islander, 2.7% from other races, and 5.3% from two or more races. Seven percent of the population were Hispanic or Latino of any race.

There were 12,891 households, out of which 37.4% included children under the age of 18, 61.3% were married couples living together, 9.9% had a female householder with no husband present, 4.7% had a male householder with no wife present, and 24.1% were non-families. Individuals living alone accounted for 20.1% of households and individuals 65 years of age or older living alone accounted for 8.1%. The average household size was 2.66 and the average family size was 3.06.

In the county, the population was spread out, with 26.6% under the age of 18, 6.9% from 18 to 24, 25.7% from 25 to 44, 27.6% from 45 to 64, and 13.2% who were 65 years of age or older. The median age was 38.2 years. For every 100 females, there were 98.5 males. For every 100 females age 18 and over, there were 95.4 males.

The median income for a household in the county was $56,126, and the median income for a family was $67,948. Males had a median income of $42,262 versus $32,821 for females. The per capita income for the county was $24,898. About 8% of families and 12% of the population were below the poverty line, including 11% of those under age 18 and 8% of those age 65 or over.

== Politics ==
Voter Registration and Party Enrollment as of June 30, 2023
Party	Number of Voters	Percentage
Republican	17,631	64.84%
Democratic	5,240	19.27%
Libertarian	229	0.84%
Unaffiliated	4,090	15.04%
Total	27,190	100%

United States presidential election results for McClain County, Oklahoma
Year	Republican		Democratic		Third party(ies)	
Year	No.	%	No.	%	No.	%
1908	780	32.76%	1,234	51.83%	367	15.41%
1912	583	25.63%	1,273	55.96%	419	18.42%
1916	680	25.04%	1,541	56.74%	495	18.23%
1920	1,733	40.32%	2,315	53.86%	250	5.82%
1924	1,233	30.74%	2,519	62.80%	259	6.46%
1928	2,399	55.07%	1,913	43.92%	44	1.01%
1932	818	13.85%	5,087	86.15%	0	0.00%
1936	1,191	22.47%	4,092	77.21%	17	0.32%
1940	1,862	33.01%	3,768	66.80%	11	0.20%
1944	1,492	31.08%	3,301	68.76%	8	0.17%
1948	908	20.83%	3,451	79.17%	0	0.00%
1952	2,326	42.08%	3,201	57.92%	0	0.00%
1956	2,081	41.11%	2,981	58.89%	0	0.00%
1960	2,547	51.85%	2,365	48.15%	0	0.00%
1964	1,638	31.05%	3,638	68.95%	0	0.00%
1968	2,047	36.98%	1,842	33.27%	1,647	29.75%
1972	4,241	73.16%	1,350	23.29%	206	3.55%
1976	2,444	37.19%	4,048	61.59%	80	1.22%
1980	4,284	56.87%	2,990	39.69%	259	3.44%
1984	6,056	69.83%	2,549	29.39%	67	0.77%
1988	4,771	56.44%	3,594	42.52%	88	1.04%
1992	4,377	40.62%	3,378	31.35%	3,021	28.03%
1996	4,363	46.22%	3,753	39.76%	1,323	14.02%
2000	6,750	64.05%	3,679	34.91%	110	1.04%
2004	10,041	72.85%	3,742	27.15%	0	0.00%
2008	11,193	75.92%	3,551	24.08%	0	0.00%
2012	11,112	77.67%	3,194	22.33%	0	0.00%
2016	13,169	78.12%	2,894	17.17%	795	4.72%
2020	15,295	79.51%	3,582	18.62%	359	1.87%
2024	17,005	79.47%	4,031	18.84%	361	1.69%

== Economy ==
The county economy has been based primarily on agriculture and cattle raising. Each town had its own cotton gin early in the 1900s. Purcell had a flour mill. Otherwise, there was little industrial activity. Many county residents commute to work in the Oklahoma City area. Mid-America Area Vo-Tech opened in 1971 to provide vocational education to students. Duke Energy North America built a power plant (which it sold to NRG Energy, Inc., that year) near Newcastle in 2001. The Chickasaw Nation operated a gaming casino at Newcastle.

== Education ==
=== K-12 schools ===
School districts include (all full K-12):

- Alex Public Schools
- Asher Public Schools
- Blanchard Public Schools
- Bridge Creek Public Schools
- Dibble Public Schools
- Lindsay Public Schools
- Maysville Public Schools
- Newcastle Public Schools
- Norman Public Schools
- Paoli Public Schools
- Purcell Public Schools
- Stratford Public Schools
- Washington Public Schools
- Wayne Public Schools

=== Libraries ===
Pioneer Library System operates branch libraries in nine cities in Cleveland, McClain and Pottawatomie counties. The Purcell Public Library at 919 N. 9th Street in Purcell is the only library in McClain County that is part of the Pioneer System.

== Transportation ==
=== Major highways ===
The busiest highway in the county is Interstate 35, which enters the county on the north at Goldsby on the McCall Bridge. It then parallels the Canadian River through the county seat, Purcell. It eventually turns southward and leaves the county at its border with Garvin County.

Another important interstate highway is Interstate 44, which runs through the northwestern part of the county. The H.E. Bailey Turnpike Norman Spur connects this highway to the US-62/US-277/SH-9 intersection.

SH-9 enters McClain County via the McCall bridge, duplexed with I-35, and immediately turns due west, running along the northern edge of Goldsby until its intersection with U.S. Highway 62/U.S. Highway 277, south of Newcastle, Oklahoma. From this intersection the three highways continue southwest towards Blanchard and further on to Chickasha in Grady County.

- Interstate 35
- Interstate 44
- H.E. Bailey Turnpike
  - Norman Spur
- U.S. Highway 62
- U.S. Highway 77
- U.S. Highway 177
- U.S. Highway 277
- State Highway 4
- State Highway 9
- State Highway 24
- State Highway 37
- State Highway 39
- State Highway 59
  - State Highway 59B
- State Highway 74
  - State Highway 74B
- State Highway 76
- State Highway 130
- State Highway 133

=== County roads ===
Like many counties, McClain County contains an extensive network of county-maintained roads. They form a grid with parallel roads generally placed 1 mile apart.

To dispel confusion and assist the small cities introducing new 9-1-1 systems, the county road system was recently renamed and signed throughout the county. East–west roads are numbered, with 100th Street located along the southern edge of the county, and the numbers gradually increasing toward the northern tip of the county. North–south streets are named, generally indicating the name of the road in the Oklahoma City grid that the county road best aligns with. (e.g. Pennsylvania Avenue would, if extended northward, eventually connect with the street of the same name in Oklahoma City.)

== Controversy ==
=== Contaminated water supply ===
In 2010, the EPA ordered local water utilities to begin the first nationwide tests for hexavalent chromium 6 (AKA The Erin Brockovich Chemical). From 2013 to 2015, utilities took more than 60,000 samples of drinking water and found chromium-6 in more than 75 percent of them. The Purcell water supply tested positive for an average of 11.53ppb, 577 times the original recommendation from the scientists at the respected and influential California Office of Environmental Health Hazard Assessment of 0.02ppb.

== Communities ==
=== Cities ===
- Blanchard (also in Grady County)
- Newcastle
- Purcell (county seat; small part in Cleveland County)

=== Towns ===
- Byars
- Cole
- Dibble
- Goldsby
- Maysville (also in Garvin County)
- Rosedale
- Washington
- Wayne

=== Unincorporated communities ===
- Criner
- Payne
- Woody Chapel

== Local landmarks ==
The following sites in McClain County are listed on the National Register of Historic Places:

- Hotel Love, Purcell
- McClain County Courthouse, Purcell
- James C. Nance Memorial Bridge (U.S. Highway 77/State Highway 39 Bridge over the Canadian River), Purcell/Lexington
