= Washington, Oklahoma =

- Town
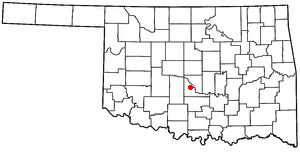
- Location in Oklahoma
- Coordinates: 35°03′29″N 97°29′32″W
- Country: United States
- State: Oklahoma
- County: McClain

Area
  - Total: 1.46 sq mi (3.79 km^{2})
  - Land: 1.45 sq mi (3.75 km^{2})
  - Water: 0.012 sq mi (0.03 km^{2})
- Elevation: 1,125 ft (343 m)

Population (2020)
  - Total: 673
  - Density: 464.4/sq mi (179.29/km^{2})
- Time zone: UTC-6 (Central (CST))
  - Summer (DST): UTC-5 (CDT)
- ZIP Code: 73093
- Area code: 405
- FIPS code: 40-78700
- GNIS feature ID: 2413452
- Website: washingtonok.gov

Washington is a town in McClain County, Oklahoma, United States. The population was 673 as of the 2020 census.

== History ==
While some sources list the town as having been named after George Washington, first president of the United States, the Encyclopedia of Oklahoma History and Culture relates a "popular local story" that the name was actually chosen to honor Caddo chief "Little Boy" George Washington, who had lived nearby.

A post office called Washington has been in operation since 1904. The post office charter was granted May 10, 1904.

When the Oklahoma Central Railway was built through McClain County in 1907, local resident Hoyt Turner and his Chickasaw-Choctaw wife, Daisy Willis, petitioned the federal court at Muskogee to remove the restrictions from a surplus allotment east of their farm so that a townsite could be established. The request was approved on December 24, 1907, shortly after statehood became effective, and Washington became the first townsite to have tribal restrictions removed for that reason.

== Geography ==
Washington is in central McClain County, located along State Highway 24. It is 11 miles (18 km) by road northwest of Purcell, and 31 miles (50 km) south of Oklahoma City.

According to the U.S. Census Bureau, the town has a total area of 1.48 square miles (3.83 km^{2}), of which 0.01 square miles (0.03 km^{2}), or 0.88%, are water. Walnut Creek, a southeast-flowing tributary of the Canadian River, runs along the northern edge of the town.

== Demographics ==
Historical population
| Census | Pop. | Note | %± |
|---|---|---|---|
| 1920 | 336 | | — |
| 1930 | 400 | | 19.0% |
| 1940 | 359 | | −10.2% |
| 1950 | 292 | | −18.7% |
| 1960 | 278 | | −4.8% |
| 1970 | 322 | | 15.8% |
| 1980 | 477 | | 48.1% |
| 1990 | 279 | | −41.5% |
| 2000 | 520 | | 86.4% |
| 2010 | 618 | | 18.8% |
| 2020 | 673 | | 8.9% |
| 2021 (est.) | 685 | ▲ | 1.8% |
U.S. Decennial Census

=== 2020 census ===
As of the 2020 census, Washington had a population of 673. The median age was 34.7 years. 30.9% of residents were under the age of 18 and 12.8% of residents were 65 years of age or older. For every 100 females there were 102.7 males, and for every 100 females age 18 and over there were 91.4 males age 18 and over.

0.0% of residents lived in urban areas, while 100.0% lived in rural areas.

There were 238 households in Washington, of which 45.8% had children under the age of 18 living in them. Of all households, 62.2% were married-couple households, 10.1% were households with a male householder and no spouse or partner present, and 20.2% were households with a female householder and no spouse or partner present. About 13.0% of all households were made up of individuals and 2.9% had someone living alone who was 65 years of age or older.

There were 259 housing units, of which 8.1% were vacant. The homeowner vacancy rate was 3.2% and the rental vacancy rate was 3.1%.

Racial composition as of the 2020 census
| Race | Number | Percent |
|---|---|---|
| White | 537 | 79.8% |
| Black or African American | 2 | 0.3% |
| American Indian and Alaska Native | 42 | 6.2% |
| Asian | 3 | 0.4% |
| Native Hawaiian and Other Pacific Islander | 1 | 0.1% |
| Some other race | 4 | 0.6% |
| Two or more races | 84 | 12.5% |
| Hispanic or Latino (of any race) | 22 | 3.3% |

=== 2000 census ===
As of the census of 2000, there were 520 people, 186 households, and 146 families residing in the town. The population density was 503.8 inhabitants per square mile (194.5/km^{2}). There were 192 housing units at an average density of 186.0 per square mile (71.8/km^{2}). The racial makeup of the town was 92.12% White, 2.88% Native American, 1.15% Pacific Islander, 1.92% from other races, and 1.92% from two or more races. Hispanic or Latino of any race were 4.23% of the population.

There were 186 households, out of which 42.5% had children under the age of 18 living with them, 65.1% were married couples living together, 9.7% had a female householder with no husband present, and 21.0% were non-families. 18.3% of all households were made up of individuals, and 10.8% had someone living alone who was 65 years of age or older. The average household size was 2.80 and the average family size was 3.18.

31.7% of the population was under the age of 18, 6.7% were 18 to 24, 31.9% were 25 to 44, 17.5% from 45 were 64, and 12.1% were 65 years of age or older. The median age was 32 years. For every 100 females, there were 94.8 males. For every 100 females age 18 and over, there were 91.9 males.

The median income for a household in the town was $31,875, and the median income for a family was $36,806. Males had a median income of $31,429 versus $20,089 for females. The per capita income for the town was $14,309. About 13.1% of families and 17.8% of the population were below the poverty line, including 23.0% of those under age 18 and 18.8% of those age 65 or over.

== Education ==
It is within the Washington Public Schools school district.

Washington is the home of Washington Public Schools campus, which comprises a single K-12 school at 101 E. Kirby, Washington, OK 73093. The mascot is the warrior and school colors are red and white. Their rivals are the Purcell Dragons. As of the 2006–07 school year, the graduation rate was 94.7%, there were 17.4 students per teacher, and 916 enrolled students.

Sports played by students include: softball, football, basketball, baseball, cheerleading, golf, powerlifting, and track. Extra-curricular activities include academic team, band, FCCLA, FFA, newspaper, NHS, science club, Spanish club, STUCO, and yearbook.

== Notable residents ==
- Nick Blackburn, former pitcher for the Minnesota Twins, became the baseball coach for Washington High School after retiring from professional baseball in 2015.
- Lometa Odom (1933—2017) basketball player and coach, member of the Women's Basketball Hall of Fame
- Nate Roberts, college football tight end for the Ohio State Buckeyes
- James Winchester, long snapper for the Kansas City Chiefs of the National Football League
