= National Register of Historic Places listings in Cleveland County, Oklahoma =

Location of Cleveland County in Oklahoma

This is a list of the National Register of Historic Places listings in Cleveland County, Oklahoma.

This is intended to be a complete list of the properties and districts on the National Register of Historic Places in Cleveland County, Oklahoma, United States. The locations of National Register properties and districts for which the latitude and longitude coordinates are included below, may be seen in a map.

There are 26 properties and districts listed on the National Register in the county, including 1 National Historic Landmark. Two properties were once listed, but have since been removed.

This National Park Service list is complete through NPS recent listings posted December 19, 2025.

== Current listings ==
	Name on the Register	Image	Date listed	Location	City or town	Description
1	Beta Theta Pi Fraternity House, The University of Oklahoma	Beta Theta Pi Fraternity House, The University of Oklahoma	June 2, 1982 (#82003675)	800 S. Chautauqua Ave. 35°12′26″N 97°27′00″W	Norman	
2	Bizzell Library, University of Oklahoma	Bizzell Library, University of Oklahoma	January 3, 2001 (#01000071)	401 W. Brooks St. 35°12′27″N 97°26′46″W	Norman	
3	Casa Blanca	Casa Blanca	February 21, 1990 (#90000123)	103 W. Boyd; 35°12′40″N 97°26′28″W	Norman	
4	Cleveland County Courthouse	Cleveland County Courthouse	December 28, 2000 (#00001580)	200 S. Peters Ave. 35°13′11″N 97°25′49″W	Norman	
5	Downtown Norman Historic District	Downtown Norman Historic District	October 10, 1978 (#78002226)	105 W. Main and 100-232 E. Main St.; also roughly bounded by Webster, Gray, Porter, Eufaula, James Garner, and Comanche; 35°13′18″N 97°26′29″W	Norman	Second set of boundaries represents a boundary increase of March 12, 2012; originally listed as Norman Historic District
6	Patricio Gimeno House	Patricio Gimeno House	December 30, 1991 (#91001902)	800 Elm St. 35°12′20″N 97°26′52″W	Norman	
7	Oscar B. Jacobson House	Oscar B. Jacobson House	December 23, 1986 (#86003466)	609 S. Chatauqua Ave. 35°12′39″N 97°26′58″W	Norman	
8	H.E. Ledbetter House	H.E. Ledbetter House	June 14, 2001 (#01000655)	701 W. Brooks; 35°12′27″N 97°27′04″W	Norman	
9	Logan Apartments	Logan Apartments	March 11, 2014 (#14000049)	720 W. Boyd St. 35°12′39″N 97°27′04″W	Norman	
10	Mardock Mission		March 14, 1983 (#83002081)	Southeast of Stella off State Highway 9; 35°12′39″N 97°09′31″W	Stella	
11	Moore Public School Building	Moore Public School Building	November 8, 1984 (#84000379)	NW. 1st and Broadway; 35°20′23″N 97°29′12″W	Moore	
12	Moore-Lindsay House	Moore-Lindsay House	November 14, 1985 (#85002788)	508 N. Peters; 35°13′31″N 97°26′39″W	Norman	
13	Norman City Park New Deal Resources	Norman City Park New Deal Resources	December 28, 2000 (#00001572)	Junction of Daws St. and Webster Ave. 35°13′22″N 97°26′14″W	Norman	
14	Norman Public Library	Norman Public Library	December 28, 2000 (#00001581)	329 S. Peters Ave. 35°13′08″N 97°26′23″W	Norman	
15	Oklahoma Center for Continuing Education Historic District	Oklahoma Center for Continuing Education Historic District	June 10, 2011 (#11000334)	Bounded by Asp Ave., Kellogg Dr., Maple and 4th Sts. 35°11′54″N 97°26′44″W	Norman	
16	Park Etude		December 4, 2017 (#100001864)	1028 Connelly Ln. 35°11′49″N 97°27′22″W	Norman	
17	Prairie House		December 4, 2024 (#100011139)	550 48th Avenue NE; 35°13′29″N 97°22′15″W	Norman	
18	President's House, University of Oklahoma	President's House, University of Oklahoma	July 6, 1976 (#76001558)	401 W. Boyd St. 35°12′42″N 97°26′46″W	Norman	
19	Santa Fe Depot	Santa Fe Depot	January 25, 1991 (#90002203)	Junction of Abner Norman Dr. and Comanche St. 35°13′12″N 97°26′33″W	Norman	
20	Sooner Theater Building	Sooner Theater Building	August 31, 1978 (#78002227)	101 E. Main St. 35°13′17″N 97°26′34″W	Norman	
21	Southridge Addition Historic District	Southridge Addition Historic District	August 31, 2018 (#100002882)	Roughly bounded by Classen Boulevard, Oklahoma and S. Ponca Aves., and E. Boyd, Macy, and Okmulgee Sts. 35°12′40″N 97°26′05″W	Norman	
22	Spann House		December 29, 2025 (#100012474)	6810 East Lindsey; 35°12′14″N 97°20′24″W	Norman	
23	US Highway 77 Bridge at Canadian River	US Highway 77 Bridge at Canadian River	September 2, 2003 (#03000882)	U.S. Route 77 over the Canadian River; 35°00′53″N 97°20′52″W	Purcell	Extends into McClain County
24	Union School District 19 1/2	Union School District 19 1/2	December 10, 2014 (#14001026)	SW. corner of 149th St. & S. Luther Rd. 35°19′07″N 97°11′42″W	Newalla	
25	United States Post Office-Norman	United States Post Office-Norman	December 28, 2000 (#00001573)	207 E. Gray St. 35°13′22″N 97°26′32″W	Norman	
26	University of Oklahoma Armory	University of Oklahoma Armory	December 8, 2015 (#15000866)	103 W. Brooks St. 35°12′25″N 97°26′38″W	Norman	

== Former listings ==
	Name on the Register	Image	Date listed	Date removed	Location	City or town	Description
1	Eugene Bavinger House	Eugene Bavinger House	December 13, 2001 (#01001354)	February 28, 2017	730 60th Ave., NE. 35°13′40″N 97°21′10″W	Norman	Demolished in 2012.
2	DeBarr Historic District	DeBarr Historic District	December 27, 1991 (#91001904)	November 12, 2018	Roughly bounded by Boyd St., DeBarr Ave., Duffy St., and the former ATSF railroad tracks 35°12′44″N 97°26′25″W	Norman	

== See also ==
- List of National Historic Landmarks in Oklahoma
- National Register of Historic Places listings in Oklahoma
