= 2023 Henryetta murders =

Familicide in Oklahoma, U.S.

2023 Henryetta killings
- Location: Okmulgee County, Oklahoma, U.S.
- Date: May 1, 2023
- Attack type: Mass shooting, murder-suicide, child rape
- Weapon: SCCY CPX-2 handgun
- Deaths: 7 (including the perpetrator)
- Injuries: 0
- Perpetrator: Jesse McFadden
- Motive: Unknown

On May 1, 2023, a mass shooting took place near Henryetta, Oklahoma, United States. The perpetrator, 39-year-old Jesse McFadden, killed his wife, her three children, and two teenage friends of his youngest stepdaughter before killing himself. The two visiting teenage girls were also raped before their deaths. McFadden, a repeat child sex offender, had been set to have a jury trial for other charges he faced on the day of the shooting.

== Killings ==
McFadden shot and killed his wife Holly McFadden, 35; Holly's three children Tiffany Guess, 13; Michael Mayo, 15; and Rylee Allen, 17, as well as Tiffany's friends Ivy Webster, 14, and Brittany Brewer, 15; furthermore, he raped Webster and Brewer, and all victims had been shot in the head, some multiple times, according to an autopsy report. He then killed himself with a shot to the head. McFadden had been scheduled for a jury trial that day for further sex offenses; the bodies were discovered hours before the trial was to begin. The Oklahoma Highway Patrol had issued an Amber alert for Webster and Brewer only hours before they were found among the dead. Police have stated that the shootings were perpetrated with a 9mm handgun that had been purchased by Holly in January 2022.

== Perpetrator ==
McFadden dropped out of high school in ninth grade In 2003, he was convicted of a rape committed in December 2002 in McAlester, Oklahoma, and sentenced to 20 years at the Joseph Harp Correctional Center in Lexington, serving 17 years before being released in 2020. In 2017, while serving his sentence, he was accused of sexting an underage girl. On the day of the shooting, he was scheduled to face trial for his 2017 offense after numerous delays.

== Aftermath ==
After the murders, Oklahoma state representative Scott Fetgatter advocated for stronger sentencing laws for serious sex crimes.

Brittany Brewer's father, Nathan Brewer, ran as a Democrat in the 2025 special election for the 8th district in the Oklahoma Senate, but lost to Republican candidate Bryan Logan.

== See also ==
- List of mass shootings in the United States in 2023
