= National Register of Historic Places listings in McClain County, Oklahoma =

Location of McClain County in Oklahoma

This is a list of the National Register of Historic Places listings in McClain County, Oklahoma.

This is intended to be a complete list of the properties on the National Register of Historic Places in McClain County, Oklahoma, United States. The locations of National Register properties for which the latitude and longitude coordinates are included below, may be seen on a map.

There are 5 properties listed on the National Register in the county.

This National Park Service list is complete through NPS recent listings posted December 19, 2025.

== Current listings ==
	Name on the Register	Image	Date listed	Location	City or town	Description
1	Harris Palace Store	Harris Palace Store	September 19, 2019 (#100004399)	214 E. Ripley St. 34°52′28″N 97°03′12″W	Byars	
2	Hotel Love	Hotel Love	December 7, 1995 (#95001407)	200 W. Main St. 35°00′44″N 97°21′41″W	Purcell	
3	McClain County Courthouse	McClain County Courthouse	August 23, 1984 (#84003347)	Courthouse Square; 35°00′47″N 97°21′40″W	Purcell	
4	US 77 James C. Nance Memorial Bridge	US 77 James C. Nance Memorial Bridge	September 2, 2003 (#03000882)	U.S. Route 77 over the Canadian River; 35°00′54″N 97°20′38″W	Purcell	Extends into Cleveland County
5	United States Post Office Purcell	United States Post Office Purcell	January 29, 2018 (#100002056)	228 W Main St. 35°00′44″N 97°21′44″W	Purcell	

== See also ==
- List of National Historic Landmarks in Oklahoma
- National Register of Historic Places listings in Oklahoma
