= Purcell, Oklahoma =

City in Oklahoma, US

- City
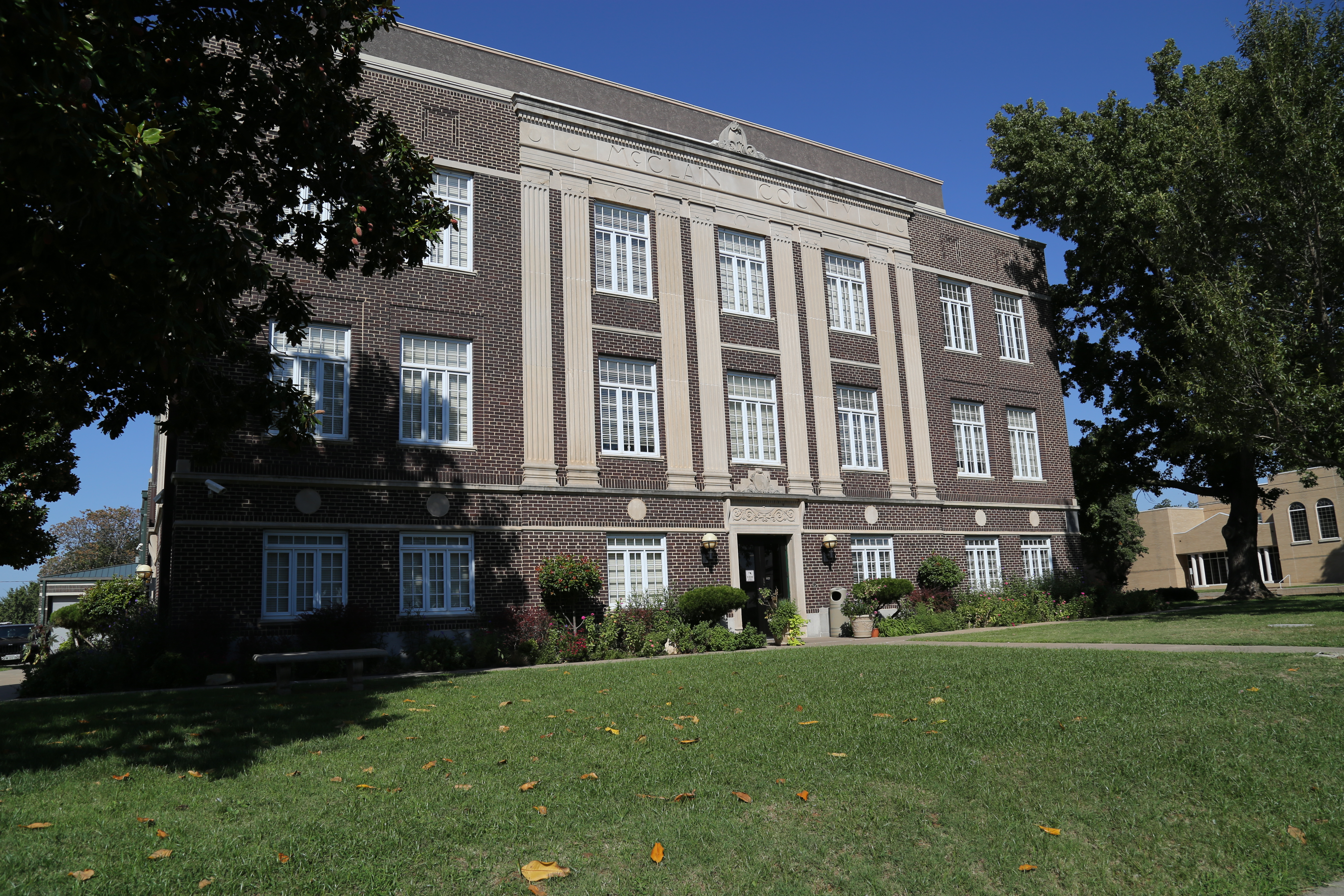
- McClain County Courthouse in Purcell
- Nicknames: Heart of Oklahoma, Quarterhorse Capital of the World, Queen City of the Chickasaw Nation
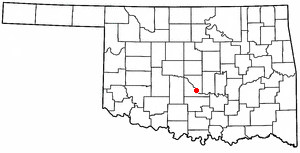
- Location in Oklahoma
- Coordinates: 35°1′3″N 97°22′10″W
- Country: United States
- State: Oklahoma
- County: McClain
- Incorporated: 1898

Government
  - Type: Council-Manager Charter
  - Mayor: Jay Tate
  - City Manager: Bobby Elmore

Area
  - Total: 15.73 sq mi (40.75 km^{2})
  - Land: 15.20 sq mi (39.36 km^{2})
  - Water: 0.53 sq mi (1.38 km^{2})
- Elevation: 1,099 ft (335 m)

Population (2020)
  - Total: 6,750
  - Density: 437.6/sq mi (168.96/km^{2})
- Time zone: UTC-6 (Central (CST))
  - Summer (DST): UTC-5 (CDT)
- ZIP code: 73080 (Purcell); 73095 (Wayne)
- Area code: 405
- FIPS code: 40-61150
- GNIS feature ID: 1096963
- Website: www.purcellok.gov

Purcell is a city in and the county seat of McClain County, Oklahoma, United States. As of the 2020 census, the city population was 6,651, a 13% increase from 2010.

Founded in 1887, Purcell was a railroad town named after Edward B. Purcell, an official with the Atchison, Topeka and Santa Fe Railway ("AT&SF").

Purcell is often called the "Quarterhorse Capital of the World", and its official motto is "Heart of Oklahoma." The city has registered trademarks on both titles.

== History ==
Purcell was at the north end of the Gulf, Colorado and Santa Fe Railway, owned by the AT&SF. Today, Amtrak serves the town with the Heartland Flyer at the station near the old AT&SF depot.

Purcell was the only town on the border of the Unassigned Lands, and began attracting hopeful settlers even before the Land Rush of 1889. Town lots went on sale April 5, 1887, and a post office was established 16 days later. The Purcell Register, the town's oldest newspaper, was established in 1887, and continued operating into the 21st Century. Residents elected the town's first mayor, James Taylor Bradley, on August 13, 1895. The town was incorporated on October 3, 1898.

Located on the Canadian River, it was called the "Queen City of the Chickasaw Nation." In 1895, one of the five district courts of the Chickasaw Nation was located in Purcell, with the first session opening November 18, 1895. The court house escaped destruction the next day, when a fire destroyed most of the buildings in the business district.

Construction of the Oklahoma Central Railroad ("OCR"), which would connect the Lehigh coal mines with Chickasha, reached Purcell in March 1907. The OCR located its main yards, barns and most of its equipment in Purcell. Although the OCR went bankrupt in the following year, its assets were acquired by the AT&SF.

== Geography ==
Purcell is within the Great Plains region, located at 35°1′3″N 97°22′10″W (35.017465, -97.369537). It is east of the center of McClain County and is bordered to the east by the Canadian River, which forms the border with Cleveland County. According to the U.S. Census Bureau, the city has a total area of 15.7 square miles (41 km^{2}), of which 15.2 square miles (39 km^{2}) are land and 0.5 square miles (1.3 km^{2}), or 3.40%, are water.

Purcell is located along the I-35 Corridor in the central part of the state, on a bluff overlooking the Canadian River valley within the Interior Plains region. It is 13 miles (21 km) south of Norman and 36 miles (58 km) south of Oklahoma City. The view from atop Purcell's Red Hill offers a scenic glimpse at both the South Canadian River and the University of Oklahoma campus in neighboring Norman.

The central core of Purcell is located at the intersection of US-77 and OK-74/OK-39. Access to I-35 is at the north and south ends of the town.

Prior to the construction of I-35, this route of US-77 was the heavily traveled road from Oklahoma City to Dallas.

== Demographics ==
Historical population
Census	Pop.	Note	%±
1900	2,277		—
1910	2,740		20.3%
1920	2,938		7.2%
1930	2,817		−4.1%
1940	3,116		10.6%
1950	3,546		13.8%
1960	3,729		5.2%
1970	4,076		9.3%
1980	4,638		13.8%
1990	4,784		3.1%
2000	5,571		16.5%
2010	5,884		5.6%
2020	6,651		13.0%
U.S. Decennial Census; 2020

=== 2020 census ===
As of the 2020 census, Purcell had a population of 6,651. The median age was 38.3 years. 25.1% of residents were under the age of 18 and 17.8% of residents were 65 years of age or older. For every 100 females there were 91.9 males, and for every 100 females age 18 and over there were 89.9 males.

81.2% of residents lived in urban areas, while 18.8% lived in rural areas.

There were 2,486 households in Purcell, of which 33.9% had children under the age of 18 living in them. Of all households, 48.6% were married-couple households, 18.4% were households with a male householder and no spouse or partner present, and 27.6% were households with a female householder and no spouse or partner present. About 27.6% of all households were made up of individuals and 12.9% had someone living alone who was 65 years of age or older.

There were 2,793 housing units, of which 11.0% were vacant. Among occupied housing units, 67.3% were owner-occupied and 32.7% were renter-occupied. The homeowner vacancy rate was 2.3% and the rental vacancy rate was 16.1%.

Racial composition as of the 2020 census
Race	Percent
White	69.3%
Black or African American	1.1%
American Indian and Alaska Native	7.8%
Asian	0.7%
Native Hawaiian and Other Pacific Islander	0.1%
Some other race	7.4%
Two or more races	13.6%
Hispanic or Latino (of any race)	16.6%

=== 2000 census ===
As of the 2000 census, there were 5,571 people, 2,120 households, and 1,500 families residing in the city. The population density was 560.1 inhabitants per square mile (216.3/km^{2}). There were 2,789 housing units at an average density of 233.3 per square mile (90.1/km^{2}). The racial makeup of the city was 81.60% White, 2.21% African American, 6.53% Native American, 0.29% Asian, 4.51% from other races, and 4.86% from two or more races. Hispanic or Latino of any race were 10.09% of the population.

There were 2,120 households, out of which 33.9% had children under the age of 18 living with them, 54.1% were married couples living together, 13.0% had a female householder with no husband present, and 29.2% were non-families. 26.2% of all households were made up of individuals, and 13.0% had someone living alone who was 65 years of age or older. The average household size was 2.54 and the average family size was 3.06.

In the city, the population was spread out, with 26.9% under the age of 18, 8.6% from 18 to 24, 28.6% from 25 to 44, 20.5% from 45 to 64, and 15.5% who were 65 years of age or older. The median age was 36 years. For every 100 females, there were 94.0 males. For every 100 females age 18 and over, there were 89.7 males.

The median income for a household in the city was $33,283, and the median income for a family was $36,128. Males had a median income of $25,494 versus $18,919 for females. The per capita income for the city was $15,261. About 12.5% of families and 14.4% of the population were below the poverty line, including 19.9% of those under age 18 and 7.5% of those age 65 or over.

== Economy ==
Purcell is a member of the Heart of Oklahoma Chamber of Commerce, and is at the center of a micropolitan trade area which includes the communities of Goldsby, Lexington, Washington, and Wayne. Several small businesses and banks are located in Purcell, including a Walmart Supercenter. Purcell has historically served as an agribusiness area and a center for Oklahoma's equestrian industry. Purcell is the site of the first planned double-wide trailer park with underground utilities, paved roads, greenbelts and other amenities, according to the Oklahoma Department of Commerce. The largest area employer is Oklahoma Department of Corrections at 2 nearby prison facilities Joseph Harp Correctional Center and Lexington Assessment and Reception Center, with other area employers including Tinker Air Force Base in Midwest City, Purcell Public Schools, and The City of Purcell (which operates electric, water and sewer service).

== Arts and culture ==
=== Historic landmarks ===
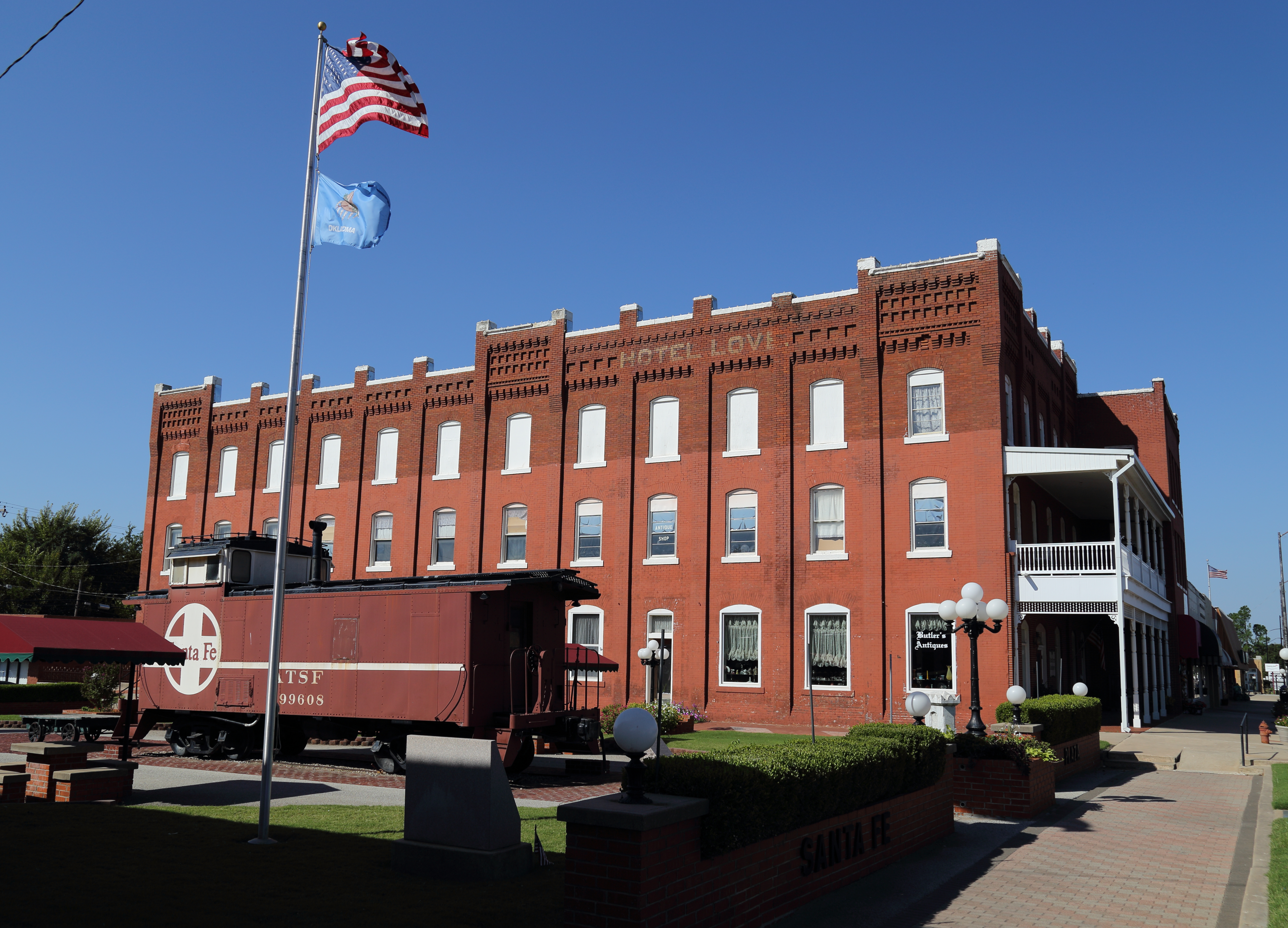
Love Hotel, Purcell

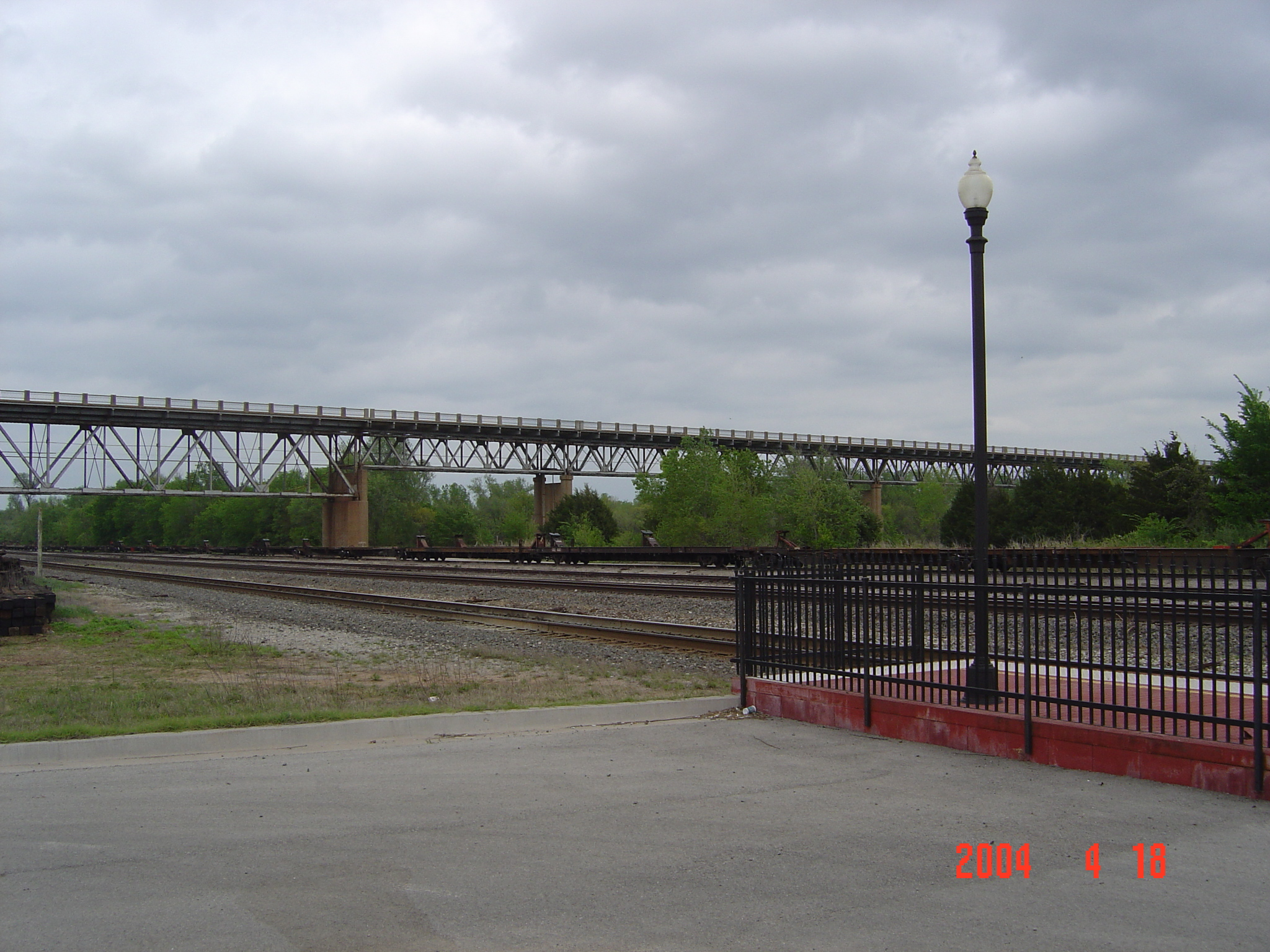
James C. Nance Memorial Bridge, viewed from Purcell train station

Purcell's downtown business district and its many historic buildings underwent major improvements and revitalization at a cost of over $1 million in the 1990s via the "U.S. Main Street" program. The improvements included new sidewalks, Victorian lamp posts, storefront restorations, and landscape islands in the downtown area.

Purcell has four sites that are NRHP-listed:

- Hotel Love, a three-story Victorian brick building that currently houses an antique store, a bed and breakfast inn, and retail offices/storefronts.
- McClain County Courthouse, a turn-of-the-century three-story brick building. It underwent a $2 million restoration in 1995.
- US 77 James C. Nance Memorial Bridge, at Canadian River, connecting Purcell to Lexington.
- United States Post Office Purcell, located at 228 W Main Street.

=== Historic site of Federal Courthouse for Indian Territory ===
The site of the now demolished U.S. Federal Courthouse for Indian Territory, at the east end of Main Street, is landmark site of the former court of jurisdiction for Indian Territory. Prior to demolition, it was renovated into a car dealer showroom, later used as a fitness center and finally a retail floral shop before it became structurally unsound and demolished. The territorial courthouse was established under the Nonintercourse Act.

Beginning with the Dawes Act of 1887, Congress passed several laws designed to divide and allocate land between members of the Cherokee, Chickasaw, Choctaw, Creek and Seminole tribes in the Indian Territory (modern-day Oklahoma). As part of this scheme, subsequent legislation authorized a “Commission to the Five Civilized Tribes,” commonly known as the Dawes Commission, to determine the citizenship of Native Americans claiming membership in these tribes. Unsuccessful applicants were entitled to appeal to the United States District Court for Indian Territory which was located on the east end of Main Street in Purcell OK.

== Parks and recreation ==
Facilities include:

- Brent Bruehl Memorial Golf Course
- Purcell Multipurpose Center, featuring an indoor gym
- Purcell City Lake
- Sharp Memorial Park, featuring a playground and splashpad
- McCurdy Park
- Santa Fe Plaza, featuring a Santa Fe Caboose

== Government ==
Purcell has a Council-Manager Charter form of government. The city council consists of five elected members who serve three-year terms, with one or two members facing election annually. The mayor and a vice mayor are selected by the council members to preside over its meetings. The city's council members also serve as trustees for the Purcell Public Works Authority (PPWA) which manages city services such as water, wastewater, electric, and solid waste collection, in addition to the Purcell Municipal Hospital and the city golf course. The city council/PPWA members appoint the City Manager.

== Education ==
The majority of Purcell is in the Purcell Public Schools school district. Some southern parts of the municipality are in the Wayne Public Schools school district.

Schools in the Purcell district include:

- Purcell High School
- Purcell Jr High School
- Purcell Intermediate School
- Purcell Elementary School

== Infrastructure ==
=== Transportation ===
Purcell's Amtrak train station features daily rail service via the Heartland Flyer.

Purcell Municipal-Steven E. Shephard Field has a paved runway, and was renamed in 2005 to honor a Purcell High School alumnus who became a U.S. pilot and died in the Iraq War.

Highways include:

- Interstate 35
- U.S. Highway 77
- State Highway 39
- State Highway 74.
- State Highway 77C in downtown Purcell.

The James C. Nance Memorial Bridge, originally built circa 1938, connects Purcell with Lexington across the Canadian River via U.S. Route 77.

=== Health care ===
Purcell Municipal Hospital (PMH) a 50-bed acute care facility and emergency room, owned by the City of Purcell. The hospital ended surgery services in 2018. A new PMH hospital facility began construction in 2020.

== Notable people ==
- Earl Bartlett, professional football player
- Lisa Johnson Billy, member of Oklahoma House of Representatives
- Eric Buterbaugh, American florist and perfumer
- Wallace Fox, film director
- Lester Lane, gold medal winner in the 1960 Olympics
- Tom Lester, actor and former school teacher in Purcell, best known for TV role as farmhand Eb Dawson on Green Acres
- F. C. Love, president of the Kerr-McGee oil company
- Bill McClard, professional football player
- James C. Nance, newspaper publisher and politician
- Parker Millsap, alt-country and blues musician
- William T. Pheiffer, Representative from New York in 77th Congress, and ambassador to the Dominican Republic
- Joe Simpson, professional baseball player
- Bert Seabourn, American artist and painter
- Kevin Ray Underwood, murderer
- Charles W. Wantland, coach
- Neil B. Ward, meteorologist and storm chaser
- David W. Whitlock, 15th president of Oklahoma Baptist University

== See also ==
- National Register of Historic Places listings in Cleveland County, Oklahoma
- National Register of Historic Places listings in McClain County, Oklahoma
- BC Clark Jewelers
