= Central Oklahoma Bronchos =

- University: University of Central Oklahoma
- Nickname: Broncho
- NCAA: Division II
- Conference: MIAA
- Athletic director: Stan Wagnon
- Location: Edmond, Oklahoma
- Varsity teams: 14 (5 men's, 9 women's)
- Football stadium: Chad Richison Stadium
- Basketball arena: Hamilton Field House
- Baseball stadium: Wendell Simmons Field
- Softball stadium: Gerry Pinkston Stadium
- Soccer stadium: Tom Thompson Field
- Rowing venue: UCO Boathouse at the Oklahoma River
- Colors: Blue and bronze
- Mascot: Buddy Broncho
- Fight song: UCO Fight Song
- Website: bronchosports.com

The Central Oklahoma Bronchos, are the intercollegiate athletic teams representing University of Central Oklahoma, located in Edmond, Oklahoma. The five men's and nine women's varsity teams are called the "Bronchos". The school's identification as Bronchos dates back to 1922, when the wife of football coach Charles W. Wantland suggested it for the school's mascot. The official colors of the teams are bronze and blue, which the institution adopted in 1895. The Bronchos compete in the NCAA's Division II and in the Mid-America Intercollegiate Athletic Association in all sports except women's rowing, which competes in the Great Northwest Athletic Conference. The Bronchos have won 23 national championships, with the most recent coming in 2024 as the wrestling program won the NCAA Division II Wrestling Championships. The university's current athletic director is Stan Wagnon, who has served in the position since 2020.

== History ==
The Central Oklahoma Bronchos joined the Mid-America Intercollegiate Athletics Association (MIAA) in 2012, along with in-state rival Northeastern State University. Previously, Central Oklahoma competed in the first Oklahoma Intercollegiate Conference (OIC) from 1919 to 1929; the Oklahoma Collegiate Athletic Conference from 1929 to 1974; was a charter member of the second Oklahoma Intercollegiate Conference from 1974 to 1977; as an NAIA Independent from 1977 to 1987, and the Lone Star Conference (LSC) from 1988 to 2011. The Bronchos participated in the LSC's North Division from 1997 to 2011. In the 2011–12 athletic season, the Bronchos participated as an NCAA Division II independent before joining the MIAA the following year as part of its transition after leaving the LSC.

== Sports sponsored ==
MIAA logo in UCO's colors

| Men's sports | Women's sports |
|---|---|
| Baseball | Basketball |
| Basketball | Cross country |
| Football | Golf |
| Golf | Rowing |
| Wrestling | Soccer |
| | Softball |
| | Tennis |
| | Track and field^{†} |
| | Volleyball |
† – Track and field includes both indoor and outdoor

=== Football ===
Bronchos football
| National; Champions 1962 | National; Champions 1982 |

The University of Central Oklahoma football team began in 1902 and has since compiled over 600 wins, two national championships, and 27 conference championships. As of 2023, the Bronchos were ranked fifth in NCAA Division II for total wins. The Bronchos won several conference championships under Charles W. Wantland, Claude Reeds, and Dale E. Hamilton. In 1962, the Bronchos went 11–0 on the season and defeated Lenoir-Rhyne University (NC) 28–13 in the Camellia Bowl to claim its first NAIA national championship. Twenty years later, Central Oklahoma defended its home turf and defeated Colorado Mesa University (then Mesa State College) 14–11 in the NAIA national championship game to take its second title and finish the season with a 10–2 record.

Despite its rich history in football, Central Oklahoma has struggled beginning in the late 2000s, posting five winning seasons since 2008. The decline in performance coincided with the NCAA's decision to place the Bronchos on three years probation for "lack of institutional control", starting in 2008. Chuck Langston, the Bronchos' head coach during the period when the rules violations occurred, was fired and replaced by Tracy Holland. As a result of penalties, UCO's roster was reduced from 100 players to 90 players each season during the probation, and Holland's win–loss record declined each year. In December 2011, Tracy Holland was fired as head coach after compiling a 15–29 record during his four seasons at the helm. The following month, Nick Bobeck, a former fullback for the Bronchos, was hired to take the reins as head football coach at UCO. The Bronchos finished Bobeck's first two seasons with identical 2–8 records. In 2014, the Bronchos rebounded to finish third in the MIAA with an 8–3 record and a Mineral Water Bowl appearance. The Bronchos subsequently made appearances in the Live United Texarkana Bowl, the Corsicana Bowl, and the C.H.A.M.P.S. Heart of Texas Bowl winning all three games. The Bronchos are currently led by head coach Adam Dorrel who took over the program beginning with the 2022 season.

The Bronchos play their home games at Chad Richison Stadium, a 12,000 capacity football stadium built in 1965. The Bronchos have enjoyed nine undefeated home seasons and are 5–1 in playoff games at the venue. As of 2023, their current record at home stands at 177–103–5, a .630 winning percentage.

=== Men's basketball ===
The men's basketball team has enjoyed recent success and rose to national prominence since the early 2000s with head coach Terry Evans and national Division II player of the year Daunte Williams. It currently plays in Hamilton Field House. While the team has never won a national championship, it has played in 17 national tournaments, and has made the NAIA and NCAA Division II Elite Eight four times. The team played in the 2008 Elite Eight, and lost to Augusta State University in double overtime. The Bronchos hosted the South Central Regional in 2011 but lost to Midwestern State in the Regional finals.

The Bronchos have had at least two players in the BBA/NBA, Eddie Robinson who played five seasons with the Charlotte Hornets and the Chicago Bulls and Ken Corley who played briefly for the Cleveland Rebels. UCO hired former Mercer and UTRGV coach Bob Hoffman in 2019. During Hoffman's tenure, the Bronchos made NCAA Division II men's basketball tournament appearances in 2022, and 2023.

=== Baseball ===
The Central Oklahoma Baseball team began in 1896, and is currently coached by John Martin. The Bronchos have ten national tournament appearances, as most recently as 2019. The program had 16 All Americans, and 15 since 1990. The Bronchos highest national finish came in 1997, when they finished runner-up to Chico State in the NCAA Division II Baseball Championship. Their home field is Wendell Simmons Field, named after the Bronchos' coach from 1992 to 2010.

=== Wrestling ===
With nine NCAA Division II team national championships and eight NAIA championships, wrestling is one of the most successful sports at Central Oklahoma. The team is coached by Todd Steidley, who in 2016 took over from twelve time national champion David James. The Central Oklahoma wrestling team began in 1921. The program found immediate success, finishing in a second place tie with Oklahoma A&M in the 1936 NCAA Championship. Ray Clemons, the Bronchos champion in the 191 pound weight class that year, also wrestled in as a light heavyweight in men's freestyle competitions in the 1936 Summer Olympics. In 1947 the school cut the program. Wrestling returned to campus in 1972 under coach Jimmy Rogers. After two years at the Division II ranks, the program became an NAIA power, winning national championships under Eddie Griffin in 1979, 1981, and 1982. James took over the program and won five more NAIA crowns in 1984, 1985, 1986, 1987, and 1989. In the 1990s after rejoining Division II, the Bronchos enjoyed a streak of four straight national championships (1992–1995). UCO's five most recent crowns came in 2002, 2003, 2007, 2023, and 2024. Mixed Martial Artist and current UFC fighters Tim Elliott and Muhammed Lawal wrestled for the Bronchos while attending Central Oklahoma.

=== Softball ===
The university decided to create the women's varsity softball program in 1975 and the Central Oklahoma softball team officially started competing under former head coach Gerry Pinkston. Since the beginning of the program, the program has won several championships, five conference championships (three in the Lone Star Conference, and two in the MIAA), and one national championship. The program has made eleven appearances in the NCAA tournament, including three appearances in the NCAA Division II Women's College World Series (2012, 2013, 2023), and one College World Series national championship (2013).

The Bronchos most recently won the MIAA regular season and tournament championship in 2023. In 2012, they played for the NCAA softball championship in the Women's College World Series, losing to the UC San Diego Tritons in the semifinals. The Bronchos advanced to the finals of the 2013 Women's College World Series this time defeating the Kutztown Golden Bears to win their first national championship.

The current head coach is Cody White; the 2017 season was his fourth as the Bronchos' coach. He was previously the Bronchos' assistant coach, and a softball and baseball assistant at Edmond Memorial High School. He played baseball for Southern Nazarene University.

The Bronchos softball team plays its home games at the Gerry Pinkston Stadium, which has recently been renovated.

=== Men's golf ===
The Central Oklahoma men's golf program is currently led by Derrick Thompson. The Bronchos have had two golfers win the individual national championship, Dax Johnston in 1996, and Josh Creel in 2011. The Bronchos have finished as high as third in the national tournament.

=== Women's golf ===
The Central Oklahoma women's golf program is currently led by Michael Bond. The Bronchos have finished as high as sixth in the national tournament. In 2010, two Broncho golfers and sisters Lindsey and Erica Bensch both made an ace on the same day.

=== Rowing ===
Women's rowing was established by the university in 2008. The team competes from a state-of-the-art boathouse facility located on the Oklahoma River. In addition to accommodating the UCO rowing team, the facility is used as a training facility for United States Olympic and Paralympic programs. The Bronchos won three consecutive NCAA Division II Rowing Championships in 2018, 2019, and 2021.

== Facilities ==
- Chad Richison Stadium is home for Broncho football. First used in 1965, it went under a $16 Million renovation in 2005 and a further $10 Million renovation in 2022, increasing the seating capacity to 12,000.
- Gerry Pinkston Stadium (formerly Broncho Field) is the home of Broncho softball. The facility was constructed in 1994. In 2016, the facility underwent a $2.4 million renovation as part of the "Complete the Dream" campaign. The stadium adopted its new name in October 2021.
- Hamilton Field House is the 3,000-seat multipurpose arena located on the campus of the university. It serves as the home for Broncho Basketball, Volleyball, and Wrestling.
- Tom Thompson Field is the home for Broncho soccer. The facility was constructed in 1996 to prepare for the first season of the soccer program in 1998. It has since undergone renovations and has hosted the finals of the 2015 Women's Premier Soccer League.
- Wendell Simmons Field is the home for Broncho baseball. The facility seats roughly 1,400 and is located on the North side of the campus. It was renamed in 2011 after long-time Bronchos coach Wendell Simmons who retired in 2010.

== Championships ==
=== NCAA/NAIA team championships ===
In their 120-year history of intercollegiate competition, the University of Central Oklahoma's varsity athletic teams have won 22 national team championships (including 12 sponsored by the National Collegiate Athletic Association (NCAA), and 10 by the National Association of Intercollegiate Athletics (NAIA).

Men's national championships

- Football (2): 1962 • 1982
- Wrestling (17): 1979 • 1981 • 1982 • 1984 • 1985 • 1986 • 1987 • 1989 • 1992 • 1993 • 1994 • 1995 • 2002 • 2003 • 2007 • 2023 • 2024

Women's national championships

- Rowing (3): 2018 • 2019 • 2021
- Softball (1): 2013

=== Conference championships ===
The University of Central Oklahoma is a member of the Mid-America Intercollegiate Athletics Association (MIAA), and fourteen of the fifteen Broncho sports teams compete in the MIAA. The MIAA does not sponsor women's rowing. Since the Bronchos joined the MIAA in 2012. Central Oklahoma's varsity athletic teams have won 103 total conference championship and six MIAA team championships. Prior to MIAA competition, the Bronchos competed in the Lone Star Conference, from 1988 to 2011. The second incarnation of the Oklahoma Intercollegiate Conference, Oklahoma Collegiate Athletic Conference, and the first incarnation of the OIC. Women's rowing competes in the Great Northwest Athletic Conference. The Bronchos conference championships include:

Men's conference championships

- Baseball (15): 1929 • 1936 • 1937 • 1939 • 1947 • 1948 • 1963 • 1994 • 1997 • 2001 • 2002 • 2003 • 2005 • 2006• 2018
- Basketball (18): 1937 • 1938 • 1939 • 1953 • 1954 • 1958 • 1963 • 1964 • 1974 • 1991 • 1992 • 1993 • 1995 • 1997 • 1998 • 2008 • 2010 • 2022
- Cross Country (2): 1989 • 1990
- Football (27): 1914 • 1915 • 1921 • 1923 • 1924 • 1929 • 1931 • 1932 • 1934 • 1935 • 1936 • 1937 • 1938 • 1939 • 1941 • 1942 • 1948 • 1949 • 1950 • 1954 • 1955 • 1956 • 1961 • 1962 • 1972 • 1998 • 1999
- Golf (7): 2000 • 2002 • 2003 • 2011 • 2013 • 2016 • 2017
- Wrestling (5): 2013 • 2017 • 2020 • 2022 • 2023

Women's conference championships

- Cross country (1) 2000
- Golf (6): 2004 • 2005 • 2013 • 2014 • 2015 • 2017
- Rowing (2): 2021 • 2023
- Soccer (7): 2000 • 2002 • 2005 • 2006 • 2009 • 2018 • 2019
- Softball (8): 1998 • 2005 • 2009 • 2013 • 2017 • 2019 • 2021 • 2023
- Tennis (4): 1998 • 2019 •2021 •2022
- Volleyball (1): 1994

== Athletic directors ==
The Bronchos have had nine athletic directors.

| Athletic Director | Years |
|---|---|
| Charles W. Wantland | 1912–1931 |
| Claude Reeds | 1931–1940 |
| Dale E. Hamilton | 1941–1976 |
| Charles Murdock | 1976–1986 |
| Skip Wagnon | 1986–2003 |
| Bill Farley | 2003–2008 |
| Joe Muller | 2008–2017 |
| Eddie Griffin | 2017–2020 |
| Stan Wagnon | 2020–present |

== Traditions ==
=== School colors ===
| Bronze | Blue |

Central Oklahoma's official school colors are bronze and blue. Edmund Murdaugh, the president of the institution, selected these colors in 1895. The first recorded use of these colors was in 1895 as a student represented Territorial Normal School with these colors at an oratory competition in Guthrie, Oklahoma.

=== Mascot ===
The Central Oklahoma Bronchos mascot is Buddy Broncho, who has served as UCO's mascot since 1932.

In 2025, UCO expanded the mascot program and added Buck Broncho to the team.

== Non–varsity/club sports ==
The university also offers various sports outside of the NCAA at the club level:

- Co-ed bass fishing
- Co-ed bowling
- Co-ed cheerleading
- Women's stunt
- Men's ice hockey
- Co-ed sailing
- Men's soccer

=== Ice hockey ===
The UCO men's ice hockey team was founded in 2006 and currently competes in the American Collegiate Hockey Association as an independent team at the ACHA Division I level. UCO Bronchos main rival is the University of Oklahoma Sooners. The home games are played off campus at the Arctic Edge Ice Arena and is coached by Craig McAlister, the American Collegiate Hockey Association Division I Coach of the Year for 2008–2009. The 2009–10 season saw the Bronchos advance to the Semi-Final Round of the ACHA Men's Division I National Tournament before losing to the eventual nation champions, Lindenwood University. The 2010 fourth-place finish was the team's highest in its history at the time; following the season the team was honored by the Oklahoma House of Representatives. The team finished the 2011–12 regular season with a 15–22–1 record and qualified for the 2012 ACHA Division I Nationals, ranked 15th. UCO defeated Kent State 2–1 in the opening round before the team lost to Lindenwood 5–2 in the round. In 2015, the hockey club captured the ACHA National Championship with a win over Stony Brook by a score of 4–0. In 2017, the hockey club captured their second ACHA National Championship with a win over Ohio by a score of 3–0.

=== Men's track and field ===
In 2012, the Men's Track & Field team was reorganized. Although short lived, they did secure the USATF Southwest Regional Championship the same year.

=== Rugby ===
The University of Central Oklahoma Rugby Football Club existed from 2007 to 2011. The rugby team recorded their most famous victory of The University of Tulsa on January 31, 2009, by winning the match 26–0.

=== Cheerleading ===
The University of Central Oklahoma Cheerleaders currently compete in the Universal Cheerleaders Association in Division II coached by Jenni Hawkins since April 2019.

They have won 11 National Cheerleaders Association national team championships in the following divisions:

NCA Intermediate All Girl Div. II Cheer National Champions - 2007, 2016, and 2017. NCA All-Girl II Cheer National Champions - 2002, 2003, 2012, and 2013. NCA Co-Ed Intermediate National Champions - 2008, 2009, 2010. NCA Small Co-Ed II National Champions - 2004

==== STUNT ====
The University of Central Oklahoma STUNT team competes in Stunt Division II coached by Jenni Hawkins since April 2019.

They have won 3 Stunt national team championships in the following years: 2012, 2013, and 2014
