= Hall Park, Oklahoma =

Neighborhood in Oklahoma, US

- Town
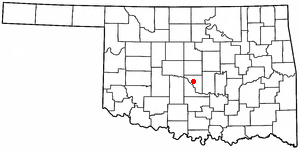
- Location of Hall Park, Oklahoma
- Coordinates: 35°14′27″N 97°24′25″W
- Country: United States
- State: Oklahoma
- County: Cleveland

Area
  - Total: 1.1 sq mi (2.9 km^{2})
  - Land: 1.0 sq mi (2.7 km^{2})
  - Water: 0.039 sq mi (0.1 km^{2})
- Elevation: 1,184 ft (361 m)

Population (2000)
  - Total: 1,088
  - Density: 1,027/sq mi (396.6/km^{2})
- Time zone: UTC-6 (Central (CST))
  - Summer (DST): UTC-5 (CDT)
- FIPS code: 40-32100
- GNIS feature ID: 1093489

Hall Park is a neighborhood in Norman, Oklahoma. It was originally a town in Cleveland County, Oklahoma, United States and part of the Oklahoma City Metropolitan Area. It began in the 1960s and is named after the founder Ike Hall. At the time of the 2000 census, the town population was 1,088 prior to becoming part of the City of Norman.

Hall Park is notable for being established as Oklahoma's first "all-electric" town. Ronald Reagan, then a spokesman for General Electric, visited Hall Park upon its opening and was bestowed an honorary mayoralty. Hall Park was unique in establishing common-area backyards, resulting in a lot of public space per square mile.

Financial and infrastructure troubles plagued Hall Park throughout its history. The arsenic groundwater regulations established in January 2001 resulted in Hall Park's only independent water sources being declared in violation of federal drinking water standards.

In 2003, Hall Park was annexed by Norman, and ceased to be a town, becoming instead a group of housing subdivisions. Ike Hall's daughter purchased the Hall Park water tower, which now sits in her yard.

== Geography ==
Hall Park was located at 35°14′27″N 97°24′25″W (35.240885, -97.407018).

According to the United States Census Bureau, the town had a total area of 1.1 square miles (2.8 km^{2}), of which 1.1 square miles (2.8 km^{2}) was land and 0.1 square miles (0.26 km^{2}) (4.50%) was water.

== Demographics ==
As of the census of 2000, there were 1,088 people, 376 households, and 324 families residing in the town. The population density was 1,027.2 inhabitants per square mile (396.6/km^{2}). There were 382 housing units at an average density of 360.7 per square mile (139.3/km^{2}). The racial makeup of the town was 88.97% White, 2.39% African American, 2.02% Native American, 1.38% Asian, 0.09% from other races, and 5.15% from two or more races. Hispanic or Latino of any race were 1.93% of the population.

There were 376 households, out of which 43.4% had children under the age of 18 living with them, 76.9% were married couples living together, 8.0% had a female householder with no husband present, and 13.8% were non-families. 11.2% of all households were made up of individuals, and 4.5% had someone living alone who was 65 years of age or older. The average household size was 2.89 and the average family size was 3.13.

In the town, the population was spread out, with 30.1% under the age of 18, 6.3% from 18 to 24, 24.4% from 25 to 44, 29.0% from 45 to 64, and 10.3% who were 65 years of age or older. The median age was 39 years. For every 100 females, there were 95.0 males. For every 100 females age 18 and over, there were 90.3 males.

The median income for a household in the town was $68,173, and the median income for a family was $70,536. Males had a median income of $52,813 versus $33,750 for females. The per capita income for the town was $25,658. About 1.7% of families and 2.3% of the population were below the poverty line, including 4.8% of those under age 18 and 2.9% of those age 65 or over.
