= Joseph Harp Correctional Center =

Prison in Oklahoma, United States

Joseph Harp Correctional Center (JHCC)
- Location in Oklahoma
- Location: Lexington, Oklahoma; 35.03102°N 97.20269°W
- Status: Operational
- Security class: Medium
- Capacity: 1,378
- Population: 1,372 (April 10, 2017)
- Opened: 1978; 48 years ago
- Managed by: Oklahoma Department of Corrections
- Warden: David Rogers
- Website: = Oklahoma Department of Corrections - Joseph Harp Correctional Center

Joseph Harp Correctional Center (JHCC) is an Oklahoma Department of Corrections state prison for male inmates located in Lexington, Cleveland County, Oklahoma. The medium-security facility opened in September 1978.

JHCC was named for Joseph Harp. who served as warden of the Oklahoma State Reformatory from 1949 to 1969. Regarded by his colleagues as an innovative leader and professional in the field of corrections, he recognized that a high school education was one of the greatest needs that many inmates had lacked which could prevent them from gaining legal employment and oftentimes led to a life of crime. Under Harp's leadership, Oklahoma State Reformatory was one of the first correctional institutions to establish a fully-accredited high school inside prison walls.

According to JHCC, 84 percent of its inmates are incarcerated for committing a violent crime, and ten percent have committed first-degree murder. Inmates typically work in the Oklahoma Correctional Industries program, manufacturing furniture or performing data entry to convert old paper records to digital documents.

The center offers adult education programs and encourages inmates to earn a GED while serving their sentences. Offenders sentenced as youths for short periods typically arrive under the delayed sentence program. If the youth does well, he may qualify for release with a suspended sentence, if he does not do well, he will be formally sentenced.

== Notable Inmates ==
- Jonathan Scott Graham - Murdered Gary Dale Larson and raped his wife Janet in Edmond, Oklahoma on August 16, 1986. He was sentenced to three consecutive life sentences. Story was told on season 13, episode 11 of Forensic Files on trutv.
- Robert Bever - Murdered his parents and three siblings with the help of his brother on July 22, 2015. He was sentenced to six consecutive life sentences without the possibility of parole.
- Jesse McFadden - Served 17 years from 2003 until 2020 for convictions of rape before released in 2020. Three years later, McFadden shot six people before killing himself in the 2023 Henryetta killings.
- Gordon Todd Skinner - a drug dealer who was convicted for kidnapping.
- Keith P. Sweeney - Former OKC police officer and United States Navy Chief Petty Officer, convicted in Dec 2019 of 2nd degree Murder. Also convicted of computer crimes in connection with possession of child pornography while incarcerated.
