= Earl Bartlett =

American football player (1908–1987)

Earl "Cowboy" Bartlett
No. 44
- Position: Halfback

Personal information
- Born: December 16, 1908; Purcell, Oklahoma, U.S.
- Died: January 26, 1987 (aged 78); Danville, Kentucky, U.S.

Career information
- College: Centre College
- NFL draft: 1939: undrafted

Career history
- Boston Shamrocks (1936); Pittsburgh Pirates (1939)

Career NFL statistics
- Games: 1
- Stats at Pro Football Reference

Earl Elburn "Cowboy" Bartlett (December 16, 1908 – January 26, 1987) was a professional American football halfback in the National Football League (NFL). He was born in Purcell, Oklahoma. He played college football at Centre College.
