= Newalla, Oklahoma =

Newalla
- Unincorporated community
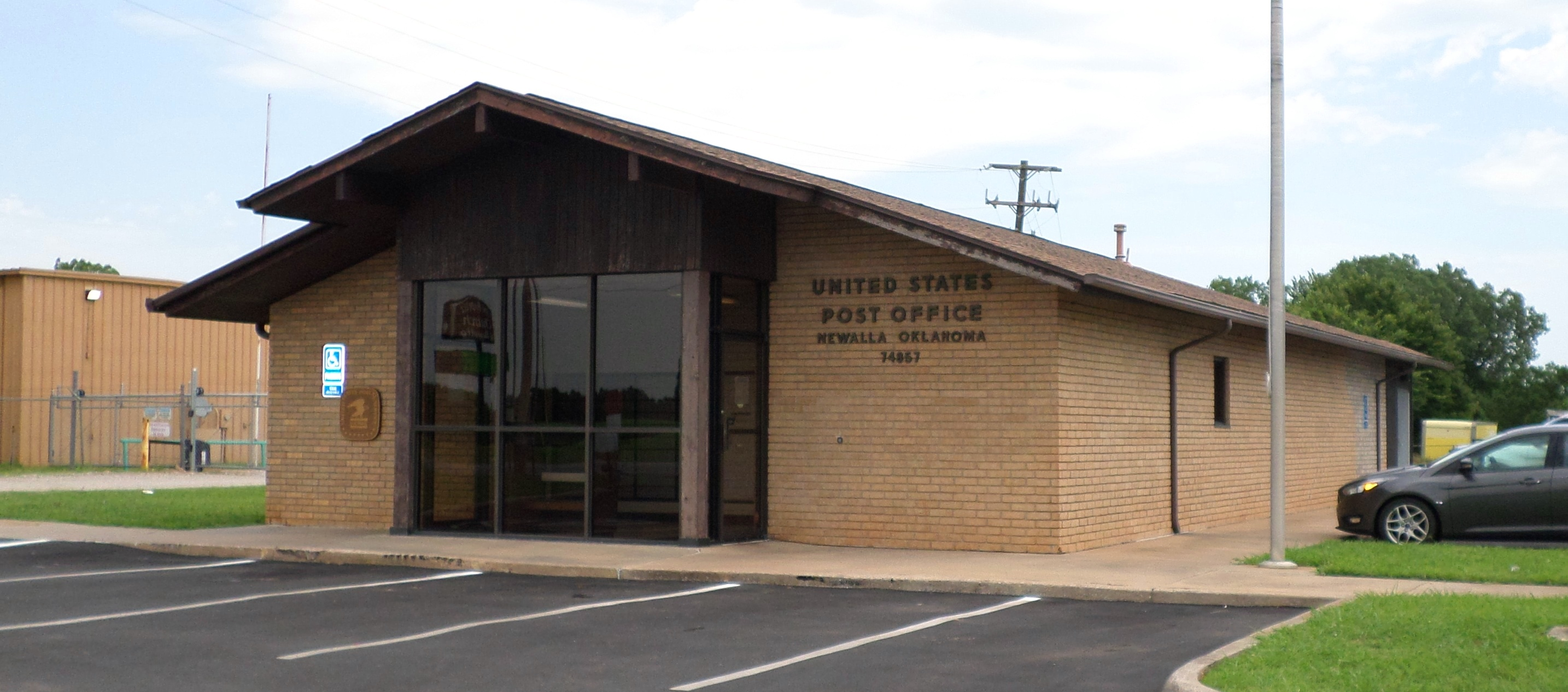
- Newalla Post Office

- Location within the state of Oklahoma Newalla (the United States)
- Coordinates: 35°24′18″N 97°9′46″W
- Country: United States
- State: Oklahoma
- County: Oklahoma
- Elevation: 1,145 ft (349 m)
- Time zone: UTC-6 (Central (CST))
  - Summer (DST): UTC-5 (CDT)
- ZIP code: 74857
- Area code: 405
- GNIS feature ID: 1095849

Newalla is an unincorporated community in eastern Oklahoma County, Oklahoma, United States. Newalla is an adaption of the Osage name for the Canadian River. The post office was opened June 22, 1904.

Located just west of State Highway 270, north of Interstate 40, it is a part of the Oklahoma City Metropolitan Area.

Newalla, with a current elevation of 1,148 feet, is located within the Eastern bounds of Oklahoma County and appears on the Harrah, Oklahoma U.S. Geological Survey Map due to their proximity. Newalla is a geographic area which spans unincorporated Oklahoma County and unincorporated Cleveland County (also referred to as Little Axe). Portions of Newalla are also within Oklahoma City Limits. School districts that provide educational services to the community are the following: McLoud Public Schools, Harrah Public School, Choctaw Public Schools, Little Axe Public Schools, Mid-Del Public Schools, as well as Norman and Moore Public Schools. The estimated population of Newalla, Oklahoma is currently at 9,518.

Newalla has a site on the NRHP, being the Union School District 19 1/2 building. This is an historically black two-room schoolhouse with a poured-in-place concrete, partial, two-room basement constructed circa 1936. It is located at the southwest corner of 149th St. and S. Luther Rd.

== Sources ==
Shirk, George H.; Oklahoma Place Names; University of Oklahoma Press; Norman, Oklahoma; 1987: ISBN 0-8061-2028-2
