= James C. Nance =

American politician

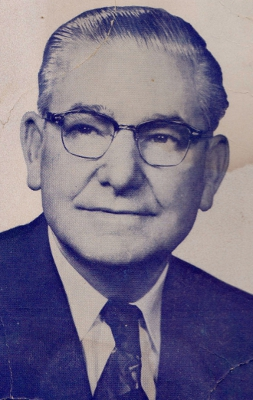

16th and 30th Speaker of the Oklahoma House of Representatives
- In office 1953–1955
- Preceded by: James M. Bullard
- Succeeded by: B.E. Bill Harkey
- In office January 8, 1929 – 1931
- Preceded by: Allen Street
- Succeeded by: Carlton Weaver

Member of the Oklahoma House of Representatives from the McClain County district
- In office 1956–1960
- Preceded by: Henry H. Montgomery
- Succeeded by: Norman A. Smith
- In office 1952–1954
- Preceded by: James R. Williams
- Succeeded by: Henry H. Montgomery

President Pro Tempore of the Oklahoma Senate
- In office 1947–1949
- Preceded by: Homer Paul
- Succeeded by: Bill Logan

Member of the Oklahoma Senate from the 19th district
- In office 1938–1950
- Preceded by: E. V. George
- Succeeded by: Joe A. Smalley

Member of the Oklahoma House of Representatives
- In office 1936–1938
- Preceded by: Louie W. Beck
- Succeeded by: Purman Wilson
- In office 1926–1932
- Preceded by: J. M. Hooper
- Succeeded by: Bob Mooney
- In office 1920–1922
- Preceded by: L. Akers
- Succeeded by: P. D. Sullivan
- Constituency: Stephens County (1920-1922); Cotton County (1926-1932; McClain County (1936-1938)

Personal details
- Born: August 27, 1893; Rogers, Arkansas
- Died: September 3, 1984 (aged 91); Purcell, Oklahoma
- Occupation: Newspaperman; publisher; politician
- Known for: Uniform Commercial Code and Uniform Law Commission

James Clark "Jim" Nance (August 27, 1893 – September 3, 1984) was a leader for 40 years in the Oklahoma Legislature in the U.S. state of Oklahoma and was community newspaper chain publisher 66 years. Nance served as Speaker of the Oklahoma House of Representatives and President pro tempore of the Oklahoma Senate. During his legislative career, Nance wrote the "Honest Mistake" law which became a model for other states. Nance then became a key sponsor and Legislative Chairman of the U.S. Uniform Law Commission (ULC), sponsored by the National Conference of Commissioners on Uniform State Laws, a non-partisan advisory panel which drafted uniform acts and uniform state commerce laws. Nance became known as a legislative expert in a 40-year legislative career as one of two Oklahomans to hold the top posts in both chambers of the Oklahoma Legislature. The state's largest newspaper, The Daily Oklahoman wrote he was the "longest serving Oklahoma Legislator" and "A Legislator's Legislator." Nance, a Democrat, is the only Oklahoma House Speaker elected through a bipartisan coalition of Democrats and Republicans. Fiercely independent, Nance considered public policy work to be a service and did not ever accept a salary or pension for any of his 40 years in the legislature and 24 years on the Uniform Law Commission. Nance refused to work as a lobbyist, although he had many offers after leaving office.

== Historic bipartisan election as House Speaker ==
Nance was a lifelong registered Democrat with a fiercely independent bi-partisan streak. Nance made Oklahoma history in being elected as Oklahoma's first and only bi-partisan coalition Speaker of the House in 1929. Nance was elected with a coalition of dissident Democrats voting in solidarity with the Republican caucus of legislators which ousted the incumbent House Speaker Allan Street, the Democrat establishment candidate. Nance is one of two men in Oklahoma who have been elected both Speaker of the House of Representatives and President Pro Tempore of the Senate. Tom Anglin is the other former official. Nance has the additional distinction of serving twice as Speaker and lengthy service as a life member of the U.S. Uniform Law Commission (ULC).

== Career ==
=== Oklahoma newspaperman 1918–1984 ===
Nance was a publisher of community newspapers in Oklahoma beginning at Chandler in 1918, he and wife Ayleene had owned newspapers in Marlow, Walters, Weatherford and Purcell. A joint partnership with Joe McBride of Anadarko, Nance McBride Newspapers, owned weekly and daily community newspapers in Tonkawa, Clinton, Hobart, Henryetta, Hominy, Mangum, Anadarko, Sulphur, Alva, Poteau and Antlers. The ownership group included a local operator partner in each community. Nance was also launched a newspaper with two partners publishing Plains Journal in Lubbock TX.

Nance continued to write weekly editorials for the Purcell Register on public policy matters until the week he died on September 3, 1984, at the age of 91 in his home at Purcell.

=== House of Representatives and State Senate 1920–1950; 1952–1962 ===
According to The Daily Oklahoman front-page story of September 4, 1984, Nance made his first move into Oklahoma politics winning election as State Representative from Stevens County in 1920 and served most of two terms and resigned in 1923 to seek an opportunity in Lubbock TX in a newspaper venture. Nance returned to the Oklahoma Legislature in 1927 again as a State Representative, but this time elected from Cotton County and served until 1932 when he won the Senate seat that included Cotton County. Nance later moved to Purcell in 1936, and was again elected State Representative from McClain County where he served one term before his 1938 election to the senate seat which included the larger area of Norman and Cleveland County, The University of Oklahoma and also Purcell and McClain county. Nance served 3 terms until 1950, and took a two-year break from political life. Nance was then elected in 1952 as State Representative for Purcell and McClain County and served for an additional decade.

=== Legislative leadership roles ===
In his public service career beginning in 1920 and lasting until 1962, Nance was twice elected Speaker of the Oklahoma House of Representatives, 1929 and 1953, and once President Pro Tem of the Oklahoma Senate in 1947–49.

=== U.S. Uniform Law Commissioner 1956–1980 ===
Nance was a recognized national policy leader in drafting uniform laws governing business transactions for the individual states. He served as Legislative Chairman of the U.S. Uniform Law Commission sponsored by the National Conference of Commissioners on Uniform State Laws. The NCCUSL is the influential non-partisan legislative consortium of commissioners from all 50 U.S. states and the U.S. territories. The group debates areas of public policy where uniform laws would benefit the states and drafts model legislation for consideration by the individual states. Most notably the NCCUSL drafted the landmark legislation Uniform Commercial Code (UCC) in conjunction with the American Law Institute.

=== Involvement in U.S. presidential elections in 1952 and 1956 ===
Nance was a 1952 delegate to the Democrat National Convention in Chicago IL as a supporter and convention floor organizer for fellow Oklahoman and political ally Robert S. Kerr. After Kerr withdrew from the race after the second convention ballot, Nance later supported U.S. Diplomat Averell Harriman, a late entry in the race. The 1952 Democrat National convention then nominated Illinois Governor Adlai Stevenson to face Republican party nominee, General Dwight Eisenhower, the eventual winner in the U.S. presidential election, 1952. Nance was a full-fledged supporter and convention floor organizer of Harriman 4 years later in the 1956 Democratic Party convention which became a rematch of Stevenson against Harriman, and Stevenson again winning the nomination and facing Eisenhower with the same results in the U.S. presidential election, 1956.

== Oklahoma Hall of Fame/Oklahoma Heritage Association ==
Back home in Oklahoma, Nance served as Master of Ceremonies for the Oklahoma Heritage Association's 1963 Oklahoma Hall of Fame awards ceremony which inducted U.S. astronaut Gordon Cooper, OU football coach Bud Wilkinson, Oklahoma publisher and investor W.P. Bill Atkinson, Ada Jurist Orel Busby, Tulsa Educator Ben G. Henneke, and Ardmore civic leader Mrs. Paul Sutton. Nance served on the Oklahoma Heritage Association's board of directors from 1979 to 1984. Previously, Nance was named to the Oklahoma Hall of Fame in 1953.

== Law background ==
Nance was a country lawyer joining the bar in Arkansas and later became member of the Oklahoma Bar Association. His legal education was attained as he served as legal articled clerk in a law office in Arkansas, and used his legal background in drafting legislation while serving in the legislature. Nance used his legal knowledge in business transactions, yet did not regularly practice law for the public. Nance had been a law clerk for his brother John Nance who later became Arkansas State Senate Majority Leader. While living in Marlow, OK Nance drafted and wrote the entire municipal charter for the City of Marlow and this led to legal consulting work on municipal charter revisions for other cities in Oklahoma.

Nance downplayed ideological labels, and as an experienced businessman favored lawsuit reform, and strongly advocated tax cuts whenever economically feasible. During the 1950s and early 1960s, Nance publicly supported civil rights leader Clara Luper in the Civil Rights Movement. In the mid-1960s, Nance editorialized against the Vietnam War, while advocating a strong national defense and military preparedness. He opposed "Right to Work" type labor legislation.

== Political alliances ==
In Oklahoma politics, Nance was a close ally of Gov. George Nigh in his campaigns from 1958 to 1982. Also, Nance's son-in-law, Ben Langdon served as senior advisor to Governor Nigh. In 1975, Nance was subpoenaed as a character witness in the federal corruption trial of former Oklahoma Governor David Hall during which Nance testified that pretrial daily newspaper coverage and media reports of the investigation prevented the defendant from receiving an impartial trial by an unbiased jury.

=== Civic engagement in retirement ===
In 1983 at age 89, Nance and Chief District Judge J. Kenneth Love were hosts for a non-partisan town hall meeting of area civic leaders and reception honoring Molly and David L. Boren, U.S. Senator. In 1984, Nance endorsed the re-election campaign of Boren in an editorial published a few weeks prior to his death in September. Nance had endorsed Boren in 1978 for U.S. Senate, and 1974 in the race for governor. In the 1984 Senate endorsement, Nance said "Boren has become the most popular leader in Oklahoma and will likely be sought out for national leadership."

In his retirement years, Nance was a regular commentator on OETA, the local PBS station, on its public affairs program panel Oklahoma Week in Review. Nance wrote regular weekly editorials on public policy matters in The Purcell Register. Nance mostly wrote non-partisan public policy articles and yet tended to favor Democrat candidates, and was a strong advocate of Social Security, Medicare, Medicaid, and funding for infrastructure projects including highways and county roads, bridges, schools, colleges, universities and other infrastructure. Over 2500 public policy editorials by Nance are at the Oklahoma History Center in Oklahoma City. Nance was a guest lecturer at the University of Oklahoma College of Law in retirement years.

== Personal life ==
Nance and his wife, Rosa Ayleene Carr Nance, were both Presbyterian and their 3 children were mostly raised in Walters, with prior residences in Chandler and Marlow: James C. Nance Jr. was born in Rogers AR, Mary Rosamond Nance McCurdy, and Bettye Nance Langdon were born in Chandler OK. The youngest child, Bettye, attended Purcell High School in her senior year. Nance had 6 grandchildren, 17 great grandchildren, and 1 great great grandchild. Other close family of Nance included nephew Robert J. McBrinn, Editor of the El Paso Herald-Post; niece Mary Frances Newbern of Fayetteville, AR; nephew David Newbern, Arkansas Supreme Court Justice; and niece Loretta Nance Pace, wife of District Judge Tom Pace of Norman, OK.

== Early life ==
Nance was born August 27, 1893, in the Rogers Arkansas area in unincorporated War Eagle, Arkansas near War Eagle Mill. Nance was named after James Paul Clarke who was then Governor of Arkansas. Nance enjoyed a typical 19th century rural farm life. His early years were spent raising farm animals and horses while working in the family apple orchard. He was a campaign manager at age 17 for U.S. Congressional candidate Claude A. Fuller of Arkansas. Nance often joked that Fuller lost that first campaign and later won the office with a different campaign manager. In a speech to the Norman Rotary Club as guest of Retired U.S. Army Lt. Col. Alfred "Joe" Cunningham in 1982, Nance said that when he was a teenager his horse got sick and he knew he had to act fast to sell it before it died. With the money he made from the horse sale, Nance moved into town. He then began buying and selling produce during the daytime and working as a law clerk in the night time for his older brother John Nance, a Rogers AR attorney, who later became Arkansas State Senate Majority Leader. The educational experience of the legal clerkship helped his legal business transactions, land title work and could recite from memory complex legal descriptions. Nance used this law background as a legislator, as an investor and business owner.

Nance's sister, Edna Nance Harding, was the wife of University of Arkansas President Arthur M. Harding. Dr. Harding was a well known professor of Mathematics and Astronomy and frequent lecturer on the Chautauqua speaking circuit.

Nance's son James C. Nance Jr. was born in Rogers Arkansas, and his birth certificate lists Nance's occupation as Produce Salesman. Daughters Rosamond and Bettye were born in Chandler, Oklahoma. Nance had an extensive book collection of over 500 books on law, philosophy, history, public policy and democracy in a private library cloakroom in his residence including published writings of John Locke, Thomas Paine, and Thomas Jefferson .

== Legacy ==
Nance received the Distinguished Service Citation from the University of Oklahoma in 1982. The resolution by the OU Regents commended Nance for his sponsorship of legislation authorizing the issuance of bonds for funding the construction of buildings and dormitories built at the campus of The University of Oklahoma which was located within his state senate legislative district (Cleveland, McClain, and Garvin counties).

Oklahoma Gov. George Nigh wrote and delivered the funeral eulogy for Memorial services held in Purcell for Nance, and Attorney General Mike Turpen read Nance's public policy career highlights on September 6, 1984, at the Presbyterian Church of Purcell, Oklahoma.

The Norman Transcript said in a Sept. 4 1984 article that Nance was an effective senator for the Norman and Purcell areas and particularly a strong supporter of The University of Oklahoma, during a time of rapid growth of The University of Oklahoma in the decade following World War II. The Transcript article stated that Nance led a successful statewide campaign to create an independent Board of Regents for The University of Oklahoma.

In 1994, Nance's granddaughter Nance Langdon Diamond of Shawnee became the first woman nominated by the Oklahoma Democratic party for the office of Lieutenant Governor of Oklahoma. In the general election, Diamond received 435,215 votes and finished second to Republican nominee Mary Fallin who had 481,539 votes. Diamond served in 2002 as volunteer transition advisor for Gov. Brad Henry. Ms. Diamond as a young child had sat on her grandfather's lap as he presided in the legislative chambers. In 1990, Diamond was the first woman to address a joint session of the Oklahoma Legislature as she spoke in favor of the 1990 Child Abuse Prevention Act, and providing services to disadvantaged, neglected and abused children.

=== US 77 James C. Nance Memorial Bridge linking Purcell, OK and Lexington, OK ===
The US 77 James C. Nance Memorial Bridge connecting Purcell and Lexington was originally built as a circa 1938 deck truss two-lane bridge and in 2019 rebuilt as a concrete pier four-lane bridge crossing the Canadian River between Purcell and Lexington, Oklahoma. The bridge carries U.S. Route 77 (US-77) and Oklahoma State Highway 39 (SH-39) from McClain County to Cleveland County. The Nance bridge allows travel time from Purcell (west side of the Canadian river) to Lexingon (East side of the river) to be only 3 minutes by car, according to google maps. When the bridge was closed (Emergency Closure, below), the same trip was 43 minutes when re-routed North to the nearest bridge, or 1 hour and 4 minutes when re-routed Southeast to the nearest bridge.

The 1938 construction of this bridge enabled communities from West and Southwest (Byars, Cole, Dibble, Paoli, Pauls Valley, Purcell, Rosedale, and Wayne) side of the river to reach the communities on the East side of the river (Lexington, Slaughterville, and Wanette). Traffic using the bridge allows trade and commerce to freely flow in this retail trade area of southern McClain County, southern Cleveland County, Southern Pottawatomie County, northern area of Garvin County, and the eastern portion of Grady county. The 2019 rebuilt bridge features the same design elements with concrete post and original circa 1938 design wrought iron railings which provide a separate pedestrian walkway offering sweeping views of the South Canadian River valley.

On July 1, 1968, civic leaders in Purcell and Lexington, led by banker and businessman Sam Ewing, requested the legislature pass House Joint Resolution 525, Okla. Session Laws 1967, pg. 709; 69 O.S. 1981, Section 1612 to enable the State Highway Commission name the Purcell/Lexington US-77/SH-39 bridge the James C. Nance Bridge, to honor his legislative service, as OK title 69, Chapter 1, Article 16 Section 1612 established the James C. Nance Bridge. In 1993 the bridge signage became James C. Nance Memorial Bridge in a move sponsored by Sen. Trish Weedn (D-Purcell), a friend of Nance.

According to the Oklahoma Department of Transportation, "History was made Friday July 26, 2019 in Purcell and Lexington, just as it was more than 80 years ago when the two cities celebrated the grand opening of a new bridge connecting their communities. The new US 77 Purcell/Lexington James C. Nance Bridge that links the twin cities, located less than one mile apart, fully opened to traffic with much fanfare on Friday, July 26, 2019, the culmination of a major two-year, expedited reconstruction project."

=== Norman Bridge ===
The Norman Transcript reported in a front-page article on September 4, 1984, that Nance, as Speaker of The Oklahoma House of Representatives left his mark in many places in the Norman-Purcell area and led the campaign to replace a dangerous, narrow bridge across the South Canadian River at Norman with the present multilane I-35 structure.

=== Nance-Boyer Hall at Cameron University ===
Nance-Boyer Hall at Cameron University in Lawton, Oklahoma, is named jointly for Nance and Mr. Dave Boyer, a former state Senator in Lawton; the action was announced by Cameron President John Coffey. In the earlier portion of Nance's political career, his legislative district was Cotton and Stephens counties.

=== Jim and Ayleene Nance Park ===
A small park area 1.5-acre (6,100 m^{2}) of central city greenbelt area of Walnut Creek in Purcell was named Jim and Ayleene Nance Park in 2000. The greenspace park fronts 7th street, 8th Street and Jefferson Street and was purchased and donated to the City of Purcell by family members of Jim and Ayleene Nance's three children: James C. Nance Jr., Rosamond Nance McCurdy and Betty Nance Langdon.

== Oklahoma Journalism Hall of Fame ==
In 1982, Nance was honored by the Oklahoma Press Association and named to the Oklahoma Journalism Hall of Fame. Nance had previously served on the Oklahoma Press Association Board of Directors.

== Native American Service Award from Chickasaw Nation ==
In April 1982, Nance was honored by Governor Overton James and Lt. Governor Bill Anoatubby of The Chickasaw Nation of Oklahoma. James was Chairman of the Inter-Tribal Council of The Five Civilized Tribes. The event held at Purcell High School auditorium honored Nance for his years of community service and service to Native Americans in the United States. Nance's wife Ayleene was a registered member of The Choctaw Nation of Oklahoma and had unregistered ancestors in The Chickasaw Nation of Oklahoma. Mrs.Nance was an enthusiast of Native American art, culture and heritage of indigenous peoples of the Americas. Mrs. Nance wrote a biographical article about growing up in the historic James E. Reynolds House in LeFlore County with her great-great grandparents Captain James Reynolds and wife Felicity Turnbull Reynolds, who was a Native American. The article on the pioneer residents of Indian Territory /Eastern Oklahoma community of Cameron, was published in The Chronicles of Oklahoma by The Oklahoma Historical Society.

== Sources ==
Oklahoma Journalism Hall of Fame

Directory of Oklahoma, Oklahoma State Election Board

Daily Oklahoman, September 1984 news article

Daily Oklahoman, September 1981 news article

James C. Nance, Newspaperman and Lawmaker Norman Transcript Newspaper 3-07-05

Story of Oklahoma Newspapers authored by Ed Carter Published by Oklahoma Press Association

When Both Sides Worked Together Norman Transcript Newspaper 2-27-05

Oklahoma Historical Society

The Chronicles of Oklahoma

Nance Speech to Norman Rotary Club, Oct. 1982 Norman Transcript

Oklahoma Statues Citationized 1968 Title 69. Roads, bridges Chapter 1, Art. 16, Sec. 1612 James C. Nance Bridge

Cameron University www.cameron.edu/info/campus_map/buildings/nance_boyer

Oklahoma Heritage Association

The Purcell Register newspaper www.purcellregister.com

ODOT, Oklahoma Department of Transportation Bridge across the Canadian River between Purcell and 1967 Lexington - “The James C. Nance Bridge”. H. J. R. 525, Okla. Session Laws 1967, pg. 709; 69 O.S. 1981, Sec. 1612.

https://oklahoma.gov/odot/citizen/newsroom/2019/july/history-repeats-as-new-purcell-lexington-bridge-opens-for-thene.html History repeats itself with new US 77 James C. Nance Memorial Bridge linking Purcell and Lexington
