= Eddie Griffin (coach) =

Biographical details
- Education: University of Central Oklahoma (MEd)

Playing career
- 1967–1972: Oklahoma State

Coaching career (HC unless noted)
- 1972–1976: Ardmore HS (OK)
- 1976–1978: Del City HS (OK)
- 1978–1982: Central State (OK)
- 1983–1991: Clemson

Administrative career (AD unless noted)
- 2000–2008: Northeastern State
- 2017–2020: Central Oklahoma

Accomplishments and honors

Championships
- 3 NAIA (1979, 1981, 1982); 1 ACC (1991)

Awards
- 3 NAIA National coach of the year (1979, 1981, 1982); Co–ACC coach of the year (1991)

Eddie Griffin is a former American collegiate athletic director and collegiate wrestling coach. He served as the athletic director at the University of Central Oklahoma in Edmond, Oklahoma from 2017 to 2020. Prior to this Griffin served as the athletic director at Northeastern State University in Tahlequah, Oklahoma, and the head wrestling coach at Central Oklahoma, and Clemson University.

== Early life ==
Griffin attended U.S. Grant High School in Oklahoma City. He studied at Oklahoma State University in Stillwater, Oklahoma from 1967 to 1972 and was a member of the Cowboy wrestling squad. During his time in Stillwater OSU won two NCAA wrestling team championships in 1968 and 1971. After graduation, Griffin began his coaching career at Ardmore High School, then moved to coach at Del City High School. His final season of coaching the Eagles he coached freshman standout and future wrestling legend John Smith to third place in the state tournament.

== Central Oklahoma ==
In 1978 Griffin became the head coach at Central State University (UCO). During his four years in Edmond his Bronchos won three NAIA national championships in 1979, 1981, and 1982. He also notably defeated several NCAA Division I programs. While coaching at UCO, his teams produced 26 All-Americans and 11 individual national champions. He decided to resign from CSU after the 1982 season.

== Clemson ==
After a year removed from coaching Griffin accepted the head coaching position at Clemson University in Clemson, South Carolina. He led the Tigers from the 1983–1984 season until 1991. His Tigers finished second in the ACC his first season. Clemson remained nationally ranked for several seasons under Griffin's tenure. In 1991, the Tigers won their first ACC regular season championship, and the conference named Griffin co-ACC coach of the year. He retired after the 1991 season.

== Post-Clemson coaching ==
From 1992 to 2000 Griffin served as the athletic director for Oklahoma City Public Schools. He then became the athletic director at Northeastern State University in Tahlequah, Oklahoma. During his tenure Northeastern State won the 2003 NCAA Division II Men's Basketball Championship. Also, Northeastern State changed their mascot from the Redmen to the RiverHawks in a proactive move to avoid possible sanctions from the NCAA Native American mascot decision. In 2008, Griffin resigned as athletic director and became the executive director of the Jim Thorpe Association.

Effective October 1, 2008, Griffin stepped down from his post NSU to become the executive vice president and chief executive officer of the Jim Thorpe Association and Oklahoma Hall of Fame. He held this position until October 1, 2017, when he received an opportunity to return to UCO.

== Return to UCO ==
In October 2017, Griffin returned to Central Oklahoma as the school's athletic director, under University President Don Betz, who also worked with Griffin while Betz was president of Northeastern State. Griffin retired on April 30, 2020.
