= Charles W. Wantland =

American athlete and coach (1888–1964)

Charles Wantland
Biographical details
- Born: February 22, 1888; Purcell, Oklahoma, U.S.
- Died: March 31, 1964 (aged 76); Oklahoma City, Oklahoma, U.S.

Playing career

Football
- 1907–1908: Oklahoma

Basketball
- 1907–1910: Oklahoma
- Position: Halfback

Coaching career (HC unless noted)

Football
- 1910: Lindsay HS (OK)
- 1911: Oklahoma (assistant)
- 1912–1919: Central State Normal / Teachers
- 1921–1930: Central State Teachers

Basketball
- 1921–1928: Central State Teachers

Track
- 1912: Oklahoma

Administrative career (AD unless noted)
- 1912–1931: Central State Normal/Teachers

Head coaching record
- Overall: 102–42–16 (college football); 36–57(college basketball)

Accomplishments and honors

Championships
- Football; 6 OIC (1914–1915, 1921, 1923–1924, 1929)

Charles William Wantland (February 22, 1888 – March 31, 1964) was an American athlete and coach. Wantland served as a sports coach and athletic director, and dean at Central State Teachers College in Edmond, Oklahoma.

== Early life and education ==
Wantland grew up in Purcell, Oklahoma. He attended Purcell High School and graduated in 1906. He attended the University of Oklahoma where Wantland participated on the football, baseball, track, and basketball teams. In football, he played right halfback, was the kick returner and placekicker. He is perhaps best known for the 1908 game against Texas in which he returned a kick for 90 yards and a touchdown, part of a four touchdown performance to defeat the Longhorns. During the 1909–10 season he was the captain of the Oklahoma Sooners men's basketball team.

== Coaching career ==
=== Early positions ===
After graduation from Oklahoma in 1910 with a B.A in economics, Wantland coached at Lindsay High School in 1910. After that year coach Bennie Owen tasked Wantland to be an assistant for the football team, and to coach the track squad. During this time Wantland was also a baseball umpire.

=== Central State ===
In 1912 Wantland was hired to lead the athletic program at Central State Normal School (later renamed Central State Teachers College, now the University of Central Oklahoma.) While at CSN he coached the football and basketball teams, and was also the dean of men at the college. It was during this time that he led Central into what would be known as the Golden Age of Central Football. He was instrumental in founding the first Oklahoma Intercollegiate Conference in which all normal schools in the state participated. He is known for defeating Oklahoma Methodist, (now Oklahoma City University) by a score of 183–0. During the 1924 season, Wantland had his greatest success, after a season opening loss to Southwestern (KS), he led the Bronchos to their only win over his alma mater the Oklahoma Sooners, shortly thereafter the Bronchos defeated eventual Southwest Conference champion Baylor in Dallas, on the way to a 9–1 record and the OIC crown.

=== Fired by Governor Murray ===
In 1930 former representative Alfalfa Bill Murray was campaigning to be governor. During this time he urged public officials to actively support his candidacy. However, college president John Gorden Mitchell and Wantland refused to do so. Wantland chose to support Murray's rival, Frank Buttram. Mitchell claimed Murray "was his third choice for governor". Murray responded that Mitchell was his second choice for the presidency of Central State. When Murray was successful in his gubernatorial bid he swiftly fired both President Mitchell and Wantland. Wantland never returned to the coaching ranks.

== Personal life ==
In 1922 Mrs. Wantland chose the Broncho as the mascot for CSTC. After being fired by Governor Murray, Wantland entered the oil supply business until his retirement in 1953. He died in 1964. Wantland was the namesake for two buildings on Central Oklahoma's campus, the former field house and current physical education building Wantland Hall, and the now Chad Richison Stadium the home for Broncho football was named Wantland Stadium in his honor from 1965–2021. In 1998 Wantland was named by the Purcell Register to the Purcell High School all-century team, the earliest player to make the list.

== Head coaching record ==
=== College football ===
Year	Team	Overall	Conference	Standing
Central State Normal (Independent) (1912–1913)
1912	Central State Normal	4–3		
1913	Central State Normal	3–3–3		
Central State Normal / Teachers (Oklahoma Intercollegiate Conference) (1914–1919)
1914	Central State Normal	5–1		1st
1915	Central State Normal	9–0		1st
1916	Central State Normal	8–3		
1917	Central State Normal	3–4		
1918	Central State Normal	6–2		
1919	Central State Teachers	6–5		
Central State Teachers Bronchos (Oklahoma Intercollegiate Conference) (1921–1928)
1921	Central State Teachers	8–1		1st
1922	Central State Teachers	7–4	5–3	5th
1923	Central State Teachers	7–1–1		1st
1924	Central State Teachers	9–1	7–0	1st
1925	Central State Teachers	4–3–2	4–1–1	3rd
1926	Central State Teachers	3–3–3	2–2–2	T–4th
1927	Central State Teachers	3–1–4	3–1–3	T–3rd
1928	Central State Teachers	5–3–1	3–2–1	T–5th
Central State Teachers Bronchos (Oklahoma Collegiate Athletic Conference) (1929–1930)
1929	Central State Teachers	6–1–2	5–0	1st
1930	Central State Teachers	6–3	4–1	2nd
Central State Normal / Teachers:		102–42–16		
Total:		102–42–16		
National championship Conference title Conference division title or championship game berth

=== College basketball ===
Record table
Season	Team	Overall	Conference	Standing	Postseason
Central State Teachers Bronchos (Oklahoma Intercollegiate Conference) (1921–1928)
1921–22	Central State Teachers	10–4			
1922–23	Central State Teachers	5–5			
1923–24	Central State Teachers	2–12			
1924–25	Central State Teachers	8–12			
1925–26	Central State Teachers	5–6			
1926–27	Central State Teachers	2–10			
1926–27	Central State Teachers	4–8			
Central State Teachers:		36–57 (.387)			
Total:		27–16 (.628)			
National champion Postseason invitational champion Conference regular season champion Conference regular season and conference tournament champion Division regular season champion Division regular season and conference tournament champion Conference tournament champion

== See also ==
- William C. Wantland, Wantland's grandson
- Moore-Lindsay House
