= Lexington, Oklahoma =

City in Oklahoma, US

- City
- Location of Lexington in Oklahoma
- Coordinates: 35°01′04″N 97°20′05″W
- Country: United States
- State: Oklahoma
- County: Cleveland

Area
  - Total: 2.48 sq mi (6.43 km^{2})
  - Land: 2.41 sq mi (6.24 km^{2})
  - Water: 0.073 sq mi (0.19 km^{2})
- Elevation: 1,034 ft (315 m)

Population (2020)
  - Total: 2,010
  - Density: 833.7/sq mi (321.91/km^{2})
- Time zone: UTC-6 (Central (CST))
  - Summer (DST): UTC-5 (CDT)
- ZIP code: 73051
- Area codes: 405/572
- FIPS code: 40-42700
- GNIS feature ID: 2410830
- Website: cityoflexington.com

Lexington is a city in Cleveland County, Oklahoma, United States. The city population was 2,010 at the 2020 census, a 6.6% decrease from 2010.

== Geography ==
Lexington is located in southern Cleveland County. It is bordered on the west by the Canadian River, which forms the McClain County line. The city of Purcell is directly across the river from Lexington, connected by U.S. Route 77. US 77 leads north from Lexington 16 miles (26 km) to Norman and 38 miles (61 km) to the center of Oklahoma City.

According to the United States Census Bureau, Lexington has a total area of 2.4 square miles (6.2 km^{2}), all land.

== Demographics ==
Historical population
| Census | Pop. | Note | %± |
|---|---|---|---|
| 1890 | 223 | | — |
| 1900 | 861 | | 286.1% |
| 1910 | 768 | | −10.8% |
| 1920 | 950 | | 23.7% |
| 1930 | 836 | | −12.0% |
| 1940 | 1,084 | | 29.7% |
| 1950 | 1,176 | | 8.5% |
| 1960 | 1,216 | | 3.4% |
| 1970 | 1,516 | | 24.7% |
| 1980 | 1,731 | | 14.2% |
| 1990 | 1,776 | | 2.6% |
| 2000 | 2,086 | | 17.5% |
| 2010 | 2,152 | | 3.2% |
| 2020 | 2,010 | | −6.6% |
U.S. Decennial Census

=== 2020 census ===
As of the 2020 census, Lexington had a population of 2,010. The median age was 38.9 years. 25.0% of residents were under the age of 18 and 18.5% of residents were 65 years of age or older. For every 100 females there were 93.1 males, and for every 100 females age 18 and over there were 89.3 males age 18 and over.

94.9% of residents lived in urban areas, while 5.1% lived in rural areas.

There were 713 households in Lexington, of which 35.5% had children under the age of 18 living in them. Of all households, 46.8% were married-couple households, 18.0% were households with a male householder and no spouse or partner present, and 30.4% were households with a female householder and no spouse or partner present. About 28.4% of all households were made up of individuals and 13.0% had someone living alone who was 65 years of age or older.

There were 846 housing units, of which 15.7% were vacant. Among occupied housing units, 64.8% were owner-occupied and 35.2% were renter-occupied. The homeowner vacancy rate was 5.5% and the rental vacancy rate was 12.0%.

Racial composition as of the 2020 census
| Race | Percent |
|---|---|
| White | 67.9% |
| Black or African American | 1.5% |
| American Indian and Alaska Native | 6.6% |
| Asian | 0.1% |
| Native Hawaiian and Other Pacific Islander | <0.1% |
| Some other race | 11.0% |
| Two or more races | 12.7% |
| Hispanic or Latino (of any race) | 18.8% |

=== 2010 census ===
As of the 2010 census there were 2,152 people, 761 households, and 541 families residing in the city. The population density was 979.3 people per square mile (378.1/km^{2}). There were 842 housing units at an average density of 395.3 per square mile (152.6/km^{2}). The racial makeup of the city was 85.62% White, 0.58% African American, 6.47% Native American, 0.10% Asian, 3.74% from other races, and 3.50% from two or more races. Hispanic or Latino of any race were 7.29% of the population.

There were 761 households, out of which 36.9% had children under the age of 18 living with them, 53.5% were married couples living together, 13.5% had a female householder with no husband present, and 28.8% were non-families. 25.5% of all households were made up of individuals, and 10.9% had someone living alone who was 65 years of age or older. The average household size was 2.60 and the average family size was 3.06.

In the city, the population was spread out, with 26.8% under the age of 18, 9.4% from 18 to 24, 27.5% from 25 to 44, 19.6% from 45 to 64, and 16.7% who were 65 years of age or older. The median age was 35 years. For every 100 females there were 96.1 males. For every 100 females age 18 and over, there were 86.4 males.

The median income for a household in the city was $27,538, and the median income for a family was $32,155. Males had a median income of $27,292 versus $20,000 for females. The per capita income for the city was $13,322. About 13.1% of families and 15.5% of the population were below the poverty line, including 18.6% of those under age 18 and 15.8% of those age 65 or over.

== History ==
In 1835, north of the present town, Major Richard B. Mason established Camp Holmes. Here, the Five Civilized Tribes, many of the Plains Indians and the Osage Nation met and signed the treaty of Camp Holmes, pledging peace and friendship among themselves and the United States. Later, Auguste P. Chouteau established a trading post here and renamed the place Camp Mason. Jesse Chisholm operated a store here.

The area of Lexington was in the Unassigned Lands, and the town was planned before the Land Rush of 1889. The town was named after Lexington, Kentucky. The post office was established in 1890.

The first incorporation of Lexington in 1890 was dissolved after political infighting and a dispute over high taxes on liquor sales. After a compromise was reached, the town reincorporated in 1892.

Before Oklahoma statehood in 1907, Lexington was known as a "whiskey town". Much of the business came from across the Canadian River from the thriving railroad town of Purcell which was located in dry Indian Territory. The Weitzenhoffer and Turk Distillery, the largest distillery in Oklahoma Territory, opened near Lexington in 1900 and operated until statewide prohibition in 1907.

During World War II, the Navy operated a gunnery school east of Lexington. After the war, the State of Oklahoma acquired the property and built an annex to Central State Mental Hospital (later Griffin Memorial Hospital). In 1971, the Department of Corrections acquired the property and opened a minimum security prison called the Regional Treatment Center. In 1976, the state began construction on the Lexington Assessment and Reception Center (LARC) which processes all new prisoners entering the state correctional system. The Regional Treatment Center was re-designated as the Joseph Harp Correctional Center, a medium-security prison.

== US 77 James C. Nance Bridge between Lexington and Purcell ==
The US 77 James C. Nance Memorial Bridge connecting Purcell and Lexington was originally built as a circa 1938 deck truss two-lane bridge, and in 2019, rebuilt as a concrete pier four-lane bridge crossing the Canadian River between Purcell and Lexington, Oklahoma. The bridge carries U.S. Route 77 (US-77) and Oklahoma State Highway 39 (SH-39) from McClain County to Cleveland County. The bridge is named for James C. Nance, longtime community newspaper chain publisher and Speaker of the Oklahoma House of Representatives, President pro tempore of the Oklahoma Senate and member of U.S Uniform Law Commission.

The Nance bridge allows travel time from Purcell (west side of the Canadian river) to Lexingon (East side of the river) to be only 3 minutes by car, according to google maps. When the bridge was closed (Emergency Closure, below), the same trip was 43 minutes when re-routed North to the nearest bridge, or 1 hour and 4 minutes when re-routed Southeast to the nearest bridge.

The 1938 construction of this bridge enabled communities from West and Southwest (Byars, Cole, Dibble, Paoli, Pauls Valley, Purcell, Rosedale, and Wayne) side of the river to reach the communities on the East side of the river (Lexington, Slaughterville, and Wanette). Traffic using the bridge allows trade and commerce to freely flow in this retail trade area of southern McClain County, southern Cleveland County, Southern Pottawatomie County, and northern area of Garvin County, and eastern portion of Grady county. The 2019 rebuilt bridge features the same design elements with concrete post and original circa 1938 design wrought iron railings which provide a separate pedestrian walkway offering sweeping views of the South Canadian River valley.

According to the Oklahoma Department of Transportation, "History was made Friday July 26, 2019 in Purcell and Lexington, just as it was more than 80 years ago when the two cities celebrated the grand opening of a new bridge connecting their communities. The new US 77 James C. Nance Memorial Bridge that links the twin cities, located less than one mile apart, fully opened to traffic with much fanfare on Friday, July 26, 2019, the culmination of a major two-year, expedited reconstruction project."

== Notable people ==
- Woody Crumbo (1912—1989), a 1978 Potawatomi Native American inductee into the Oklahoma Hall of Fame for his paintings.
- Harold Hamm (December 11, 1945 - ), oil baron was born and raised in Lexington, Oklahoma
- Cal Hobson (March 30, 1945 - ), former President Pro Tempore of the Oklahoma State Senate
- John Lucian Smith (December 26, 1914 – June 9, 1972), an American Medal of Honor recipient and Marine Corps flying ace, was born in Lexington.
