= SCCY CPX-1 =

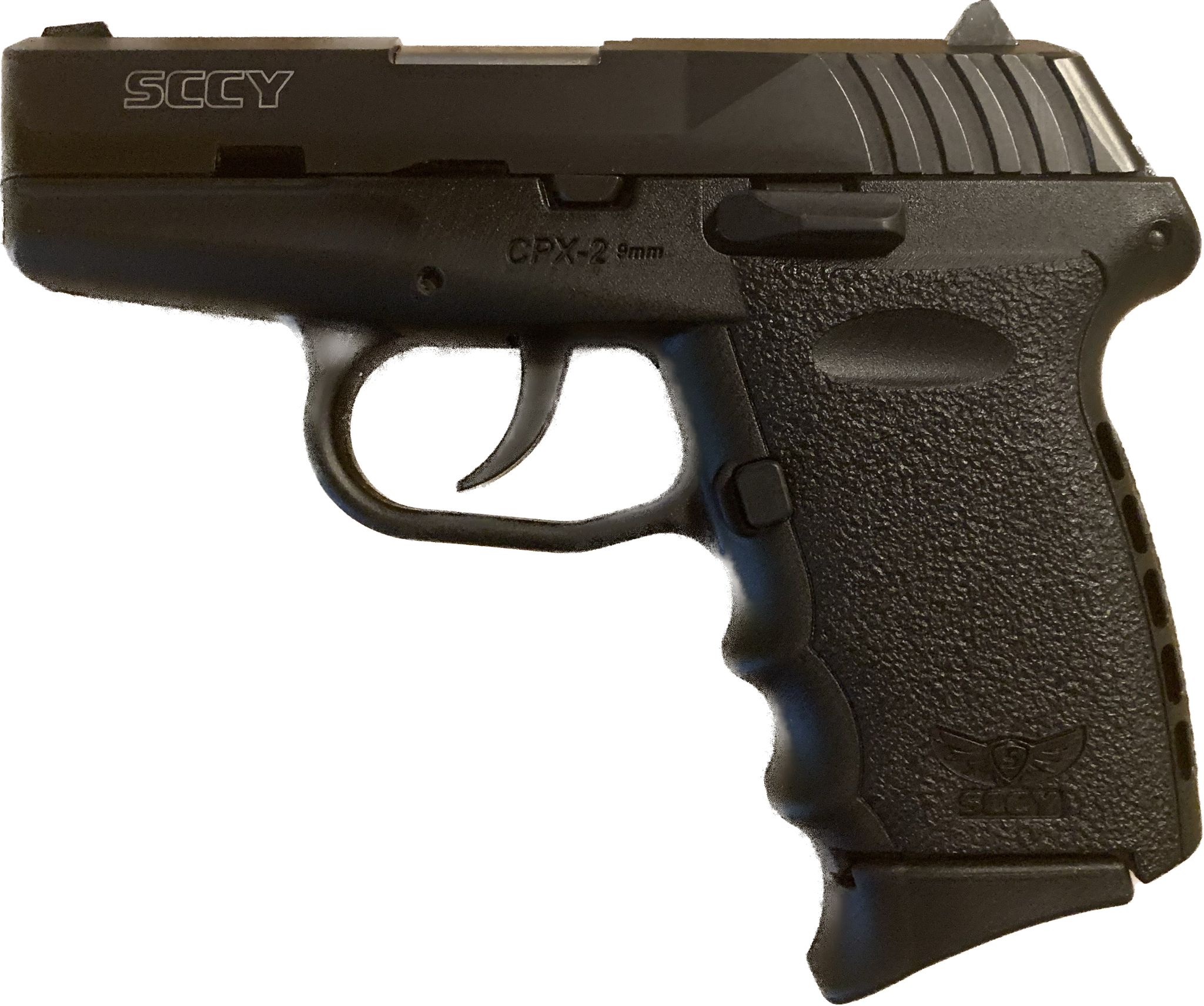
- Type: Semi-automatic pistol
- Place of origin: United States; Daytona Beach, FL

Production history
- Designer: Joseph Vincent Roebuck
- Manufacturer: SCCY Industries LLC
- Produced: 2005-2025
- Variants: CPX-2; CPX-3

Specifications
- Mass: 15 oz (430 g)
- Length: 5.7 inches (140 mm)
- Barrel length: 3.1 inches (79 mm)
- Width: 1 inch (25 mm)
- Height: 4 in
- Cartridge: 9×19mm Luger
- Action: Short recoil, locked breech
- Feed system: 10-round detachable box magazine
- Sights: Fixed; rear windage adjustable

The SCCY CPX-1 is a hammer-fired, polymer frame double action only (DAO) semiautomatic pistol chambered in 9×19mm Parabellum. The CPX-1 is a compact firearm that feeds from a staggered column, removable magazine. The pistol is manufactured by SCCY Industries, LLC in Daytona Beach, Florida.

== History and design ==
SCCY Industries was formed in 2003 by Joseph Vincent Roebuck. Originally, the company name was to be Skyy, but after trademark concerns regarding the use of the name by SKYY vodka, the name was changed to SCCY. Since 2010, the company manufactures all firearms in a factory in Daytona Beach, Florida. Prior to 2010, the guns were manufactured in South Daytona, Florida. All sales and marketing for the company is based in Acworth, Georgia, a northwest suburb of Atlanta.

The CPX-1 is a locked breech design that uses an aluminum receiver set inside the polymer grip housing and attached with steel pins. The CPX-1 uses a slide and barrel machined from 416 stainless steel. The CPX-1 is equipped with a slide stop and locks open when the last round is fired. The handgun has an ambidextrous manual safety that is frame mounted.

SCCY designed the pistol with an internal hammer and has a double action trigger pull.

All parts of the CPX-1 pistol, except for the springs, are manufactured in-house by SCCY. Slides are manufactured from heat treated hex steel. The company molds its own polymer frames and makes its own magazines.

Every SCCY CPX carries a perpetual lifetime warranty. The warranty is connected to the firearm, not the owner. If the gun is traded or sold to another owner, the warranty will still be honored by SCCY. In the past, the company also provided a new pistol to anyone who had a SCCY pistol taken as evidence in a justifiable use of force in self-defense. These replacements required a copy of the police report and other documentation.

SCCY will no longer replace a lost or stolen pistol.

== CPX Variants ==
The second variant, the CPX-2, eliminates the external manual safety that was featured on the CPX-1. The CPX-2 relies on the double action only (DAO) trigger pull, which requires 8.5 to 9 pounds of pressure, to help prevent unintentional discharge. A firing pin spring and low-mass hammer prevent discharge if the handgun is dropped. Both the CPX-1 and CPX-2 are chambered in 9×19mm Parabellum. The third variant released, the CPX-3, is like the CPX-2 where there is no external manual safety, though it is chambered in .380 ACP.
