= Southridge Addition Historic District =

Historic city district in Norman, OK

- Southridge Historic District
- U.S. National Register of Historic Places
- U.S. Historic district
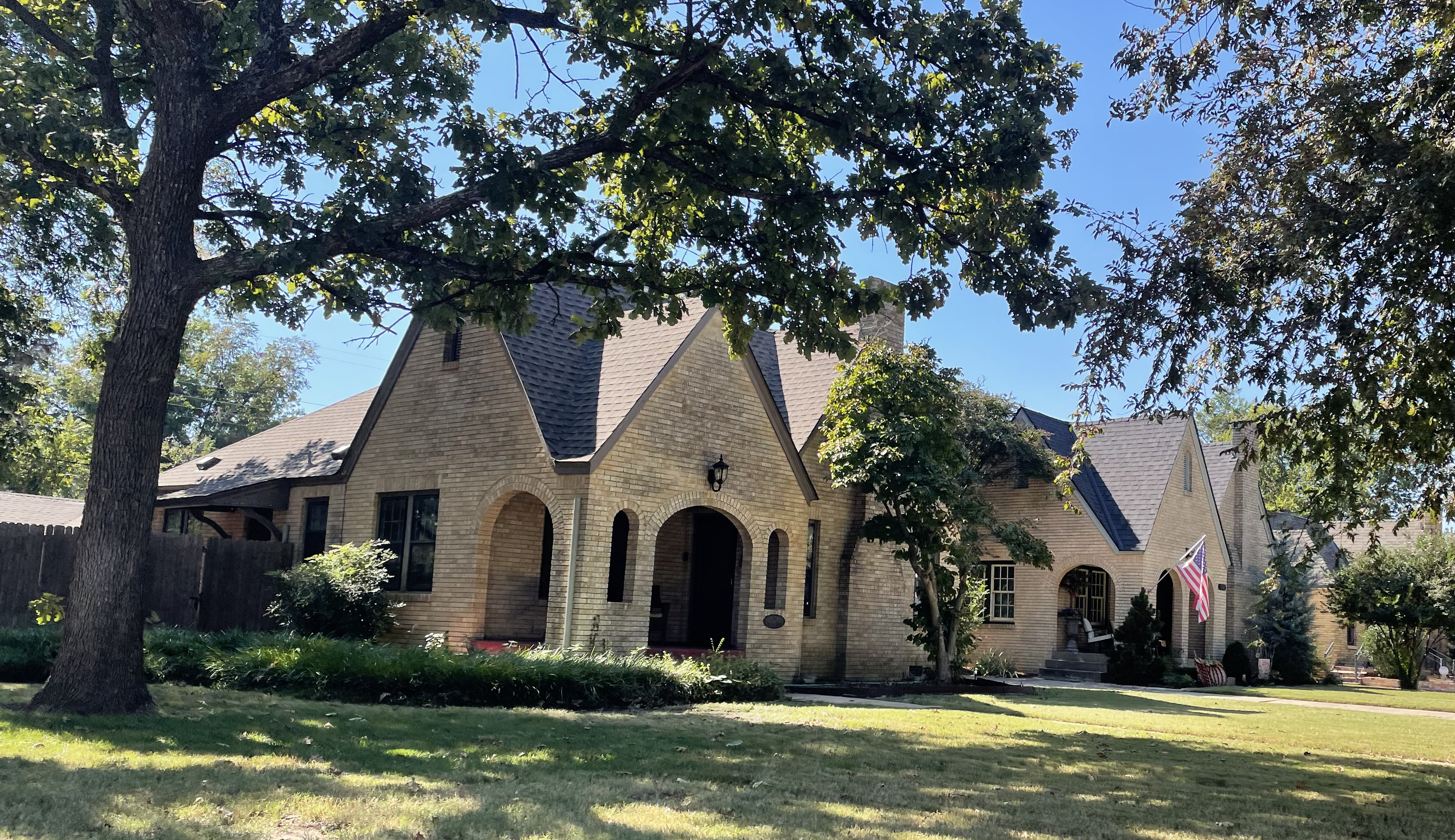
- An example of homes in the Southridge Historic District located in Norman, OK, USA.
- Location: Norman, Oklahoma
- Coordinates: 35°12′40″N 97°26′05″W
- Built: 1922 - 1959
- NRHP reference No.: 100002882
- Added to NRHP: 2018

The Southridge Historic District is located in Norman, Oklahoma.

The district encompasses an area roughly bounded by Macy Street, Shawnee Street, Classen Boulevard, and Oklahoma Avenue. It includes 225 structures as well as Earl Sneed Park. The dominant architectural styles are Tudor Revival, Colonial Revival, and Minimal Traditional. The Southridge Addition was platted in 1922 and significant construction occurred from 1923 until 1959.
