= Cleveland County, Oklahoma =

County in Oklahoma, United States

- County
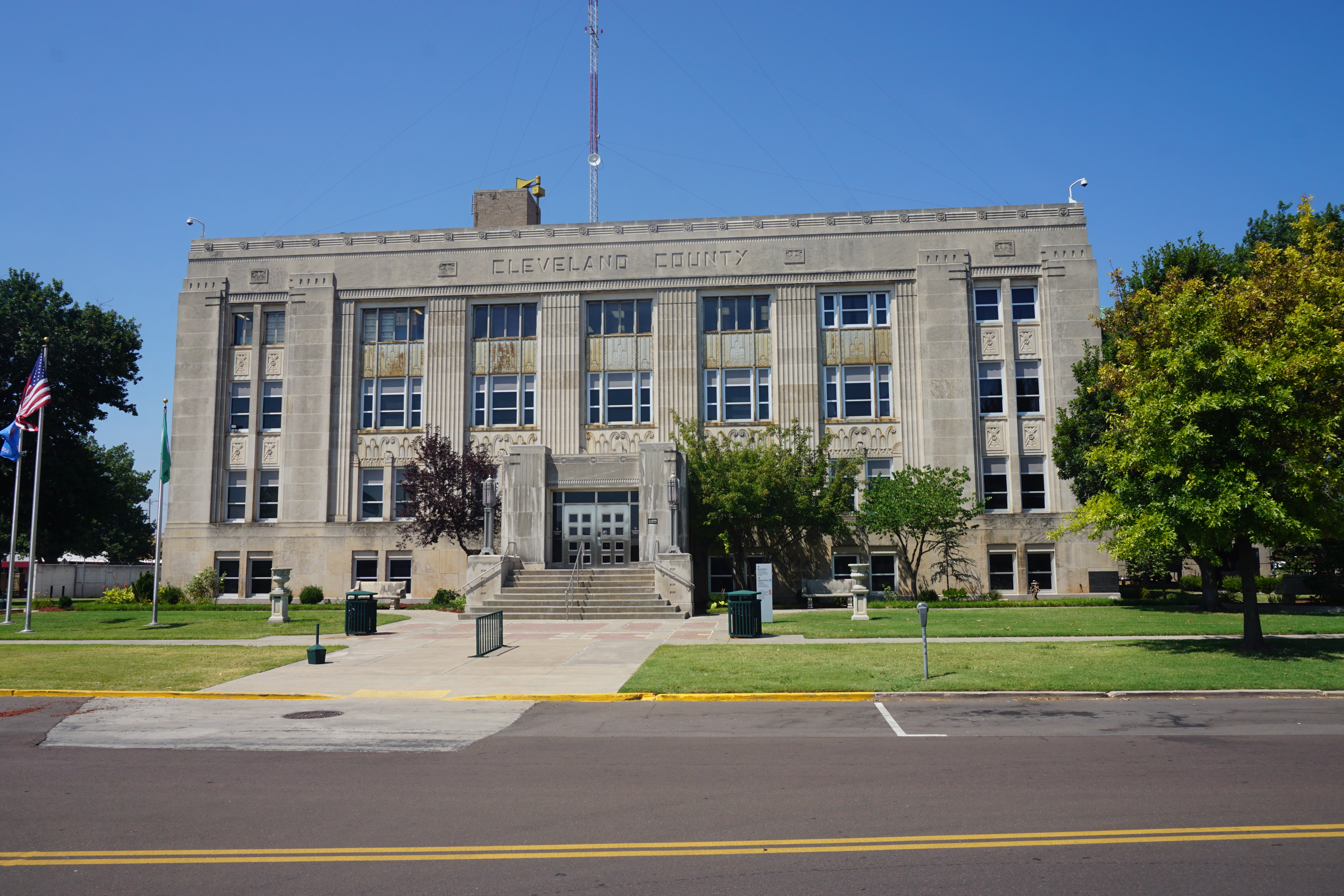
- Cleveland County Courthouse

- Location within the U.S. state of Oklahoma
- Coordinates: 35°12′N 97°20′W
- Country: United States
- State: Oklahoma
- Founded: 1890
- Named for: Grover Cleveland
- Seat: Norman
- Largest city: Norman

Area
  - Total: 558 sq mi (1,450 km^{2})
  - Land: 539 sq mi (1,400 km^{2})
  - Water: 19 sq mi (49 km^{2}) 3.5%

Population (2020)
  - Total: 295,528
  - Estimate (2025): 303,973 ▲
  - Density: 548/sq mi (212/km^{2})
- Time zone: UTC−6 (Central)
  - Summer (DST): UTC−5 (CDT)
- Congressional district: 4th
- Website: www.clevelandcountyok.com

Cleveland County is a county in the central part of the U.S. state of Oklahoma. The population was 295,528 at the 2020 United States census, making it the third-most populous county in Oklahoma. Its county seat is Norman. The county was named for U.S. President Grover Cleveland. Cleveland County is part of the Oklahoma City metropolitan statistical area.

== History ==
Originally occupied by the Quapaw tribe, the Quapaw ceded the area to the U.S. Government soon after the Louisiana Purchase in 1818. During the late 1820s and 1830s, the area was given to the Creek and Seminole tribes after their forced removal from the southeastern United States. An agreement between the two tribes resulted in this area being part of the Seminole Nation, located west of the Creek Nation.

In 1866, these tribes were forced to cede the area to the Federal Government; the professed rationale was their siding with the Confederacy during the American Civil War. The area became part of the Unassigned Lands and was opened for white settlement on April 22, 1889.

After the passage of the Organic Act in 1890, Cleveland County was organized as County 3 (of 7) and Norman became the county seat. For a short time, Cleveland County was known as Little River County, until an election in 1890. The voters selected the name Cleveland in honor of President Grover Cleveland over the name Lincoln.

== Geography ==
According to the U.S. Census Bureau, the county has a total area of 558 square miles (1,450 km^{2}), of which 539 square miles (1,400 km^{2}) is land and 19 square miles (49 km^{2}) (3.5%) is water. It is the eighth smallest county in the state.

Cleveland County contains the reservoir Lake Thunderbird 5,349 acres (21.65 km^{2}), constructed between 1962 and 1965. Its waters covered the previous settlement of Denver.

Cleveland County is the origin of the Little River, a tributary of the Canadian River, 90 miles (140 km) long. The Canadian River defines the southern border of Cleveland County.

=== Adjacent counties ===
- Oklahoma County − north
- Pottawatomie County − east
- McClain County − southwest
- Canadian County − northwest

== Demographics ==
Historical population
Census	Pop.	Note	%±
1890	6,605		—
1900	16,388		148.1%
1910	18,843		15.0%
1920	19,389		2.9%
1930	24,948		28.7%
1940	27,728		11.1%
1950	41,443		49.5%
1960	47,600		14.9%
1970	81,839		71.9%
1980	133,173		62.7%
1990	174,253		30.8%
2000	208,016		19.4%
2010	255,755		22.9%
2020	295,528		15.6%
2025 (est.)	303,973	▲	2.9%
US Decennial Census; 1790-1960 1900-1990; 1990-2000 2010-2019

=== 2020 census ===
As of the 2020 United States census, the county had a population of 295,528. Of the residents, 22.6% were under the age of 18 and 14.2% were 65 years of age or older; the median age was 34.8 years. For every 100 females there were 98.4 males, and for every 100 females age 18 and over there were 96.3 males.

The racial makeup of the county was 68.9% White, 5.1% Black or African American, 4.5% American Indian and Alaska Native, 4.3% Asian, 4.0% from some other race, and 13.1% from two or more races. Hispanic or Latino residents of any race comprised 10.3% of the population.

There were 112,649 households in the county, of which 31.7% had children under the age of 18 living with them and 26.6% had a female householder with no spouse or partner present. About 27.2% of all households were made up of individuals and 9.3% had someone living alone who was 65 years of age or older.

There were 121,539 housing units, of which 7.3% were vacant. Among occupied housing units, 62.7% were owner-occupied and 37.3% were renter-occupied. The homeowner vacancy rate was 1.6% and the rental vacancy rate was 9.5%.

=== 2010 census ===
As of the 2010 United States census, there were 255,755 people, 98,306 households, and 64,182 families in the county. The population density was 458 inhabitants per square mile (177/km^{2}). There were 104,821 housing units at an average density of 188 units per square mile (73 units/km^{2}). The racial makeup of the county was 79.3% white, 4.2% black or African American, 4.7% Native American, 3.8% Asian, 0.1% Pacific Islander, 2.3% from other races, and 5.6% from two or more races. 7.0% of the population were Hispanic or Latino of any race.

As of 2010, were 98,306 households, of which almost half (49.9%) included married couples living together and more than a third (34.7%) were non-families. Almost a third (32.9%) included children under the age of 18, 10.7% had a female householder with no husband present, and 4.7% had a male householder with no wife present. More than a fourth (25.9%) of households consisted of a sole individual and 6.9% were individuals 65 years of age or older living alone. The average household size was 2.49 and the average family size was 3.02.

As of 2010, the county population contained 23.1% under the age of 18, 14.2% from 18 to 24, 28.1% from 25 to 44, 24.4% from 45 to 64, and 10.2% who were 65 years of age or older. The median age was 32.7 years. For every 100 females, there were 99.9 males. For every 100 females age 18 and over, there were 98.1 males.

As of 2010, the median income for a household in the county was $53,759, and the median income for a family was $67,412. Males had a median income of $45,580 versus $34,801 for females. The per capita income for the county was $26,640. About 7.2% of families and 12.1% of the population were below the poverty line, including 12.7% of those under age 18 and 5.8% of those age 65 or over.

=== Recent estimates ===
According to the Census Bureau, the county's population was estimated at 299,587 in 2022. The same 2021 census estimates placed the racial makeup at 69.5% non-Hispanic white, 5.7% African American, 5.6% Native American, 4.7% Asian, 0.1% Pacific Islander, 6.3% multiracial, and 9.9% Hispanic or Latino of any race, and reported a median household income of $67,068 with a poverty rate of 12.3%.

== Politics ==
Cleveland County is rather conservative for a county influenced by a college town. While most such counties swung heavily to the Democrats in the 1990s, Cleveland County has gone Republican in all but one presidential election since 1952, and last went Democratic for president in 1964. However, the county leans much less Republican than the state as a whole; in 2020, Joe Biden became the first Democrat to win more than 40% of the county's vote since Jimmy Carter in 1976, only losing the county by 14 percentage points, compared to a 33-point loss statewide.

The county backed Democratic candidate Joy Hofmeister with nearly 52% of the vote in the 2022 gubernatorial election.

Voter registration and party enrollment as of May 31, 2023
Party	Number of voters	Percentage
Republican	84,250	47.18%
Democratic	52,617	29.46%
Unaffiliated	39,670	22.21%
Libertarian	2,047	1.15%
Total	178,584	100%

United States presidential election results for Cleveland County, Oklahoma
Year	Republican		Democratic		Third party(ies)	
Year	No.	%	No.	%	No.	%
1908	1,092	36.33%	1,437	47.80%	477	15.87%
1912	938	32.74%	1,471	51.34%	456	15.92%
1916	885	27.36%	1,753	54.19%	597	18.45%
1920	2,283	45.80%	2,397	48.08%	305	6.12%
1924	1,672	33.39%	2,841	56.73%	495	9.88%
1928	3,738	61.35%	2,291	37.60%	64	1.05%
1932	1,868	23.84%	5,969	76.16%	0	0.00%
1936	2,643	29.30%	6,304	69.87%	75	0.83%
1940	3,660	37.93%	5,933	61.48%	57	0.59%
1944	3,642	40.91%	5,240	58.86%	21	0.24%
1948	3,671	35.90%	6,556	64.10%	0	0.00%
1952	8,149	56.83%	6,190	43.17%	0	0.00%
1956	7,766	56.47%	5,987	43.53%	0	0.00%
1960	9,292	59.23%	6,397	40.77%	0	0.00%
1964	9,656	45.43%	11,599	54.57%	0	0.00%
1968	12,446	48.29%	8,617	33.43%	4,711	18.28%
1972	25,777	68.71%	11,126	29.66%	615	1.64%
1976	22,098	51.06%	20,054	46.33%	1,129	2.61%
1980	31,178	61.86%	14,536	28.84%	4,687	9.30%
1984	42,806	71.70%	16,512	27.66%	387	0.65%
1988	36,313	61.62%	22,067	37.44%	553	0.94%
1992	35,561	44.10%	24,404	30.27%	20,664	25.63%
1996	36,457	52.24%	26,038	37.31%	7,288	10.44%
2000	47,393	62.22%	27,792	36.49%	986	1.29%
2004	65,720	65.90%	34,007	34.10%	0	0.00%
2008	64,749	62.00%	39,681	38.00%	0	0.00%
2012	59,116	62.97%	34,771	37.03%	0	0.00%
2016	62,538	57.14%	38,829	35.48%	8,083	7.39%
2020	66,677	55.67%	49,827	41.60%	3,274	2.73%
2024	67,225	56.35%	49,432	41.44%	2,637	2.21%

== Education ==
The University of Oklahoma is located in Norman. It is the largest university in Oklahoma with approximately 30,000 students.

=== K-12 school districts ===
School districts include:

- Lexington Public Schools
- Little Axe Public Schools
- McLoud Public Schools
- Midwest City-Del City Schools
- Moore Public Schools
- Mustang Public Schools
- Noble Public Schools
- Norman Public Schools
- Robin Hill Public School (elementary only)

=== Libraries ===
Pioneer Library System operates branch libraries in ten cities in Cleveland, McClain and Pottawatomie counties.

== Transportation ==
=== Airports ===
The University of Oklahoma Westheimer Airport is owned by the University of Oklahoma. It is located 3 nautical miles (5.6 km) northwest of Norman.

=== Major highways ===
- Interstate 35
- Interstate 44 / U.S. Highway 62
- U.S. Highway 77
- State Highway 9
- State Highway 37
- State Highway 39
- State Highway 77H

== James C. Nance Memorial Bridge ==
The US 77 James C. Nance Memorial Bridge linking Lexington and Purcell was originally built as a circa 1938 deck truss two-lane bridge and in 2019 rebuilt as a concrete pier four-lane bridge crossing the Canadian River between Purcell and Lexington, Oklahoma. The bridge carries U.S. Route 77 (US-77) and Oklahoma State Highway 39 (SH-39) from McClain County to Cleveland County. The bridge is named for James C. Nance, longtime community newspaper chain publisher and Speaker of the Oklahoma House of Representatives, President Pro Tem of Oklahoma State Senate and Uniform Law Commissioner.

The Nance bridge allows travel time from Purcell (west side of the Canadian River) to Lexington (east side of the river) to be only three minutes by car, according to google maps. When the bridge was closed for emergency repairs, the same trip was 43 minutes when rerouted north to the nearest bridge, or one hour, four minutes when rerouted southeast to the nearest bridge.

The 1938 construction of this bridge enabled communities from West and Southwest (Byars, Cole, Dibble, Paoli, Pauls Valley, Purcell, Rosedale, and Wayne) side of the river to reach the communities on the East side of the river (Lexington, Slaughterville, and Wanette). Traffic using the bridge allows trade and commerce to freely flow in this retail trade area of southern McClain County, southern Cleveland County, Southern Pottawatomie County, and northern areas of Garvin County, and the eastern portion of Grady County. The bridge, rebuilt in 2019, features the same design elements with concrete post and wrought iron railings with protected turn lane and sidewalks.

According to the Oklahoma Department of Transportation, "History was made Friday July 26, 2019 in Purcell and Lexington, just as it was more than 80 years ago when the two cities celebrated the grand opening of a new bridge connecting their communities. The new US 77 Purcell/Lexington James C. Nance Bridge that links the twin cities, located less than one mile apart, fully opened to traffic with much fanfare on Friday, July 26, 2019, the culmination of a major two-year, expedited reconstruction project."

== Communities ==
=== Cities ===
- Lexington
- Moore
- Noble
- Norman (county seat)
- Oklahoma City (mostly in Oklahoma County)
- Purcell (mostly in McClain County)

=== Towns ===
- Etowah
- Slaughterville

=== Former town ===
- Hall Park (annexed into Norman by 2003)

== NRHP sites ==
The following sites in Cleveland County are listed on the National Register of Historic Places:

- Bavinger House, Norman
- Beta Theta Pi Fraternity House, Norman
- Bizzell Library, Norman
- Casa Blanca, Norman
- Cleveland County Courthouse, Norman
- DeBarr Historic District, Norman
- Patricio Gimeno House, Norman
- Oscar B. Jacobson House, Norman
- Ledbetter House, Norman
- Mardock Mission, Stella
- Moore Public School Building, Moore
- Moore-Lindsay House, Norman
- Norman City Park New Deal Resources, Norman
- Norman Historic District, Norman
- Norman Public Library, Norman
- Boyd House (University of Oklahoma), Norman
- Santa Fe Depot, Norman
- Sooner Theater Building,
- United States Post Office--Norman, Norman
- James C. Nance Bridge, Lexington/Purcell

== See also ==
- List of tornadoes in Cleveland County, Oklahoma
