= United States Post Office (Norman, Oklahoma) =

- United States Post Office--Norman
- U.S. National Register of Historic Places
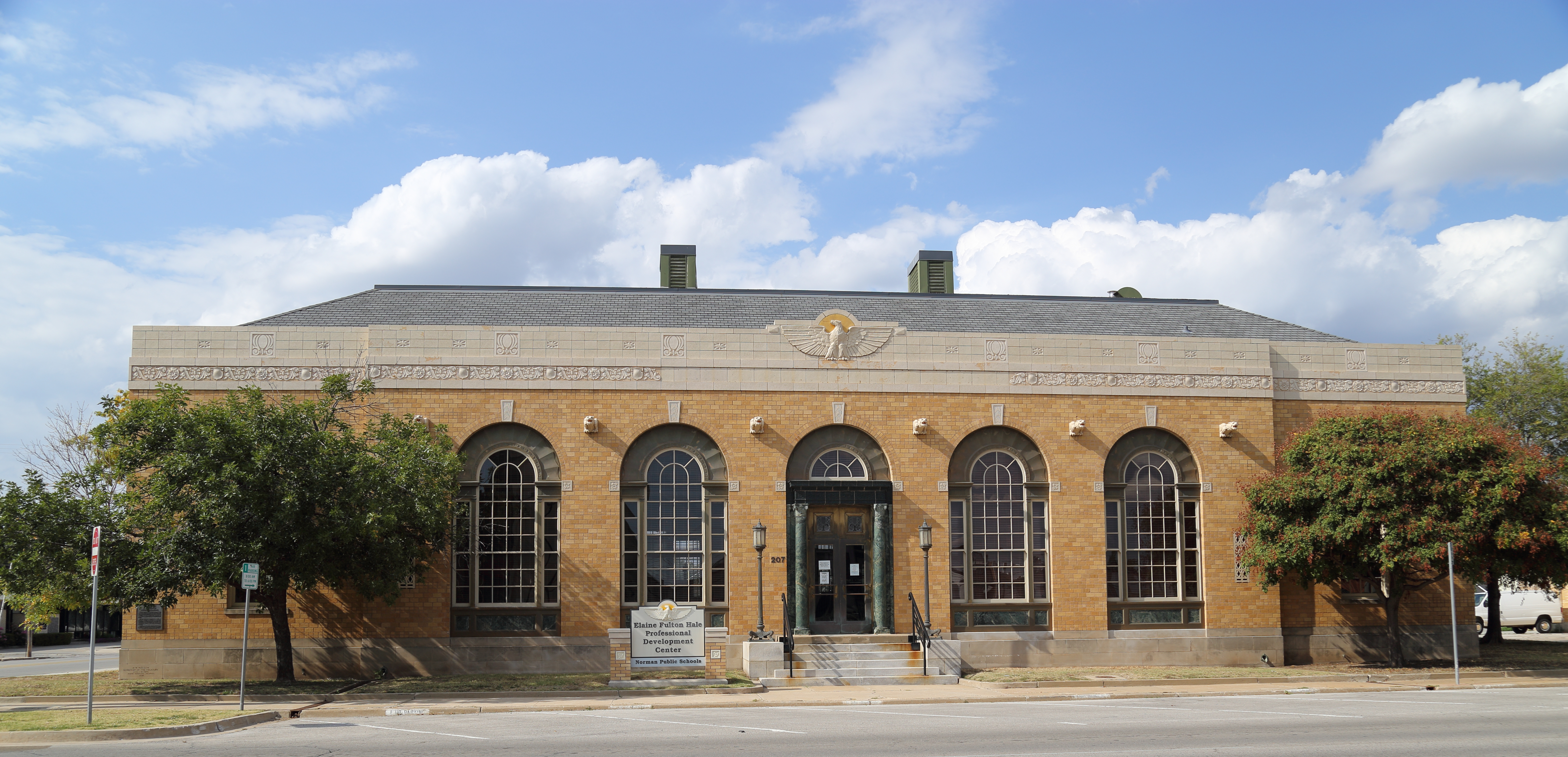

- Location within Oklahoma
- Location: 207 E. Gray St., Norman, Oklahoma
- Coordinates: 35°13′22″N 97°26′32″W
- Area: less than one acre
- Built: 1933
- Built by: Christy-Dolph Construction Co.
- Architect: James Wetmore
- Architectural style: Classical Revival
- NRHP reference No.: 00001573
- Added to NRHP: December 28, 2000

The United States Post Office in Norman, Oklahoma, at 207 E. Gray St., was built in 1933 in Classical Revival style. It was listed on the National Register of Historic Places in 2000 as United States Post Office—Norman.

It was deemed "an outstanding example of a federally designed Classical Revival style government building".

It later became the Norman Schools Professional Development Center.
