= Hotel Love =

Historic hotel in Purcell, Oklahoma, US

- U.S. National Register of Historic Places
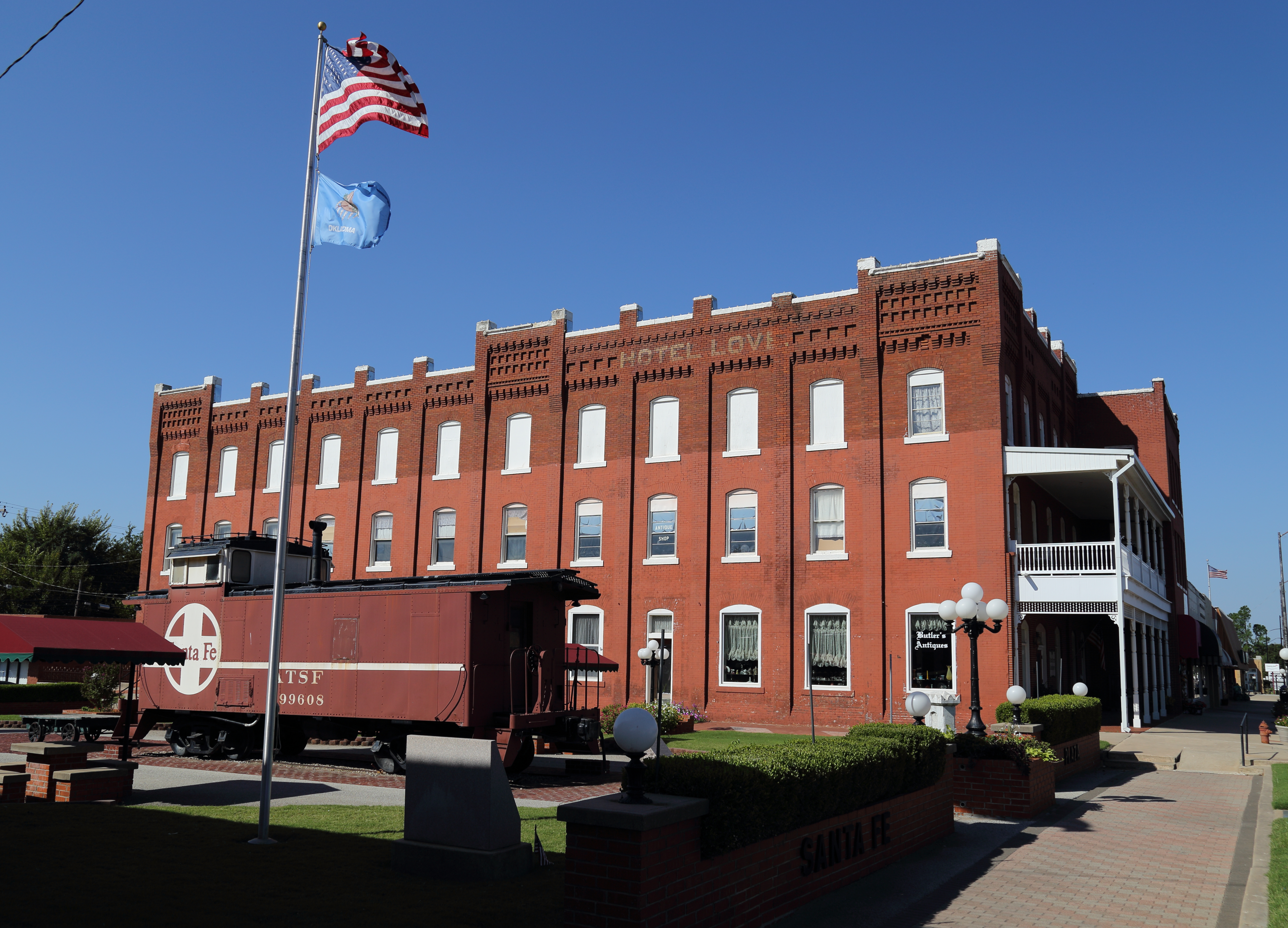

- Location within Oklahoma
- Location: 200 W. Main St., Purcell, Oklahoma
- Coordinates: 35°00′44″N 97°21′41″W
- Area: less than one acre
- Built: 1896
- Architectural style: Italianate
- NRHP reference No.: 95001407
- Added to NRHP: December 7, 1995

Hotel Love, at 200 W. Main St. in Purcell, Oklahoma, was built in 1896. It was listed on the National Register of Historic Places in 1995.

Constructed in the year 1896 and enlarged in 1909. The Oklahoma Historical Society's National Register handbook also lists it at 200 West Main in McClain County.

It has Italianate style.
