= Moore–Lindsay House =

Historic house in Oklahoma, United States

- U.S. National Register of Historic Places
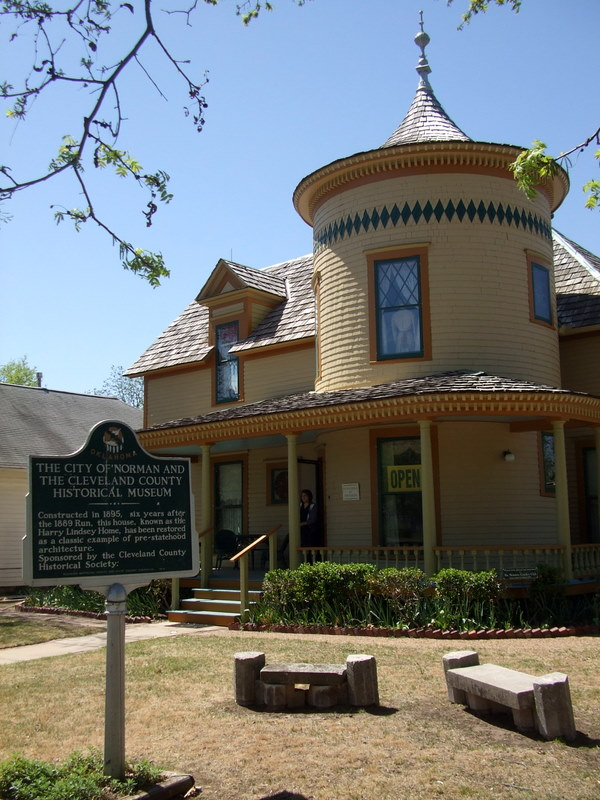

- Location within Oklahoma
- Location: 508 North Peters Ave., Norman, Oklahoma
- Coordinates: 35°13′31.5438″N 97°26′39.2856″W
- Built: 1899
- Architectural style: Vernacular Queen Anne Victorian
- NRHP reference No.: 85002788
- Added to NRHP: 14 November 1985

The Moore–Lindsay House is a Queen Anne style Victorian historic house located in Norman, Oklahoma. It is listed on the National Register of Historic Places, and now houses a museum.

== Description and history ==
The Moore–Lindsay House was built starting in 1899 by William and Agnes Moore. The couple spent $5,000 to build their 2,700-square-foot (250 m^{2}) "Princess Anne" style home, at a time when most new houses in the Oklahoma Territory were being built for about $400. The Moores, who had moved from St. Joseph, Missouri, invested in real estate and, in 1899, was named president of the Norman Building and Loan Association.

In 1907, the year in which the Oklahoma Territory became the state of Oklahoma, the Moores moved to Oklahoma City. They sold the home to Harry and Daisy Lindsay. Daisy Lindsay was a niece of the Moores. Harry Lindsay was president of the Norman Grain and Milling Company. He also served on the Norman City Council and the Norman School Board. Daisy Lindsay was active in the Woman's Christian Temperance Union, the Norman Garden Club, and the literary club - the Old Regime Club.

The Lindsay's had one child, Mary Agnes, who attended the University of Oklahoma and married Charles W. Wantland in 1911. Wantland played football under coach Bennie Owen, and after finishing his studies went on to be hired by Central State Normal School (now the University of Central Oklahoma) in Edmond, Oklahoma, to coach the school's football team. Wantland Stadium and Wantland Hall are both named for him.

The Lindsays remained in Norman, and Daisy Lindsay lived in the house until her death in 1951. After that time, the house was sold and divided into apartments.

== Museum ==
The house was purchased by the city of Norman in 1973 and renovated for use as a museum. The structure is owned by the city of Norman, while the museum within it is operated by the non-profit Cleveland County Historical Society (CCHS).

The Cleveland County Historical Society, which was formed in 1967, now operates the museum. The museum is open Tuesday through Saturday of each week, from 11 a.m. to 4 p.m. The historical society maintains a collection of some 5,000 rare books, photographs, and artifacts in an upstairs storage room within the museum. It is located at 508 N. Peters Ave., in Norman, Oklahoma.
