= National Register of Historic Places listings in Garvin County, Oklahoma =

Location of Garvin County in Oklahoma

This is a list of the National Register of Historic Places listings in Garvin County, Oklahoma.

This is intended to be a complete list of the properties and districts on the National Register of Historic Places in Garvin County, Oklahoma, United States. The locations of National Register properties and districts for which the latitude and longitude coordinates are included below, may be seen in a map.

There are 12 properties and districts listed on the National Register in the county.

This National Park Service list is complete through NPS recent listings posted March 14, 2025.

== Current listings ==
	Name on the Register	Image	Date listed	Location	City or town	Description
1	Antioch Dependent School District No. 15	Antioch Dependent School District No. 15	December 6, 2004 (#04001333)	0.5 miles west of the junction of Antioch Rd and State Highway 74; 34°43′30″N 97°24′42″W	Elmore City	
2	Beaty School		September 8, 2017 (#100001592)	Cty. Rd. 3210 at Royal Oaks Rd. 34°43′29″N 97°16′59″W	Pauls Valley vicinity	
3	Erin Springs Mansion	Erin Springs Mansion	June 22, 1970 (#70000534)	South of the Washita River; 34°48′30″N 97°36′16″W	Erin Springs	
4	Eskridge Hotel	Eskridge Hotel	October 3, 1979 (#79001994)	114 E. Robert S. Kerr St. 34°38′36″N 97°10′10″W	Wynnewood	
5	First National Bank Building	First National Bank Building	June 14, 2001 (#01000659)	100 W. Main; 34°47′44″N 96°57′44″W	Stratford	
6	Fort Arbuckle Site		June 13, 1972 (#72001064)	About 0.5 miles north of Hoover on State Highway 7; 34°31′39″N 97°15′00″W	Hoover	
7	Garvin County Courthouse	Garvin County Courthouse	November 8, 1985 (#85002758)	Courthouse Sq. and Grant Ave. 34°44′25″N 97°13′18″W	Pauls Valley	
8	Hargis-Mitchell-Cochran House	Hargis-Mitchell-Cochran House	June 2, 1982 (#82003684)	204 E. Robert S. Kerr St. 34°38′35″N 97°10′08″W	Wynnewood	
9	Initial Point		October 6, 1970 (#70000533)	About 7.5 miles west of Davis on the Garvin/Murray county line 34°30′24″N 97°14′49″W	Davis	Extends into Murray County
10	Moore-Settle House	Moore-Settle House	March 25, 1983 (#83002086)	508 E. Cherokee St. 34°38′34″N 97°09′50″W	Wynnewood	
11	Pauls Valley Historic District	Pauls Valley Historic District	February 1, 1979 (#79001993)	Roughly bounded by railroad tracks, Grant Ave., and Joy St. 34°44′24″N 97°13′10″W	Pauls Valley	
12	Santa Fe Depot of Lindsay	Santa Fe Depot of Lindsay	April 25, 1986 (#86000863)	120 N. Main; 34°50′14″N 97°36′09″W	Lindsay	

== See also ==
- List of National Historic Landmarks in Oklahoma
- National Register of Historic Places listings in Oklahoma
