= Foster, Oklahoma =

Town in Oklahoma, US

- Town
- Location within Oklahoma Location within the United States
- Coordinates: 34°37′48″N 97°31′29″W
- Country: United States
- State: Oklahoma
- County: Garvin

Area
  - Total: 34.63 sq mi (89.69 km^{2})
  - Land: 34.46 sq mi (89.25 km^{2})
  - Water: 0.17 sq mi (0.44 km^{2})
- Elevation: 997 ft (304 m)

Population (2020)
  - Total: 246
  - Density: 7.1/sq mi (2.76/km^{2})
- Time zone: UTC-6 (Central (CST))
  - Summer (DST): UTC-5 (CDT)
- ZIP code: 73039 (historically), 73434 (today)
- Area code: 580
- FIPS code: 40-27500
- GNIS feature ID: 2412646

Foster is a town in Garvin County, Oklahoma, United States. It was incorporated in 2002 and, as of the 2020 census, had a population of 246.

Foster is served by State Highway 29A, a spur of State Highway 29. A post office was first established at Foster on August 12, 1891.

== Geography ==
Foster is located in southwestern Garvin County. State Highway 29 follows the northern border of the town, leading east 5 miles (8 km) to Elmore City and west 18 miles (29 km) to Bray. State Highway 76 passes through the western part of the town, leading north 19 miles (31 km) to Lindsay and south 12 miles (19 km) to Ratliff City. Wynnewood is 21 miles (34 km) east of Foster via State Highway 29, and Pauls Valley, the Garvin County seat, is 22 miles (35 km) to the northeast via Highway 29 and Airline Road.

According to the U.S. Census Bureau, the town of Foster has a total area of 16.0 square miles (41.5 km^{2}), of which 15.9 square miles (41.3 km^{2}) are land and 0.1 square miles (0.2 km^{2}), or 0.52%, is water.

== Demographics ==
Historical population
Census	Pop.	Note	%±
2010	161		—
2020	246		52.8%
U.S. Decennial Census

=== 2020 census ===
As of the 2020 census, Foster had a population of 246. The median age was 48.1 years. 20.3% of residents were under the age of 18 and 22.0% of residents were 65 years of age or older. For every 100 females there were 106.7 males, and for every 100 females age 18 and over there were 108.5 males age 18 and over.

0.0% of residents lived in urban areas, while 100.0% lived in rural areas.

There were 99 households in Foster, of which 33.3% had children under the age of 18 living in them. Of all households, 63.6% were married-couple households, 18.2% were households with a male householder and no spouse or partner present, and 12.1% were households with a female householder and no spouse or partner present. About 19.2% of all households were made up of individuals and 5.1% had someone living alone who was 65 years of age or older.

There were 111 housing units, of which 10.8% were vacant. The homeowner vacancy rate was 0.0% and the rental vacancy rate was 0.0%.

Racial composition as of the 2020 census
Race	Number	Percent
White	210	85.4%
Black or African American	4	1.6%
American Indian and Alaska Native	16	6.5%
Asian	0	0.0%
Native Hawaiian and Other Pacific Islander	0	0.0%
Some other race	0	0.0%
Two or more races	16	6.5%
Hispanic or Latino (of any race)	6	2.4%
