= Katie, Oklahoma =

Town in Oklahoma, US

- Town
- Location within Oklahoma Location within the United States
- Coordinates: 34°34′59″N 97°20′20″W
- Country: United States
- State: Oklahoma
- County: Garvin

Area
  - Total: 20.64 sq mi (53.46 km^{2})
  - Land: 20.53 sq mi (53.18 km^{2})
  - Water: 0.11 sq mi (0.28 km^{2})
- Elevation: 889 ft (271 m)

Population (2020)
  - Total: 332
  - Density: 16.2/sq mi (6.24/km^{2})
- Time zone: UTC-6 (Central (CST))
  - Summer (DST): UTC-5 (CDT)
- Area code: 580
- FIPS code: 40-38700
- GNIS feature ID: 2412817

Katie is a town in Garvin County, Oklahoma, United States. The town is 69 miles (111 km) south of Oklahoma City. It was incorporated in 2004. It had a population of 348 at the 2010 census. As of the 2020 census, Katie had a population of 332.

== History ==
On May 9, 2016, an EF4 tornado touched down in the southern part of Katie, and tracked to the east, causing one death and several injuries.

== Geography ==
Katie is located in southern Garvin County, 5 miles (8 km) southeast of Elmore City and 15 miles (24 km) southwest of Wynnewood. It is 17 miles (27 km) southwest of Pauls Valley, the county seat. According to the U.S. Census Bureau, the town has a total area of 20.3 square miles (52.7 km^{2}), of which 20.2 sq mi (52.4 km^{2}) are land and 0.1 sq mi (0.3 km^{2}), or 0.52%, is water.

== Demographics ==
Historical population
Census	Pop.	Note	%±
2010	348		—
2020	332		−4.6%
U.S. Decennial Census

=== 2020 census ===
As of the 2020 census, Katie had a population of 332. The median age was 45.0 years. 21.7% of residents were under the age of 18 and 23.5% of residents were 65 years of age or older. For every 100 females there were 96.4 males, and for every 100 females age 18 and over there were 98.5 males age 18 and over.

0.0% of residents lived in urban areas, while 100.0% lived in rural areas.

There were 134 households in Katie, of which 33.6% had children under the age of 18 living in them. Of all households, 53.0% were married-couple households, 20.1% were households with a male householder and no spouse or partner present, and 15.7% were households with a female householder and no spouse or partner present. About 19.4% of all households were made up of individuals and 11.2% had someone living alone who was 65 years of age or older.

There were 139 housing units, of which 3.6% were vacant. The homeowner vacancy rate was 0.0% and the rental vacancy rate was 0.0%.

Racial composition as of the 2020 census
Race	Number	Percent
White	281	84.6%
Black or African American	6	1.8%
American Indian and Alaska Native	22	6.6%
Asian	1	0.3%
Native Hawaiian and Other Pacific Islander	0	0.0%
Some other race	5	1.5%
Two or more races	17	5.1%
Hispanic or Latino (of any race)	18	5.4%
