= Tornado outbreak of May 7–10, 2016 =

Severe weather event in the United States

- EF3 tornado in Mayfield, Kentucky.

Meteorological history
- Duration: May 7–10, 2016

Tornado outbreak
- Tornadoes: 57
- Max. rating: EF4 tornado
- Duration: 3 days, 4 hours, 24 minutes
- Highest winds: Tornadic – 170 mph (270 km/h) in Katie, Oklahoma on May 9; A 218 mph (351 km/h) gust was measured by RaXPol Mobile Radar from an EF3 in Sulphur, Oklahoma
- Largest hail: 4.25 inches (10.8 cm) in diameter in Lincoln, Virginia, on May 9

Overall effects
- Fatalities: 2
- Injuries: 19
- Damage: $1 billion (2016 USD)
- Areas affected: High Plains, parts of the Midwest and Ohio Valley
- Part of the Tornado outbreaks of 2016

A significant four-day outbreak of tornadoes impacted areas across the High Plains, central Midwest, and parts of the Ohio Valley in early May. The outbreak also produced the first EF4 tornado of the year in Katie, Oklahoma on May 9, where one death occurred. An EF3 tornado near Connerville, Oklahoma also killed a person that day. Other notable tornadoes included two large EF2 tornadoes in Colorado on May 7, a large EF2 tornado near Catherine, Kansas on May 8, and a destructive EF3 tornado that struck Mayfield, Kentucky on May 10. Overall, 57 tornadoes were confirmed.

== Meteorological synopsis ==
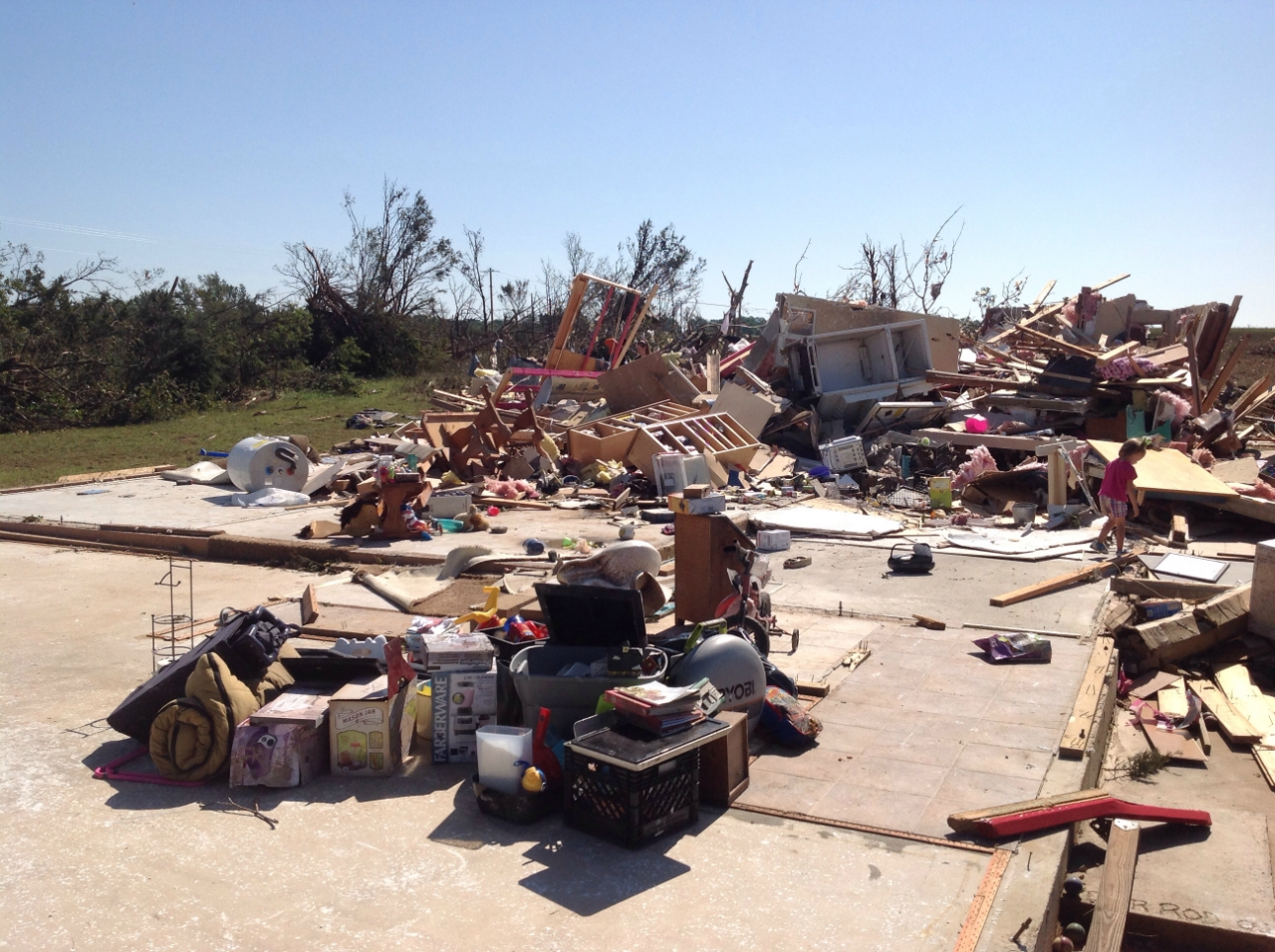
EF4 damage to a well-built house east of Katie, Oklahoma.

The tornado outbreak developed along a cold front alongside an area of low pressure while situated north of the United States–Canada border. Near the High Plains, a dry line began to coalesce as wind shear started climbing to levels favorable for tornadoes. In addition, moisture from the Gulf of Mexico was advected northwards into the country. Not long afterwards, tornadic supercell thunderstorms began developing late on May 7.

Tornadic activity started with a large multiple-vortex EF2 tornado that tossed several RVs into the air and injured two people near Wiggins, Colorado on May 7. Later that evening, a large stovepipe tornado caused high-end EF2 damage near the town of Wray, while several other tornadoes tracked across other very rural areas of Colorado, causing no damage. Scattered tornadoes occurred on May 8, most of which were weak. However, a strong EF2 tornado caused considerable damage to outbuildings and high-voltage transmission line poles near Catharine, Kansas. On May 9, a significant tornado event unfolded across Oklahoma, as several strong to violent tornadoes touched down and caused severe damage in several portions of the state. A violent EF4 stovepipe tornado (the first EF4 tornado of 2016) near Katie, Oklahoma killed one person, leveled and swept away multiple homes, and left behind an extensive swath of ground scouring, while a large EF3 wedge tornado from the same parent supercell caused major damage near Sulphur. An EF3 tornado that tracked from near Connerville to Bromide destroyed a house and killed one person. An extremely large EF3 multiple-vortex tornado reached a maximum width of about 1.8 miles (2.9 km) as it passed near Boswell, snapping and denuding numerous trees, destroying mobile homes, heavily damaging frame homes, and toppling two large metal power line truss towers along its path. Other strong tornadoes occurred as far north as Nebraska, including an EF2 tornado that tore the roof and some exterior walls from a home near Nehawka and injured one person. An EF1 tornado also caused minor damage in residential areas of Lincoln. Significant tornado activity continued on May 10, as several tornadoes moved across areas of western Kentucky, including an EF3 tornado that injured 10 people as it moved through the north edge of Mayfield, Kentucky, destroying numerous homes, vehicles, and businesses. Another tornado caused EF2 damage near Hartford. Overall, this outbreak killed two people and produced 57 tornadoes.

== Confirmed tornadoes ==
Confirmed tornadoes by Enhanced Fujita rating
EFU	EF0	EF1	EF2	EF3	EF4	EF5	Total
6	28	12	6	4	1	0	57

=== May 7 event ===
List of confirmed tornadoes – Saturday, May 7, 2016 (Note: All dates are based on the local time zone where the tornado touched down; however, all times are in Coordinated Universal Time for consistency.)
EF#	Location	County / Parish	State	Start Coord.	Time (UTC)	Path length	Max width	Damage (2016 USD)
EF0	NNW of Goodrich	Morgan	CO	40.4167°N 104.1187°W	2020	0.5 mi (0.80 km)	50 yd (46 m)	$0
EF0	A storm chaser reported a brief tornado touchdown in an open field.							
EF0	SW of Buckingham	Weld	CO	40.5392°N 104.1044°W	2025	0.5 mi (0.80 km)	50 yd (46 m)	$0
EF0	A storm chaser observed a brief tornado in open country.							
EF2	W of Wiggins to NW of Orchard	Weld, Morgan	CO	40.23°N 104.17°W	2055–2110	8.8 mi (14.2 km)	1,320 yd (1,210 m)	$0
EF2	A large multiple-vortex tornado developed south of I-76 and moved north, snapping numerous power poles and tossing several RVs. Large trees were snapped and uprooted, ten irrigation pivots were destroyed, and outbuildings were damaged as well. Two minor injuries occurred when a camper was rolled over.							
EF0	NW of Fort Morgan	Morgan	CO	40.3459°N 103.8355°W	2135	0.5 mi (0.80 km)	50 yd (46 m)	$0
EF0	This tornado remained over open country and caused no damage.							
EF0	SW of Eckley	Yuma	CO	39.9592°N 102.5499°W	2206–2215	4.04 mi (6.50 km)	25 yd (23 m)	$0
EF0	A storm chaser reported a tornado over open country.							
EF0	N of Eckley	Yuma	CO	40.1899°N 102.4529°W	2257–2302	1.29 mi (2.08 km)	25 yd (23 m)	$0
EF0	This tornado remained over open country and caused no damage.							
EF0	S of Wray	Yuma	CO	40.0311°N 102.2326°W	2337–2340	0.63 mi (1.01 km)	100 yd (91 m)	$0
EF0	This tornado remained over open country and caused no damage.							
EF2	N of Wray to SE of Wauneta	Yuma	CO	40.1198°N 102.2327°W	2353–0016	7.94 mi (12.78 km)	440 yd (400 m)	$135,000
EF2	Three residences and two businesses north of Wray were damaged by this high-end EF2 stovepipe tornado. A semi-truck was picked up and tossed, scattering cargo down US 385. A tractor and several vehicles were flipped and sandblasted by gravel. Large amounts of barbed wire fencing were torn up and strewn throughout the area, and 40 power poles were downed. Four people were injured.							
EF1	SE of Petersburg to NE of Otwell	Pike	IN	38.48°N 87.1532°W	0020–0024	4.33 mi (6.97 km)	70 yd (64 m)	$50,000
EF1	One home received substantial damage, with the attached garage being blown down and some windows and doors being broken. A farm building and a small shed were blown down and dozens of trees were downed as well.							

=== May 8 event ===
List of confirmed tornadoes – Sunday, May 8, 2016
EF#	Location	County / Parish	State	Start Coord.	Time (UTC)	Path length	Max width	Damage (2016 USD)
EF0	SW of Gove	Gove	KS	38.8911°N 100.5182°W	2233–2248	8.85 mi (14.24 km)	25 yd (23 m)	$0
EF0	Members of the public observed a tornado over open country.							
EF0	S of WaKeeney	Trego	KS	38.7885°N 99.9222°W	2300–2306	1.9 mi (3.1 km)	25 yd (23 m)	$0
EF0	A brief tornado remained over open country and caused no damage.							
EF0	NE of Indianola	Red Willow	NE	40.2441°N 100.4049°W	2325–2350	0.35 mi (0.56 km)	25 yd (23 m)	$0
EF0	This landspout tornado remained over open country, causing no damage.							
EF0	NNE of Ellis	Ellis	KS	39.0196°N 99.5261°W	0000–0004	0.9 mi (1.4 km)	50 yd (46 m)	$0
EF0	A brief tornado remained over open country and caused no damage.							
EFU	SE of Central High	Stephens	OK	34.581°N 98.076°W	0003–0007	1.3 mi (2.1 km)	40 yd (37 m)	$0
EFU	Numerous trained storm spotters and storm chasers observed a tornado over open country.							
EF2	N of Catharine to S of Codell	Ellis, Rooks	KS	39.05°N 99.2218°W	0008–0023	6.88 mi (11.07 km)	440 yd (400 m)	$2,000
EF2	Four large high-voltage transmission line poles were damaged or destroyed. Several outbuildings, trees, and at least 36 power poles were damaged or destroyed as well. The tornado continued into Rooks County and caused minimal damage before lifting.							
EF1	SSE of Codell	Rooks	KS	39.1367°N 99.1623°W	0027–0033	2.82 mi (4.54 km)	500 yd (460 m)	$15,000
EF1	Trees, fences, and several power poles were damaged.							
EF0	E of Stockville	Frontier	NE	40.58°N 100.38°W	0029–0030	0.01 mi (0.016 km)	20 yd (18 m)	$0
EF0	A brief tornado remained over open country and caused no damage.							

=== May 9 event ===
List of confirmed tornadoes – Monday, May 9, 2016
EF#	Location	County / Parish	State	Start Coord.	Time (UTC)	Path length	Max width	Damage (2016 USD)
EF0	SW of Drakesville	Davis	IA	40.7552°N 92.5004°W	2006–2007	0.33 mi (0.53 km)	10 yd (9.1 m)	$0
EF0	This narrow, intermittent landspout caused no damage.							
EF4	S of Katie to SW of Wynnewood	Garvin	OK	34.559°N 97.357°W	2106–2127	8.9 mi (14.3 km)	400 yd (370 m)	$1,000,000
EF4	1 death – See section on this tornado							
EF1	Southeastern Lincoln	Lancaster	NE	40.7365°N 96.6106°W	2125–2131	0.53 mi (0.85 km)	50 yd (46 m)	$0
EF1	A brief tornado touched down in a residential area, causing mainly tree, shingle, and fence damage. One home sustained considerable damage to its garage.							
EF0	N of Odessa	Buffalo	NE	40.7254°N 99.2471°W	2130	0.01 mi (0.016 km)	20 yd (18 m)	$0
EF0	A brief landspout tornado touched down but caused no damage.							
EF3	NNW of Davis to SSW of Roff	Murray, Pontotoc	OK	34.565°N 97.146°W	2134–2217	16.6 mi (26.7 km)	2,646 yd (1.503 mi)	$4,000,000
EF3	See section on this tornado							
EF1	WNW of Bennet	Lancaster	NE	40.6946°N 96.583°W	2153–2156	0.19 mi (0.31 km)	50 yd (46 m)	$0
EF1	Tornado destroyed a barn and caused minor tree damage.							
EF0	E of Fairfield	Clay	NE	40.4280°N 98.0625°W	2206–2214	2.67 mi (4.30 km)	35 yd (32 m)	$75,000
EF0	A weak tornado impacted an irrigation pivot, inflicted minor damage to a walkway overhang at a school, blew windows out of vehicles, and damaged trees and fences.							
EF0	E of Wyman	Louisa	IA	41.2°N 91.44°W	2215–2216	0.09 mi (0.14 km)	10 yd (9.1 m)	$0
EF0	Brief tornado remained over open country and caused no damage.							
EF0	SE of Bushnell	McDonough	IL	40.53°N 90.48°W	2215–2217	0.1 mi (0.16 km)	15 yd (14 m)	$0
EF0	This brief tornado remained over open country and caused no damage.							
EFU	Lake Thunderbird	Cleveland	OK	35.2228°N 97.2282°W	2216	0.1 mi (0.16 km)	10 yd (9.1 m)	$0
EFU	A brief tornado/waterspout occurred over Lake Thunderbird; no damage occurred.							
EFU	W of Pontotoc	Johnston	OK	34.48°N 96.755°W	2218–2225	1.5 mi (2.4 km)	20 yd (18 m)	$0
EFU	This rope tornado remained over open country and caused no damage.							
EF3	S of Connerville to Bromide	Johnston, Coal	OK	34.391°N 96.638°W	2218–2234	9.06 mi (14.58 km)	700 yd (640 m)	$250,000
EF3	1 death – Much of the damage from this tornado was limited to snapped trees and power poles, though an unanchored home was obliterated and swept away, killing the occupant and leaving little debris behind. A pickup truck from the residence thrown 250 yards (230 m) into a wooded area and severely mangled. Other structures along the path sustained roof damage. The tornado weakened significantly before striking Bromide and dissipating, causing only minor tree limb damage in town.							
EF0	S of Greenbush	Warren	IL	40.7°N 90.53°W	2243–2244	0.09 mi (0.14 km)	25 yd (23 m)	$0
EF0	A brief tornado remained over open country and caused no damage.							
EF1	ENE of Wapanucka to N of Atoka	Atoka, Coal	OK	34.408°N 96.341°W	2246–2319	12.95 mi (20.84 km)	900 yd (820 m)	$40,000
EF1	This tornado damaged and destroyed outbuildings, rolled an oil tank, and blew the roof off of a radio station building. Numerous trees were downed along the path.							
EFU	ENE of Wapanucka	Atoka	OK	34.385°N 96.358°W	2247	0.3 mi (0.48 km)	30 yd (27 m)	$0
EFU	A brief satellite tornado associated with the previous tornado caused no damage. This tornado may have been anticyclonic.							
EF2	W of Nehawka	Cass	NE	40.8213°N 96.0074°W	2249–2315	3.27 mi (5.26 km)	100 yd (91 m)	$0
EF2	A house lost its roof and some exterior walls, outbuildings were destroyed, and numerous trees were snapped and uprooted. One person was injured after they were thrown from the house, and survived by hanging on to a small tree.							
EF2	SE of Perry to WSW of Morrison	Noble, Payne	OK	36.194°N 97.171°W	2258–2320	6.35 mi (10.22 km)	600 yd (550 m)	$260,000
EF2	This large cone tornado caused significant roof damage to two homes, destroyed a mobile home, snapped numerous trees and power poles, and damaged outbuildings.							
EF3	SE of Bennington to SW of Soper	Bryan, Choctaw	OK	33.9647°N 95.9914°W	2322–2342	13.8 mi (22.2 km)	3,100 yd (2,800 m)	$3,000,000
EF3	An extremely large multiple-vortex tornado with a path width of nearly 1.8 miles (2.9 km) passed near the town of Boswell and destroyed at least three mobile homes, injuring two people. Several frame homes were damaged, some of which sustained major roof loss and the collapse of some exterior walls. Multiple outbuildings were destroyed, numerous power poles were snapped, and many trees were snapped and uprooted, some of which were denuded. Two large metal truss towers were collapsed as well.							
EF0	SE of Fact	Clay	KS	39.5°N 97°W	2340–2342	0.02 mi (0.032 km)	25 yd (23 m)	$0
EF0	This brief tornado remained over open country, causing no damage.							
EF1	Hugo	Choctaw	OK	34.0107°N 95.5699°W	0002–0010	6.1 mi (9.8 km)	650 yd (590 m)	$250,000
EF1	Numerous homes and businesses were in town were damaged, storage buildings were destroyed, trees were uprooted, and signs were blown down.							
EFU	NW of Sawyer to S of Spencerville	Choctaw	OK	34.077°N 95.4526°W	0018–0030	6 mi (9.7 km)	150 yd (140 m)	$0
EFU	A tornado remained over Hugo Lake for nearly all of its duration, with no signs of damage across accessible land areas.							
EFU	N of Sawyer	Choctaw	OK	34.072°N 95.3956°W	0025–0026	0.5 mi (0.80 km)	75 yd (69 m)	$0
EFU	This satellite tornado associated with the Hugo Lake tornado caused no known damage.							
EF0	E of North Branch	Guthrie	IA	41.6517°N 94.6394°W	0046–0101	5.52 mi (8.88 km)	130 yd (120 m)	$5,000
EF0	Roof paneling was removed from an outbuilding and augers were flipped over and rolled at a farmstead.							
EF0	NW of Wichita	Guthrie	IA	41.7661°N 94.6819°W	0118–0123	1.5 mi (2.4 km)	20 yd (18 m)	$0
EF0	This weak, narrow tornado caused no damage.							
EF0	S of Homestead	Sheridan	MT	48.39°N 104.49°W	0125–0128	0.46 mi (0.74 km)	30 yd (27 m)	$0
EF0	A landspout tornado was observed, and dirt was found disturbed in an open field.							
EF1	NE of Spring Hill	Bowie	TX	33.6108°N 94.6584°W	0159–0203	2.04 mi (3.28 km)	390 yd (360 m)	$10,000
EF1	A home sustained minor siding loss, an outbuilding was damaged, and trees were snapped or uprooted.							
EF1	NE of Spring Hill	Bowie	TX	33.6413°N 94.6154°W	0206–0207	0.15 mi (0.24 km)	120 yd (110 m)	$0
EF1	Several trees were snapped or uprooted.							
EF1	NW of Avilla	Saline	AR	34.6861°N 92.6107°W	0334–0339	2.7 mi (4.3 km)	200 yd (180 m)	$500,000
EF1	Numerous trees were snapped or uprooted, some of which fell and caused roof damage to homes. A manufactured home had its windows broken.							

=== May 10 event ===
List of confirmed tornadoes – Tuesday, May 10, 2016
EF#	Location	County / Parish	State	Start Coord.	Time (UTC)	Path length	Max width	Damage (2016 USD)
EF1	ESE of Garfield	Breckinridge	KY	37.7725°N 86.3001°W	1922–1923	0.4 mi (640 m)	25 yd (23 m)	$100,000
EF1	This brief, narrow tornado embedded within a larger area of straight-line wind damage destroyed part of a large metal barn, buckled out the walls of two outbuildings and a garage, and left a distinct path of rotation through vegetation.							
EF3	SE of Fancy Farm to WSW of Benton	Graves, Marshall	KY	36.7551°N 88.7525°W	1944–2024	19.03 mi (30.63 km)	450 yd (410 m)	$3,550,000
EF3	This intense multiple-vortex tornado first caused minor tree, power line, and outbuilding damage before reaching EF3 strength further to the east as a pickup truck was lofted and thrown over 150 yards (140 m). The tornado destroyed a flea market before impacting the north edge of Mayfield, where numerous homes, mobile homes, businesses, garages, and outbuildings were destroyed. Several dozen cars were damaged or destroyed as well, a few of which were lofted onto structures. Further east, the roof was torn off a home, a second home had significant roof and exterior wall loss, and other homes sustained minor damage. Near Benton, a mobile home was overturned, and a frame home sustained minor shingle damage before the tornado dissipated. Thousands of trees and several power lines were downed along the path, and ten people were injured.							
EF0	N of Atkinson	Holt	NE	42.55°N 98.98°W	2025–2026	0.2 mi (0.32 km)	20 yd (18 m)	$40,000
EF0	A brief tornado tossed a rock into a tractor windshield, causing it to shatter. A machine shed located near the tractor had some minor damage as well.							
EF0	SW of Mont	Lyon	KY	36.9055°N 88.0902°W	2055	0.05 mi (0.080 km)	30 yd (27 m)	$0
EF0	This weak, brief tornado broke several tree limbs.							
EF1	SSE of White Plains to SW of Greenville	Christian, Muhlenberg	KY	37.1132°N 87.3479°W	2225–2235	5.28 mi (8.50 km)	100 yd (91 m)	$135,000
EF1	Two barns were destroyed, a home sustained roof damage and had the roof of its deck blown away. Dozens of trees were downed along the path.							
EF0	SE of Bristol	Pope	IL	37.4214°N 88.7051°W	2236	0.05 mi (0.080 km)	20 yd (18 m)	$0
EF0	This brief tornado caused no known damage.							
EF0	ESE of Karbers Ridge	Hardin	IL	37.5730°N 88.2832°W	2256	0.05 mi (80 m)	20 yd (18 m)	$0
EF0	This brief tornado broke some small tree limbs.							
EF2	NE of Hartford to SE of Dundee	Ohio	KY	37.4635°N 86.878°W	2306–2321	8.6 mi (13.8 km)	300 yd (270 m)	$150,000
EF2	This tornado touched down for approximately 200 yards (180 m), lifted briefly, and touched back down, moving to the east-northeast. A large tree fell on an outbuilding, causing significant damage, a home sustained exterior wall damage, a grain silo was toppled, and the wall of a 30 by 50 foot (9.1 by 15.2 m) barn was slid 12 feet (3.7 m). Further along, several barns were damaged, a church sustained roof damage, and an outbuilding had half its roof blown off and tossed 50 feet (15 m). Many trees were downed along the path.							
EF1	W of Morganfield	Union	KY	37.6594°N 88.0232°W	2306–2314	3.66 mi (5.89 km)	50 yd (46 m)	$25,000
EF1	Numerous trees were snapped and uprooted along the path.							
EF0	S of Cerulean	Trigg	KY	36.9345°N 87.7013°W	0017–0021	1.57 mi (2.53 km)	100 yd (91 m)	$20,000
EF0	One barn was collapsed and a second was partially destroyed.							
EF0	NW of Hopkinsville	Christian	KY	36.9082°N 87.6122°W	0029	0.02 mi (0.032 km)	30 yd (27 m)	$0
EF0	This brief tornado caused no known damage.							
EF0	N of Hopkinsville	Christian	KY	36.9111°N 87.4818°W	0045	0.02 mi (0.032 km)	20 yd (18 m)	$0
EF0	A trained storm spotter reported a brief tornado.							

=== Katie–Wynnewood, Oklahoma ===
Katie–Wynnewood, Oklahoma
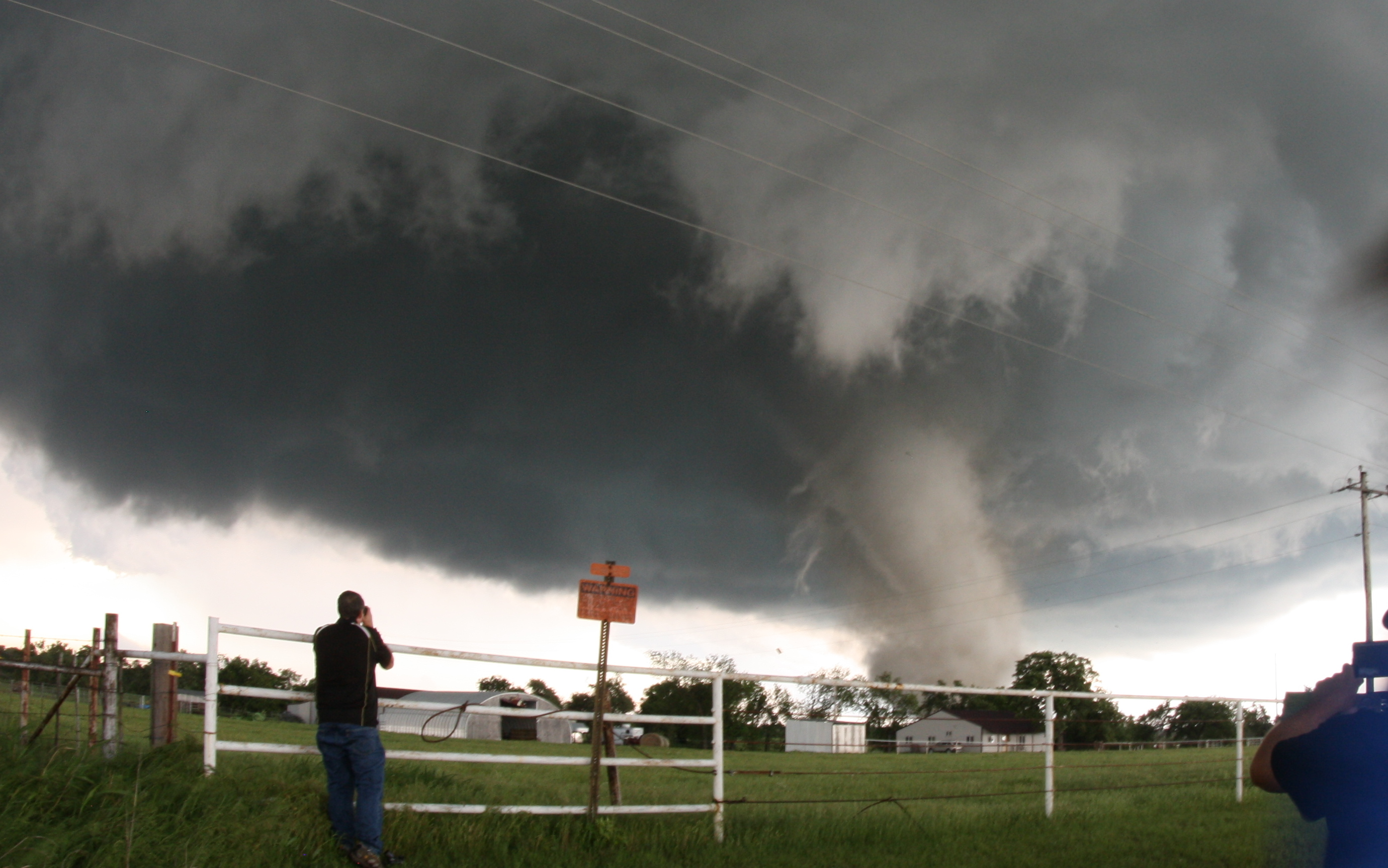
- The tornado at near-peak intensity in southern Katie

Meteorological history
- Formed: May 9, 2016, 3:06 p.m. CST (UTC–06:00)
- Dissipated: May 9, 2016, 3:27 p.m. CST (UTC–06:00)
- Duration: 21 minutes

EF4 tornado
- on the Enhanced Fujita scale
- Highest winds: 170 mph (270 km/h)

Overall effects
- Fatalities: 1
- Injuries: 0
- Damage: ~$1,000,000 (2016 USD)
- Areas affected: Katie, Oklahoma and areas southwest of Wynnewood, Oklahoma

This violent and erratic tornado touched down to the south of Katie, initially snapping trees at EF1 intensity. The tornado headed east-northeastward into a forested area, where further tree damage occurred. It then crossed North Private Drive, causing an unknown amount of damage. As the tornado began to track toward the intersection at East 1960 Road and North 3180 Road, it deroofed a farm and uprooted hardwood trees at EF1 intensity. As it continued to track alongside East 1690 Road, it rapidly strengthened to EF2 intensity, where multiple tree trunks were found to be snapped. The tornado then further strengthened to EF3 intensity, where two multi-story houses collapsed as a result of 140 mph winds generated by the tornado. It also continued to uproot and damage trees at EF1 and EF2 intensity along its path. A farm located off of eastern East 1690 Road sustained EF0 damage, and a manufactured home located off of a trail nearby sustained EF1 damage caused by 110 mph winds.

The tornado then crossed the Wildhorse Creek Reservoir, causing an unknown amount of damage to trees or other structures. It continued tracking through relatively unpopulated areas of southern Katie, only hitting the far-south portions of North 3190 Road. The tornado then strengthened back up to EF2 intensity, snapping tree trunks and breaking windows in a home. The tornado then began to turn directly East, crossing multiple trails. It snapped more trees located off of North County Road 3210, where it strengthened to EF3 intensity. Multiple trees nearby were completely debarked, and a home was deroofed at EF2 intensity. The tornado continued to uproot, debark and damage large swaths of trees as it moved eastward.

The tornado tracked through another forest, before striking the southern portions of North 3220 Road.and the Wildhorse Creek Site 59 Reservoir. It then hit Indian Meridian Road, uprooting trees at EF0 and EF1 intensity. A house located on East County Road 1680 sustained EF2 roof damage, and a vehicle was mangled. The tornado then abruptly became violent, reaching EF4 intensity as it destroyed a home with peak winds estimated to be at 170 mph. It also debarked trees nearby at EF3 strength, before immediately weakening back down to EF1 intensity. As the tornado continued to move eastward, it again strengthened to EF2-level intensity, with the tornado downing power lines. It then briefly moved sharply to the south before tracking back up to the northeast, and then began to straighten out its path eastward. The tornado reached EF3 intensity for a final time on North Private 3246 Drive, where two separate homes were destroyed with their foundations left exposed. The tornado continued to move east, rapidly weakening EF0 and EF1 damage. A manufactured home located off of East County Road 1680 slid off of its foundation in 87 mph winds caused by the tornado. A short distance down the road, a house was partially deroofed by 79 mph winds. The tornado then crossed North County Road 3250, snapping tree trunks and uprooting trees at EF1 intensity before dissipating to the west of Interstate 35 at 3:27 p.m., tracking a total of 9 miles and reaching a maximum width of 400 yards.

=== Davis–Sulphur–Roff, Oklahoma ===
Davis–Sulphur–Roff, Oklahoma
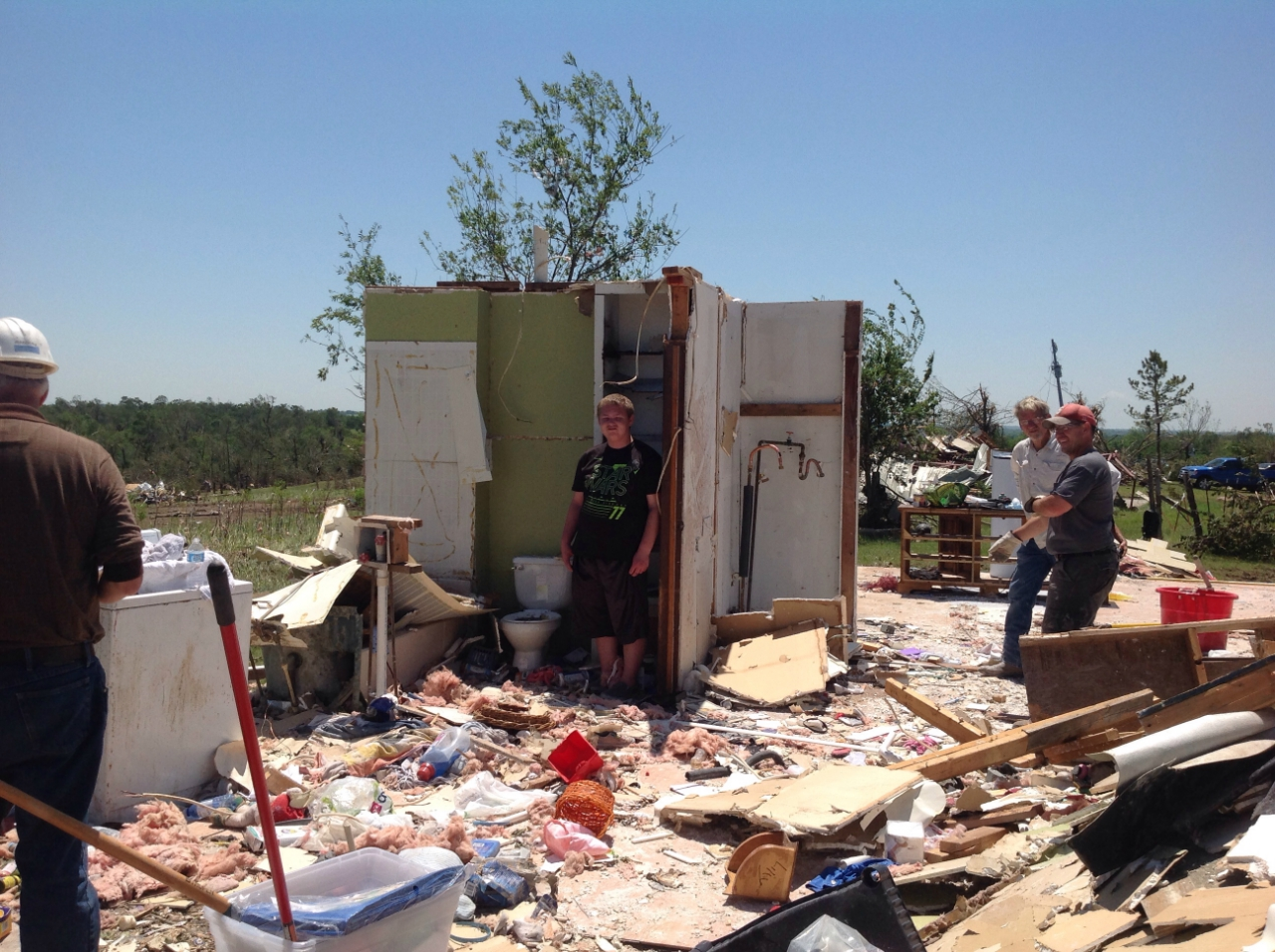
- 18-year-old Daniel Parks shows engineer and meteorologist Tim Marshall where he survived the tornado.

Meteorological history
- Formed: May 9, 2016, 3:34 p.m. CDT (UTC−06:00)
- Dissipated: May 9, 2016, 4:17 p.m. CDT (UTC−06:00)
- Duration: 43 minutes

EF3 tornado
- on the Enhanced Fujita scale
- Highest winds: Official intensity: 165 mph (266 km/h); Radar-estimated: 218 mph (351 km/h) (as measured by Doppler on Wheels (DOW) radar)

Overall effects
- Fatalities: 0
- Injuries: 0
- Damage: $4 million (2016 USD)

This large, high-end EF3 wedge tornado was spawned by the same supercell that produced the EF4 Katie/Wynnewood tornado earlier. It first touched down to the north of Davis, Oklahoma at 4:34 PM CDT, initially snapping trees at EF1 strength near US 77. The tornado then moved across a large open field and began widening significantly before it reached high-end EF2 strength and crossed Sunshine Road, completely destroying a poorly–constructed house and tossing a pickup truck hundreds of feet into a nearby field. Numerous trees and power poles were snapped, and a brick home lost part of its roof here. The tornado intensified as it crossed Meadow Road further to the east, where trees were debarked and an unanchored home was swept completely away at high-end EF3 strength. Two poorly constructed homes lost their roofs and their exterior walls in this area as well, therefore sustaining EF2 damage. Widespread EF3 damage occurred as the tornado crossed Burnside Road, where multiple homes were left with only their interior walls standing. Also in this area, mobile homes and outbuildings were obliterated, and some unanchored block foundation homes were leveled and swept away. A large metal storage garage was swept away as well, with vehicles stored inside being thrown up to 280 yards away. Several trees were debarked, and numerous metal power poles were bent to the ground. At one home in this area, 18-year-old resident Daniel Parks and his cousin survived the tornado without injury by taking shelter in an interior bathroom and hanging on to a toilet. The bathroom was the only room left standing after the tornado had passed. A Doppler on Wheels (DOW) mobile research radar provided by the Center for Severe Weather Research indicated approximately 218 mph (+/-) at 17 meters AGL as the tornado passed through this area. This indicated that the tornado may have reached EF5 intensity here, but there was no damage that severe to confirm such a rating.

Soon afterwards, trees were uprooted, and outbuildings were destroyed along Trett Slab Road and E1690 Road before more significant damage occurred further to the east, where several frame homes and mobile homes were heavily damaged or destroyed along Buel Green Road and Nelson Road. One unanchored home in this area was swept completely away at high-end EF3 intensity, and outbuildings were destroyed as well. More metal power poles were bent to the ground, and a couple of trees were debarked. The tornado then crossed W 14th St, briefly weakening to EF2 strength as it destroyed a mobile home, shifted a frame home off its foundation, and caused roof damage to other homes. More outbuildings were destroyed, one of which had a small trailer thrown into it. North of Sulphur, the tornado crossed US 177 at EF3 intensity. Several frame homes lost their roofs and had collapse of exterior walls. Some additional trees sustained debarking, a mobile home was swept away and destroyed, and a few other homes had their roofs torn off at this location. A large frame home east of the interstate that was under construction was reduced to a bare slab as well. As the tornado continued eastward, it produced high-end EF2 damage along N3400 Road as two small homes were left with only their interior walls standing, one of which homes was pushed 60 feet off of its foundation. The tornado then began to narrow and weaken as it crossed the Chickasaw Turnpike and County Line Road intersection, causing mainly minor damage to trees, power lines, and outbuildings, though one home and a large metal shed both sustained low-end EF2 damage. The tornado continued to narrow as it moved further east, producing EF0 outbuilding damage before dissipating to the southwest of Roff at 5:17 PM CDT.

== See also ==
- List of North American tornadoes and tornado outbreaks
- Tornado outbreak sequence of May 22–26, 2016 – Another significant outbreak that affected similar areas less than two weeks after this one.
