= Tussy =

Tussy may refer to:

- Eleanor Marx, socialist and writer, daughter of Karl Marx, nicknamed "Tussy"
- Tussy, Oklahoma, USA, an unincorporated community
