= Oklahoma State Highway 29 =

State highway in Oklahoma, United States

State Highway 29

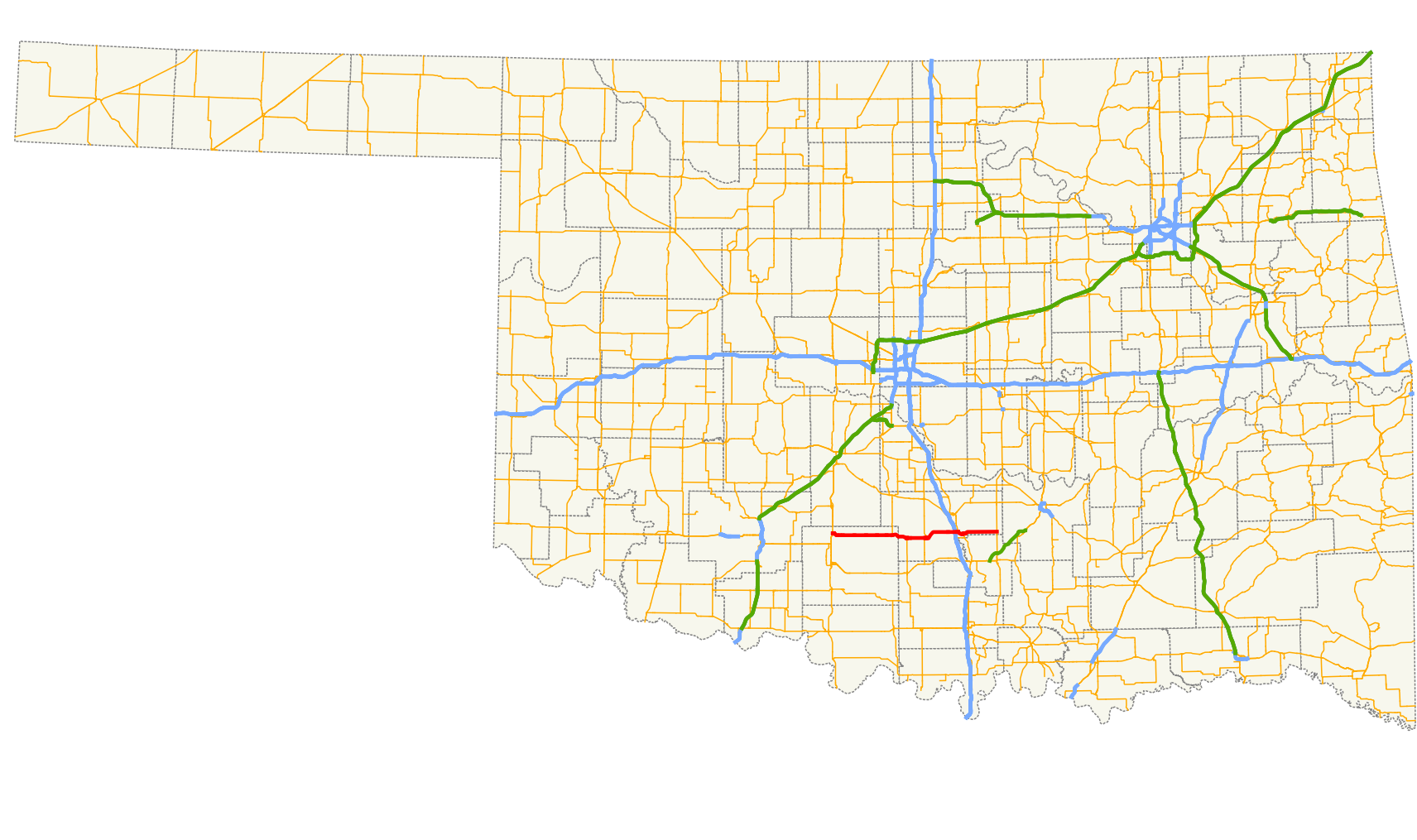

Route information
- Maintained by ODOT
- Length: 58.5 mi (94.1 km)

Major junctions
- West end: US 81 in Marlow
- I-35 near Wynnewood; US 77 in Wynnewood
- East end: US 177 east of Wynnewood

Location
- Country: United States
- State: Oklahoma

Highway system
- Oklahoma State Highway System; Interstate; US; State; Turnpikes
← SH-28	→ SH-30

State Highway 29 (abbreviated SH-29) is an east–west state highway in the U.S. state of Oklahoma. It runs for 58.5 miles (94.1 km) through Stephens Co. and Garvin Co., and has one lettered spur route.

== Route description ==
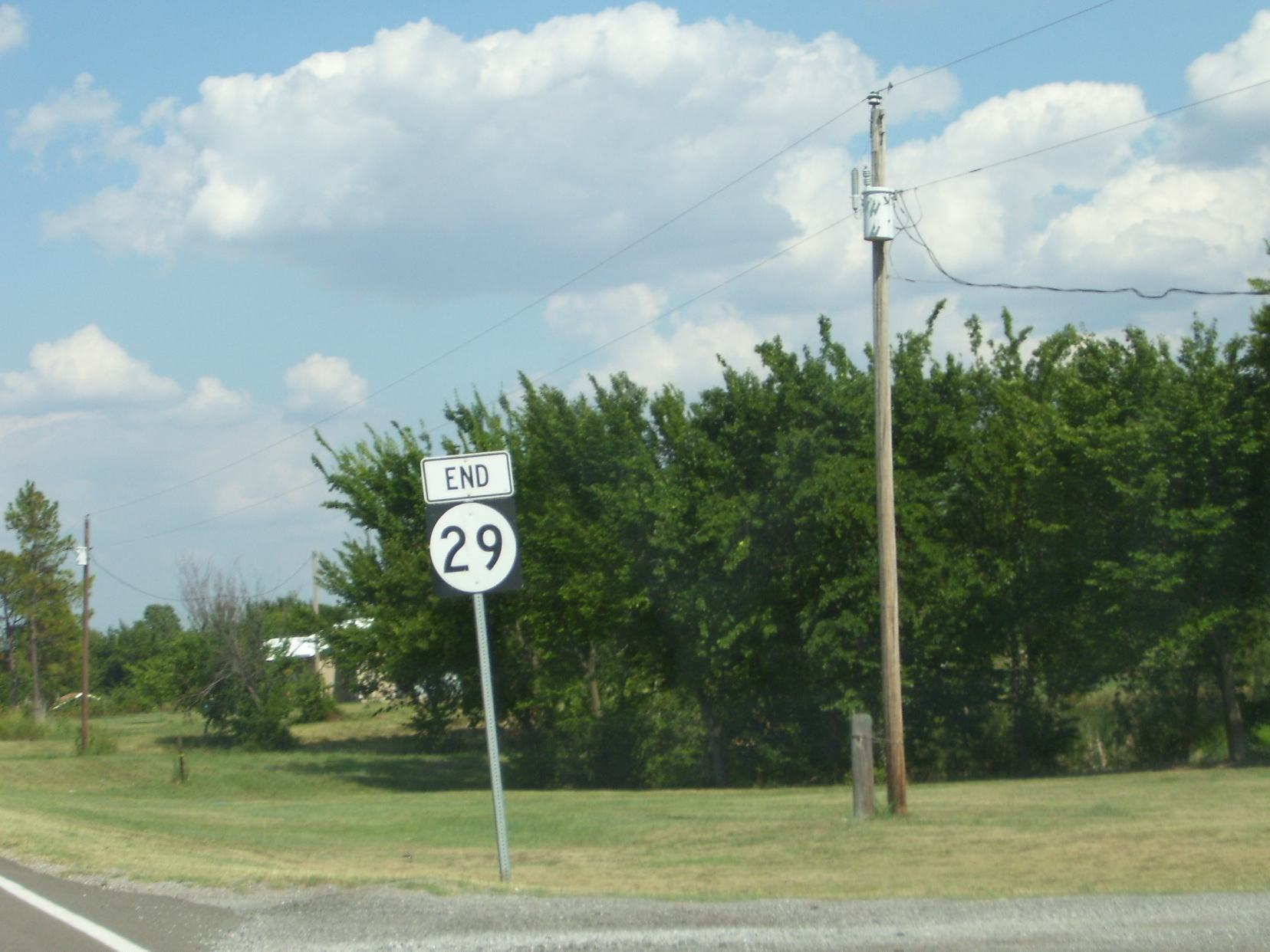
SH-29's eastern end approaching US-177

SH-29 begins at an intersection with U.S. Highway 81 in Marlow, Oklahoma. It heads east from here, curving southeast after leaving town and eventually straightening out. The next town it passes through is the small but spread-out town of Bray. 12 miles (19 km) east of Bray, it meets State Highway 76, which it has a 5-mile (8.0 km) concurrency with. Six miles further east, SH-29 meets SH-74 at a four-way stop in Elmore City.

SH-29 next meets Interstate 35 at its Exit 66. Soon after passing under the Interstate, SH-29 meets U.S. Highway 77, and the two highways overlap over the Washita River into Wynnewood. US-77 splits off in downtown Wynnewood, and SH-29 continues eastward for 12 more miles before ending at US-177.

== SH-29A ==
SH-29's single lettered spur is SH-29A, which runs for 0.48 miles (0.77 km) to the small town of Foster.

== Junction list ==
County	Location	mi	km	Destinations	Notes
Stephens	Marlow	0.0	0.0	US 81	Western terminus
Stephens		20.7	33.3	SH-76	Western end of SH-76 concurrency
Garvin		26.0	41.8	SH-76	Eastern end of SH-76 concurrency
Garvin		27.1	43.6	SH-29A	Northern terminus of SH-29A
Garvin	Elmore City	32.5	52.3	SH-74	
Garvin		43.5	70.0	I-35	Interchange, I-35 exit 66
Garvin	Wynnewood	44.6	71.8	US 77	Western end of US-77 concurrency
Garvin	Wynnewood	46.6	75.0	SH-76	Eastern end of US-77 concurrency
Garvin		58.5	94.1	US 177	Eastern terminus
1.000 mi = 1.609 km; 1.000 km = 0.621 mi: Concurrency terminus
