= Wallville, Oklahoma =

Unincorporated community in Oklahoma, US

- Unincorporated community
- Location within Oklahoma Location within the United States
- Coordinates: 34°46′05″N 97°30′14″W
- Country: United States
- State: Oklahoma
- County: Garvin
- Elevation: 1,066 ft (325 m)
- Time zone: UTC-6 (Central (CST))
  - Summer (DST): UTC-5 (CDT)
- GNIS feature ID: 1099315

Wallville is an unincorporated community located near State Highway 19 in Garvin County, Oklahoma, United States.
