= Marlow, Oklahoma =

- City
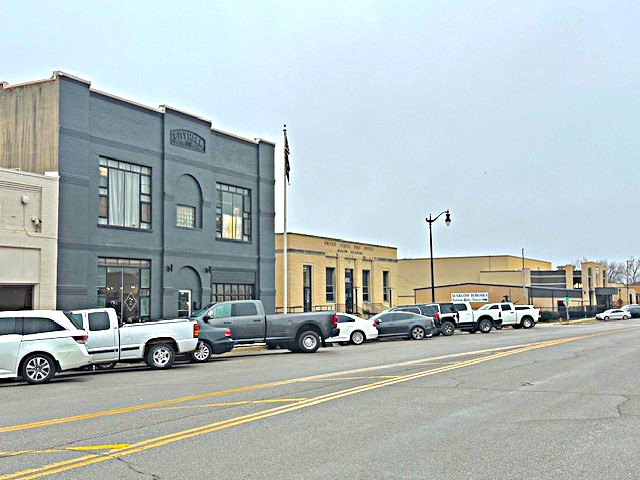
- 1911 City Hall, Post Office, and School at Marlow, OK 3-2025

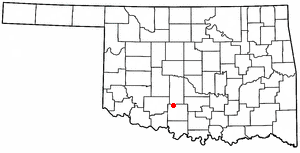
- Location of Marlow, Oklahoma
- Coordinates: 34°37′47″N 97°57′28″W
- Country: United States
- State: Oklahoma
- County: Stephens

Government
  - Mayor: Jeff Prater (Interim)

Area
  - Total: 7.22 sq mi (18.70 km^{2})
  - Land: 7.05 sq mi (18.27 km^{2})
  - Water: 0.17 sq mi (0.43 km^{2})
- Elevation: 1,276 ft (389 m)

Population (2020)
  - Total: 4,385
  - Density: 621.6/sq mi (240.02/km^{2})
- Time zone: UTC-6 (Central (CST))
  - Summer (DST): UTC-5 (CDT)
- ZIP code: 73055
- Area code: 580
- FIPS code: 40-46600
- GNIS feature ID: 2411038

Marlow is a city in Stephens County, Oklahoma, United States. The population was 4,385 at the time of the 2020 Census. Marlow is located 10 miles north of Duncan, Oklahoma, and 30 miles east of Lawton, Oklahoma.

== History ==
The site that would become Marlow was first settled by Dr. Williamson Marlow, the father of the five Marlow brothers, when he and his wife, Martha Jane, moved from Missouri to the Wildhorse Creek area in Oklahoma in 1880. William Rathmell's 1892 book Life of the Marlows detailed the history of the brothers' escapades and set a narrative for the city's legacy.

=== Marlow brothers ===
Born along the Chisholm Trail and on the banks of Wildhorse Creek, the legend of the Marlow family and the five Marlow brothers has been proven to be more fact than fiction.

Dr. Williamson Marlow and his wife, Martha Jane, a relative of Daniel Boone, first established a homestead in this area during the early 1880s. The site of the original Marlow family home is reported to have been located just north of Redbud Park.

Somewhat of a nomad by nature, Dr. Marlow provided medical treatment to the many settlers in this portion of Indian Territory and to many cowboys driving cattle up the Chisholm Trail. He also farmed while his sons reportedly herded horses, selling many of the animals to the U.S. Army located at neighboring Fort Sill. Dr. Marlow died in 1885.

In 1888 his five sons were accused of horse-stealing, a charge which was later proven to be unfounded. Four of the brothers (Charlie, Alfred, Boone and Lewellyn) were arrested and transported by a U.S. Deputy Marshall to the Federal Court in Graham, Texas, for trial.

Hearing of this brother's arrest, George Marlow took the entire family to Graham to clear his brothers but soon found himself behind bars.

Boone Marlow ultimately escaped and returned to the Marlow area in Indian Territory, while his four brothers were scheduled to be transported to an ostensibly safer jail in Weatherford, Texas.

Several attempts were made by Graham citizens and law enforcement officials to lynch the Marlows. On the night of January 19, 1889, the brothers were shackled in pairs—George to Lewellyn and Charlie to Alfred—for the trip to Weatherford.

When the group reached Dry Creek outside of Graham, a signal was given and a hidden mob opened fire on the seemingly defenseless Marlows.

The guards ran to join the mob while the brothers leaped from the wagon and armed themselves with guns taken from guards. In the vicious gunfight that followed, Lewellyn and Alfred were killed. Both George and Charlie were seriously wounded.

Retrieving a dead mob member's knife, George Marlow unjointed his dead brother's ankles. He and Charlie used a wagon to escape the ambush site.

Three members of the mob were also killed and a number of others wounded. Several members of the mob were later prosecuted and convicted for the assault upon the brothers.

Boone was later poisoned near Hell Creek, west of Marlow. His corpse was then shot in an attempt to obtain a $1,500 reward, but his killers, too, were brought to trial.

Alfred, Boone and Lewellyn are buried in a small cemetery at what was once Finis, Texas, outside of Graham.

George and Charlie Marlow survived the attack, eventually moving their families to Colorado where they became outstanding citizens, serving as law enforcement officers.

In 1891, after sentencing mob members for their part in the attack, Federal Judge A. P. McCormick was quoted as saying: "This is the first time in the annals of history where unarmed prisoners, shackled together, ever repelled a mob. Such cool courage that preferred to fight against such great odds and die, if at all, in glorious battle rather than die ignominiously by a frenzied mob, deserves to be commemorated in song and story."

The Sons of Katie Elder, an American western film, uses concepts from Life of the Marlows, a book about the Marlow brothers.

=== Jim Crow era ===
From the end of the Reconstruction era until the mid 20th century, municipalities in different parts of the country enacted Jim Crow laws, which heavily restricted the rights of Black people. In Marlow, prominent signs were erected publicly that stated, "Negro, don't let the sun go down on you here."

==== Murders of Berch and Johnigan ====
On December 17, 1923, Albert W. Berch, a white hotel owner, and his Black porter, Robert Johnigan, were confronted and later murdered by an angry mob of Marlow residents at the Johnson Hotel. (Note: Source(s) erroneously called the site of the shooting the Thompson Hotel.) Berch had hired Johnigan as a porter 10 days before Johnigan decided to quit, citing racial tensions and a planned move to Duncan, but upon the request of J. L. Campbell, a guest from Norman, he decided to give one last shoe-shine. A mob of at least 15 men approached the hotel after sundown, around 8:30 PM, "who went to the hotel where the negro had been employed three days ago as a porter and shot down when Birch (Note: Berch's last name was sometimes misspelled Birch.) attempted to persuade them to desist from their threat to lynch the negro."

The mob entered the hotel via the lobby and continued into an adjoining room to find Johnigan shining Campbell's shoes, asking Johnigan to leave. Campbell testified that one boy in the mob went into the room and grabbed Johnigan, but as Johnigan resisted, Campbell heard a gunshot, which prompted him to leave his chair just as Berch was falling. Campbell testified that he was heading to the hotel's dining room and heard four shots in total but saw no weapon in Berch's hand or any person who fired a gun. Berch had overheard the conflict between Johnigan and the mob, and he ordered the crowd to leave the hotel, stepping between Johnigan and mob member Marvin Kincannon, a man in his 20s alleged by Mrs. Berch as the leader of the mob.

Conflict escalated when Elza "Roy" Gandy apprehended Johnigan and began beating him with a stick. According to hotel patron and eyewitness Walter O'Quinn, Berch struck Gandy, who landed back against a table. When Berch ran to Johnigan's defense, Kincannon fired a fatal bullet into the chest of Berch, who died within minutes, before twice shooting Johnigan, who died from his injuries at around 5:30 AM the following day. Other witnesses testified that it was Johnigan who knocked Gandy across a table and that Kincannon fired when the two were separated. As Berch fell, Johnigan started toward the phone booth, but Kincannon shot him inside the phone booth. Kincannon grabbed Johnigan out of the phone booth and shot him again in the chest. Four shots in total were fired according to O'Quinn.

Dr. Richards, a witness to the scene, testified that he saw Berch on the lobby floor succumbing to his wounds: "Birch was dying, he only breathed a few more times after I got there and I saw I could do nothing for him and tried to do something for the nigger." Richards claimed Johnigan lie wounded in front of the shine stand about 10 feet from Berch. He claimed that "one of the bullets struck the negro just above the right breast nipple and lodged in the intestines, probably striking a rib and being deflected downward into the stomach.... The second bullet struck in the left groin and came out near the lower part of the hip, apparently being nothing more than a severe flesh wound." According to a contemporary report by The Duncan Banner, "there had been trouble previous to the killing and that the negro had been warned by the defendants to leave the city."

Kincannon, allegedly the only member of the mob to brandish firearms, left the scene in an automobile with his companions after the shooting and could not be located by police. After multiple related arrests, Kincannon surrendered himself to authorities in Duncan around 3:00 AM on December 22, 1923; he and the other suspects were arraigned that afternoon. A preliminary hearing on January 2, 1924, before County Judge Eugene Rice included Marvin Kincannon, Elza Gandy, Bryon Wright, Fred Stotts, Ollie Lloyd, Homer Thompson, Ellis Spence, and Frank Cain as defendants. Kincannon was the only individual formally charged with Albert Berch's killing. On April 18, 1924, Kincannon appeared at district court for the murder charge of Berch, for which the state initially sought the death penalty according to County Attorney Paul Sullivan. The Duncan Banner observed that the defendant decided not to refute that the shooter was Kincannon but instead plea self-defense. Kincannon was convicted of first-degree manslaughter for Berch's death and sentenced to 25 years in state prison, of which he served 11.

Gandy, whose father was a Marlow police officer, was also convicted of manslaughter for his role in inciting the mob, attacking Johnigan, and furnishing the firearm that was used in the killings. Gandy's sentence was declared as life imprisonment on May 15, 1926, but he received a 7-year sentence. An appellate court stated that "Gandy was one of the chief instigators of the mob which was formed to run the negro out of town." Gandy denied that he instigated the mob or furnished Kincannon the gun. Gandy received parole at least twice; once for seven days for his grandmother's death, reported on January 26, 1928, and again for five days to visit his sick sister in Hobart, Oklahoma, on August 13, 1929.

The story was featured in The Casper Daily Tribune, The Albany-Decatur Daily, the Shreveport Journal, The Vancouver Daily Province, and the Norfolk Ledger-Dispatch, among others. Elza Gandy died on December 9, 1949, in Caldwell, Kansas. Marvin Kincannon died at age 71 in July 1972. In 2019, Berch's maternal grandson, Albert Berch Hollingsworth, published a non-fiction book about the incident titled Killing Albert Berch, which he spent five years researching.

== Geography ==
Marlow is located in northern Stephens County about 29 miles east of Lawton at the intersection of U.S. Route 81 and Oklahoma State Highway 29. Duncan, Oklahoma, the county seat of Stephens County, is ten miles south of Marlow.

According to the United States Census Bureau, the city has a total area of 7.1 square miles (18 km^{2}), of which 7.1 square miles (18 km^{2}) is land and 0.14% is water.

== Demographics ==
Historical population
Census	Pop.	Note	%±
1900	1,016		—
1910	1,965		93.4%
1920	2,276		15.8%
1930	3,084		35.5%
1940	2,899		−6.0%
1950	3,399		17.2%
1960	4,027		18.5%
1970	3,995		−0.8%
1980	5,017		25.6%
1990	4,416		−12.0%
2000	4,592		4.0%
2010	4,662		1.5%
2020	4,385		−5.9%
U.S. Decennial Census

=== 2020 census ===
As of the 2020 census, Marlow had a population of 4,385. The median age was 40.2 years, 24.6% of residents were under the age of 18, and 20.9% were 65 years of age or older. For every 100 females there were 92.9 males, and for every 100 females age 18 and over there were 84.1 males age 18 and over.

0% of residents lived in urban areas, while 100.0% lived in rural areas.

There were 1,764 households in Marlow, of which 33.6% had children under the age of 18 living in them. Of all households, 48.2% were married-couple households, 15.1% were households with a male householder and no spouse or partner present, and 30.7% were households with a female householder and no spouse or partner present. About 29.4% of all households were made up of individuals and 15.2% had someone living alone who was 65 years of age or older.

There were 2,008 housing units, of which 12.2% were vacant. Among occupied housing units, 65.7% were owner-occupied and 34.3% were renter-occupied. The homeowner vacancy rate was 3.1% and the rental vacancy rate was 11.1%.

Racial composition as of the 2020 census
Race	Percent
White	81.5%
Black or African American	0.5%
American Indian and Alaska Native	6.1%
Asian	0.6%
Native Hawaiian and Other Pacific Islander	0%
Some other race	1.5%
Two or more races	9.9%
Hispanic or Latino (of any race)	5.2%

=== 2010 census ===
As of the 2010 census, there were 4,662 people, 1,862 households, and 1,257 families residing in the city. The population density was 657 inhabitants per square mile (254/km^{2}). There were 2,119 housing units at an average density of 298.5 per square mile (115.3/km^{2}). The racial makeup of the city was 87.2% white, 0.2% African American, 5.2% Native American, 0.2% Asian, 1.6% from other races, and 5.6% from two or more races. Hispanics or Latinos were 4.4% of the population, having doubled since 2000.

There were 1,862 households, out of which half (50.1%) were married couples, a third (34.3%) included children under the age of 18, 12.6% had a female householder with no husband present, and 32.5% were non-families. of households were made up of individuals; 14.5% of households had someone living alone who was 65 years of age or older. The average household size was 2.44 and the average family size was 3.

In the city, the population was spread out, with 25.8% under the age of 18, 7.5% from 18 to 24, 23.7% from 25 to 44, 24.4% from 45 to 64, and 18.6% who were 65 years of age or older. The median age was 38.8 years. For every 100 females, there were 88 males. For every 100 females age 18 and over, there were 82 males.

The median income for a household in the city was $43,221, and the median income for a family was $57,713. Males had a median income of $34,325 versus $29,21 for females. The per capita income for the city was $20,299. An estimated 10.7% of families and 15.2% of the population were below the poverty line, including 16.3% of those under age 18 and 12.7% of those age 65 or over.

== Entertainment ==
Entertainment in Marlow includes:

- Redbud Park located in the eastern part of the town that includes; the Hideout (a large playground), a trail through the park, a stage for concerts, and the Outlaw cave (the cave where the Marlows often hid out)
- The Life Center, a church funded recreational center that includes a basketball court, a walking track, and several rooms that can be rented
- Miller Park in the western part of the town that includes the public pool, Miller Pond, and the Mile trail
- Main Street shops & Restaurants

== Education ==
Marlow is serviced by the Marlow Public School District. Marlow High School is located near the center of town, and Marlow Elementary School and Marlow Middle school are also located in town.

== Notable people ==
- Terry Brown, former NFL defensive back for Minnesota Vikings
- Ross Coyle, gridiron football player
- Joe Dial, former world record-holder in pole vault, 2011 inductee into Pole Vault Hall of Fame
- Cady Groves (1989–2020), singer-songwriter
- Sam Hinkie, general manager of NBA's Philadelphia 76ers
- Barry Hinson, basketball head coach, Southern Illinois University
- Sonny Liles, football player
- James C. Nance, Oklahoma community newspaper chain publisher and former Speaker of the Oklahoma House of Representatives
- Keith Patterson, head football coach at NCAA Division I program, Abilene Christian University
- Eula Pearl Carter Scott (1915–2005), became youngest female aviator in Oklahoma in 1929.
- Cecil Smith (1917–2009), longtime critic and columnist for the Los Angeles Times
- Paul Sparks, actor

== See also ==
- List of sundown towns in the United States
