= Fort Cobb =

- U.S. National Register of Historic Places
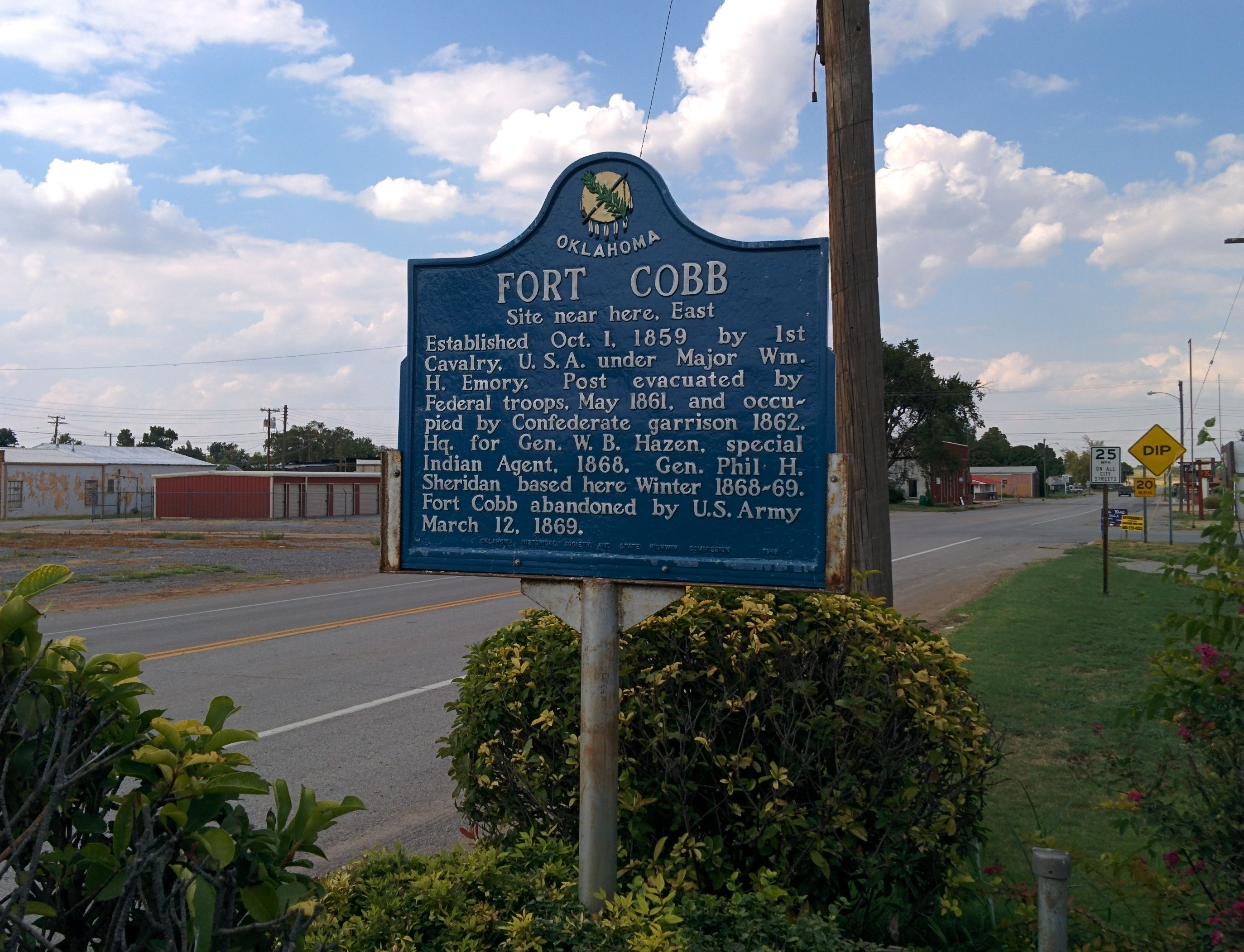
- Oklahoma historical marker for Fort Cobb

- Location within Oklahoma Location within the United States
- Location: Caddo County, Oklahoma
- Nearest city: Fort Cobb, Oklahoma
- Coordinates: 35°6′23″N 98°25′11″W
- Built: October 1, 1859
- Architect: U.S. Army
- NRHP reference No.: 73001556
- Added to NRHP: March 1, 1973

Fort Cobb was a United States Army post established in what is now Caddo County, Oklahoma in 1859 to protect relocated Native Americans from raids by the Comanche, Kiowa, and Cheyenne. The fort was abandoned by Maj. William H. Emory at the beginning of the Civil War, but then occupied by Confederate forces from 1861–1862. The post was eventually reoccupied by US forces starting in 1868. After establishing Fort Sill the US Army abandoned Fort Cobb. Today there is little left of the former military post.

Major William H. Emory, commander at Forts Washita and Arbuckle, established Fort Cobb in October 1859 on the west side of Pond Creek, near its confluence with the Washita River. The fort was named in honor of Howell Cobb, then Secretary of the Treasury.

== Background ==
Several small tribes, including the Anadarko, Caddo, Tonkawa and Penateka Comanche had made peace with the government of Texas in 1854. In return, the Texas Legislature had created two reserves of land along the Brazos River. However, the Northern Comanche, more warlike people who dominated the area north of the Red River, continued to raid white settlements in northern Texas. The white settlers regarded the presence of any Indians as dangerous, and began attacking the friendly tribes along the Brazos. Trying to prevent overt war, Federal Indian Agents began moving the friendly tribes from Texas into Indian Territory along the Washita River. The removal, under U.S. Army escort, and commanded by Major George H. Thomas, began August 1, 1859.

Before the removal, the chiefs of nine different tribes, including those living on the Brazos, plus the Wichitas, who already had a reservation in Indian Territory, met in a council with Army officers and Federal Indian Agents at Fort Arbuckle. The government representatives promised protection from both white Texans and hostile tribes if the chiefs would move their people to sites near the Wichita Mountains. An area near Medicine Bluff along had already been approved in 1855 and 1858 by Agent Douglas H. Cooper as an acceptable place for a military post. Elias Rector, Superintendent of Indian Affairs, whose office was at Fort Smith, was to make the final site selection for a new Agency.

Rector made an expedition to Medicine Bluff, arriving June 22, 1859. He was accompanied by several Indian Agents and the chiefs of the Caddoes and Wichitas. He reported that the Medicine Bluff site was completely unacceptable because the heavy spring and summer rains caused creeks to overflow and become impassable, hot winds in summer caused "miasma", (an old term referring to a bad atmosphere) and malaria outbreaks had caused great suffering to the local Wichitas. The Rector expedition marched farther north to the Washita River. Rector found an acceptable site near Pond Creek (later renamed Cobb Creek).

== Fort Cobb in the Civil War ==
At the beginning of the Civil War, the garrison at Fort Cobb consisted of four companies of Federal troops. Colonel Emory ordered two companies sent to Fort Washita. The other two remained at Fort Cobb. Fort Washita was occupied by Confederate troops from Texas on April 17, 1861. On the same day, orders from Washington, D.C., directed that all Federal troops in Indian Territory should march to Fort Leavenworth, Kansas. Emory received the order while marching to Fort Cobb. The latter fort was occupied by a small contingent of Confederate troops under William C. Young and Indian Agent Mathew Leeper.

In May 1861, Colonel Young made a "peace treaty" with the native tribes around the fort, promising them the same protections that they had with the U.S. government before the war. No official treaty was made with the tribal chiefs until Albert Pike, the Confederate Commissioner for Indian Affairs, arrived to sign the treaties with the chiefs on August 12, 1861. However, the relations soured after the Confederate government showed it was unable to keep its promises. In particular, Agent Leeper behaved "cantankerously" toward the Natives. In return the chiefs were rude toward Leeper and finally demanded that he be removed. Leeper moved his family to safety in Texas. Many Natives, fearing reprisals, moved away from the Fort Cobb area to live in Kansas until the Civil War ended.

About thirty men from tribes allied to the Confederacy were recruited to the Confederate Army and armed to guard the fort in 1862. No regular troops were assigned there until May, 1862. They collected and guarded the abandoned supplies into the summer, but left the fort in August.

An armed party of Natives allied to the United States (Union) attacked the Wichita Agency on October 23, 1862, killed the white employees, put the corpses in the agency building and burned it to the ground. Agent Leeper escaped the attack and fled to Texas.

== Post-war activities ==
On January 6, 1869, the last soldiers left Fort Cobb. They moved to Medicine Bluffs, where they established Camp Wichita on January 8. Fort Cobb was officially abandoned on March 29, 1869, and Camp Wichita was renamed Fort Sill. General Hazen transferred the Kiowa and Comanche Agency to Fort Sill.

== Listing as National Register of Historic Places ==
Fort Cobb was established as National Register of Historic Places with the National Park Service on March 1, 1973.

== See also ==
- Fort Arbuckle
- Fort Sill
- Fort Washita
