= Paoli, Oklahoma =

Town in Oklahoma, US

- Town
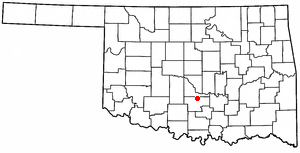
- Location of Paoli, Oklahoma
- Coordinates: 34°49′35″N 97°15′45″W
- Country: United States
- State: Oklahoma
- County: Garvin

Area
  - Total: 0.37 sq mi (0.95 km^{2})
  - Land: 0.37 sq mi (0.95 km^{2})
  - Water: 0 sq mi (0.00 km^{2})
- Elevation: 955 ft (291 m)

Population (2020)
  - Total: 583
  - Density: 1,590.4/sq mi (614.05/km^{2})
- Time zone: UTC-6 (Central (CST))
  - Summer (DST): UTC-5 (CDT)
- ZIP code: 73074
- Area code: 405
- FIPS code: 40-57100
- GNIS feature ID: 2413108
- Website: paoliok.com

Paoli (/peɪˈoʊlʌ/ pay-OH-luh) is a town in Garvin County, Oklahoma, United States. As of the 2020 census, Paoli had a population of 583. It was named after Paoli, Pennsylvania, an unincorporated community near Philadelphia from which many of the railroad workers who built the town came.

== History ==
A post office was established at Paoli, Indian Territory on June 27, 1888. It took its name from Paoli, Pennsylvania. At the time of its founding, Paoli was located in Pickens County, Chickasaw Nation.

== Geography ==
According to the United States Census Bureau, the town has a total area of 0.4 square miles (1.1 km^{2}), of which 0.01 square miles (0.02 km^{2}), or 2.19%, is water.

The town is located at the junction of U.S. Route 77 and State Highway 145 and is 3 miles (5 km) east of Interstate 35. US 77 leads north 15 miles (24 km) to Purcell and south 7 miles (11 km) to Pauls Valley, the Garvin County seat.

== Demographics ==
Historical population
Census	Pop.	Note	%±
1900	234		—
1910	239		2.1%
1920	363		51.9%
1930	394		8.5%
1940	423		7.4%
1950	353		−16.5%
1960	358		1.4%
1970	480		34.1%
1980	573		19.4%
1990	574		0.2%
2000	649		13.1%
2010	610		−6.0%
2020	583		−4.4%
U.S. Decennial Census

=== 2020 census ===
As of the 2020 census, Paoli had a population of 583. The median age was 38.2 years. 26.8% of residents were under the age of 18 and 16.0% of residents were 65 years of age or older. For every 100 females there were 93.0 males, and for every 100 females age 18 and over there were 84.1 males age 18 and over.

0.0% of residents lived in urban areas, while 100.0% lived in rural areas.

There were 219 households in Paoli, of which 41.6% had children under the age of 18 living in them. Of all households, 47.5% were married-couple households, 17.4% were households with a male householder and no spouse or partner present, and 27.9% were households with a female householder and no spouse or partner present. About 23.3% of all households were made up of individuals and 14.2% had someone living alone who was 65 years of age or older.

There were 261 housing units, of which 16.1% were vacant. The homeowner vacancy rate was 2.5% and the rental vacancy rate was 19.0%.

Racial composition as of the 2020 census
Race	Number	Percent
White	427	73.2%
Black or African American	1	0.2%
American Indian and Alaska Native	61	10.5%
Asian	0	0.0%
Native Hawaiian and Other Pacific Islander	0	0.0%
Some other race	21	3.6%
Two or more races	73	12.5%
Hispanic or Latino (of any race)	53	9.1%

=== 2000 census ===
As of the census of 2000, there were 649 people, 247 households, and 189 families residing in the town. The population density was 2,164.9 inhabitants per square mile (835.9/km^{2}). There were 268 housing units at an average density of 894.0 per square mile (345.2/km^{2}). The racial makeup of the town was 87.21% White, 7.70% Native American, 0.92% from other races, and 4.16% from two or more races. Hispanic or Latino of any race were 2.62% of the population.

There were 247 households, out of which 36.8% had children under the age of 18 living with them, 57.5% were married couples living together, 14.6% had a female householder with no husband present, and 23.1% were non-families. 21.9% of all households were made up of individuals, and 14.2% had someone living alone who was 65 years of age or older. The average household size was 2.63 and the average family size was 3.05.

In the town, the population was spread out, with 27.6% under the age of 18, 11.2% from 18 to 24, 27.9% from 25 to 44, 19.6% from 45 to 64, and 13.7% who were 65 years of age or older. The median age was 35 years. For every 100 females, there were 96.1 males. For every 100 females age 18 and over, there were 85.8 males.

The median income for a household in the town was $30,139, and the median income for a family was $33,625. Males had a median income of $25,750 versus $17,153 for females. The per capita income for the town was $13,512. About 9.6% of families and 14.6% of the population were below the poverty line, including 19.4% of those under age 18 and 7.3% of those age 65 or over.
