= Antioch, Oklahoma =

Ghost town in Oklahoma

Coordinates: 34°43′30″N 97°24′20″W

Antioch is a ghost town in Garvin County, Oklahoma, United States. It was located 10 miles west of Pauls Valley and had a post office from September 6, 1895, until May 14, 1932.

== See also ==
- List of ghost towns in Oklahoma
