= Eula Pearl Carter Scott =

Chickasaw American stunt pilot, community activist and politician (1915-2005)

- Born: December 9, 1915; Marlow, Oklahoma
- Died: March 28, 2005 (aged 89); Oklahoma City, Oklahoma
- Occupations: Aviator, Legislator, political activist
- Known for: Youngest aviator in Oklahoma in 1928

Eula "Pearl" Carter Scott (December 9, 1915 – March 28, 2005) was an American stunt pilot and political activist. She became the youngest pilot in the United States on September 12, 1929, when she took her first solo flight at the age of 13. She was taught to fly by pioneer aviator Wiley Post. In 1972 she became one of the Chickasaw Nation's first community health representatives; her mother was an original enrollee of the Chickasaw Nation. Scott was elected to the Chickasaw legislature in 1983 and served three terms.

== Early life ==
Pearl was born to George and Lucy Carter on December 9, 1915, in Marlow, Stephens County, Oklahoma. She was the second youngest of three girls, and also had a younger brother named George Carter, Jr. (Note: George Carter, Jr. was still living in Marlow when Pearl died in 2015.) Her father was a wealthy businessman, while Lucy was an original enrollee of the Chickasaw Nation. Pearl evidently eschewed many of the traditional activities of young Chickasaw women. Instead, she acquired her own automobile when she was only eleven years old, and had learned to drive herself by the age of twelve. Pearl said late in her life that her father was blind, and that she had served as his eyes, so she accompanied him everywhere, whether in his office or collecting rents out on the farms. She also said that she spent her whole childhood talking with adults.

== Pearl in the air ==
Aviator Wiley Post was a friend of the Carter family and visited their home from time to time. In 1928, when Pearl was twelve years old, he gave Pearl and her father their first ride in an airplane. She was totally enthralled by the experience, later saying:

"I knew right then, while I was in the air with Wiley that first day, that I would fly someday. I asked him a hundred questions while we were up in the air, and as soon as he set the plane down, I ran over and told Daddy that I wanted to learn to fly."

Post agreed to teach Pearl how to fly. After several months of lessons, her father surprised her with her own Curtiss Robin airplane. On September 12, 1929, she took off on her first solo flight, becoming the youngest person in Oklahoma at that time to accomplish this feat. Not long afterward, she began to perform as a stunt pilot.

In 1931, Post flew into the local airstrip with a man whom Pearl did not recognize. Moments later Post introduced her to the world famous Will Rogers.

== Devotion to children ==
Pearl married at age 16, and quickly started a family of her own. She continued to fly after her first baby, but after she bore a second, she realized that the babies would have to grow up without a mother if there were an accident. She abruptly quit flying. She apparently relented once, when Wiley Post allowed her to take to the air flying his famous "Winnie Mae," in which he had set three world records.

== Service to Chickasaw Nation ==
In 1972, Pearl began her "second career" as an active worker for the Chickasaw Nation. After studying at the Desert Willow Indian Training Center in Tucson, Arizona, she became one of the tribe's first community health representatives. In 1983, she was elected to the Chickasaw Legislature, where she served three terms.

== Recognition of her accomplishments ==
She was inducted into the Chickasaw Nation Hall of Fame, a member of the International Women's Air & Space Museum, and the Oklahoma Aviation and Space Hall of Fame, and is a charter member of the National Museum of the American Indian at the Smithsonian. In 2014 a portrait of her was unveiled in the Oklahoma House of Representatives.

There is a documentary about her titled Pearl Carter Scott: On Top of the World, and a non-documentary narrative feature about her titled Pearl, released in 2010.

== See also ==
- List of Native American politicians
- Native American women in politics
