= Oklahoma State Highway 145 =

State highway in Oklahoma, United States

State Highway 145
- SH-145 highlighted in red

Route information
- Maintained by ODOT
- Length: 2.88 mi (4.63 km)

Major junctions
- West end: I-35 near Paoli
- East end: US 77 in Paoli

Location
- Country: United States
- State: Oklahoma

Highway system
- Oklahoma State Highway System; Interstate; US; State; Turnpikes
← SH-144	→ SH-146

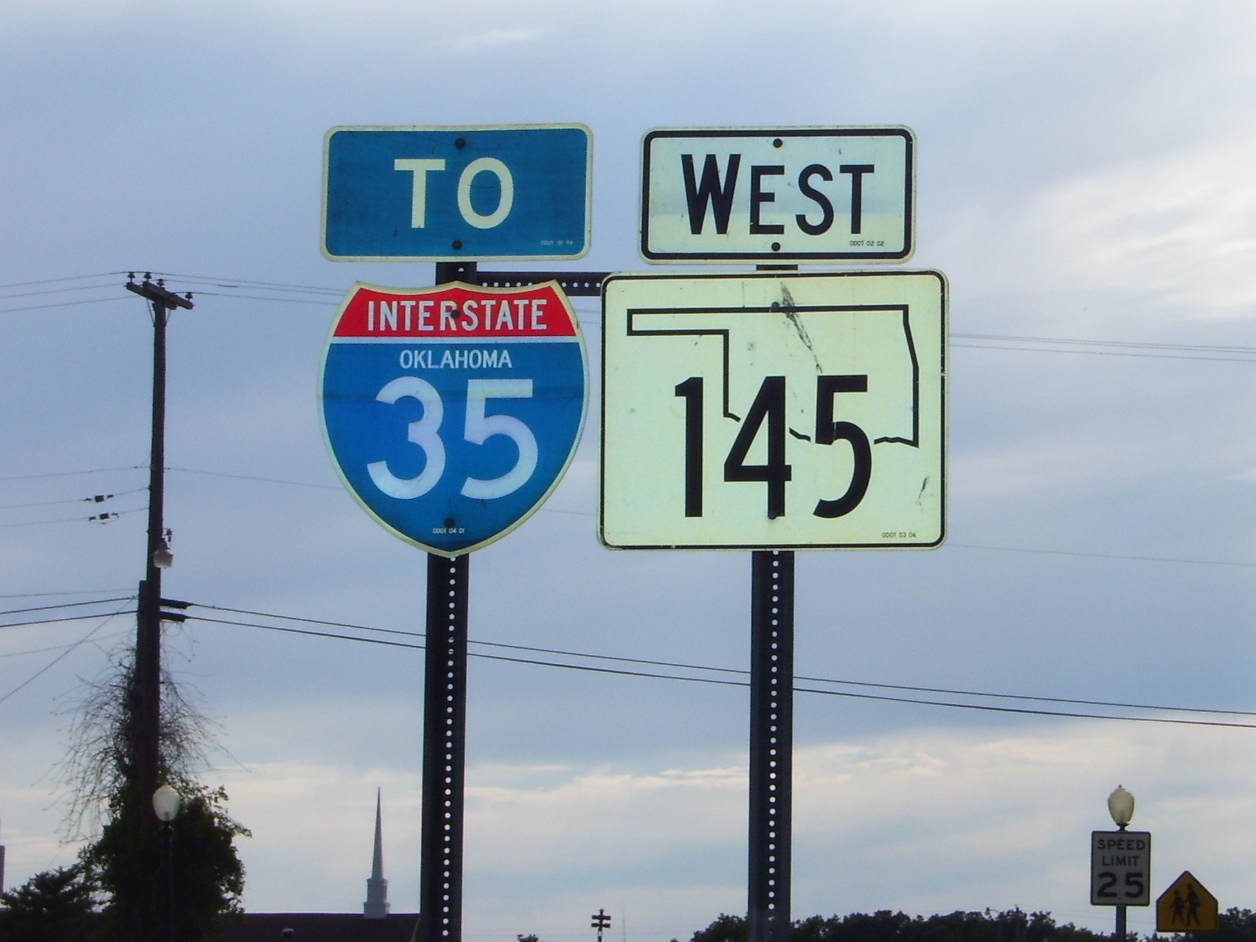
SH-145 shield in Paoli

State Highway 145, abbreviated as SH-145 or OK-145, is a short, 2.88 miles (4.63 km) highway in Garvin County, Oklahoma. It connects Interstate 35 at its west end to US-77 in Paoli at its east end. It does not have any spur routes.

== Route description ==
State Highway 145 begins at Exit 79 along Interstate 35 in northern Garvin County. From this point, it heads east along Davis Avenue until it reaches the town of Paoli. The route ends at US-77 in the center of the town.

"TO Interstate 35" signage is also present along westbound SH-145.

== History ==
State Highway 145 was added to Oklahoma's highway system in 1958. The original western terminus of the highway was at State Highway 19 east of Maysville. The eastern terminus was in Paoli. The highway was entirely gravel when it was commissioned, and did not yet have an interchange with I-35, as that highway had not yet been built south of Purcell in McClain County.

By 1961, SH-145 had been extended eastward to meet SH-19 once again east of Paoli. At this point, the highway served as a de facto Pauls Valley bypass, as SH-19 dipped down to the south to run through the Garvin County seat, while SH-145 continued on a straight course. The highway had also been nearly-entirely paved by this point, with only a short section near the eastern terminus still gravelled.

SH-145 was decommissioned between July 1968 and June 1969. However, some time between September 1970 and 1972, the highway had been reinstated with its present-day termini. No changes have taken place since 1972.

=== Bridge over I-35 ===
SH-145's bridge over I-35 at its present-day western end was the site of a deadly accident on 8 June 2004, when a chunk of concrete crumbled off the bridge and fell on a car passing under the bridge on I-35. Yvonne Osborne, the driver of the car, was killed. The accident was cited by political action committees such as Oklahomans for Safe Roads and Bridges as a result of poor funding for Oklahoma roads.

Osborne's death served as a catalyst for the state legislature to allocate extra funding for ODOT — as a result of the bridge incident, $100 million was appropriated to the agency for bridge repair, and was eventually exhausted after having been used to repair or replace 68 Oklahoma bridges. The event also led to the passage of House Bill 1176, which added either $50 million or $17.5 million to ODOT's annual budget, depending on the state's revenue for the fiscal year.

== Junction list ==
The entire route is in Garvin County.

Location	mi	km	Destinations	Notes
	0.00	0.00	I-35	Western terminus
Paoli	2.88	4.63	US-77	Eastern terminus
1.000 mi = 1.609 km; 1.000 km = 0.621 mi
