= Bray, Oklahoma =

- Town
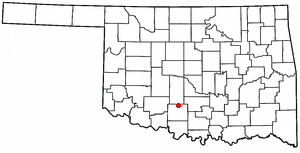
- Location of Bray, Oklahoma
- Coordinates: 34°36′58″N 97°49′15″W
- Country: United States
- State: Oklahoma
- County: Stephens

Area
  - Total: 62.90 sq mi (162.90 km^{2})
  - Land: 61.59 sq mi (159.51 km^{2})
  - Water: 1.31 sq mi (3.39 km^{2})
- Elevation: 1,250 ft (380 m)

Population (2020)
  - Total: 952
  - Density: 15.5/sq mi (5.97/km^{2})
- Time zone: UTC-6 (Central (CST))
  - Summer (DST): UTC-5 (CDT)
- ZIP code: 73055 (was 73012, now belongs to Edmond, OK)
- Area code: 580
- FIPS code: 40-08550
- GNIS feature ID: 2411721
- Website: www.townofbray.com

Bray is a town in Stephens County, Oklahoma, United States. It is located about 8 miles east of Marlow on Oklahoma State Highway 29. As of the 2020 census, the community had 952 residents. The town is old enough to appear on a 1911 Rand McNally map of the county.

== Geography ==
According to the United States Census Bureau, the town has a total area of 63.0 square miles (163 km^{2}), of which 62.2 square miles (161 km^{2}) is land and 0.7 square miles (1.8 km^{2}) (1.11%) is water.

=== Climate ===
Climate data for Bray, Oklahoma
Month	Jan	Feb	Mar	Apr	May	Jun	Jul	Aug	Sep	Oct	Nov	Dec	Year
Mean daily maximum °F (°C)	50.4 (10.2)	56.1 (13.4)	66.1 (18.9)	74.7 (23.7)	81 (27)	88.4 (31.3)	94.4 (34.7)	93.5 (34.2)	85.3 (29.6)	75.8 (24.3)	63.2 (17.3)	53.2 (11.8)	73.5 (23.1)
Mean daily minimum °F (°C)	26.4 (−3.1)	30.8 (−0.7)	39.8 (4.3)	49.8 (9.9)	57.9 (14.4)	65.9 (18.8)	70.2 (21.2)	69.3 (20.7)	61.9 (16.6)	50.9 (10.5)	39.8 (4.3)	29.8 (−1.2)	49.4 (9.7)
Average precipitation inches (mm)	1.1 (28)	1.6 (41)	2.4 (61)	2.9 (74)	5.2 (130)	4.2 (110)	2.3 (58)	2.6 (66)	4.3 (110)	3.6 (91)	2.1 (53)	1.4 (36)	33.7 (860)
Source: Weatherbase.com

== Demographics ==
Historical population
Census	Pop.	Note	%±
1980	591		—
1990	925		56.5%
2000	1,035		11.9%
2010	1,209		16.8%
2020	952		−21.3%
U.S. Decennial Census

=== 2020 census ===
As of the 2020 census, Bray had a population of 952. The median age was 46.2 years. 21.2% of residents were under the age of 18 and 20.2% of residents were 65 years of age or older. For every 100 females there were 105.2 males, and for every 100 females age 18 and over there were 111.3 males age 18 and over.

0.0% of residents lived in urban areas, while 100.0% lived in rural areas.

There were 377 households in Bray, of which 31.0% had children under the age of 18 living in them. Of all households, 61.3% were married-couple households, 18.6% were households with a male householder and no spouse or partner present, and 15.6% were households with a female householder and no spouse or partner present. About 20.1% of all households were made up of individuals and 9.8% had someone living alone who was 65 years of age or older.

There were 425 housing units, of which 11.3% were vacant. The homeowner vacancy rate was 1.5% and the rental vacancy rate was 3.3%.

Racial composition as of the 2020 census
Race	Number	Percent
White	797	83.7%
Black or African American	3	0.3%
American Indian and Alaska Native	51	5.4%
Asian	4	0.4%
Native Hawaiian and Other Pacific Islander	0	0.0%
Some other race	16	1.7%
Two or more races	81	8.5%
Hispanic or Latino (of any race)	38	4.0%

=== 2000 census ===
As of the census of 2000, there were 1,035 people, 386 households, and 306 families residing in the town. The population density was 16.6 people per square mile (6.4/km^{2}). There were 419 housing units at an average density of 6.7 per square mile (2.6/km^{2}). The racial makeup of the town was 90.53% White, 0.10% African American, 5.60% Native American, 0.19% Asian, 0.68% from other races, and 2.90% from two or more races. Hispanic or Latino of any race were 2.22% of the population.

There were 386 households, out of which 31.9% had children under the age of 18 living with them, 69.2% were married couples living together, 6.0% had a female householder with no husband present, and 20.5% were non-families. 18.4% of all households were made up of individuals, and 7.3% had someone living alone who was 65 years of age or older. The average household size was 2.68 and the average family size was 3.00.

In the town, the population was spread out, with 25.6% under the age of 18, 8.3% from 18 to 24, 27.3% from 25 to 44, 26.8% from 45 to 64, and 12.0% who were 65 years of age or older. The median age was 38 years. For every 100 females, there were 102.1 males. For every 100 females age 18 and over, there were 101.0 males.

The median income for a household in the town was $29,417, and the median income for a family was $34,318. Males had a median income of $24,191 versus $20,658 for females. The per capita income for the town was $14,952. About 13.6% of families and 15.6% of the population were below the poverty line, including 20.2% of those under age 18 and 15.9% of those age 65 or over.

== Notable person ==
Bray is the birthplace of country musician Katrina Elam.
