= Hoover, Oklahoma =

Coordinates: 34°31′16″N 97°14′50″W

Hoover is an unincorporated community located in Garvin County, Oklahoma along Oklahoma State Highway 7. It contains the remains of Fort Arbuckle, a fort used in the 1800s to train men in fighting the local Native Americans.
