= Wildhorse Creek (Oklahoma) =

River in Oklahoma

Coordinates: 34°32′29″N 97°14′49″W

Wildhorse Creek is in Stephens County, Oklahoma. It drains an area of approximately 600 square miles, and flows into the Washita River.

The Wildhorse Creek Watershed Dam No. 22, also known as Lake Humphreys, was the first multi-purpose dam built under the NRCS Watershed Program.
