= Garvin County, Oklahoma =

County in Oklahoma, United States

- County
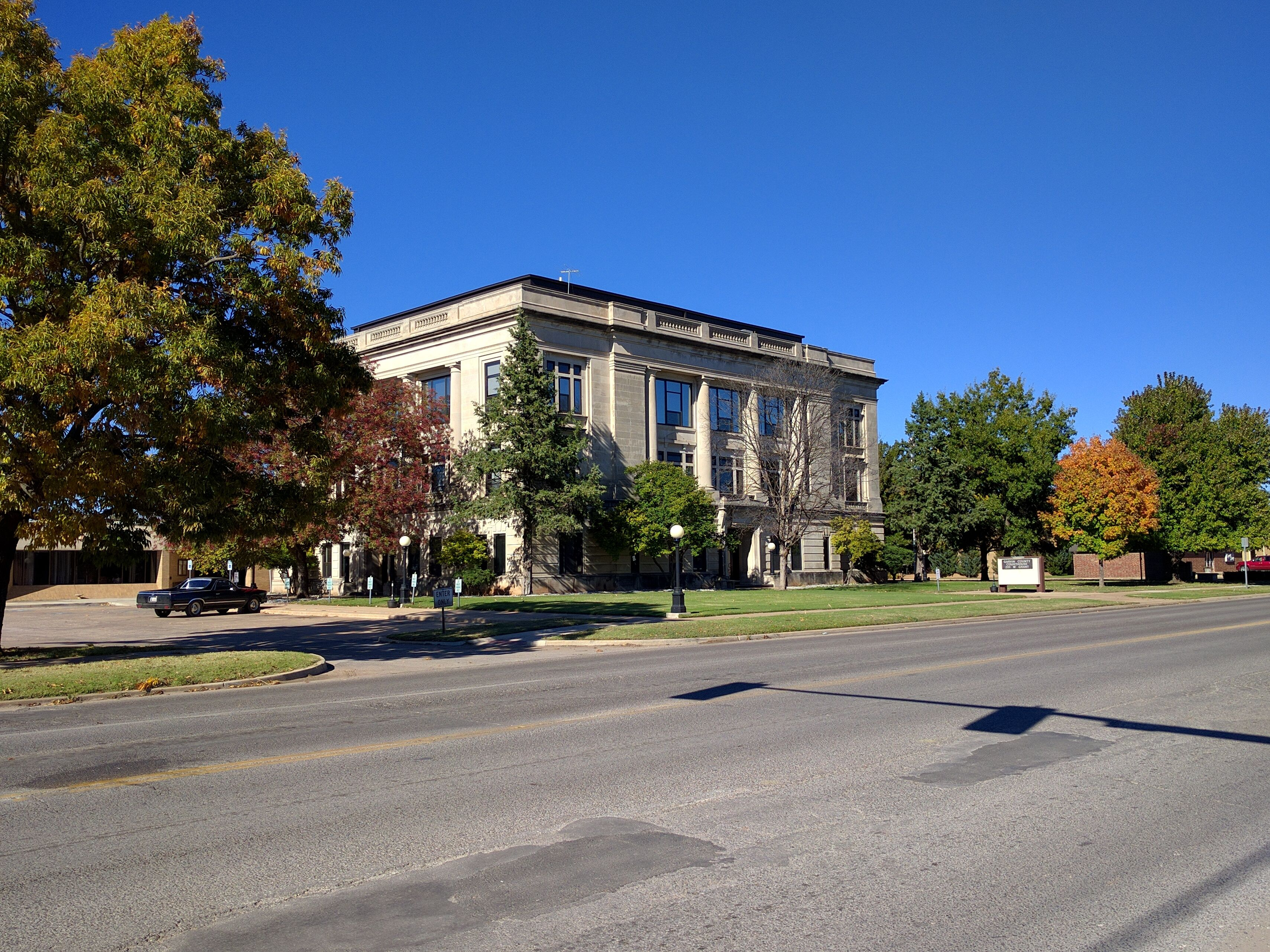
- Garvin County Courthouse

- Location within the U.S. state of Oklahoma
- Coordinates: 34°43′N 97°19′W
- Country: United States
- State: Oklahoma
- Founded: 1906
- Named for: Samuel J. Garvin
- Seat: Pauls Valley
- Largest city: Pauls Valley

Area
  - Total: 814 sq mi (2,110 km^{2})
  - Land: 802 sq mi (2,080 km^{2})
  - Water: 12 sq mi (31 km^{2}) 1.4%

Population (2020)
  - Total: 25,656
  - Estimate (2025): 26,377 ▲
  - Density: 32.0/sq mi (12.4/km^{2})
- Time zone: UTC−6 (Central)
  - Summer (DST): UTC−5 (CDT)
- Congressional district: 4th

Garvin County is a county in south-central Oklahoma, United States. As of the 2020 census, the population was 25,656. Its county seat is Pauls Valley. In 1906, delegates to the Constitution Convention formed Garvin County from part of the Chickasaw Nation, Indian Territory. The county was named after Samuel J. Garvin, a local Chickasaw rancher, merchant, and banker. Its economy is largely based on farming, ranching and oil production.

== History ==
Garvin County came into existence on November 16, 1907, the day Oklahoma became a state. The territory within the present-day county had been a part of Pickens County, Chickasaw Nation in the Indian Territory.

An election held June 20, 1908, resulted in county citizens choosing Pauls Valley as the county seat over the towns of Wynnewood and Elmore City.

Oil was discovered in the southwestern part of the county known as Robberson Field in the 1920s. The Golden Trend pool, which ran from the northwest to the southern parts of the county developed later.

== Geography ==
According to the U.S. Census Bureau, the county has a total area of 814 square miles (2,110 km^{2}), of which 802 square miles (2,080 km^{2}) is land and 12 square miles (31 km^{2}) (1.4%) is water. The county lies between the Red Bed plains and the Sandstone Hills physiographic regions. The main waterways are the Washita River, Rush Creek and Wildhorse Creek.

=== Major highways ===
- Interstate 35
- U.S. Highway 77
- U.S. Highway 177
- State Highway 7
- State Highway 17A
- State Highway 19
- State Highway 24
- State Highway 29
  - State Highway 29A
- State Highway 59B
- State Highway 74
- State Highway 76
- State Highway 133
- State Highway 145

=== Adjacent counties ===
- McClain County (north)
- Pontotoc County (east)
- Murray County (southeast)
- Carter County (south)
- Stephens County (southwest)
- Grady County (northwest)

== Demographics ==
Historical population
Census	Pop.	Note	%±
1910	26,545		—
1920	32,445		22.2%
1930	31,401		−3.2%
1940	31,150		−0.8%
1950	29,500		−5.3%
1960	28,290		−4.1%
1970	24,874		−12.1%
1980	27,856		12.0%
1990	26,605		−4.5%
2000	27,210		2.3%
2010	27,576		1.3%
2020	25,656		−7.0%
2025 (est.)	26,377	▲	2.8%
U.S. Decennial Census; 1790-1960 1900-1990; 1990-2000 2010

=== 2020 census ===
As of the 2020 United States census, the county had a population of 25,656. Of the residents, 24.2% were under the age of 18 and 19.5% were 65 years of age or older; the median age was 40.7 years. For every 100 females there were 96.6 males, and for every 100 females age 18 and over there were 93.8 males.

The racial makeup of the county was 73.7% White, 2.2% Black or African American, 8.5% American Indian and Alaska Native, 0.5% Asian, 4.2% from some other race, and 10.9% from two or more races. Hispanic or Latino residents of any race comprised 9.6% of the population.

There were 10,164 households in the county, of which 31.3% had children under the age of 18 living with them and 26.7% had a female householder with no spouse or partner present. About 27.9% of all households were made up of individuals and 14.1% had someone living alone who was 65 years of age or older.

There were 12,054 housing units, of which 15.7% were vacant. Among occupied housing units, 69.8% were owner-occupied and 30.2% were renter-occupied. The homeowner vacancy rate was 2.4% and the rental vacancy rate was 15.6%.

=== 2000 census ===
As of the 2000 census, there were 27,210 people, 10,865 households, and 7,605 families residing in the county. The population density was 34 people per square mile (13 people/km^{2}). There were 12,641 housing units at an average density of 16 units per square mile (6.2/km^{2}). The racial makeup of the county was 84.93% White, 2.55% Black or African American, 7.36% Native American, 0.23% Asian, 0.04% Pacific Islander, 1.54% from other races, and 3.34% from two or more races. 3.40% of the population were Hispanic or Latino of any race.

There were 10,865 households, out of which 30.70% had children under the age of 18 living with them, 56.40% were married couples living together, 10.10% had a female householder with no husband present, and 30.00% were non-families. 26.90% of all households were made up of individuals, and 14.30% had someone living alone who was 65 years of age or older. The average household size was 2.45 and the average family size was 2.96.

In the county, the population was spread out, with 24.80% under the age of 18, 8.10% from 18 to 24, 26.00% from 25 to 44, 23.10% from 45 to 64, and 17.90% who were 65 years of age or older. The median age was 39 years. For every 100 females there were 92.70 males. For every 100 females age 18 and over, there were 88.80 males.

The median income for a household in the county was $28,070, and the median income for a family was $34,774. Males had a median income of $28,033 versus $18,940 for females. The per capita income for the county was $14,856. About 11.40% of families and 15.90% of the population were below the poverty line, including 18.60% of those under age 18 and 14.30% of those age 65 or over.

== Politics ==
Voter Registration and Party Enrollment as of June 30, 2023
Party	Number of Voters	Percentage
Democratic	4,004	25.55%
Republican	9,402	59.99%
Others	2,267	14.46%
Total	15,673	100%

United States presidential election results for Garvin County, Oklahoma
Year	Republican		Democratic		Third party(ies)	
Year	No.	%	No.	%	No.	%
1908	1,290	31.91%	2,390	59.13%	362	8.96%
1912	740	18.87%	2,114	53.90%	1,068	27.23%
1916	804	17.77%	2,697	59.62%	1,023	22.61%
1920	2,922	40.09%	4,093	56.15%	274	3.76%
1924	1,863	26.87%	4,758	68.63%	312	4.50%
1928	3,321	47.44%	3,589	51.26%	91	1.30%
1932	1,034	11.66%	7,834	88.34%	0	0.00%
1936	1,700	21.16%	6,276	78.12%	58	0.72%
1940	2,958	29.58%	7,001	70.02%	40	0.40%
1944	2,086	28.11%	5,328	71.80%	7	0.09%
1948	1,681	19.87%	6,779	80.13%	0	0.00%
1952	4,402	39.14%	6,844	60.86%	0	0.00%
1956	3,850	37.38%	6,451	62.62%	0	0.00%
1960	5,125	51.66%	4,795	48.34%	0	0.00%
1964	3,470	33.10%	7,013	66.90%	0	0.00%
1968	3,786	36.75%	3,845	37.33%	2,670	25.92%
1972	7,245	70.72%	2,685	26.21%	315	3.07%
1976	3,905	36.21%	6,797	63.02%	83	0.77%
1980	5,520	50.83%	5,033	46.34%	307	2.83%
1984	7,505	63.54%	4,215	35.69%	91	0.77%
1988	5,109	47.94%	5,438	51.03%	109	1.02%
1992	3,983	33.57%	4,811	40.55%	3,069	25.87%
1996	3,745	38.34%	4,639	47.50%	1,383	14.16%
2000	5,536	56.24%	4,189	42.56%	118	1.20%
2004	7,610	67.24%	3,707	32.76%	0	0.00%
2008	7,710	71.80%	3,028	28.20%	0	0.00%
2012	6,925	73.02%	2,559	26.98%	0	0.00%
2016	8,253	78.26%	1,855	17.59%	438	4.15%
2020	8,878	81.29%	1,865	17.08%	179	1.64%
2024	9,063	82.46%	1,802	16.40%	126	1.15%

== Economy ==
While oil and gas production are important to the county economy, agriculture has been the major industry for employment since statehood. In 1907 crops of alfalfa, broomcorn, cotton, onions, potatoes, and hay produced in the county were valued at $2.5 million. By the 1930s over 1,000 acres (400 ha) had been planted with paper shelled pecan trees. By 1961 the Lindsay area harvested more broomcorn than any other region in the world, and the county slogan became "We sweep the world."

== Communities ==
=== Cities ===
- Davis (mostly in Murray County)
- Lindsay
- Pauls Valley (county seat)
- Wynnewood

=== Towns ===
- Elmore City
- Erin Springs
- Foster
- Katie
- Maysville
- Paoli
- Stratford

=== Unincorporated communities ===
- Hennepin (census designated place)
- Hoover
- Pernell
- Purdy
- Tussy
- Wallville

=== Ghost town ===
- Antioch

=== Historic place ===
- Fort Arbuckle

== See also ==
- National Register of Historic Places listings in Garvin County, Oklahoma
