= Wynnewood, Oklahoma =

City in Oklahoma, US

- City
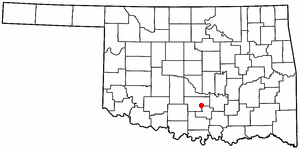
- Location of Wynnewood, Oklahoma
- Coordinates: 34°38′38″N 97°09′53″W
- Country: United States
- State: Oklahoma
- County: Garvin

Area
  - Total: 1.56 sq mi (4.03 km^{2})
  - Land: 1.56 sq mi (4.03 km^{2})
  - Water: 0 sq mi (0.00 km^{2})
- Elevation: 896 ft (273 m)

Population (2020)
  - Total: 1,927
  - Density: 1,240/sq mi (478.7/km^{2})
- Time zone: UTC-6 (Central (CST))
  - Summer (DST): UTC-5 (CDT)
- ZIP code: 73098
- Area code: 405
- FIPS code: 40-82400
- GNIS feature ID: 2412312

Wynnewood (/ˈwɪniwʊd/ WIH-nee-wood) is a city in Garvin County, Oklahoma, United States. It is 67 miles (108 km) south of Oklahoma City. The population was 1,927 at the time of the 2020 census. Located in what was then the Chickasaw Nation of Indian Territory, it began as a village called "Walner" in 1886, on the proposed route of the Gulf, Colorado and Santa Fe Railway. Railroad workers from Pennsylvania named the community for Wynnewood, a community outside of Philadelphia. The name became official on April 6, 1887.

== History ==
At the time of its founding, Wynnewood was located in Pickens County, Chickasaw Nation.

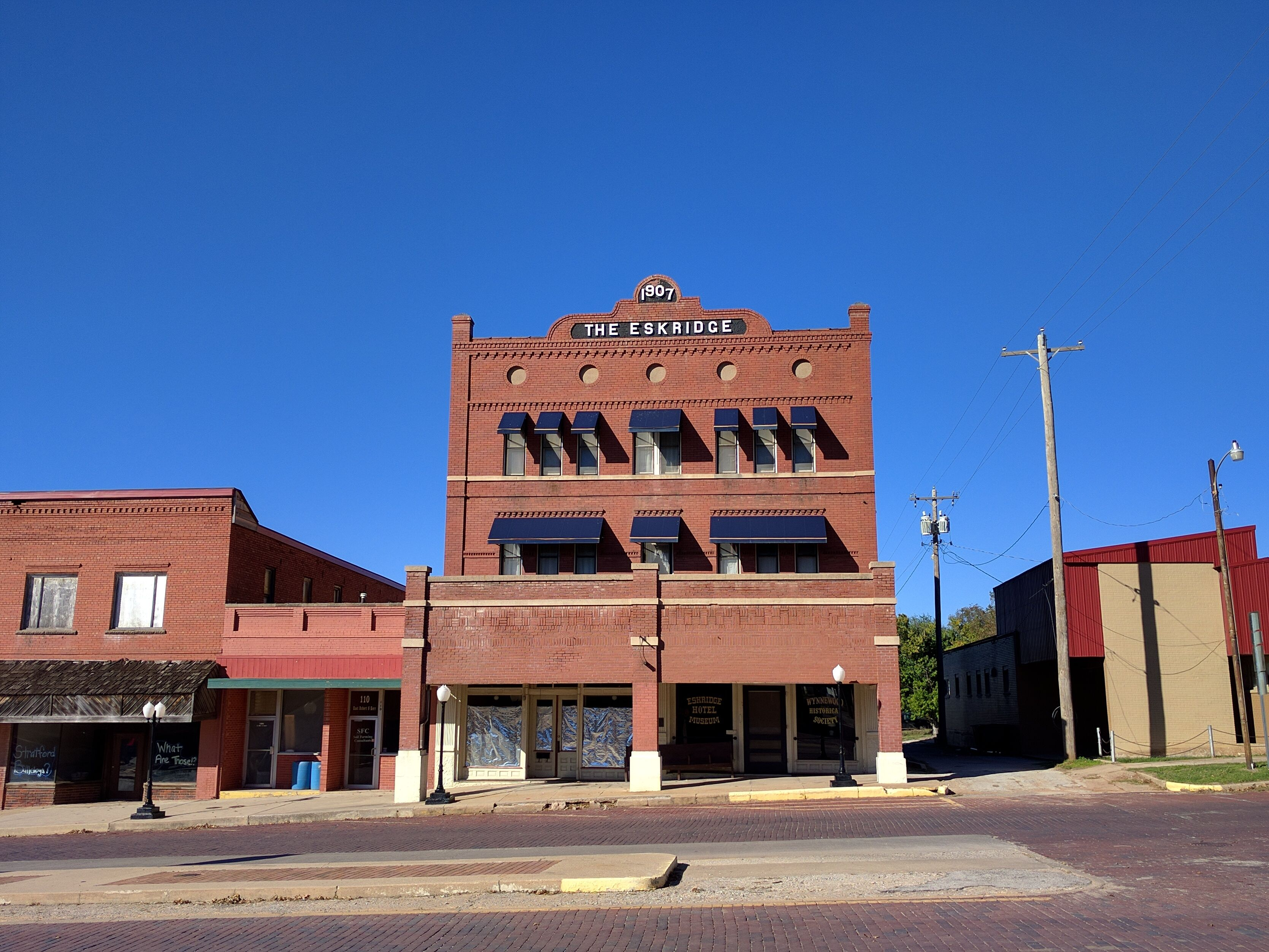
Eskridge Hotel (a museum since 1973), November 7, 2015

Wynnewood quickly became a market town for the surrounding area. In 1887, Presbyterian missionary Mary Semple Hotchkins moved her school for Chickasaw children from Cherokee Town (Note: Cherokee Town was east of Pauls Valley, so named because some Cherokees had taken refuge there during the Civil War.) to Wynnewood. In 1901, local citizens paid for building Indianola College. (Note: When the Indianola College closed in 1909, Wynnewood took over the facility and turned it into a junior and senior high school that continued until 1927.) A promotional brochure published in 1907 called Wynnewood "the Queen City of the Famous Washita Valley." It could soon boast of having an opera house, electric lights, telephones, and the thirty-room Eskridge Hotel.

The Eskridge Hotel continued in business until 1970, when it closed for good. In 1973, the Wynnewood Historical Society bought the three-story structure and converted it into a museum of local history. Hotel rooms have been decorated to depict life in Oklahoma during the late 19th century and early 20th century. In 1978, the former hotel was added to the National Register of Historic Places listings in Garvin County, Oklahoma, where it now resides along with Wynnewood’s Hargis-Mitchell-Cochran House and its Moore-Settle House. On May 9, 2016, an EF4 tornado impacted the town.

== Geography ==
Wynnewood is located in southeastern Garvin County. According to the United States Census Bureau, the city has a total area of 1.5 square miles (3.8 km^{2}), all land. The Washita River, a tributary of the Red River, runs just to the west of the city.

The community is at the junction of U.S. Highway 77 and State Highway 29, which links it to Interstate 35 to the west. US 71 leads northwest 9 miles (14 km) to Pauls Valley, the Garvin County seat, and south 10 miles (16 km) to Davis. Highway 29 leads west 3 miles (5 km) to Interstate 35 and east 11 miles (18 km) to U.S. Route 177.

== Demographics ==
Historical population
Census	Pop.	Note	%±
1900	1,907		—
1910	2,002		5.0%
1920	2,200		9.9%
1930	1,820		−17.3%
1940	2,318		27.4%
1950	2,423		4.5%
1960	2,509		3.5%
1970	2,374		−5.4%
1980	2,615		10.2%
1990	2,451		−6.3%
2000	2,367		−3.4%
2010	2,212		−6.5%
2020	1,927		−12.9%
U.S. Decennial Census

=== 2020 census ===
As of the 2020 census, Wynnewood had a population of 1,927. The median age was 40.5 years; 26.2% of residents were under the age of 18 and 17.9% of residents were 65 years of age or older. For every 100 females there were 90.8 males, and for every 100 females age 18 and over there were 86.4 males age 18 and over. 0% of residents lived in urban areas, while 100.0% lived in rural areas.

There were 789 households in Wynnewood, of which 31.9% had children under the age of 18 living in them. Of all households, 40.6% were married-couple households, 20.3% were households with a male householder and no spouse or partner present, and 32.1% were households with a female householder and no spouse or partner present. About 32.7% of all households were made up of individuals and 15.2% had someone living alone who was 65 years of age or older.

There were 1,019 housing units, of which 22.6% were vacant. Among occupied housing units, 58.7% were owner-occupied and 41.3% were renter-occupied. The homeowner vacancy rate was 5.1% and the rental vacancy rate was 14.3%.

Racial composition as of the 2020 census
Race	Percent
White	66.3%
Black or African American	7.0%
American Indian and Alaska Native	8.6%
Asian	0%
Native Hawaiian and Other Pacific Islander	0.2%
Some other race	4.6%
Two or more races	13.4%
Hispanic or Latino (of any race)	9.3%

=== 2000 census ===
As of the census of 2000, there were 2,367 people, 965 households, and 607 families residing in the city. The population density was 1,552.3 inhabitants per square mile (599.3/km^{2}). There were 1,104 housing units at an average density of 724.0 units per square mile (279.5 units/km^{2}). The racial makeup of the city was 77.27% White, 10.73% African American, 7.77% Native American, 0.17% Asian, 0.68% from other races, and 3.38% from two or more races. Hispanic or Latino of any race were 2.83% of the population.

There were 965 households, out of which 29.4% had children under the age of 18 living with them, 44.4% were married couples living together, 15.1% had a female householder with no husband present, and 37.0% were non-families. 33.3% of all households were made up of individuals, and 18.7% had someone living alone who was 65 years of age or older. The average household size was 2.39 and the average family size was 3.05.

In the city, the population was spread out, with 26.0% under the age of 18, 8.1% from 18 to 24, 24.5% from 25 to 44, 21.2% from 45 to 64, and 20.3% who were 65 years of age or older. The median age was 39 years. For every 100 females, there were 83.3 males. For every 100 females age 18 and over, there were 74.9 males.

The median income for a household in the city was $26,149, and the median income for a family was $31,856. Males had a median income of $28,929 versus $19,375 for females. The per capita income for the city was $13,539. About 13.6% of families and 15.9% of the population were below the poverty line, including 22.8% of those under age 18 and 15.1% of those age 65 or over.

== Economy ==
For many years, the local economy was based on agriculture. Principal crops in the early 20th century included pecans, peaches, corn, wheat, oats, alfalfa, cotton and clover. A cottonseed oil company and four cotton gins supported the cotton industry.

The local petroleum industry blossomed in Garvin County during the second decade of the 20th century. The Texas Pacific Coal and Oil Company built an oil refinery in Wynnewood during 1922–23. Kerr-McGee Company bought the refinery in 1950. By 1957, employment at the refinery was about equal to all other employment in the Wynnewood vicinity. The Gary-Williams Energy Corporation bought the facility in 1995. In 2012, noted investor Carl Icahn announced that he had bought a controlling interest in CVR industries, which owned the 70,000 barrel per day refinery (BPD) at Wynnewood and a 115,000 BPD refinery at Coffeyville, Kansas. The Wynnewood refinery was one of only five operating in Oklahoma as of 2015.

== Media ==
The Wynnewood Gazette began publication in 1906, and has continued into the 21st century. The Gazette in 1979 reported a story in nearby Elmore City about whether to allow high school students there to dance at a graduation celebration in the face of a town ordinance prohibiting public dancing; this controversy was picked up by national papers and became the core idea behind the movie Footloose (1984).

Other early newspapers were the Wynnewood Republic and the Wynnewood Times.

== Notable people ==
- James Allen, former NFL running back for the Chicago Bears and Houston Texans
- Joe Exotic, zookeeper and the subject of the documentary series Tiger King
- Tommy Franks, general who commanded the invasion forces of Operation Enduring Freedom in Afghanistan and Operation Iraqi Freedom in Iraq
- Roy Milton (1907–1983), musician and bandleader
- Donna Shirley, who led the Mars Pathfinder project at the Jet Propulsion Laboratory

== See also ==
- List of oil refineries
