= Tussy, Oklahoma =

Unincorporated community in Oklahoma, US

- Unincorporated community
- Location within Oklahoma Location within the United States
- Coordinates: 34°30′24″N 97°32′35″W
- Country: United States
- State: Oklahoma
- Counties: Carter and Garvin
- Elevation: 984 ft (300 m)
- Time zone: UTC-6 (Central (CST))
  - Summer (DST): UTC-5 (CDT)
- Area codes: 539/918
- GNIS feature ID: 1100900

Tussy is an unincorporated community in Carter and Garvin counties, Oklahoma, United States. Tussy is 5 miles (8.0 km) west-northwest of Tatums. The post office was established March 1, 1890. The town of Tussy was named for Henry B. Tussy, rancher and cattleman.
