= Erin Springs, Oklahoma =

Town in Oklahoma, US

- Town
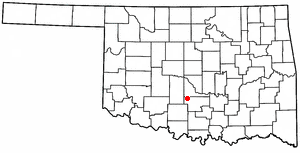
- Location of Erin Springs, Oklahoma
- Coordinates: 34°48′40″N 97°36′20″W
- Country: United States
- State: Oklahoma
- County: Garvin

Area
  - Total: 0.18 sq mi (0.46 km^{2})
  - Land: 0.17 sq mi (0.45 km^{2})
  - Water: 0 sq mi (0.00 km^{2})
- Elevation: 988 ft (301 m)

Population (2020)
  - Total: 89
  - Density: 509.0/sq mi (196.51/km^{2})
- Time zone: UTC-6 (Central (CST))
  - Summer (DST): UTC-5 (CDT)
- FIPS code: 40-24300
- GNIS feature ID: 2412600

Erin Springs is a town in Garvin County, Oklahoma, United States. As of the 2020 census, Erin Springs had a population of 89.

== History ==
The town began in 1871, when Frank Murray, an Irish immigrant from Londonderry, built a home at this location. He later became a large landowner and cattle rancher, owning 20,000 acres (8,100 ha) of land and 26,000 head of cattle. The community was initially known as Elm Springs, for a large elm tree that grew behind the stage depot.

Elm Springs was renamed Erin Springs, in honor of Frank Murray's sister, Erin Westland.

== Geography ==
According to the United States Census Bureau, the town has a total area of 0.2 square miles (0.52 km^{2}), all land.

== Demographics ==
Historical population
Census	Pop.	Note	%±
2020	89		—
U.S. Decennial Census

=== 2020 census ===
As of the 2020 census, Erin Springs had a population of 89. The median age was 39.8 years. 23.6% of residents were under the age of 18 and 23.6% of residents were 65 years of age or older. For every 100 females there were 74.5 males, and for every 100 females age 18 and over there were 61.9 males age 18 and over.

0.0% of residents lived in urban areas, while 100.0% lived in rural areas.

There were 35 households in Erin Springs, of which 37.1% had children under the age of 18 living in them. Of all households, 60.0% were married-couple households, 8.6% were households with a male householder and no spouse or partner present, and 31.4% were households with a female householder and no spouse or partner present. About 25.8% of all households were made up of individuals and 11.4% had someone living alone who was 65 years of age or older.

There were 42 housing units, of which 16.7% were vacant. The homeowner vacancy rate was 7.1% and the rental vacancy rate was 0.0%.

Racial composition as of the 2020 census
Race	Number	Percent
White	75	84.3%
Black or African American	0	0.0%
American Indian and Alaska Native	3	3.4%
Asian	0	0.0%
Native Hawaiian and Other Pacific Islander	0	0.0%
Some other race	0	0.0%
Two or more races	11	12.4%
Hispanic or Latino (of any race)	9	10.1%

=== 2010 census ===
As of the census of 2010, there were 87 people, 36 households, and 25 families residing in the town. The population density was 435 inhabitants per square mile (168/km^{2}). There were 41 housing units at an average density of 288.4 per square mile (111.4/km^{2}). The racial makeup of the town was 88.5% White, 4.6% Native American, 1.1% from Asian, and 5.7% from two or more races.

There were 36 households, out of which 19.4% had children under the age of 18 living with them, 55.6% were married couples living together, 8.3% had a female householder with no husband present, and 30.6% were non-families. A quarter of the households (25%) were made up of individuals, and 16.7% had someone living alone who was 65 years of age or older. The average household size was 2.42 and the average family size was 2.88.

In the town, the population was spread out, with 26.3% under the age of 18, 6.1% from 18 to 24, 21.9% from 25 to 44, 26.3% from 45 to 64, and 17.2% who were 65 years of age or older. The median age was 41.5 years. For every 100 females, there were 83.9 males. For every 100 females age 18 and over, there were 82.6 males.

The median income for a household in the town was $43,125, and the median income for a family was $18,929. Males had a median income of $65,875 versus $14,883 for females. The per capita income for the town was $25,600. Almost half (46.3%) of the population and 47.8% of families were below the poverty line.
