= Fort Arbuckle (Oklahoma) =

- Fort Arbuckle Site
- U.S. National Register of Historic Places
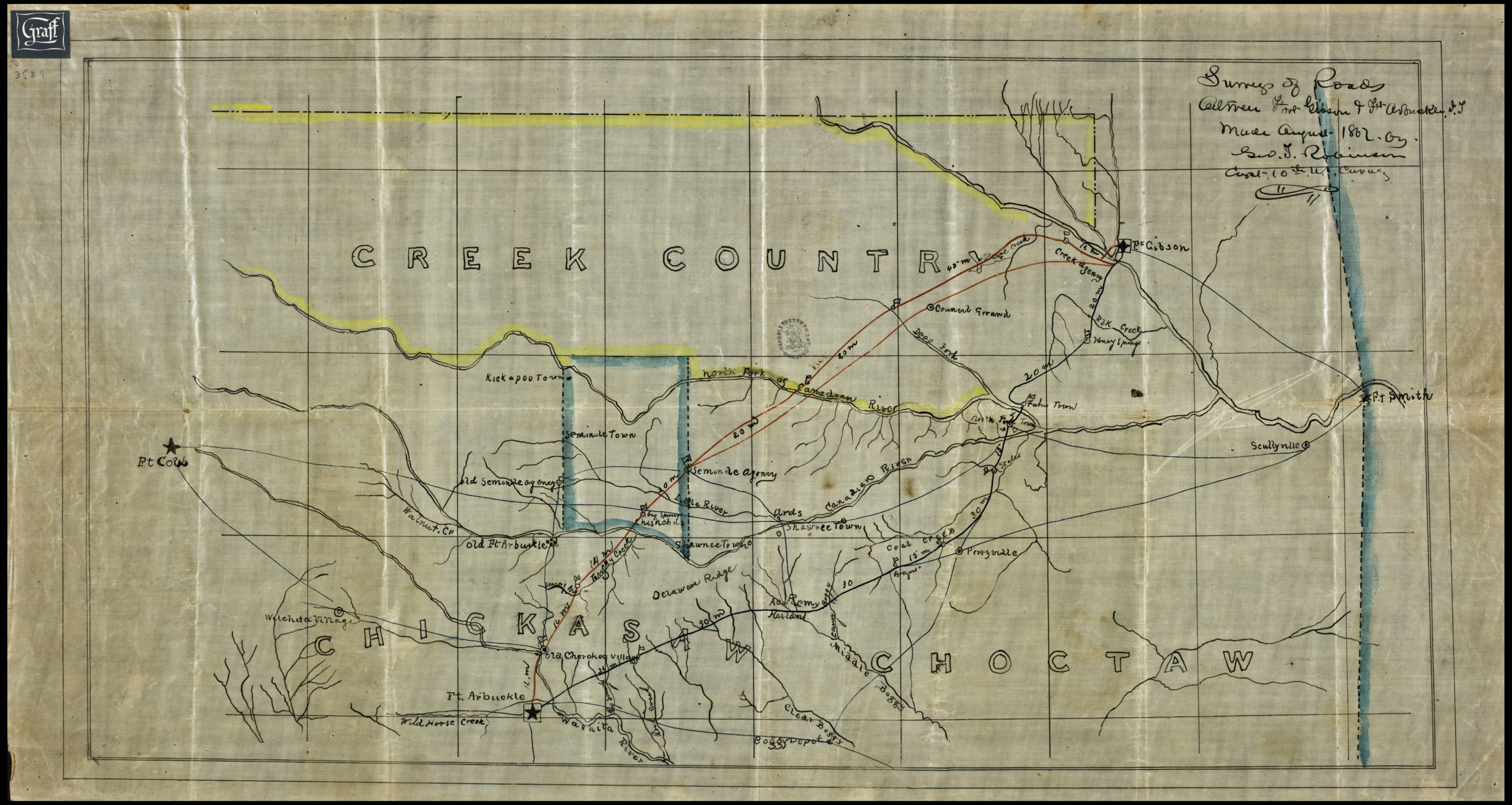
- Trail survey of Fort Arbuckle ca. 1867

- Location within Oklahoma Location within the United States
- Location: Garvin County, about 0.5 mi. N of Hoover on SR, Hoover, Oklahoma
- Nearest city: Davis, Oklahoma
- Coordinates: 34°31′39″N 97°15′0″W
- Built: 1852
- Architect: U.S. Army
- NRHP reference No.: 72001064
- Added to NRHP: June 13, 1972

Fort Arbuckle was constructed by the US Army in 1850 to counter raids by Plains Indian tribes on immigrant trains heading west to California and on the settlements of Choctaw and Chickasaw nations in Indian Territory.

Captain Randolph B. Marcy was assigned to select the site and oversee construction of the fort, named to honor the recently deceased General Matthew Arbuckle. The site was inside the boundary of the Chickasaw Nation and on the bank of the Washita River, 6 miles (9.7 km) west and 1 mile (1.6 km) north of the present town of Davis, Oklahoma. The overall size of the post was originally 12 miles (19 km) by 12 miles (19 km), allowing enough room for friendly tribes to camp under the protection of the post.

Marcy and his men constructed a rectangular fort, with barracks on opposite sides and the quartermaster and commissary facilities at opposite ends. Eventually the fort consisted of thirty buildings constructed of hewn logs, with stone chimneys.

Major William H. Emory of the First Cavalry was appointed commander of both Fort Arbuckle and Fort Washita in 1858. He found the facilities at the fort inadequate. Many of the buildings were in a poor state of repair; ordnance stores were depleted; and surplus ammunition and gunpowder had to be buried in order to be weather protected. But before the troops could remedy these faults, they received orders to build another fort, this one named Fort Cobb.

On May 3, 1861, after the Civil War broke out, Major Emory ordered the three forts under his command to be evacuated, with the troops going to Fort Leavenworth in Kansas, which supported the Union. The government of the Chickasaw Nation had already decided to support the Confederacy. Although Fort Arbuckle was briefly occupied by Confederate troops, no battle occurred in the vicinity, and it played no part in the war. After the war, the post was garrisoned by troops from the Sixth Infantry and Tenth Cavalry. The United States began to undertake campaigns against the Plains Indians west of here.

In 1868 General Philip Sheridan planned to use Fort Arbuckle as a supply depot for his campaigns against the Comanche. By the following spring, a great store of hay and grain had been brought by the river to Fort Gibson and then by wagon to Fort Arbuckle. Sheridan sent many of his horses to the fort to be fed. Four companies of the Tenth Cavalry came to Fort Arbuckle for this purpose.

Fort Arbuckle was strategically obsolete by 1869, when Fort Sill was constructed farther west. Most of the Arbuckle garrison were sent there, after their horses had consumed the remaining supplies. The post was permanently abandoned in 1870. A single stone chimney is one of the only relics remaining of the old fort.

== See also ==
- Fort Cobb
- Fort Sill
- Fort Washita
