= Elmore City, Oklahoma =

Town in Oklahoma, US

- Town
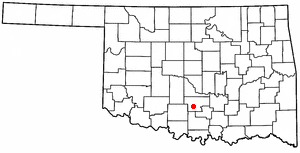
- Location of Elmore City, Oklahoma
- Coordinates: 34°37′24″N 97°23′40″W
- Country: United States
- State: Oklahoma
- County: Garvin

Area
  - Total: 1.07 sq mi (2.78 km^{2})
  - Land: 0.98 sq mi (2.54 km^{2})
  - Water: 0.093 sq mi (0.24 km^{2})
- Elevation: 988 ft (301 m)

Population (2020)
  - Total: 738
  - Density: 752.8/sq mi (290.65/km^{2})
- Time zone: UTC-6 (Central (CST))
  - Summer (DST): UTC-5 (CDT)
- ZIP codes: 73433, 73476
- Area code: 580
- FIPS code: 40-23600
- GNIS feature ID: 2412480

Elmore City is a town in Garvin County, Oklahoma, United States. This town is 58 miles (93 kilometers) south of Oklahoma City. The population was 738 at the time of the 2020 census, up from 697 at the 2010 census. It was named after J. O. Elmore.

There are two main highways running through Elmore City. One of the Highways is Oklahoma State Highway 29, running west–east. The other is Oklahoma State Highway 74, running north–south. It is about 12 miles (19 km) west of Wynnewood, 25 1/2 miles (41 km) south of Purcell, and 23 miles (37 km) west of U.S. Highway 177.

== History ==
The first business in Elmore City was opened by Jasper N. Black in an area just northeast of what is now Elmore City. Historians state that after Black opened his supply store in 1890 on Rock Creek, the number of settlers quickly grew and a community was formed called Banner. Banner quickly spread to the southwest and a post office was established and the name changed to Elmore for J. O. Elmore, another prominent business man. The word city was added to Elmore after the name was confused with Elmer in Jackson County. The city was incorporated as a community in 1898.

At the time of its founding, Elmore City was located in Pickens County, Chickasaw Nation.

The movie Footloose (1984) was loosely based on events that took place in the town. Elmore City had a ban, dating from before statehood, on public dancing within town limits. High school students during the 1979-1980 class year began lobbying for the right to hold a school prom with dancing. However, during the first town meeting on the issue, perhaps three-quarters of the crowd was against the idea, led by local church leaders. The controversy was picked up by local newspapers, went national, and ended up as a small item in a San Francisco paper. This was where songwriter/screenwriter Dean Pitchford, who was looking for a movie musical idea, ran across it. The eventual result was the 1984 movie. As to the prom, the town mayor sided with the kids, declaring that a high school function was not a “public” event. The school board then authorized the prom, which proceeded and received national coverage.

== Geography ==
According to the United States Census Bureau, the town has a total area of 0.4 square miles (1.0 km^{2}), all land.

== Demographics ==
Historical population
Census	Pop.	Note	%±
1900	192		—
1910	266		38.5%
1920	337		26.7%
1930	395		17.2%
1940	494		25.1%
1950	743		50.4%
1960	982		32.2%
1970	653		−33.5%
1980	582		−10.9%
1990	493		−15.3%
2000	756		53.3%
2010	697		−7.8%
2020	738		5.9%
U.S. Decennial Census

=== 2020 census ===
As of the 2020 census, Elmore City had a population of 738. The median age was 35.8 years. 27.4% of residents were under the age of 18 and 15.7% of residents were 65 years of age or older. For every 100 females there were 94.2 males, and for every 100 females age 18 and over there were 90.1 males age 18 and over.

0.0% of residents lived in urban areas, while 100.0% lived in rural areas.

There were 272 households in Elmore City, of which 38.2% had children under the age of 18 living in them. Of all households, 48.2% were married-couple households, 15.4% were households with a male householder and no spouse or partner present, and 27.9% were households with a female householder and no spouse or partner present. About 26.8% of all households were made up of individuals and 10.3% had someone living alone who was 65 years of age or older.

There were 347 housing units, of which 21.6% were vacant. The homeowner vacancy rate was 3.6% and the rental vacancy rate was 14.1%.

Racial composition as of the 2020 census
Race	Number	Percent
White	582	78.9%
Black or African American	15	2.0%
American Indian and Alaska Native	54	7.3%
Asian	4	0.5%
Native Hawaiian and Other Pacific Islander	0	0.0%
Some other race	5	0.7%
Two or more races	78	10.6%
Hispanic or Latino (of any race)	43	5.8%

=== 2010 census ===
As of the census of 2010, there were 697 people living in the town. The population density was 1,394 inhabitants per square mile (538/km^{2}). There were 337 housing units at an average density of 674 per square mile (260/km^{2}). The racial makeup of the town was 91.40% White, 4.50% Native American, 0.53% Asian, and 3.57% from two or more races. Hispanic or Latino of any race were 1.46% of the population.

There were 328 households, out of which 29.6% had children under the age of 18 living with them, 47.9% were married couples living together, 9.5% had a female householder with no husband present, and 37.5% were non-families. 34.5% of all households were made up of individuals, and 20.4% had someone living alone who was 65 years of age or older. The average household size was 2.30 and the average family size was 2.97.

In the town, the population was spread out, with 25.3% under the age of 18, 8.9% from 18 to 24, 25.4% from 25 to 44, 20.4% from 45 to 64, and 20.1% who were 65 years of age or older. The median age was 37 years. For every 100 females, there were 89.5 males. For every 100 females age 18 and over, there were 84.6 males.

The median income for a household in the town was $23,810, and the median income for a family was $25,000. Males had a median income of $22,083 versus $17,159 for females. The per capita income for the town was $12,486. About 13.8% of families and 14.7% of the population were below the poverty line, including 20.4% of those under age 18 and 15.5% of those age 65 or over.

=== Schools ===
There is one school system, Elmore City-Pernell public schools, which consists of Elmore City-Pernell Elementary and Elmore City-Pernell High School. Their school mascot is Bogey the Badger. The school colors are purple and white. There is also one cemetery, Elmore City Cemetery.

== Notable people ==
- Lisa (Watson) Whitman, Miss Rodeo USA 1989, Miss Teen USA 1985, and Maid of Cotton 1991
