= NRH =

NRH may refer to:

- Nodular regenerative hyperplasia, a liver condition
- North Richland Hills, Texas, U.S.
- MedStar National Rehabilitation Hospital, Washington, DC, U.S.
- Nutritional Rehabilitation Homes of the Nepal Youth Foundation
- nrh (trigraph), romanization for Hmong /ɳɖʱ/
- Norman Regional Hospital, or Norman Regional Health, a medical system in Norman, Oklahoma.

== See also ==
- NRHS (disambiguation)
