= Exitium =

US musical group

Exitium was an American grind band from Norman, Oklahoma, United States, formed in September 2001 by Kirk Kirkwood, Andy Beard, Justin Jones, Brandon Carrigan, and Brian Carrigan. They released two studio albums: Mechanical Expressions of Purpose in 2004 on Compulsive Blasphemer Records (now Debello Records), and Outsourcing Morality in 2006 on Deepsend Records. Justin resigned from the band in 2007.

Exitium played well over a hundred shows in the Midwest, including the Gathering of the Sick festival in 2006, and performed with many other international metal bands.

== History ==
Exitium was formed in September 2001 by Justin Jones, Kirk Kirkwood, Brian Carrigan (drums, formerly of Humanicide), Brandon Carrigan (vocals, formerly of Humanicide), and Andy Beard (bass, formerly of Biomass). A year of live performances was followed by the recording of a full-length album "Mechanical Expressions of Purpose" in July 2002 at Soundpaige studios in Norman, OK. The album was eventually released on Compulsive Blasphemer Records. The band then started writing and rehearsing material for their second full-length album, which became 'Outsourcing Morality'.

Exitium amassed an underground following with performances in neighboring states such as Kansas, Texas, New Mexico, Missouri and Colorado. Exitium entered the studio December 17 of 2004 to record their second full-length album with Kill the Client bassist James Delgado engineering the sessions in Garland, TX. Exitium's sophomore effort was received as much more diverse and technically adept work than the previous album.

After the album had been recorded, vocalist Brandon Carrigan left the band. He was replaced by guitarist Justin Jones who moved to vocals. Cody Stanley (guitar, formerly of Biomass) then filled Justin's spot. Outsourcing Morality was released on Deepsend Records June 20, 2006. Shortly after the album’s release, second guitarist Cody Stanley was fired from the group. In April 2007, the band underwent yet another line-up change when Brian Carrigan resigned from the group in order to form Nahurak. This left Kirk Kirkwood, and bassist Andy Beard to sign on session drummer Eric Park of ex-Devourment / Wrought of Obsidian to record a new full-length album tentatively titled "Grind After Death." After several years with no updates the album was seemingly abandoned with no official statement.

In June 2011, Kirk and Andy attempted to revamp the band once again, and reportedly hired Zach Mansur of Uranium Death Crow and Humanicide (OK) to play drums on a potential new album. Cody Stanley was reportedly brought back on as a second guitarist. Andy Beard was also reported to have stepped up to fill the empty vocal position. The new lineup attempted to reform and record, but the sessions were unsuccessful and the band eventually ceased with no official statement being released.

== Discography ==
=== Mechanical Expressions of Purpose ===
Between 2001 and 2002, the band wrote the material for Mechanical Expressions of Purpose. It was recorded at Sound Paige Studios in Norman, OK. The album mixes elements of crust-punk, grindcore, and Swedish death metal. The production is raw and grainy, with constant vocal changes and the short song-lengths typical of the genre. The lyrical content is diverse, including songs on population sustainability, cosmic apocalypse, the philosophy of military service, nightmares, the future of reason, and the hypocrisies of Christianity. One of the more popular songs on the album, “Decay of the Mind,” was based upon the experiences that vocalist Brandon Carrigan had while working in a retirement home. It was released on Compulsive Blasphemer Records in 2003, and featured art by Austin White and Robert Rogers. It was surprisingly well received by a diverse community of fans, as it was widely discussed on the Relapse Records message board.

=== Outsourcing Morality ===
In December 2004, the band recorded the album Outsourcing Morality in Garland, Texas. It was engineered by Kill the Client bassist, James Delgado, and mastered by Scott Hull of Pig Destroyer. It features guest vocals by “Champ” Morgan of Kill the Client, and art by Max Rodriguez and Kirk Kirkwood. It was released on Deepsend Records in 2006, and distributed internationally. This second album featured more complex songwriting and death metal influences. The guitar work had expanded its reach to include, for the first time, much more melodic movements, like “Only in Death” and “A Dying Act of Defiance.” The lyrical content was diverse and included songs about Wall Street corruption, existential philosophy, unethical corporate business practices, consumer culture, and the inherent worthlessness of human beings. It was unique in its ability to cross multiple genres, and was reviewed in publications such as Metal Edge and Terrorizer magazine. Online reviews were mixed, citing the short album length and raw production as disappointments, and several reviewers recommended it only to die-hard fans of the genre.

== Members ==
=== Former ===
- Brandon Carrigan - Vocals (2001–2005)
- Kirk Kirkwood - Guitars (2001–2007; 2011)
- Andy Beard - Bass, Vocals (2001–2007; 2011)
- Justin Jones - Guitar (2001–2005), Vocals (2005–2007) Died 2020
- Brian Carrigan - Drums (2001–2007)
- Cody Stanley - Guitar (2006; 2011)
- Zach Mansur - Drums (2011)
