= Norman, Oklahoma =

City in Oklahoma, US

- City
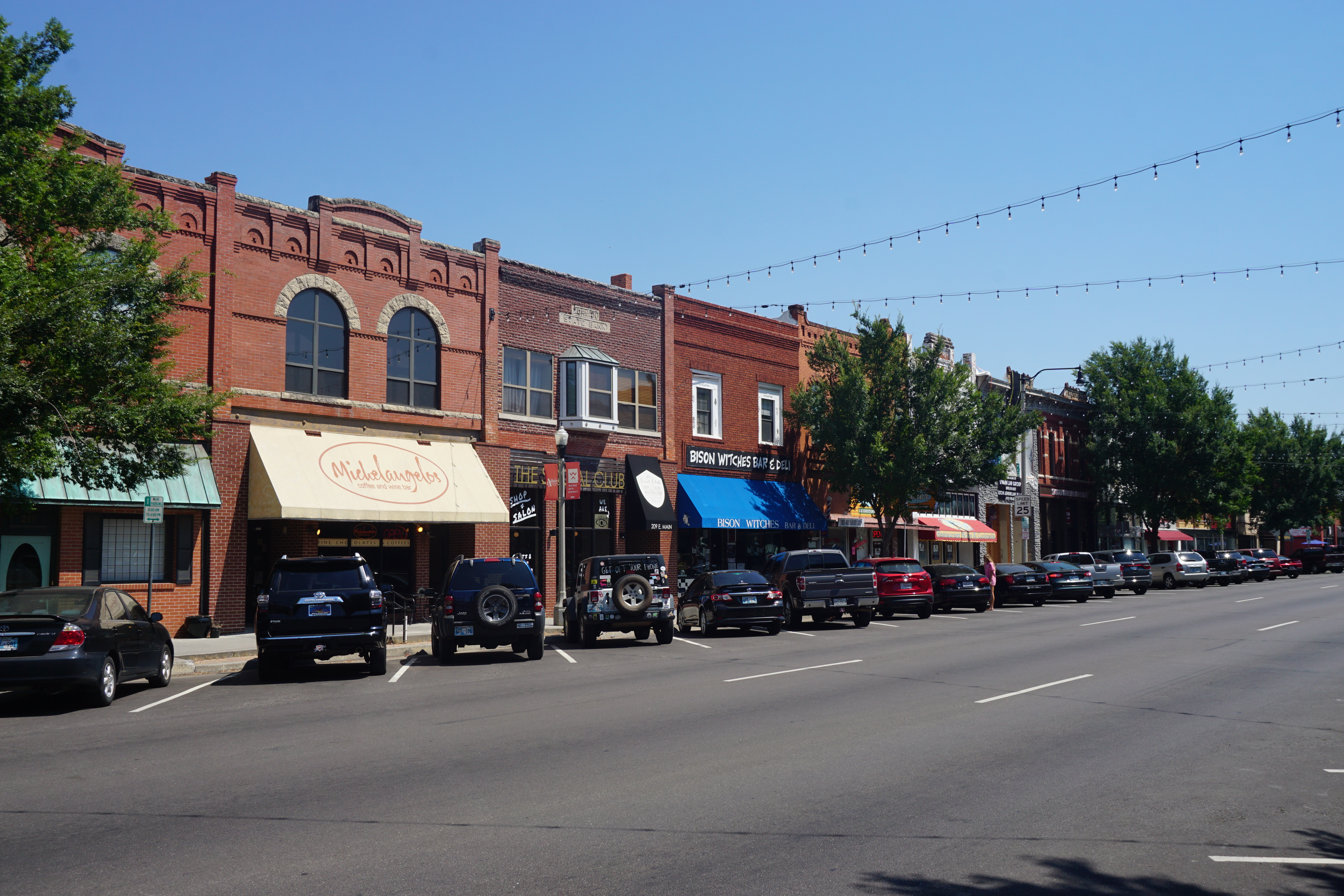
- Main Street (2019)

- Flag Seal
- Motto: "Building an Inclusive Community"
- Location of Norman in Cleveland County and Oklahoma

- Location in the United States
- Coordinates: 35°13′15″N 97°26′37″W
- Country: United States
- State: Oklahoma
- County: Cleveland
- Named for: Abner Ernest Norman

Government
  - Type: Council-manager
  - Mayor: Stephen Tyler Holman
  - City manager: Darrel Pyle

Area
  - City: 189.19 sq mi (490.00 km^{2})
  - Land: 178.65 sq mi (462.69 km^{2})
  - Water: 10.54 sq mi (27.31 km^{2})
- Elevation: 1,125 ft (343 m)

Population (2020)
  - City: 128,026
  - Rank: U.S.: 216th
  - Density: 717/sq mi (276.7/km^{2})
  - Urban: 120,191 (U.S.: 279th)
  - Metro: 1,425,695 (U.S.: 42nd)
- Demonym: Normanite
- Time zone: UTC−6 (Central (CST))
  - Summer (DST): UTC−5 (CDT)
- ZIP Codes: 73019, 73026, 73069–73072
- Area codes: 405/572
- FIPS code: 40-52500
- GNIS feature ID: 2411267
- Website: www.normanok.gov

Norman (/ˈnɔːrmən/) is the third-most populous city in the U.S. state of Oklahoma, with a population of 128,026 as of the 2020 census. It is the most populous city in and the county seat of Cleveland County and the second-most populous city in the Oklahoma City Metro Area after the state capital, Oklahoma City, 20 miles (32 kilometers) north of Norman.

The city was settled during the Land Run of 1889, which opened the former Unassigned Lands of Indian Territory to American pioneer settlement. It was named in honor of Abner Norman, the area's initial land surveyor, and was formally incorporated on May 13, 1891. Norman has prominent higher education and related research industries, as it is home to the University of Oklahoma, the largest university in the state, with nearly 32,000 students. The university is well known for its sporting events by teams under the banner of the nickname "Sooners", with over 85,000 people routinely attending football games. The university is home to several museums, including the Fred Jones Jr. Museum of Art, which contains the largest collection of French Impressionist art ever given to an American university, as well as the Sam Noble Oklahoma Museum of Natural History.

Norman's National Weather Center houses a unique collection of university, state, federal, and private-sector organizations that work together to improve the understanding of events related to the Earth's atmosphere. Norman lies within Tornado Alley, a geographic region colloquially known for frequent and intense tornadic activity. The Storm Prediction Center, a branch of the National Oceanic and Atmospheric Administration that delivers forecasts for severe thunderstorms, tornadoes, and other high-impact hazardous weather in the contiguous United States, is located at the National Weather Center. Additionally, research is conducted at the co-located National Severe Storms Laboratory, which operates various experimental weather radars and develops innovative tools, applications, and techniques aimed at improving forecasts and warnings of severe weather.

== History ==
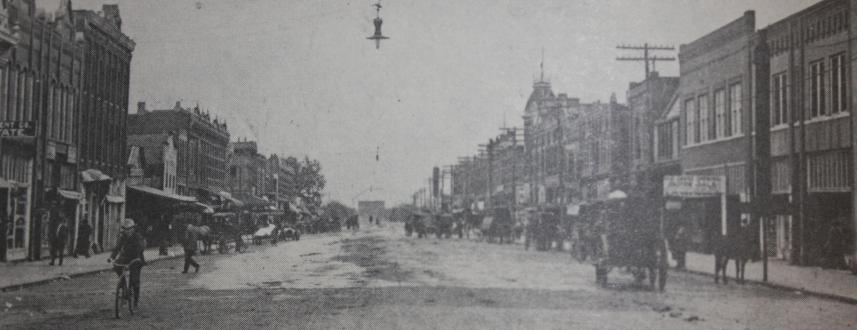
Main Street in Norman, circa 1900

The Oklahoma region became part of the United States with the Louisiana Purchase in 1803. Before the American Civil War, the U.S. government began relocating the Five Civilized Tribes—the five Native American tribes that the United States officially recognized via treaty—to Oklahoma. Treaties of 1832 and 1833 assigned the area known today as Norman to the Creek Nation.

After the Civil War, the Creeks were accused of aiding the Confederacy; as a result they ceded the region back to the United States in 1866. In the early 1870s, the federal government undertook a survey of these unassigned lands. Abner Ernest Norman, a 23-year-old surveyor from Kentucky, was hired to oversee part of this project. Norman's work crew set up camp near what is today the corner of Classen Boulevard and Lindsey Street; it was there that the men, perhaps jokingly, carved a sign on an elm tree that read "Norman's Camp," in honor of their young boss. In 1887, the Atchison, Topeka and Santa Fe Railway began service to the area, which was later opened to settlement as part of the Land Run of 1889; early settlers decided to keep the name "Norman."

On April 22, 1889, that first Land Run in what would become the state of Oklahoma saw the founding of Norman, with at least 150 residents spending the night in makeshift campsites, and by the next morning a downtown was already being constructed. Almost immediately two prominent Norman businessmen, former Purcell railroad freight agent Delbert Larsh and railroad station chief cashier Thomas Waggoner, began lobbying for the territorial government to locate its first university in Norman. The two were interested in growing the city and had reasoned that, rather than try to influence territorial lawmakers to locate the heavily contested territory capital in Norman, it made sense to attempt to secure the state's first university instead (a move that would be far less controversial). On December 19, 1890, Larsh and Waggoner were successful with the passage of Territorial Council Bill 114, establishing the University of Oklahoma in Norman about 17 years before Oklahoma statehood.

The City of Norman was formally incorporated on May 13, 1891.

The new Norman was a sundown town. African Americans were not allowed to live within the city limits or stay overnight until the early 1960s, nor could they study at the University of Oklahoma. In 2020, the Norman City Council issued an apology.

Norman has grown throughout the decades. By 1902 the downtown district contained two banks, two hotels, a flour mill, and other businesses; by 1913 over 3,700 people lived in Norman when the Oklahoma Railway Company decided to extend its interurban streetcar running from Oklahoma City to Moore into Norman, spurring additional population growth. The rail lines eventually transitioned to freight during the 1940s as the United States Numbered Highway system developed. The population reached 11,429 in 1940.

With the completion of Interstate 35 in June 1959, Norman found its role as a bedroom community to Oklahoma City increasing rapidly; in 1960 Norman's population was 33,412 but by the end of the decade had grown to 52,117. Throughout the 1960s Norman's land mass increased by 174 sq mi (450 km^{2}) by annexing surrounding areas. The city's growth trends have continued early in the 21st century, with the population reaching 95,694 in 2000, 110,925 in 2010, and 128,026 in 2020.

=== Military in Norman ===
In 1941, the University of Oklahoma and Norman city officials established Max Westheimer Field, a university airstrip, and then leased it to the U.S. Navy as a Naval Flight Training Center in 1942. It became the Naval Air Station Norman, and it was used for training combat pilots during World War II. A second training center, known as Naval Air Technical Training Center, and a naval hospital were later established to the south. In the years following World War II the airstrip was transferred back to the university's control. Today the airstrip is called the University of Oklahoma Westheimer Airport. Following the war the remaining military presence and post-war veterans who came to Norman to get an education again grew the city's population, which was 27,006 by 1950. The Navy again utilized the bases in a lesser capacity from 1952 to 1959 in support of the Korean War effort.

== Geography ==
As of 2010, the city has a total area of 189.42 sq mi (490.6 km^{2}), of which 178.77 sq mi (463.0 km^{2}) is land and 10.65 sq mi (27.6 km^{2}) is water.

The center of this large incorporated area is 20 mi (30 km) from the center of Oklahoma City, and separated primarily by Moore, is in the Oklahoma City metropolitan area.

=== Topography ===
Norman and the surrounding areas are mostly flat with an elevation near 1,171 ft (357 m). The terrain in the western section of Norman is prairie, while the eastern section, including the area surrounding Lake Thunderbird, consists of some 6,000 acres (24 km^{2}) of lakes and Cross Timbers forest.

=== Neighborhoods ===
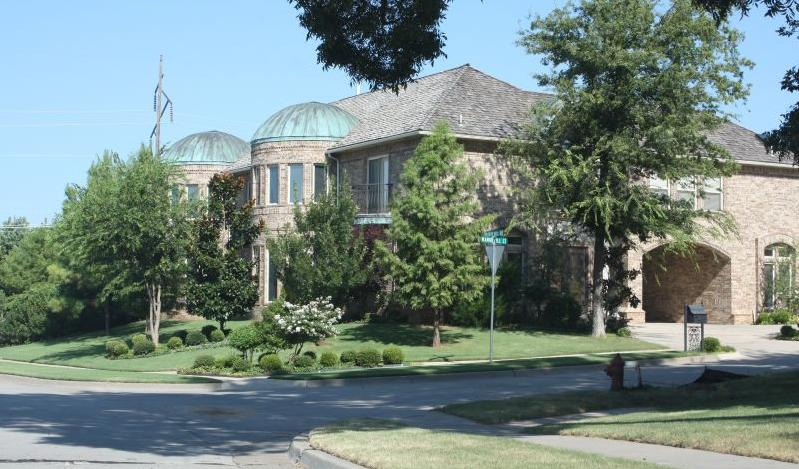
A neighborhood in west Norman

==== Downtown ====
Downtown Norman is an area of approximately 2 sq mi (5 km^{2}) bounded by University Blvd., Symmes St., Porter Ave., and Daws St.; primary streets include Main St. and Gray St. The area consists of restaurants, art galleries, and other businesses; it is home to some of the oldest buildings in Oklahoma.

==== Hall Park ====
Hall Park is an area northeast of downtown Norman that was initially an independent township; in 2005, it was annexed into Norman, becoming one of its neighborhoods. The area is home to many middle-class suburban homes and is historically significant in that it was advertised as the United States' first "all-electric town." President Ronald Reagan, then an executive with General Electric, attended Hall Park's grand opening ceremonies in 1962, where he was named the town's honorary first mayor.

==== OU Campus ====
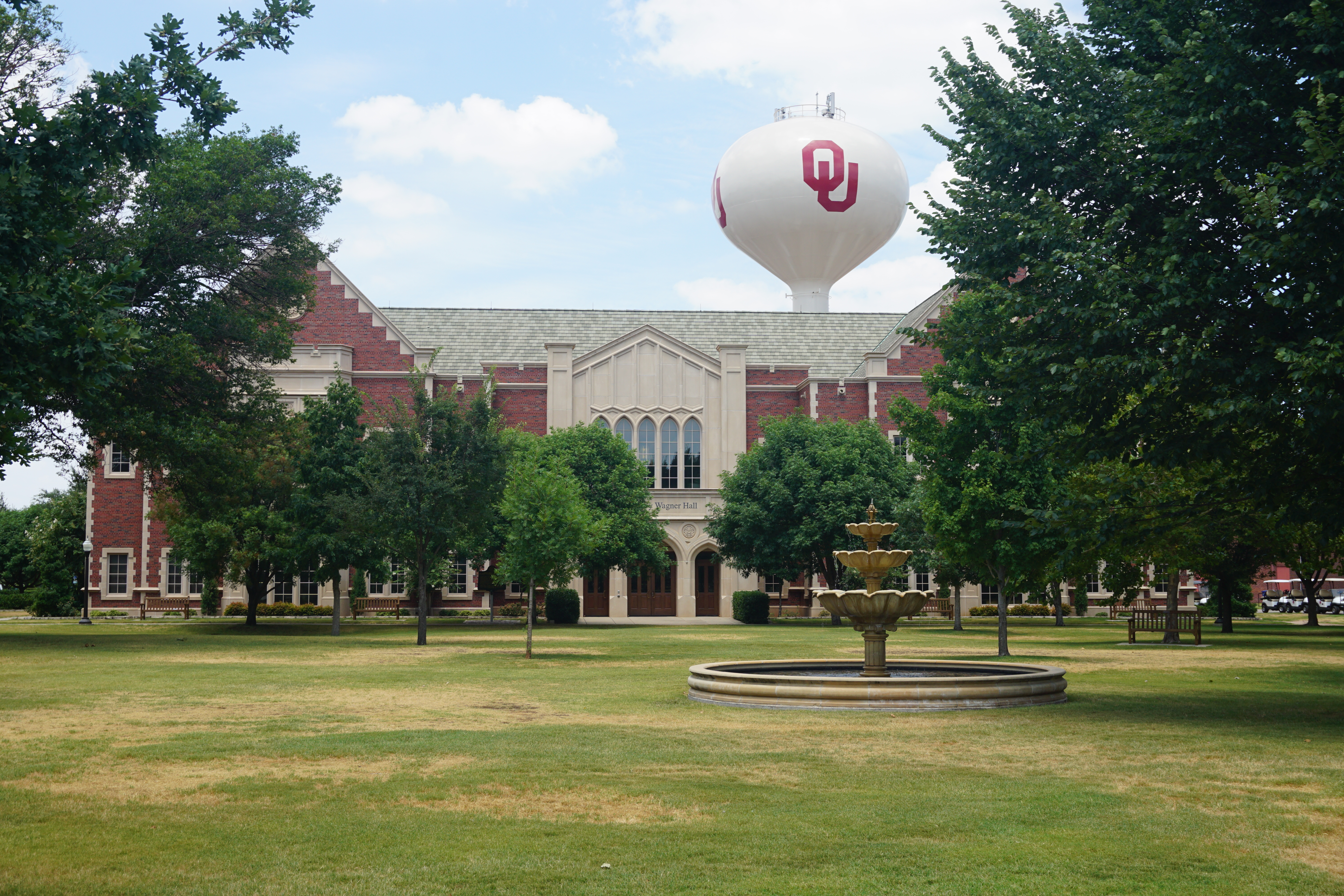
Lissa and Cy Wagner Hall on the campus of the University of Oklahoma in Norman

The University of Oklahoma and the area surrounding it are home to many historically significant neighborhoods. The university itself has a unique Gothic-inspired architecture known as "Cherokee Gothic," so named by architect Frank Lloyd Wright. Churches and houses in the surrounding neighborhoods can be described as neo-Gothic or Queen Anne in style.

==== Miller & Chautauqua Historic Districts ====
Norman has two city-designated historic preservation districts in the area: the Miller Historic District, bounded by Symmes St., Classen Blvd., and Miller Ave.; and the Chautauqua Historic District, bounded by Symmes St., Brooks St., Chautauqua Ave., and Lahoma Ave. Both of these residential neighborhoods contain houses designed from a mixture of architectural styles dating from 1903 to 1935, with the majority of the Miller neighborhood being of the Bungalow or American Craftsman style homes. Any external changes or repairs to homes in these areas must be approved by the Norman Historic Preservation Commission.

==== Old Silk Stocking ====
Old Silk Stocking, a row along Peters Ave. between Frank St. and Beal St., was a prominent upscale residential neighborhood in the early 1900s. It was the first exclusively wealthy neighborhood in the city and is named after such affluence. Many of the houses reflect the Victorian architecture of the time.

==== Campus Corner ====
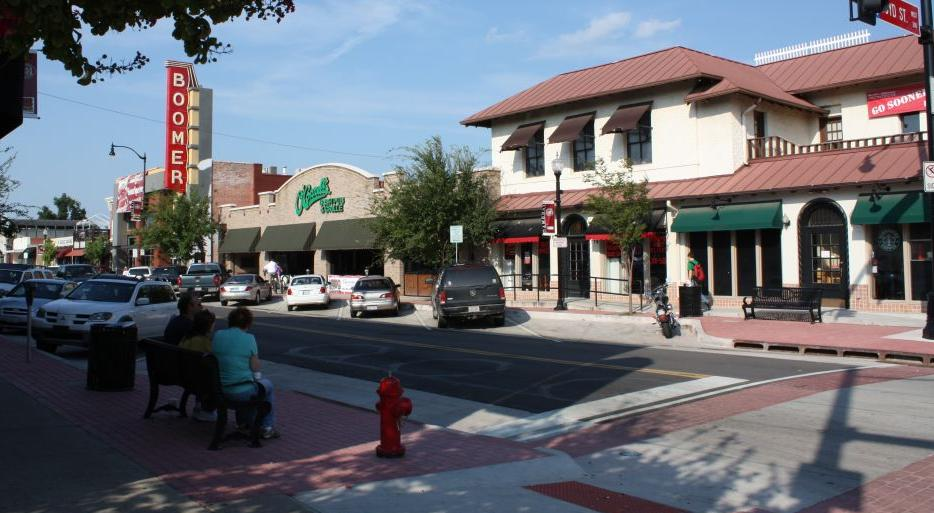
Campus Corner near Boyd and Asp

Historic Campus Corner, the area immediately north of the university, contains a mixture of businesses, bars, and restaurants. The neighborhoods to the east of the campus are home to many students, both in residential housing and high-rise condos/apartments.

=== Climate ===
Climate data for Norman 1991–2020 normals, extremes 1894–present (Note: For more information on the location of the site, see Threadex.)
Month	Jan	Feb	Mar	Apr	May	Jun	Jul	Aug	Sep	Oct	Nov	Dec	Year
Record high °F (°C)	81 (27)	90 (32)	97 (36)	99 (37)	102 (39)	109 (43)	112 (44)	116 (47)	107 (42)	100 (38)	91 (33)	86 (30)	116 (47)
Mean daily maximum °F (°C)	49.9 (9.9)	54.4 (12.4)	63.2 (17.3)	71.4 (21.9)	78.8 (26.0)	87.2 (30.7)	92.5 (33.6)	92.1 (33.4)	84.2 (29.0)	73.7 (23.2)	61.8 (16.6)	51.6 (10.9)	71.7 (22.1)
Daily mean °F (°C)	38.8 (3.8)	42.9 (6.1)	51.5 (10.8)	59.8 (15.4)	68.6 (20.3)	77.3 (25.2)	81.8 (27.7)	81.2 (27.3)	73.2 (22.9)	62.0 (16.7)	50.3 (10.2)	41.1 (5.1)	60.7 (15.9)
Mean daily minimum °F (°C)	27.7 (−2.4)	31.3 (−0.4)	39.8 (4.3)	48.2 (9.0)	58.4 (14.7)	67.3 (19.6)	71.2 (21.8)	70.2 (21.2)	62.2 (16.8)	50.3 (10.2)	38.8 (3.8)	30.6 (−0.8)	49.7 (9.8)
Record low °F (°C)	−9 (−23)	−17 (−27)	1 (−17)	20 (−7)	28 (−2)	43 (6)	52 (11)	47 (8)	32 (0)	10 (−12)	5 (−15)	−3 (−19)	−17 (−27)
Average precipitation inches (mm)	1.37 (35)	1.60 (41)	2.80 (71)	3.48 (88)	5.14 (131)	4.79 (122)	3.71 (94)	3.61 (92)	3.68 (93)	3.43 (87)	2.04 (52)	2.00 (51)	37.65 (956)
Average snowfall inches (cm)	1.2 (3.0)	1.2 (3.0)	0.2 (0.51)	0 (0)	0 (0)	0 (0)	0 (0)	0 (0)	0 (0)	0 (0)	0.5 (1.3)	1.0 (2.5)	4.1 (10)
Average precipitation days (≥ 0.01 in)	5.2	5.8	7.4	8.0	10.4	9.2	6.3	7.0	7.4	7.2	5.6	5.9	85.4
Average snowy days (≥ 0.1 in)	0.9	1.3	0.3	0	0	0	0	0	0	0	0.2	1.2	4.0
Source: NOAA

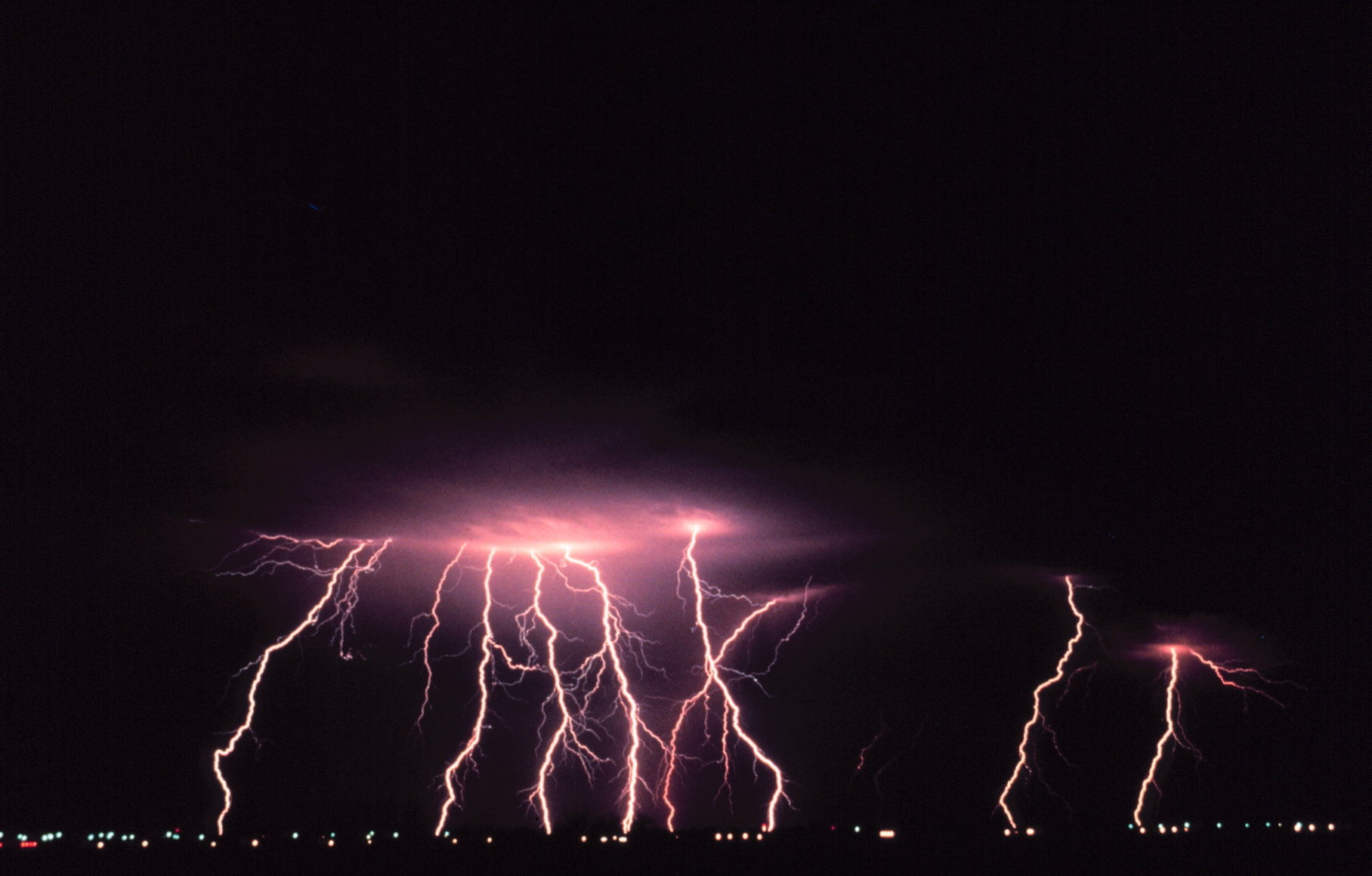
Lightning strikes Norman during a nighttime thunderstorm

Norman falls within a temperate, humid subtropical climate region that is identified as "Cfa" class on the Köppen climate classification. On average Norman receives about 38 in (970 mm) of precipitation per year; May and June are the wettest months. Temperatures average 61 °F (16 °C) for the year. Average daytime highs range from 50 °F (10 °C) in January to 92.5 °F (33.6 °C) in July; average lows range from around 28 °F (−2 °C) in January to 71 °F (22 °C) in July. While Summers generally range from warm to hot, with moderate to often high humidity, some summers can be very hot, as was evident in the historically hot summers of 1980 and 2011, when temperatures climbed above 100 °F (38 °C) over most days from mid-June through early September in those years. Consistent winds, averaging near 10 mph (16 km/h) and usually from the south to southeast, help to temper hotter weather during the summer but intensify cold periods during the winter.

The average growing season in Norman is 209 days, but plants that can withstand short periods of colder temperatures may have an additional three to six weeks. Winter months tend to be cloudier than those in summer, with the percentage of possible sunshine ranging from an average of about 55% in winter to nearly 80% in summer.

Norman lies within an area colloquially referred to as "Tornado Alley", a region of the United States known for frequent tornadic activity, and the Oklahoma City metropolitan area, which encompasses Norman, is known for being one of the more tornado-prone areas in the United States. The risk for tornadoes is greatest in the springtime months of March through June when the majority of all reported tornadoes occur. Severe weather, including tornadoes, still occurs outside this range. Notably, a high-end EF2 tornado tore through the southeastern side of Norman on the night of February 26, 2023, passing within a mile of the NWC. There have been several other tornado events in recent years. On May 10, 2010, numerous tornadoes occurred in Cleveland County, resulting in the loss of multiple homes and businesses within Norman city limits. Weak tornadoes also struck Norman on April 13, 2012 and May 6, 2015.

== Demographics ==
Historical population
Census	Pop.	Note	%±
1890	787		—
1900	2,225		182.7%
1910	3,724		67.4%
1920	5,004		34.4%
1930	9,603		91.9%
1940	11,429		19.0%
1950	27,006		136.3%
1960	33,412		23.7%
1970	52,117		56.0%
1980	68,020		30.5%
1990	80,071		17.7%
2000	95,694		19.5%
2010	110,925		15.9%
2020	128,026		15.4%
2024 (est.)	131,010		2.3%
U.S. Decennial Census

=== Racial and ethnic composition ===
Norman, Oklahoma – Racial and ethnic composition Note: the US Census treats Hispanic/Latino as an ethnic category. This table excludes Latinos from the racial categories and assigns them to a separate category. Hispanics/Latinos may be of any race.
Race / Ethnicity (NH = Non-Hispanic)	Pop 2000	Pop 2010	Pop 2020	% 2000	% 2010	% 2020
White (NH)	76,852	84,384	86,007	80.31%	76.07%	67.18%
Black or African American (NH)	4,022	4,674	6,176	4.20%	4.21%	4.82%
Native American or Alaska Native (NH)	4,139	5,027	5,246	4.33%	4.53%	4.10%
Asian (NH)	3,321	4,211	5,028	3.47%	3.80%	3.93%
Pacific Islander or Native Hawaiian (NH)	44	74	98	0.05%	0.07%	0.08%
Some other race (NH)	97	148	1,263	0.10%	0.13%	0.99%
Mixed race or Multiracial (NH)	3,496	5,325	12,381	3.65%	4.80%	9.67%
Hispanic or Latino (any race)	3,723	7,082	11,827	3.89%	6.38%	9.24%
Total	95,694	110,925	128,026	100.00%	100.00%	100.00%

=== 2020 census ===
As of the 2020 census, Norman had a population of 128,026. The median age was 31.5 years. 19.7% of residents were under the age of 18 and 13.9% of residents were 65 years of age or older. For every 100 females there were 98.2 males, and for every 100 females age 18 and over there were 96.0 males age 18 and over.

89.3% of residents lived in urban areas, while 10.7% lived in rural areas.

There were 50,642 households in Norman, of which 26.9% had children under the age of 18 living in them. Of all households, 40.5% were married-couple households, 22.9% were households with a male householder and no spouse or partner present, and 29.9% were households with a female householder and no spouse or partner present. About 32.2% of all households were made up of individuals and 10.0% had someone living alone who was 65 years of age or older.

There were 55,694 housing units, of which 9.1% were vacant. Among occupied housing units, 51.4% were owner-occupied and 48.6% were renter-occupied. The homeowner vacancy rate was 2.1% and the rental vacancy rate was 10.2%.

Racial composition as of the 2020 census
Race	Percent
White	69.7%
Black or African American	5.0%
American Indian and Alaska Native	4.4%
Asian	4.0%
Native Hawaiian and Other Pacific Islander	0.1%
Some other race	4.2%
Two or more races	12.6%
Hispanic or Latino (of any race)	9.2%

=== 2010 census ===
As of the census of 2010, there were 110,925 people, 44,661 households, and 24,913 families residing within the city. By population, Norman was the third-largest city in Oklahoma and the 225th-largest city in the United States. The population density was 616 inhabitants per square mile (238/km^{2}). The racial makeup of the city was 84.7% White, 4.3% African American, 4.7% Native American, 3.8% Asian, 0.1% Pacific Islander, 1.9% from other races, and 5.5% from two or more races. Hispanic or Latino of any race were 6.4% of the population.

Of the 44,661 households, 25.0% had children under the age of 18, 41.5% were married couples living together, 10.1% had a female householder with no husband present, and 44.2% were non-families. Individuals living alone made up 30.7% of all households; 7.3% had someone living alone who was 65 years of age or older. The average household size was 2.33 and the average family size was 2.94.

The age distribution was 5.8% under the age of 5, 5.7% from 5 to 9, 5.2% from 10 to 14, 8.9% from 15 to 19, 16.0% from 20 to 24, 9.0% from 25 to 29, 6.6% from 30 to 34, 5.6% from 35 to 39, 5.3% from 40 to 44, 5.9% from 45 to 49, 5.9% from 50 to 54, 5.4% from 55 to 59, 4.6% from 60 to 64, 3.2% from 65 to 69, 2.3% from 70 to 74, 1.8% from 75 to 79, 1.4% from 80 to 84, and 1.3% over 85 years of age. The median age was 29.6 years. Males made up 49.7% of the population while females made up 50.3%.

The median household income in the city was $44,396, and the median income for a family was $62,826. Males had a median income of $41,859 versus $35,777 for females. The per capita income for the city was $24,586. About 11.8% of families and 19.2% of the population were below the poverty line, including 18.9% of those under age 18 and 8.9% of those age 65 or over.

Although religious information is not collected by the U.S. census, according to a 2000 survey by Dale E. Jones of the Association of Statisticians of American Religious Bodies, 50.2% of the population in Norman is affiliated with a religious institution. Of those 43.6% were Southern Baptist, 15.0% Catholic Church, 13.0% United Methodist, 3.3% Assembly of God, 2.8% Churches of Christ, 2.1% Latter-day Saint (Mormon), 2.1% Christian Churches and Churches of Christ, 1.9% Disciples of Christ, 1.7% Presbyterian Church, and 14.6% other Christian denominations or religions.

== Economy ==
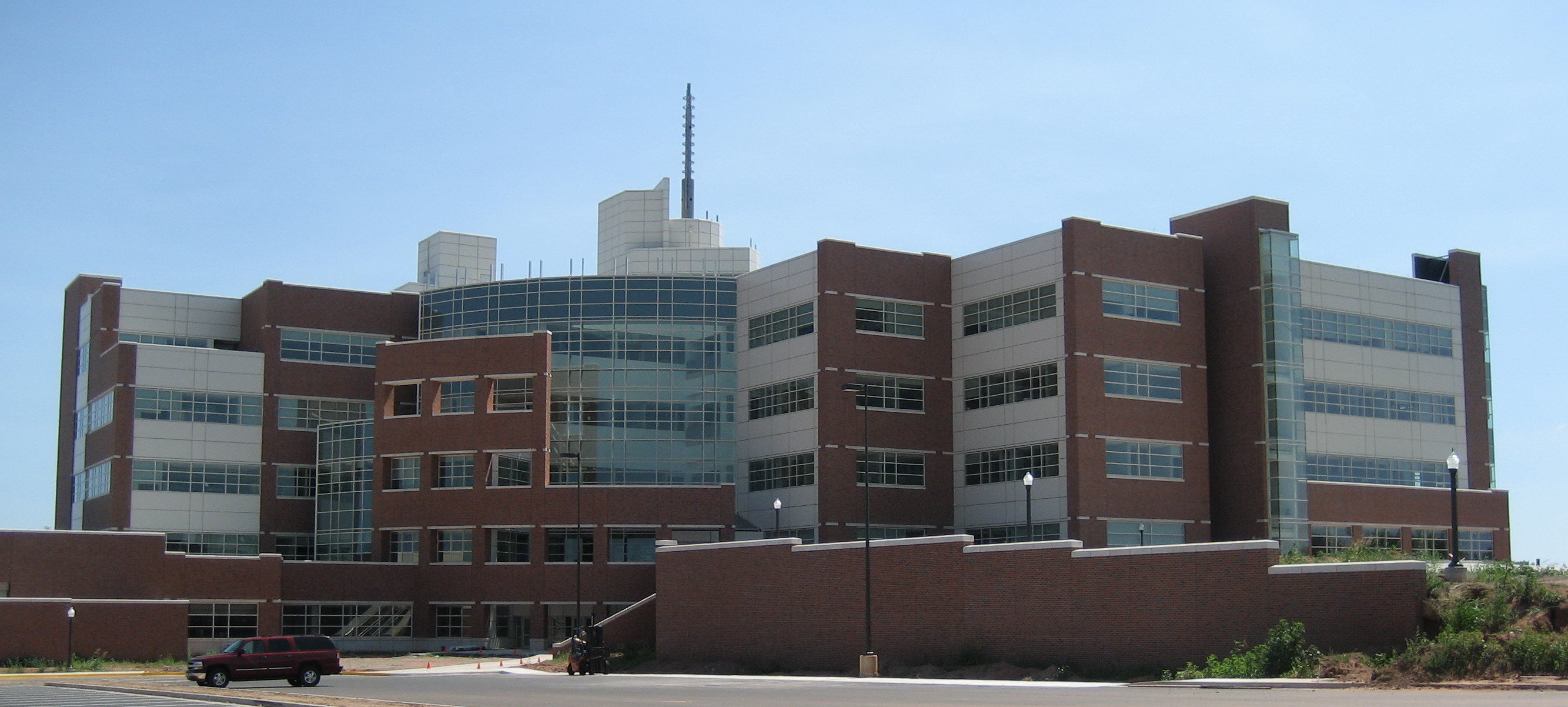
National Weather Center at the University of Oklahoma

The University of Oklahoma employs over 11,600 personnel across three campuses, making it a significant driver of Norman's economy. The campus is a center for scientific and technological research, having contributed over $277 million to such programs in 2009.

Norman is also home of the National Weather Center, a cooperative research effort between the University of Oklahoma and the National Oceanic and Atmospheric Administration that houses a number of weather- and climate-related organizations; the city is also the location of the National Weather Museum & Science Center. As a result of this ongoing academic and public weather research, several private meteorological businesses are present in the city, including Weathernews Americas, Inc., Vieux and Associates, Inc., Verisk Analytics, Pivotal Weather, and DTN (formerly Weather Decision Technologies).

In addition to weather, Norman is a center for other scientific ventures, public and private. The Oklahoma Geological Survey, which conducts geological research, and the Oklahoma Renewable Energy Council, which is a public-private alliance that fosters renewable energy technology with the aim of establishing more viable applications, make the city their home. Southwest NanoTechnologies is a producer of single-walled carbon nanotubes. Bergey Windpower is a supplier of small wind turbines.

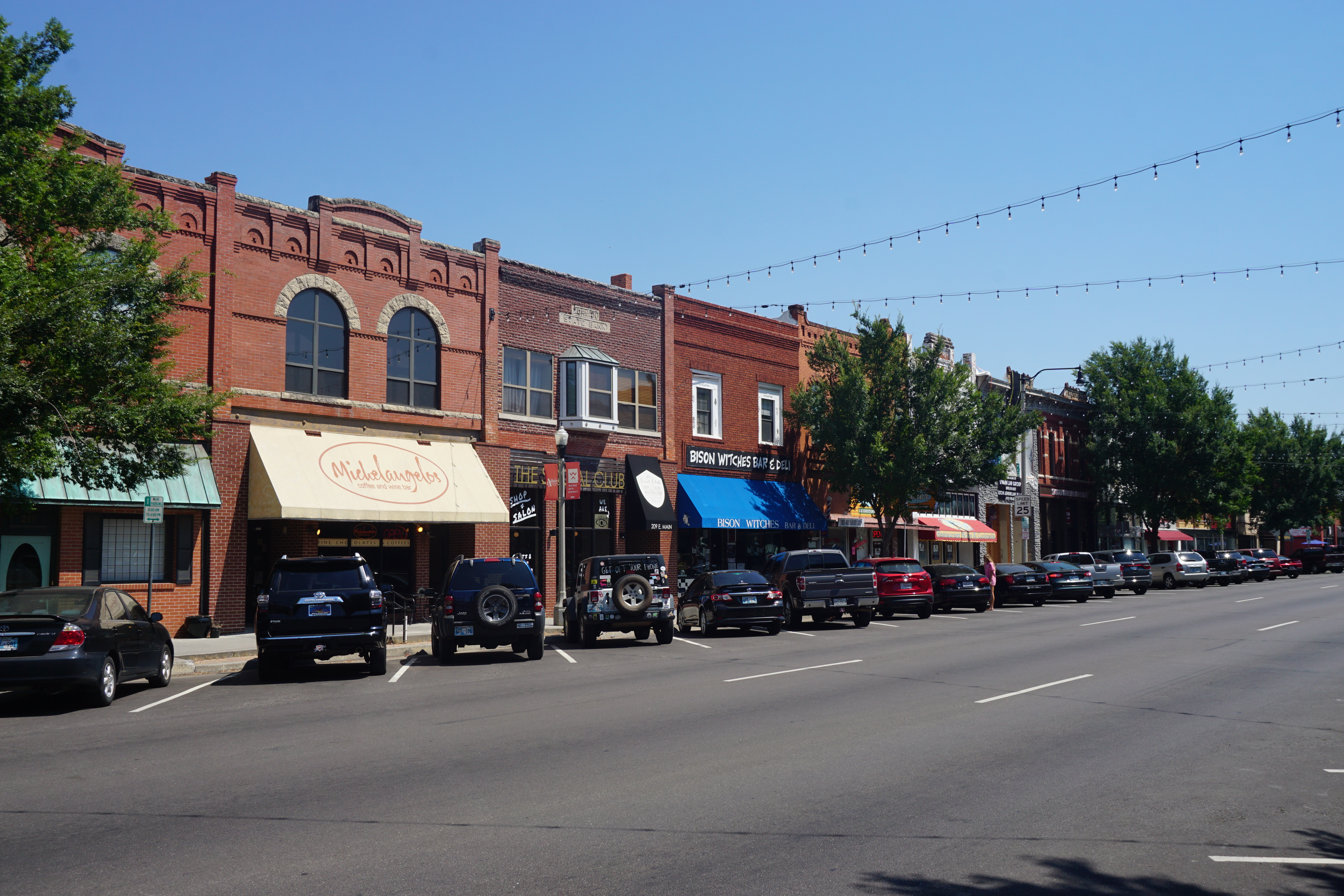
Main Street in downtown Norman

Other major employers in the city include Norman Regional Health System, Norman Public Schools, Bosch, Griffin Memorial Hospital, Hitachi, Avara Pharmaceutical Services, Albon Engineering, Xyant Technology, MSCI, SITEL, the United States Postal Service National Center for Employee Development, Sysco Corporation, and AT&T.

=== Fair trade ===
In 2010, Norman became the 17th city in the United States to adopt a council resolution giving it status as a Fair Trade Town. The resolution states that the city of Norman supports the purchasing of goods from the local community; when goods cannot be purchased locally the city will support buying from producers abroad who meet Fair Trade standards. These standards include supporting quality of life in developing countries and planning for environmental sustainability.

=== Top employers ===
According to the Norman's 2022 Comprehensive Annual Financial Report, the top employers in the city are:

#	Employer	# of employees
1	University of Oklahoma	11,085
2	Norman Regional Hospital	3,040
3	Norman Public Schools	1,923
4	Bosch	1,030
5	Walmart	950
6	City of Norman	896
7	Hitachi	400
8	NOAA	400
9	Cleveland County	396
10	Target	380

== Arts and culture ==
=== Museums and theater ===
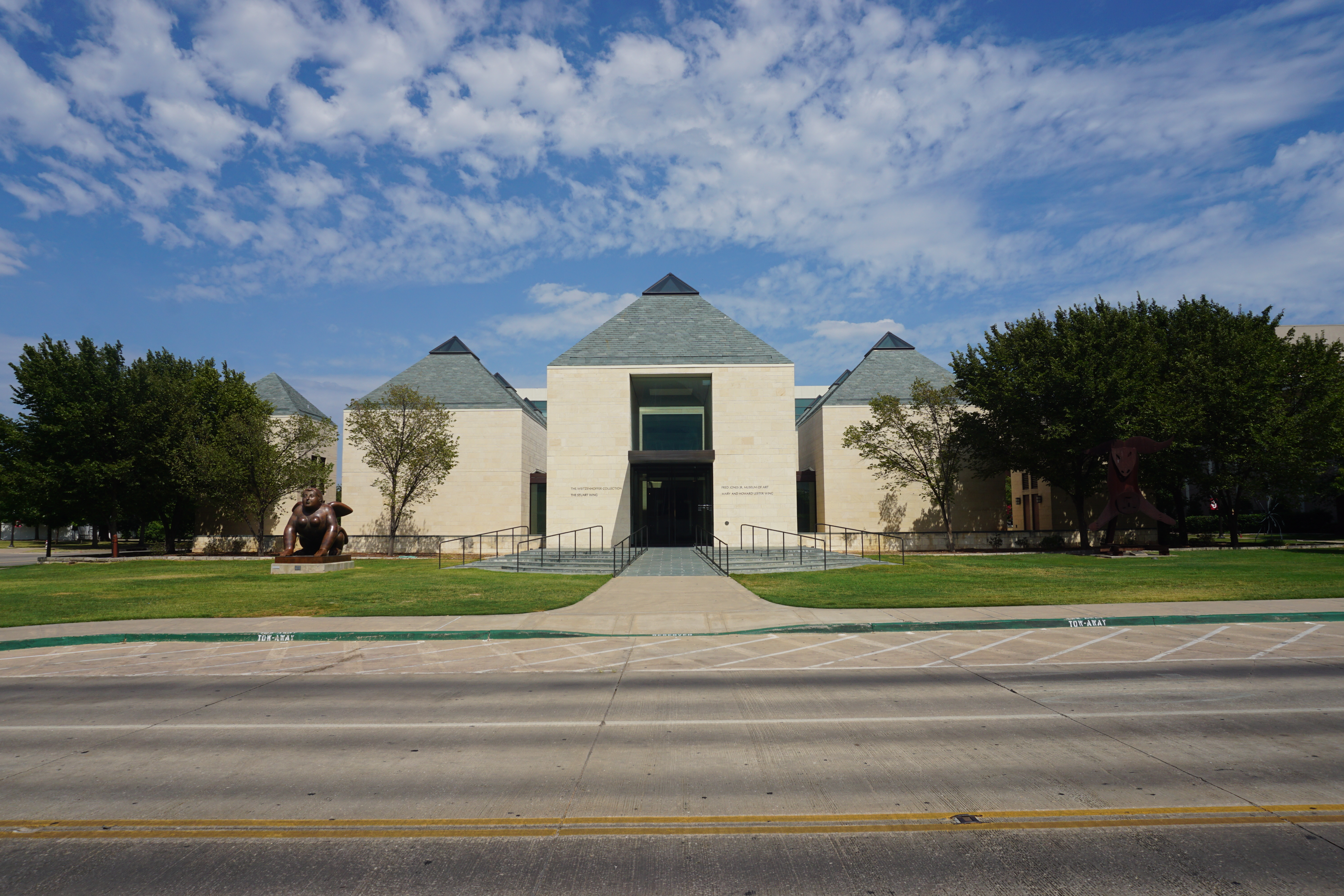
Fred Jones Jr. Museum of Art

Norman enjoys many cultural attractions that are funded by the university. The Fred Jones Jr. Museum of Art made national and international news in 2000 when it was given the Weitzenhoffer Collection, the largest collection of French Impressionist art ever given to an American university. The collection includes works by Mary Cassatt, Claude Monet, Vincent van Gogh, Paul Gauguin, Pierre-Auguste Renoir, and Camille Pissarro.

The Sam Noble Oklahoma Museum of Natural History is a museum containing over 50,000 sq ft (5,000 m^{2}) of exhibits ranging from archaeology, paleontology, ethnology, herpetology, ornithology, and Native American studies. Its exhibits are intended to immerse visitors in the state's long history. The museum features many complete collections of dinosaur fossils and is also noted for its Paleozoic collection, considered to be one of the largest and most important in existence.

The Moore-Lindsay House is a Queen Anne-style home built prior to 1900 by prominent Norman home builder William Moore; it was purchased by the city of Norman in 1973 and today serves as the city and Cleveland County's historical museum. Located at 508 N. Peters, the Moore-Lindsay House's architecture is representative of Norman during the Victorian era. The Cleveland County Historical Society maintains a collection of over 5,000 rare books, documents, and other artifacts in its archives located inside the house.

Catlett Music Center at the University of Oklahoma features many orchestral and jazz performances and the Weitzenhoffer Family College of Fine Arts' Schools of Dance, Drama, and Musical Theatre offer many student programs throughout the year.

The city is also home to many privately funded galleries and performance sites.

The city is the place of origin of the band Exitium.

=== Community events ===
Norman hosts many free festivals and community events that occur throughout the year.

The Norman Medieval Fair is a celebration of medieval-themed games, art, and culture, with highlights of jousting, human chessmatch combats & other combat shows, and several musical & dance acts. The event is typically held during the last weekend of March or first weekend of April in Reaves Park, near the university. It has been held annually in Norman since 1976 and was originally a forum for the English Department at the University of Oklahoma. It is the largest weekend event held in the state of Oklahoma, with over 325,000 people in attendance in 2006 and growing yearly. Events Media Network has named Medieval Fair one of the top 100 events in the United States.

Norman Music Festival is an annual weekend music festival held in April in downtown Norman. Established in 2008, the event had over 26,000 people in attendance during the 2009 festival. Originally a one-day event, the festival has quickly grown so large that it is now an all-weekend concert series. The festival highlights both local musicians and internationally acclaimed artists and features many forms and styles of music.

Groovefest is a music festival hosted annually at Andrews Park. On the last Sunday in September, the music festival is held to help raise awareness about human rights. The event was established in 1986 by the University of Oklahoma chapter of Amnesty International.

The Chocolate Festival, the only fundraiser of the year for the city's Firehouse Arts Center, was ranked No. 3 for food festivals across America by the Food Network. This festival offers various chocolate tasting sessions, chocolate art competitions and exhibits, chocolate dessert competitions and more. It has been an annual tradition since 1983.

The National Weather Festival takes place at the National Weather Service every fall, featuring food trucks, weather balloon launches, educational booths, and meet-and-greets with local meteorologists.

Jazz in June is a music festival held the last full weekend in June at various venues across Norman. The festival features both jazz and blues musical performances as well as jazz educational clinics taught by professional musicians appearing in the festival and post-concert jam sessions at local venues which bring headliners and local artists together. Jazz in June, one of the major cultural events in the state as well as the City of Norman, attracts a combined concert audience of 50,000 drawn from throughout the state, region and nation. Another 100,000 or more enjoy these same performances through post-festival broadcasts on KGOU Public Radio as well as other public radio stations throughout the state, region and nation.

May Fair is an arts festival held every year during the first weekend in May at Andrews Park. It features top area performers, fine art, crafts, and food.

Summer Breeze Concert Series is a series of concerts held from Spring to Fall at various park venues across Norman. The series is sponsored by the Performing Arts Studio.

Midsummer Nights' Fair is a nighttime arts festival held during two evenings in June. The fair features art, music, and food and is held outside the Firehouse Art Center located in Lions Park.

The Norman Mardi Gras parade is a celebration of Mardi Gras occurring on the Saturday closest to Fat Tuesday. The parade is held in downtown Norman and features themed costumes and floats.

The Main Street Christmas Holiday Parade is a celebration of Christmas and the holiday season held every December in downtown Norman. The parade features holiday-themed costumes and floats.

=== Libraries ===
Norman is served by three public libraries, Norman Public Library Central, Norman Public Library East, and Norman Public Library West, all of which are part of the 12-branch Pioneer Library System which serves the entirety of Cleveland County, McClain County and Pottawatomie County in Central Oklahoma. The library has a reciprocal agreement with the Metropolitan Library System of Oklahoma City through which those eligible for a library card in one system are also eligible in the other. Cardholders are also able to borrow books unavailable in the PLS collection through the use of Interlibrary Loan. Books can be reserved and shipped to a local library free of charge. In addition to books, the library maintains a collection of periodicals, DVD videos, audio books, e-books and research materials.

The Bizzell Memorial Library at the University of Oklahoma is the largest library in the state of Oklahoma, containing more than five million volumes. In addition to books, the library maintains over 17,000 ft (5,200 m) in length of manuscripts and archives, 1.6 million photographs, and more than 1.5 million maps. The library also houses more than 50 books printed before the year 1500.

== Sports ==
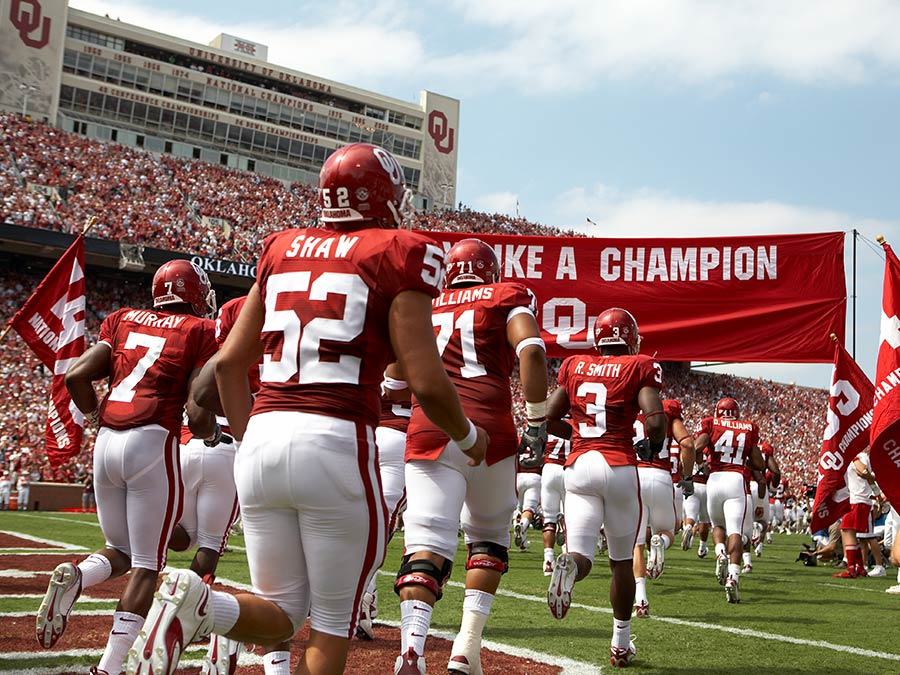
OU takes the field at Oklahoma Memorial Stadium.

The University of Oklahoma sponsors many collegiate sporting events in Norman. The school is well known for its football program, having won seven NCAA Division I National Football Championships. In addition, it has the best winning percentage of any Division I FBS team since the introduction of the AP Poll in 1936 and has played in four BCS National Championship Games since 1998.

During football season, the Oklahoma Sooners football program contributes significantly to Norman's economy. During game day weekends, Norman sees an influx out of town traffic from all over the country with over 80,000 people routinely attending football games. Norman's local businesses, especially areas around campus and Campus Corner, benefit greatly from the game day traffic alone. The program ranks in the top 10 of ESPN's top college football money-makers with home games generating revenues at approximately $59 million and game day operating expenses at about $6.1 million.

In 1951 and 1994 its baseball team won the NCAA national championship, and the women's softball team won the national championship in 2000, 2013, 2016, 2017, 2021, 2022, 2023, and 2024. The men's and women's gymnastics teams have won ten national championships since 2001.

Other university men's sports include: basketball, cross country, golf, gymnastics, football, tennis, track and field, and wrestling. The OU Sooners men's hockey team competes in the American College Hockey Association, at the "club" level, but has yet to apply for higher-level play. Due to the lack of a rink in Norman, the team plays at Arctic Edge Ice Arena in Edmond. Women's sports include: basketball, cross country, golf, gymnastics, football, rowing, soccer, softball, tennis, track and field, and volleyball.

The Golf Coaches Association of America (GCAA), a non-profit professional association of men's collegiate golf coaches, is located in Norman.

== Parks and recreation ==
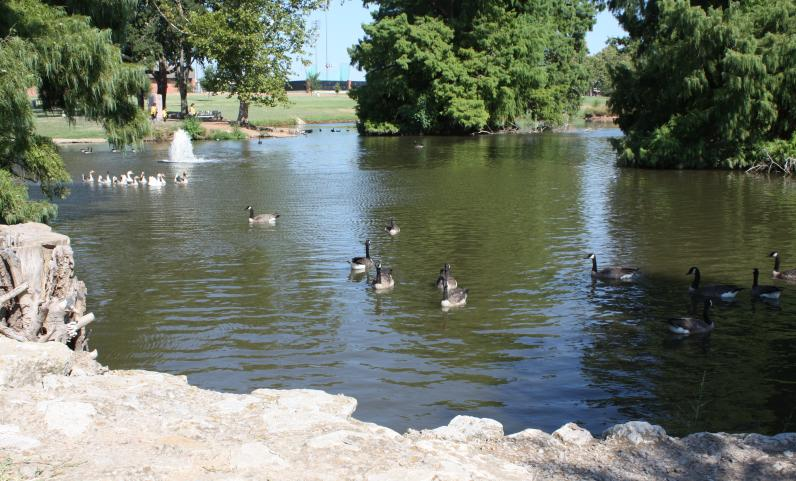
Brandt Park, "The Duck Pond"

Norman's Parks and Recreation Department facilitates 55 neighborhood and community parks, three recreation centers, a golf course and driving range, three disc golf courses, a complete swim complex with waterslides, a wading pool, 32 tennis courts, and three special services centers (that offer cultural arts and senior citizen activities). Griffin Community Park Sports Complex includes 16 soccer fields, 14 baseball/softball fields, and four football fields.

Norman enjoys many tree-lined landscapes, participating in the ReLeaf Norman and Tree City USA programs.

== Government ==
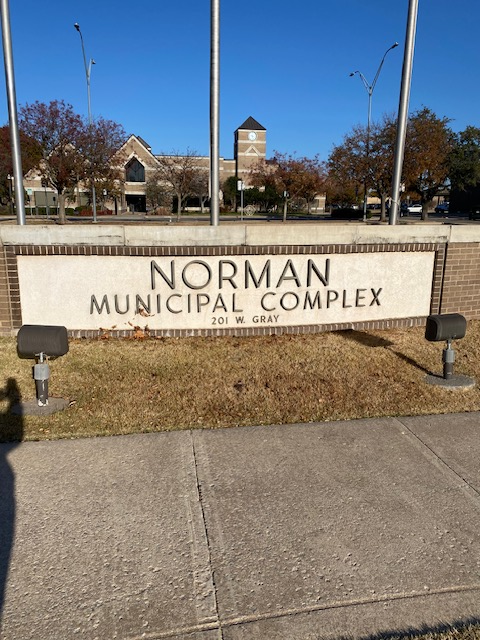
City Office Buildings

A council-manager government has been in place in Norman since the adoption of its city charter on June 28, 1919. A councilor from each of the city's eight council wards is elected to office every two years, each serving a two-year term. Councilors are elected from their own respective wards based on a plurality voting system; a councilor from each ward serves on the Norman City Council. A mayor is elected by the entire voting population of Norman and serves as an at-large councilor; the mayor serves a three-year term. As a whole, the council acts as the legislative body of city government; it aims to pass laws, approve the city budget, and manage efficiency in the government. The City Council appoints a professional City Manager who is responsible for the city's day-to-day administrative activities. As of 2024, the City of Norman has over 850 employees working in 11 departments that help oversee and implement the city's policies and services. The City Council meets biweekly in City Hall, at 201 W. Gray Street; various boards and commissions meet in accordance with their own schedules. The mayor is Larry Heikkila (elected in 2022), and the city manager is Darrel Pyle (appointed in 2019). In accordance with the charter of the city of Norman, all city elected positions are nonpartisan.

List of mayors of Norman
- Thomas B. Wagoner, circa 1889
- Pryor Adkins, circa 1894
- ?
- N.E. Sharp, circa 1912
- ?
- T. Jack Foster, circa 1929
- ?
- Al Fuzzell, circa 1952–1953
- H. W. Masters, circa 1954
- Jack Milton, circa 1955
- James F. Long, circa 1956
- June Tompkins Benson, 1957–1960
- Earl Sneed 1960–1965
- William S. Morgan, circa 1967
- Gordon D. Masters 1969–1972
- Bill Nations, 1992–1998
- Bob Thompson, 1998–2001
- Ron Henderson, 2001–2004
- Harold Haralson, circa 2005
- Cindy Simon Rosenthal, circa 2007–2016
- Lynne Miller, 2016–2019
- Breea Clark, 2019–2022
- Larry Heikkila, 2022–present
- Stephen Tyler Holman, mayor-elect

Municipal and state laws are enforced by the Norman Police Department. The police department consists of up to 171 commissioned officers and 71 office employees and is Oklahoma's third-largest police department.

The city serves as the county seat of Cleveland County.

== Education ==
=== Higher education ===
==== Colleges and universities ====
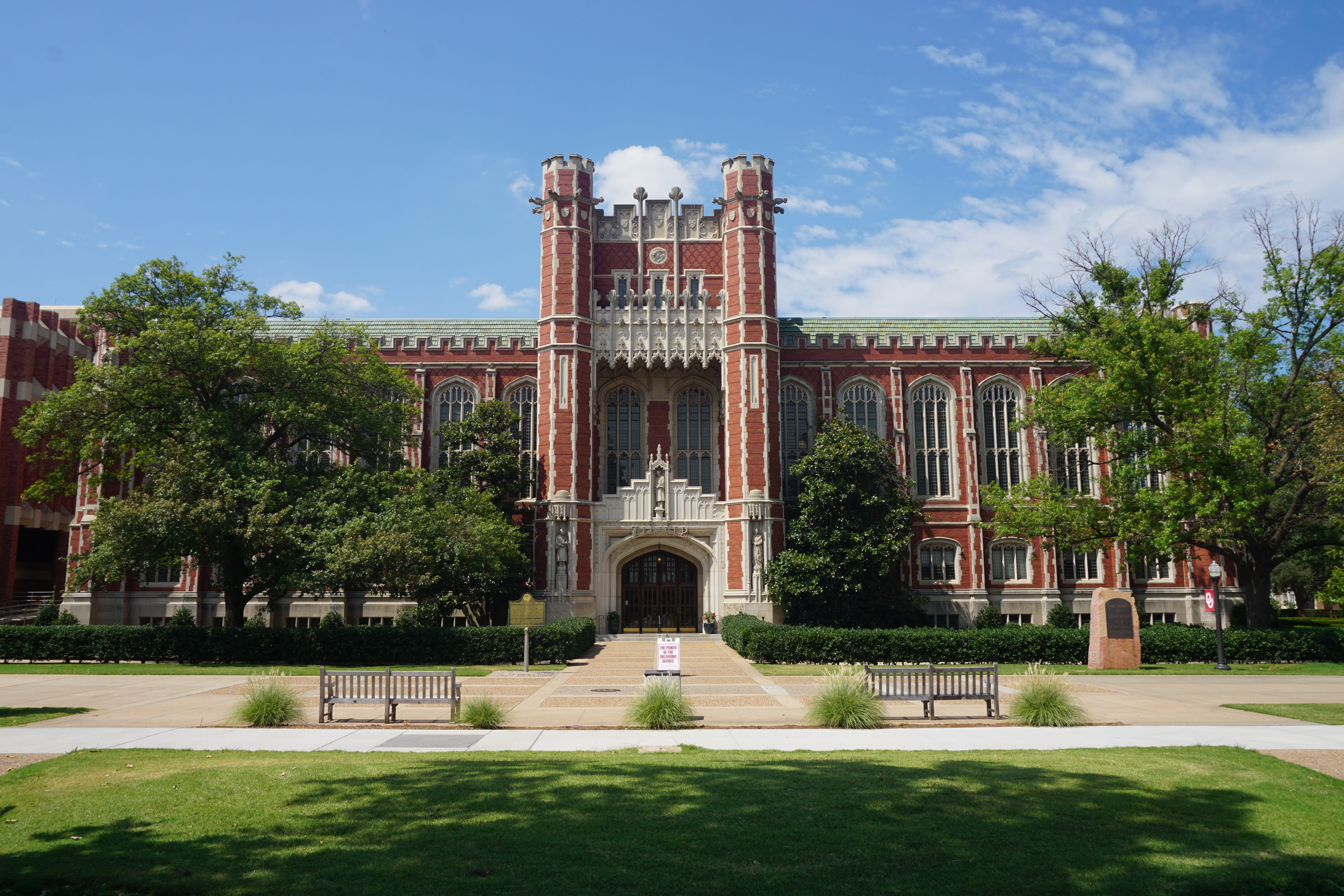
Bizzell Memorial Library, University of Oklahoma

The University of Oklahoma is the largest university in the state of Oklahoma, with approximately 30,000 students enrolled. The university was founded in 1890, prior to Oklahoma statehood. The university includes Norman, Oklahoma City and, Tulsa campuses with the main campus located in Norman. In 2007, The Princeton Review named the University of Oklahoma one of its "Best Value" colleges. The school is ranked first per capita among public universities in enrollment of National Merit Scholars and has seen 28 Rhodes Scholars graduate since the program's inception in 1902. PC Magazine and the Princeton Review rated it one of the "20 Most Wired Colleges" in both 2006 and 2008, while the Carnegie Foundation classifies it as a research university with "highest research activity."

The school is well known for its athletic programs, having won many distinctions and awards including seven NCAA Division I National Football Championships.

==== CareerTech ====
The city of Norman is served by the Moore Norman Technology Center. The school was established in 1972 and has been awarded the Oklahoma Association of Technology Center's Gold Star School Award on multiple occasions. The Franklin Road Campus consists of six buildings totaling 323,500 sq ft (30,100 m^{2}) of classroom, meeting, and office space. The school has a full-time staff of 207.

=== Primary and secondary schools ===
==== Public schools ====
Public school districts in Oklahoma are independent of other local governments. Several districts overlap the municipal boundaries of the City of Norman.

Norman Public Schools is the largest district serving Norman; there are 15 elementary schools, four middle schools, and two high schools in the district. More than 17,000 students are enrolled in the district, making it one of the largest in the state.

Noble Public Schools is a school district that serves southeastern portions of Norman, the adjoining cities of Noble and Slaughterville, and other parts of Cleveland County. It consists of two elementary schools, an intermediate school, a middle school, and a high school.

Little Axe Public Schools serves the eastern area of Norman. It consists of an elementary, junior, and high school.

Other school districts with territory within the city are McLoud, Mid-Del, Moore, and Robin Hill.

==== Private schools ====
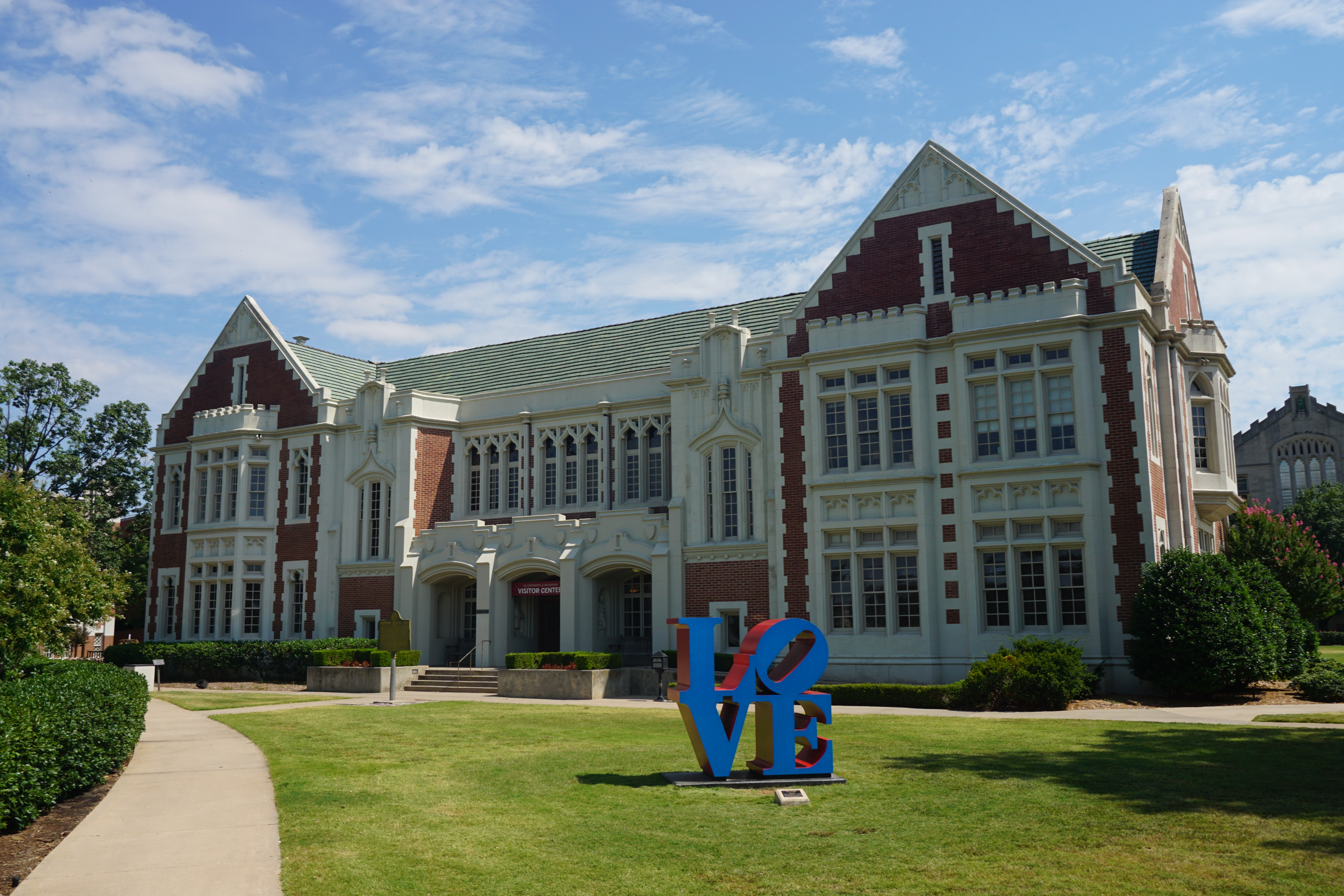
Visitor Center, University of Oklahoma

Several private schools also serve the area:

- All Saints Catholic School (Roman Catholic Archdiocese of Oklahoma City) – pre-kindergarten through 8th grade
- Blue Eagle Christian Academy – kindergarten through 10th grade
- Community Christian School – kindergarten through 12th grade
- Norman Christian Academy – pre-kindergarten through 7th grade
- Robinson Street Academy – kindergarten through 12th grade
- Rose Rock School – pre-kindergarten through kindergarten
- Terra Verde Discovery School – kindergarten through 5th grade
- Trinity Lutheran School – pre-kindergarten through 6th grade
- Veritas Classical Christian Academy – pre-kindergarten through 12th grade

== Media ==
The Norman Transcript is the most widely circulated Norman-based newspaper in the city. It is a daily newspaper covering events in Cleveland and McClain counties. It is the oldest continuous business in Norman and was founded shortly after the Land Run of April 1889 on July 13, 1889.

The Oklahoma Daily is a student-run newspaper at the University of Oklahoma. It was first published in 1897, several years after the university's founding. The paper has received numerous awards for journalism excellence including the Associated Collegiate Press' Pacemaker Award.

KGOU is a full-service public radio station licensed to the University of Oklahoma. The station serves Norman and the greater Oklahoma City metropolitan area with a news/talk/jazz format, using programs from National Public Radio, Public Radio International, and others.

Norman TV is a government-access television station airing on Cox Communications cable television channel 20. It broadcasts programming provided by the City of Norman, including video from city council meetings.

== Infrastructure ==
=== Transportation ===
==== Airports ====
Scheduled air transport, major commercial air transportation is available at Will Rogers World Airport in Oklahoma City, located approximately 20 mi (30 km) northwest of Norman. The airport serves more than 3.78 million passengers per year.

Norman is served locally by Max Westheimer Airport, a general aviation airport run by the University of Oklahoma. The airport is one of only two airports in the Oklahoma City metropolitan area designated as a reliever airport to Will Rogers World Airport. Max Westheimer Airport is capable of handling aircraft up through and including executive class jet aircraft.

==== Public transit ====
EMBARK provides fare-free bus and paratransit service throughout the 191 sq mi (490 km^{2}) Norman area, as well as express service to Downtown Oklahoma City and the Social Security Administration offices in Moore.

Campus Area Rapid Transit (CART), operated by the University of Oklahoma, provides free transportation around the campus to students.

Norman On-Demand, a microtransit service operated by Via Transportation, provides on-demand service in parts of western Norman through a phone app.

==== Rail ====
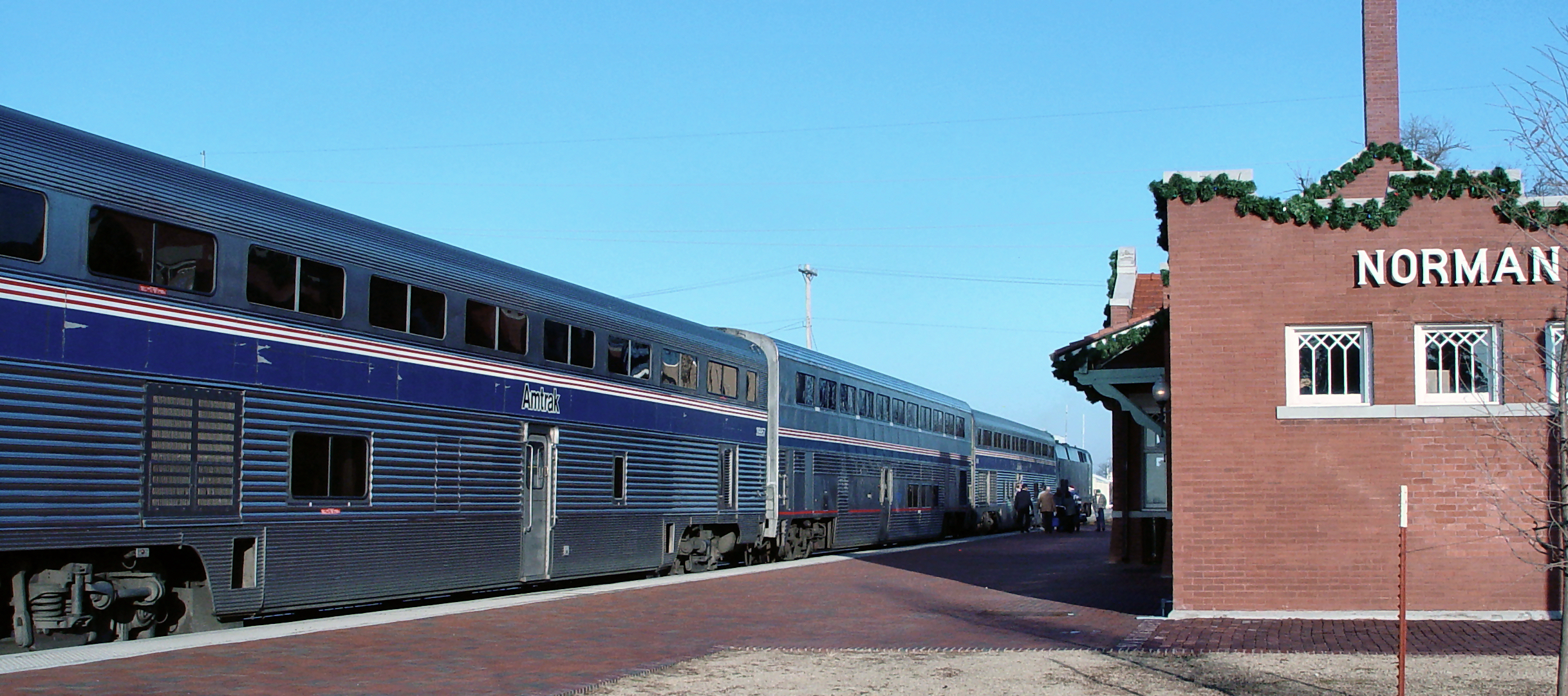
Amtrak train stopping in Norman

Inter-city passenger train service is available via Amtrak at Norman Depot. Amtrak's Heartland Flyer provides daily round trip service to downtown Oklahoma City and Fort Worth, Texas.

Although Norman currently has no light rail or commuter rail service, there is growing interest in incorporating such services into the city's future transportation plans as part of the Oklahoma City metro area's regional transit system.

==== Roads and highways ====
The predominant form of transportation in Norman is roads and highways with 80.0% of all residents driving alone to work, 9.0% carpooling, and just 1.3% taking public transportation. As of 2007, Interstate 35 alone was handling over 99,000 vehicles per day. Other major highways include SH 9, a portion of which serves 28,000 vehicles per day, and US 77, which serves more than 25,000 vehicles per day.

Norman is served by two major federal highways:

- I-35
- US 77

Norman is served by two major Oklahoma state highways:

- SH 9
- SH 77H

=== Utilities ===
Electric utility companies servicing Norman include Oklahoma Gas & Electric, which is headquartered in Oklahoma City, and Oklahoma Electric Cooperative (a utility cooperative). Natural gas is provided by Oklahoma Natural Gas. The city's Utility Department offers water, wastewater, and recycling services to parts of the city as well as solid waste pickup citywide.

==== Drinking water quality ====
In 2010, drinking water in Normal was identified as levels of hexavalent chromium 3 and 6 near the higher end of the acceptable EPA limit. The Garber-Wellington Aquifer, which is known to have elevated levels of heavy metals, was identified as a possible source. Norman's water supply has also been noted for excessive levels of arsenic. The city responded by building new wells and removing old ones.

=== Healthcare ===
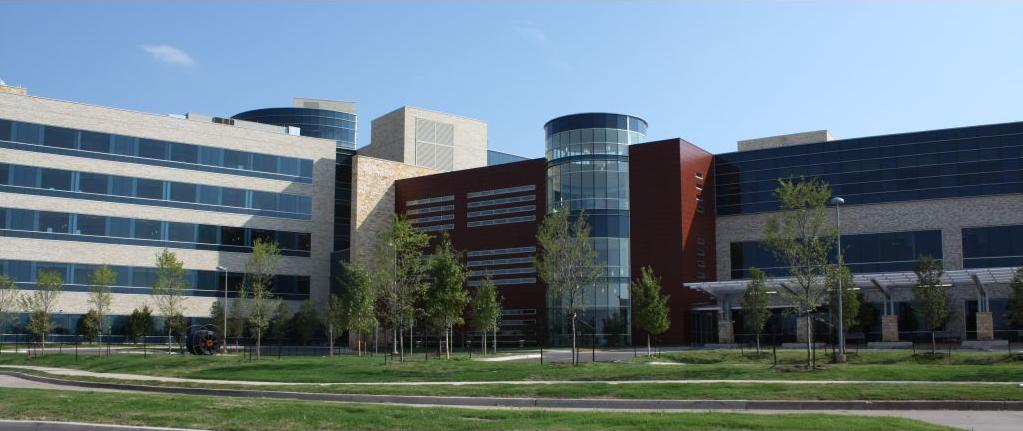
Norman Regional HealthPlex

Norman Regional Health System is a multi-campus system that provides medical services in Norman and throughout south central Oklahoma. Its Porter Avenue campus, located north of downtown Norman, is a 337-bed general hospital providing a wide range of services including acute care. In October 2009, the Norman Regional HealthPlex campus opened in west Norman. It provides a 152-bed facility specializing in cardiology, cardiovascular services, as well as women's and children's services.

== Twin towns – sister cities ==
In accordance with Sister Cities International, an organization that began under President Dwight Eisenhower in 1956, Norman has been given four international sister cities in an attempt to foster cross-cultural understanding:

- Arezzo, Tuscany, Italy
- Clermont-Ferrand, Puy-de-Dôme, France
- Colima, Col., Mexico
- Seika, Kyoto, Japan

== See also ==
- List of sundown towns in the United States
