= Campus Corner =

Commercial district in Norman, Oklahoma

Coordinates: 35.2117°N 97.4443°W

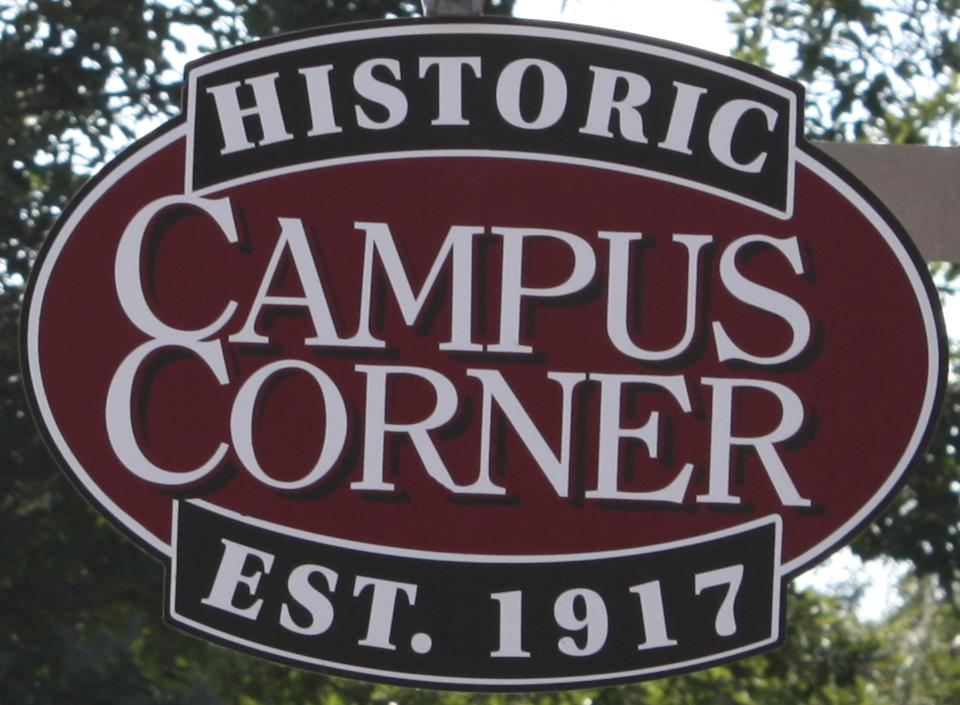
- "Historic Campus Corner" Marker
- Interactive map of Campus Corner
- Length: 0.5 mi (0.80 km)
- Northwest end: White St. and University Blvd.
- Southeast end: Boyd St. and Asp Ave.

Campus Corner is a college-oriented commercial district in Norman, Oklahoma located directly north of the University of Oklahoma campus. The area is bounded by White Street, University Boulevard, Boyd Street, and Asp Avenue. The district is home to four blocks of unique retail shopping and mixed-use development, including restaurants, bars, clothing stores, OU memorabilia, personal care, and other businesses and professional organizations. Established in 1917, the area around Boyd Street and Asp Avenue has long been a focal for OU pep rallies and other displays of school spirit.

== History ==
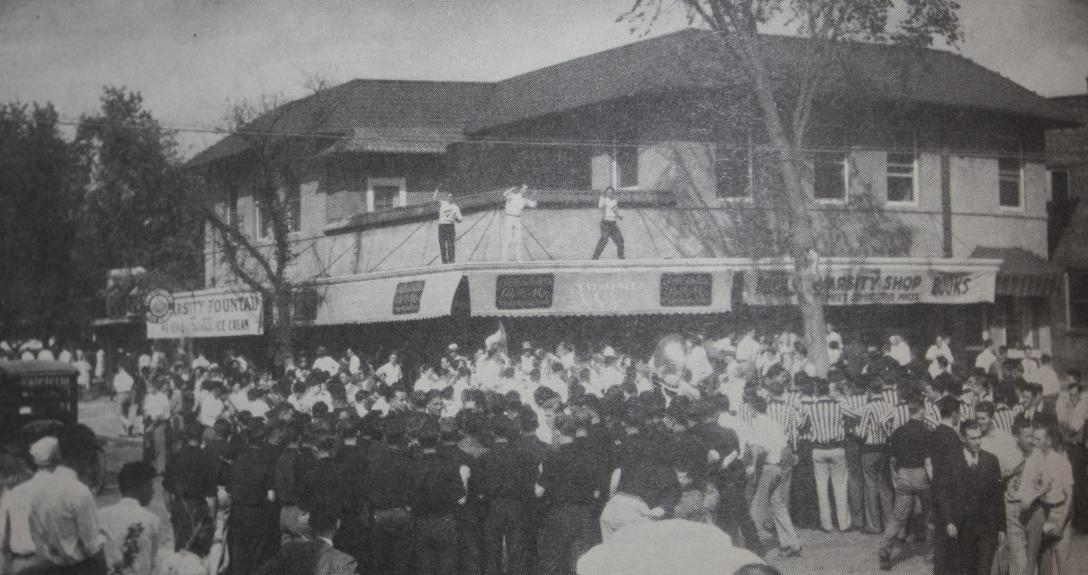
Campus Corner near Boyd and Asp, circa 1920

Campus Corner was developed during the early 1900s to serve the needs of the faculty and students working at and living nearby the University of Oklahoma. Nearly all student housing was located in the Campus Corner area and at the time students were not permitted to drive. This caused the area to grow rapidly, becoming a thriving business district by 1920. Restaurants, clothing stores, laundry facilities, pharmacies, and beauty salons soon opened for business. One of the early developers in Campus Corner was the Whistler Family, responsible for additions to the area such as the 575 University building which ultimately housed a bookstore, supply shop, restaurant, and a dance floor. In 1929 a tragic fire destroyed most of the then-existing Campus Corner; however, within a few years the area was rebuilt and the fire ultimately led to further expansion.

Throughout the 1930s the area continued to grow with the addition of new restaurants, cleaners, and a department store. In 1947 the Boomer Theater was constructed at 765 Asp Avenue. Originally a movie theater, in its later years the Boomer Theater became a concert venue before finally being remodeled for use as a department store/office space during the 1980s.

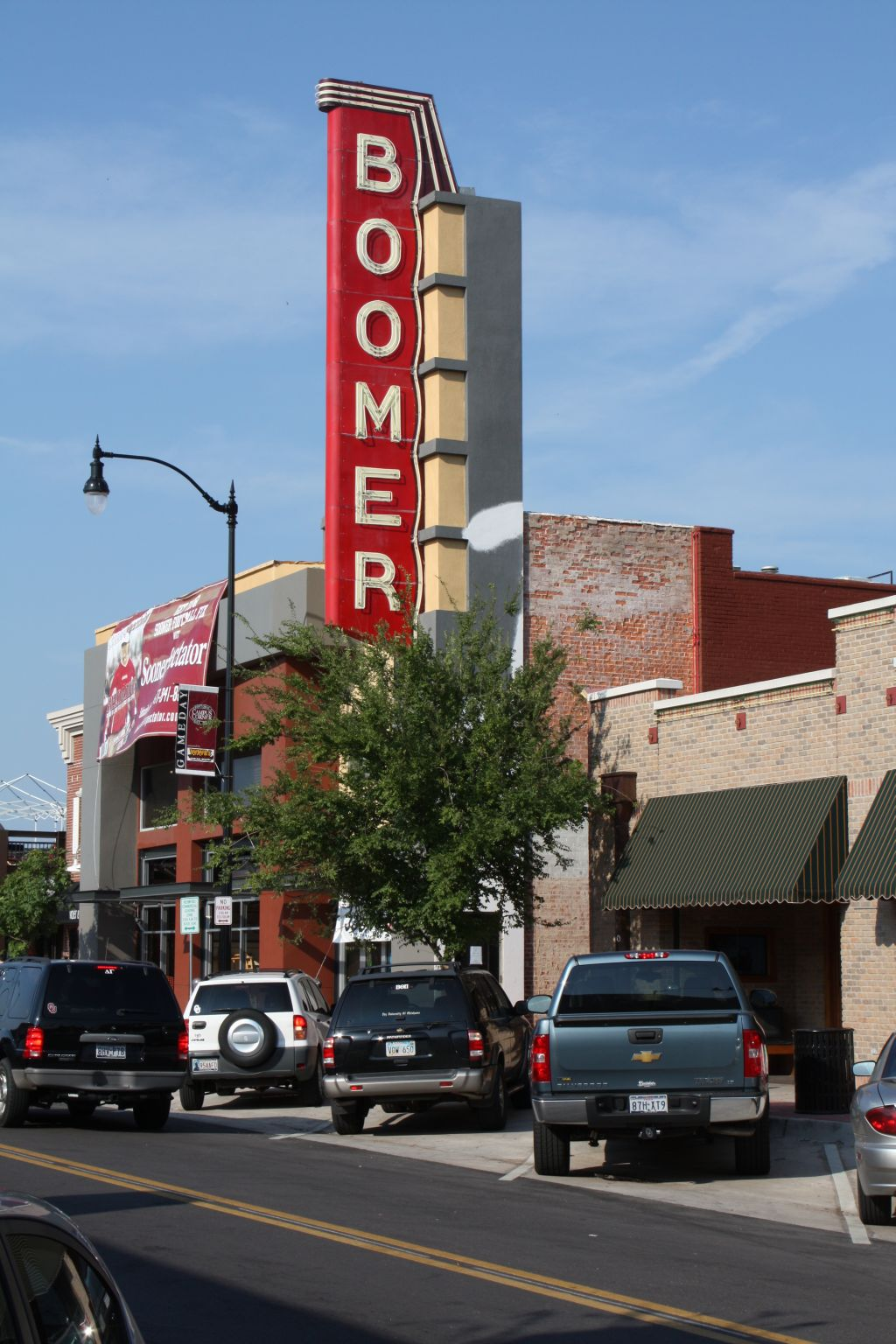
Boomer Theater in Campus Corner

During the 1950s enrollment at the university was swelling and as a result Campus Corner was booming. Because of the close proximity between merchants and students, a unique relationship was formed. Many activities were held in Campus Corner. Some of those included RUF/NEKS (a university pep squad) ceremonies, the public shaving of beards to signal the end of Engineers Week, tobacco spitting contests, and numerous bonfires celebrating football games.

By the early 1960s enrollment was growing greater than the university's ability to house its students and as a result the decision was made to build new housing on the south end of campus. With the new residence towers completed in the mid-1960s, the popularity of Campus Corner waned. More students were living further from campus as dorms and Greek houses changed locations and more students began to drive. In the 1970s retailers began to build malls and strip centers further west of campus with better access to Norman's primary highway, Interstate 35.

As a result of civic improvements and private funding, the area began to re-emerge as a shopping and social destination in the early-2000s. In recent years the city has improved the infrastructure in the area including new utility lines, lights, security systems, landscaping, parking meters with one-hour limits, curbs, sidewalks, and traffic controls. Campus Corner property owners have also consolidated their properties and organized with one another to deal with long-standing challenges in the area. Owners and tenants have renovated the century-old buildings, having demolished interior walls, re-wired, and re-plumbed much of the area to meet modern city codes. In 2003, head OU football coach Bob Stoops became part owner of a new sports bar in Campus Corner that started a wave of new restaurant openings. Since that time many new businesses have been established in the area, its growth continuing into the 2010s.

=== Harold's ===
In 1935 high school student Harold Powell began working for McCall's department store in Campus Corner; several years later, in 1948, McCall's left the area and Powell opened his own store at the same location. Called Harold's, the department store initially focused on traditional clothing for the many college students in the area. In the 1970s Harold's expanded with new locations in Oklahoma City, Tulsa, and Memphis, Tennessee. Throughout the 1970s and 1980s Harold's went on to become a successful regional chain of traditional, high-end men's and women's clothing stores with its headquarters in Dallas. The Campus Corner location remained open until 2008 when the chain filed for bankruptcy, liquidating all of its assets and closing all store locations.

== Campus Corner today ==
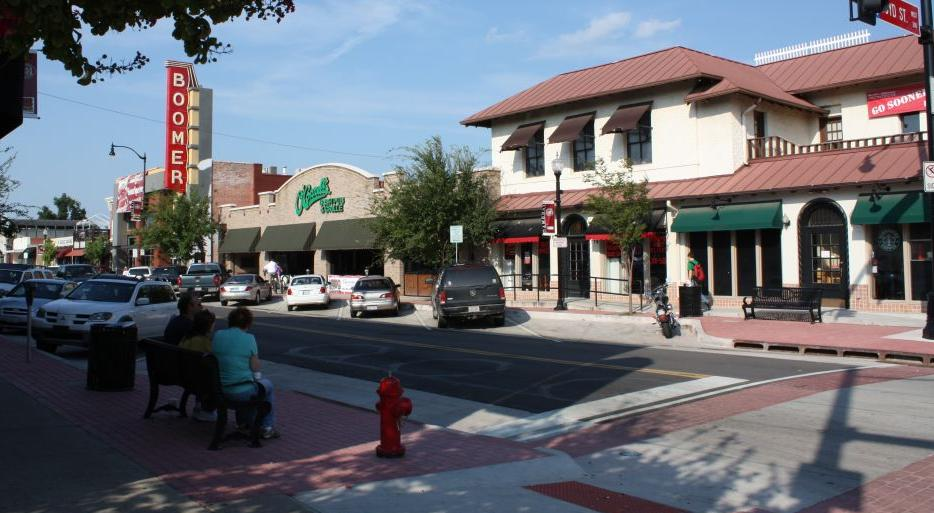
Campus Corner near Boyd and Asp

Today, Campus Corner is home to many businesses including bars, restaurants, banks, computer/technology retail, coffee shops, a newspaper, hair salons, gift shops, accessories boutiques, churches, professional organizations, a bridal shop, and several professional offices.
