= NRHS =

NRHS may refer to:

== Educational institutions ==
=== Canada ===
- Northumberland Regional High School, Westville, Nova Scotia

=== United States ===
- Narragansett Regional High School, Templeton, Massachusetts
- Nashoba Regional High School, Bolton, Massachusetts
- Nauset Regional High School, Eastham, Massachusetts
- North Reading High School, North Reading, Massachusetts
- Newfound Regional High School, Bristol, New Hampshire
- Nazareth Regional High School (Brooklyn), New York City, New York
- New Rochelle High School, New Rochelle, New York
- North Rockland High School, Thiells, New York
- North Rowan High School, Spencer, North Carolina
- North Ridgeville High School, North Ridgeville, Ohio
- North Royalton High School, North Royalton, Ohio
- Nansemond River High School, Suffolk, Virginia

== Other uses ==
- National Railway Historical Society, United States

== See also ==
- NRH (disambiguation)
