= Norman Regional Hospital =

- Norman Regional Health System

Geography
- Location: Norman, Oklahoma, United States
- Coordinates: 35.23027°N 97.44011°W

Organization
- Type: General

Services
- Emergency department: Level III trauma center
- Beds: 324

Helipads
- Helipad: Yes

History
- Founded: 2 June 1946

Links
- Website: www.normanregional.com
- Lists: Hospitals in Oklahoma

Norman Regional Hospital is a 324-bed general hospital that serves Norman, Oklahoma and the surrounding communities. Founded in 1946 as Norman Municipal Hospital, Norman Regional has since become one of the state's busiest hospitals, with its emergency department receiving more than 70,000 annual visitors.

== History ==
Norman Regional Hospital was founded on 2 June 1946 as Norman Municipal Hospital. The 61 bed facility was funded through bonds and a grant from the Federal Works Agency. Norman Municipal changed its name to Norman Regional in 1984.

== Medical Services ==
- Emergency Department
- Stroke Center
- Surgical Services
- Cancer Services
- Imaging Services
