= National Register of Historic Places listings in Beckham County, Oklahoma =

Location of Beckham County in Oklahoma

This is a list of the National Register of Historic Places listings in Beckham County, Oklahoma.

This is intended to be a complete list of the properties and districts on the National Register of Historic Places in Beckham County, Oklahoma, United States. The locations of National Register properties and districts for which the latitude and longitude coordinates are included below, may be seen in a map.

There are 15 properties and districts currently listed on the National Register in the county.

This National Park Service list is complete through NPS recent listings posted March 21, 2025.

== Current listings ==
	Name on the Register	Image	Date listed	Location	City or town	Description
1	Beckham County Courthouse	Beckham County Courthouse	August 23, 1984 (#84002968)	Courthouse Sq. 35°17′29″N 99°38′12″W	Sayre	
2	Casa Grande Hotel	Casa Grande Hotel	February 23, 1995 (#95000043)	103 E. 3rd St. 35°24′43″N 99°24′15″W	Elk City	
3	J. W. Danner House	J. W. Danner House	March 13, 2002 (#02000169)	408 N. 4th St. 35°17′42″N 99°38′22″W	Sayre	
4	Edwards Archeological Site		September 19, 1973 (#73001554)	Address Restricted	Carter	
5	First National Bank	First National Bank	December 11, 1979 (#79001987)	101 S. Main St. 35°12′53″N 99°52′01″W	Erick	
6	Hedlund Motor Company Building	Hedlund Motor Company Building	September 22, 1983 (#83002072)	206 S. Main; 35°24′35″N 99°24′15″W	Elk City	
7	Magnolia Service Station	Magnolia Service Station	February 23, 1995 (#95000028)	Southwestern corner of the junction of Elm St. and former U.S. Route 66; 35°13′08″N 99°59′29″W	Texola	
8	Sayre Champlin Service Station	Sayre Champlin Service Station	March 3, 2004 (#04000130)	126 West Main; 35°17′27″N 99°38′27″W	Sayre	
9	Sayre City Park	Sayre City Park	March 3, 2004 (#04000127)	200 yards south of the junction of E1200 Rd. and N1870 Rd. 35°16′28″N 99°38′43″W	Sayre	
10	Sayre Downtown Historic District	Sayre Downtown Historic District	December 9, 2002 (#02000972)	Main and 4th Sts. 35°17′29″N 99°38′22″W	Sayre	
11	Sayre Rock Island Depot	Sayre Rock Island Depot	June 9, 2000 (#00000654)	106 E. Poplar; 35°17′35″N 99°38′19″W	Sayre	
12	Storm House	Storm House	October 6, 1983 (#83004162)	721 W. Broadway; 35°24′40″N 99°24′45″W	Elk City	
13	Vannerson Homestead		December 8, 2015 (#15000865)	Address Restricted	Erick vicinity	
14	West Winds Motel	West Winds Motel	May 27, 2004 (#04000520)	623 Roger Miller; 35°12′55″N 99°52′23″W	Erick	
15	Whited Grist Mill	Whited Grist Mill	January 1, 1976 (#76001554)	Old Town Museum, W. 3rd St. and N. Pioneer Rd. 35°24′45″N 99°26′05″W	Elk City	

== See also ==
- List of National Historic Landmarks in Oklahoma
- National Register of Historic Places listings in Oklahoma
