= Beckham County, Oklahoma =

County in the United States

- County
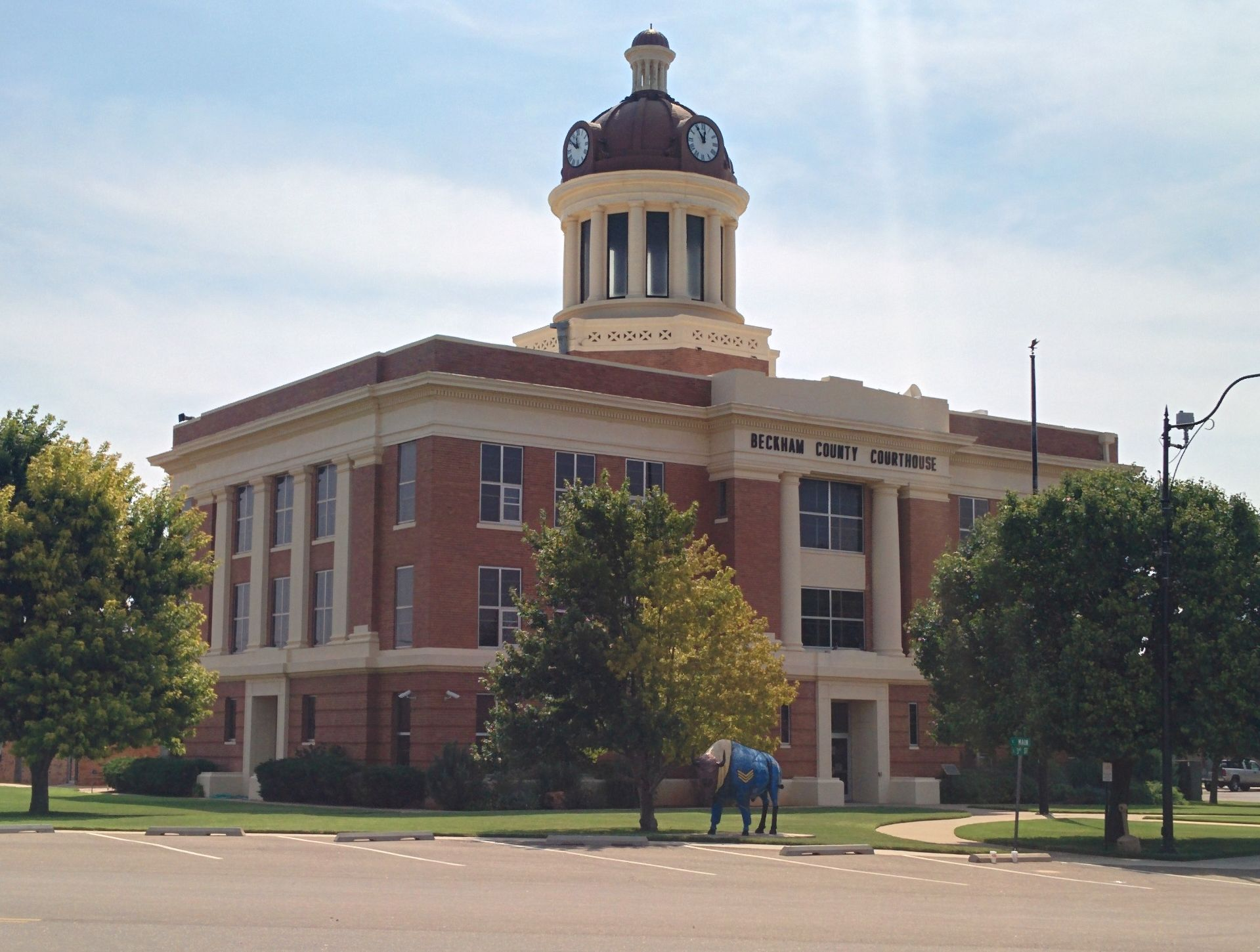
- Beckham County Courthouse, Sayre, Oklahoma 2015

- Location within the U.S. state of Oklahoma
- Coordinates: 35°16′N 99°41′W
- Country: United States
- State: Oklahoma
- Founded: November 16, 1907
- Named for: J. C. W. Beckham
- Seat: Sayre
- Largest city: Elk City

Area
  - Total: 904 sq mi (2,340 km^{2})
  - Land: 902 sq mi (2,340 km^{2})
  - Water: 2.1 sq mi (5.4 km^{2}) 0.2%

Population (2020)
  - Total: 22,410
  - Estimate (2025): 22,159 ▼
  - Density: 24.8/sq mi (9.59/km^{2})
- Time zone: UTC−6 (Central)
  - Summer (DST): UTC−5 (CDT)
- Congressional district: 3rd
- Website: beckham.okcounties.org

Beckham County is a county located on the western border of the U.S. state of Oklahoma. As of the 2020 census, the population was 22,410. Its county seat is Sayre. Founded upon statehood in 1907, Beckham County was named for J. C. W. Beckham, who was Governor of Kentucky and the first popularly elected member of the United States Senate from Kentucky. Beckham County comprises the Elk City, OK Micropolitan Statistical Area.

== History ==
In 1855, the U.S. government leased the western part of the formerly reserved Choctaw and Chickasaw Nation lands, which became known as the Leased District. After the Civil War, the two nations were forced to cede the land to the US government under terms of new treaties required because they had been allies of the Confederacy. Under the treaties they were also required to emancipate their slaves and provide them with citizenship in their nations.

In 1869, the former Leased District was designated by the President as the Cheyenne and Arapaho Indian Reservation, following their removal from further west. During the 1880s, Texas cattlemen leased grazing land from the Cheyenne and Arapaho.

Under the Dawes Act of 1891, the government split up such communal lands, allocating plots to individual households of various tribes. After distribution was made, the government declared any additional lands on the reservation to be "surplus". In 1892, the government opened such surplus land to settlement by non-Indians, attracting numerous European-American settlers and immigrants. The area was designated as County F in the newly created Oklahoma Territory, until it was renamed Roger Mills County.

In 1896, Greer County, Texas was transferred to the Oklahoma Territory and became Greer County, Oklahoma, following a United States Supreme Court decision in the United States v. State of Texas boundary dispute case. At statehood, portions of land from both Roger Mills and Greer County were joined to form Beckham County. Sayre was named as the temporary county seat. A 1908 election after statehood made Sayre, Oklahoma the permanent seat.

In 1910, a piece of southern Beckham County was returned to Greer County, Oklahoma.

The Gannett survey of 1927-1929 found that the true 100th Meridian, the boundary between Texas and western Oklahoma, was 3,800 feet (1,200 m) farther east than previously thought. The US Supreme Court ruled on March 17, 1930 that the strip of land must be returned to Texas, thereby reducing Beckham County's area slightly.

== Geography ==
According to the U.S. Census Bureau, the county has a total area of 904 square miles (2,340 km^{2}), of which 902 square miles (2,340 km^{2}) is land and 2.1 square miles (5.4 km^{2}) (0.2%) is water. The county is drained by the North Fork of the Red River and its tributaries: the Timber, Sweetwater, and Buffalo creeks. The northwestern part of the county is part of the High Plains. The rest of the county is part of the Gypsum Hills physiographic region.

=== Major highways ===
- I-40
- US 283
- SH-6
- SH-30
- SH-34
- SH-55
- SH-152

=== Adjacent counties ===
- Roger Mills County (north)
- Custer County (northeast)
- Washita County (east)
- Kiowa County (southeast)
- Greer County (south)
- Harmon County (southwest)
- Collingsworth County, Texas (west)
- Wheeler County, Texas (northwest)

== Demographics ==
Historical population
Census	Pop.	Note	%±
1910	19,699		—
1920	18,989		−3.6%
1930	28,991		52.7%
1940	22,169		−23.5%
1950	21,627		−2.4%
1960	17,782		−17.8%
1970	15,754		−11.4%
1980	19,243		22.1%
1990	18,812		−2.2%
2000	19,799		5.2%
2010	22,119		11.7%
2020	22,410		1.3%
2025 (est.)	22,159	▼	−1.1%
U.S. Decennial Census; 1790-1960 1900-1990; 1990-2000 2010

=== 2020 census ===
As of the 2020 census, the county had a population of 22,410. Of the residents, 24.1% were under the age of 18 and 15.5% were 65 years of age or older; the median age was 36.9 years. For every 100 females there were 120.0 males, and for every 100 females age 18 and over there were 125.2 males.

The racial makeup of the county was 78.2% White, 5.1% Black or African American, 3.8% American Indian and Alaska Native, 0.6% Asian, 4.8% from some other race, and 7.5% from two or more races. Hispanic or Latino residents of any race comprised 12.0% of the population.

There were 8,034 households in the county, of which 33.5% had children under the age of 18 living with them and 25.2% had a female householder with no spouse or partner present. About 29.0% of all households were made up of individuals and 13.0% had someone living alone who was 65 years of age or older.

There were 10,123 housing units, of which 20.6% were vacant. Among occupied housing units, 67.9% were owner-occupied and 32.1% were renter-occupied. The homeowner vacancy rate was 3.1% and the rental vacancy rate was 25.7%.

=== 2010 census ===
As of the 2010 United States census, there were 22,119 people, 8,163 households, and 5,485 families residing in the county. The population density was 24.5 people per square mile (9.5 people/km^{2}). There were 9,647 housing units at an average density of 10.7 units per square mile (4.1/km^{2}). The racial makeup of the county was 85% white, 4% black or African American, 2.8% Native American, 0.8% Asian, less than 0.01% Pacific Islander, 4.6% from other races, and 2.8% from two or more races. Twelve percent of the population was Hispanic or Latino.

In 2010, there were 8,163 households, out of which 34.6% included children under the age of 18, 50.9% were married couples living together, 11.1% had a female householder with no husband present, 5.1% had a male householder with no wife present, and 32.8% were non-families. Individuals living alone accounted for 27.6% of households and 11.2% had someone living alone who was 65 years of age or older. The average household size was 2.48 and the average family size was 3.02. In the county, the population was spread out, with 24.1% under the age of 18, 9.9% from 18 to 24, 28.1% from 25 to 44, 25.2% from 45 to 64, and 12.7% who were 65 years of age or older. The median age was 35.4 years. For every 100 females there were 105 males. For every 100 females age 18 and over, there were 112 males.

The median income for a household in the county was $45,726, and the median income for a family was $57,316. Males had a median income of $42,470 versus $27,075 for females. The per capita income for the county was $21,470. More than 12% of families and 15% of the population were below the poverty line, including 26% of those under age 18 and 14.4% of those age 65 or over.

== Politics ==
Voter Registration and Party Enrollment as of May 31, 2023
Party	Number of Voters	Percentage
Democratic	2,300	20.09%
Republican	7,328	64.01%
Others	1,821	15.90%
Total	11,449	100%

United States presidential election results for Beckham County, Oklahoma
Year	Republican		Democratic		Third party(ies)	
Year	No.	%	No.	%	No.	%
1908	866	27.16%	1,807	56.68%	515	16.15%
1912	648	20.84%	1,566	50.37%	895	28.79%
1916	527	16.09%	1,850	56.49%	898	27.42%
1920	1,755	36.99%	2,347	49.46%	643	13.55%
1924	1,357	30.93%	2,496	56.90%	534	12.17%
1928	3,810	62.36%	2,201	36.02%	99	1.62%
1932	892	12.98%	5,979	87.02%	0	0.00%
1936	1,352	19.94%	5,372	79.23%	56	0.83%
1940	2,148	31.67%	4,598	67.79%	37	0.55%
1944	2,034	35.96%	3,608	63.78%	15	0.27%
1948	1,310	22.38%	4,544	77.62%	0	0.00%
1952	4,504	53.14%	3,972	46.86%	0	0.00%
1956	3,194	47.28%	3,561	52.72%	0	0.00%
1960	4,258	61.01%	2,721	38.99%	0	0.00%
1964	2,557	38.32%	4,115	61.68%	0	0.00%
1968	2,935	42.92%	2,354	34.42%	1,550	22.66%
1972	4,472	71.72%	1,608	25.79%	155	2.49%
1976	2,351	33.90%	4,530	65.32%	54	0.78%
1980	3,637	51.13%	3,298	46.37%	178	2.50%
1984	5,005	65.39%	2,601	33.98%	48	0.63%
1988	3,463	50.08%	3,388	48.99%	64	0.93%
1992	2,913	37.25%	2,947	37.69%	1,960	25.06%
1996	2,912	44.45%	2,797	42.70%	842	12.85%
2000	4,067	62.26%	2,408	36.86%	57	0.87%
2004	5,454	73.85%	1,931	26.15%	0	0.00%
2008	5,772	78.03%	1,625	21.97%	0	0.00%
2012	5,508	79.54%	1,417	20.46%	0	0.00%
2016	6,308	83.53%	960	12.71%	284	3.76%
2020	6,767	85.14%	1,048	13.19%	133	1.67%
2024	6,474	84.32%	1,093	14.24%	111	1.45%

== Economy ==
The county economy has been based mainly on farming and raising livestock. The major crops have been cotton, wheat, alfalfa, kafir, milo maize, and broomcorn. Mineral industries have occasionally been significant. In the early 20th century, there was some salt production. A limited amount of oil and gas production began in the 1920s.

== Public Libraries ==
Oklahoma’s first public library was in Guthrie, Oklahoma. Guthrie and Oklahoma City both opened libraries in 1901. This was the beginning of many libraries being established in Oklahoma.

“Generally, most public libraries in Oklahoma were instigated by women's clubs. In addition, civic leagues, men's clubs, and ministers helped communities to fund and furnish libraries. Initially, small collections of reading material were housed in city halls, courthouses, business establishments such as furniture stores and newspaper offices, and churches until a public library building could be erected. At 1907 statehood Oklahoma had seventeen publicly accessible libraries. The number rose to forty-nine in 1922 to seventy in 1937."

Beckham County has three public libraries: Erick Public Library, Sayre Public Library, and Elk City Carnegie Library.

=== History of Elk City Carnegie Public Library ===
On February 24, Mrs. John Scott, who had accepted chairmanship as president for the Elk City Library Association, held a meeting. The local Presbyterian Church of Elk City had been running a Sunday School library for many years that eventually led to the association being established. The Elk City Carnegie Library originally opened by renting a room in the back of the local bank building. Two hundred and fifty books had been donated, a librarian hired, and the library was able to hold open hours with the assistance of two Association members. Monthly subscriptions covered by local businesses maintained the library. By the second anniversary of the library, the Association requested obtaining a Carnegie building. On October 11, 1915, the new library building was opened through the gift of $10,000 from the Carnegie Corporation. The library has served as “a cultural and educational center." Today, the library continues to serve the community.

== Communities ==
=== Cities ===
- Elk City
- Erick
- Sayre (county seat)

=== Towns ===
- Carter
- Sweetwater (partially in Roger Mills County)
- Texola

=== Unincorporated communities ===
- Delhi
- Hext
- Mayfield
- Retrop

== Education ==
School districts include:

- Canute Public Schools
- Elk City Public Schools
- Erick Public Schools
- Hammon Public Schools
- Mangum Public Schools
- Merritt Public Schools
- Sayre Public Schools
- Sentinel Public Schools
- Sweetwater Public Schools

== NRHP sites ==
The following sites in Beckham County are listed on the National Register of Historic Places:

- Edwards Archaeological Site, Carter
- Casa Grande Hotel, Elk City
- Hedlund Motor Company Building, Elk City
- Storm House, Elk City
- Whited Grist Mill, Elk City
- First National Bank (Erick, Oklahoma), Erick
- West Winds Motel, Erick
- Beckham County Courthouse, Sayre
- Sayre Champlin Service Station, Sayre
- Sayre City Park, Sayre
- J. W. Danner House, Sayre
- Sayre Downtown Historic District, Sayre
- Sayre Rock Island Depot, Sayre
- Magnolia Service Station, Texola
