= Ray Mallouf =

American football player (1918–2008)

No. 78, 22
- Positions: Quarterback, punter

Personal information
- Born: July 11, 1918; Sayre, Oklahoma, U.S.
- Died: June 6, 2008 (aged 89); Dallas, Texas, U.S.
- Listed height: 5 ft 11 in (1.80 m)
- Listed weight: 180 lb (82 kg)

Career information
- High school: Sayre
- College: SMU
- NFL draft: 1941: 10th round, 83rd overall pick

Career history
- Chicago Cardinals (1941, 1946–1948); New York Giants (1949)

Awards and highlights
- NFL champion (1947)

Career NFL statistics
- Passing attempts: 325
- Passing completions: 159
- Completion percentage: 48.9%
- TD–INT: 20–16
- Passing yards: 2,504
- Passer rating: 75
- Stats at Pro Football Reference

Raymond Lucian Mallouf (Note: Mallouf's draft registration card of October 1940, which he signed, indicated that he did not have a middle name.) (July 11, 1918 – June 6, 2008) was an American professional football player who was a quarterback and punter in the National Football League (NFL). He played four seasons for the Chicago Cardinals, interrupted by World War II, and one season with the New York Giants.

== Biography ==
Mallouf played college football for the SMU Mustangs, where he was nicknamed the "slinging Syrian". He was selected in the 10th round of the 1941 NFL draft by the Chicago Cardinals.

After playing for the Cardinals in 1941, Mallouf missed the 1942 through 1945 seasons due to his service in the United States Navy during World War II. After the war, he resumed his career with the Cardinals in the 1946 season. Mallouf was a member of the 1947 Chicago Cardinals, winners of the 1947 NFL Championship Game over the Philadelphia Eagles. The following season, he was the Cardinals' starting quarterback in the 1948 NFL Championship Game due to a wrist injury to Paul Christman against the Bears in the regular season finale. The championship game, played in blizzard conditions, saw the Cardinals lose, 7–0, in a rematch with the Eagles. He went 3-for-7 for 38 yards, which actually made him the leading passer in the whole game (his teammate Charley Trippi and Charley Eikenberg each threw four incompletions, one of which resulted in an interception). Mallouf also punted eight times. An attempted handoff by Mallouf to Elmer Angsman resulted in a fumble recovered by the Eagles (Frank Kilroy) that led to the only score of the game in the fourth quarter. Mallouf was the last Cardinal to start a playoff game until Jim Hart in 1974 and the last to start a championship game until Kurt Warner in Super Bowl XLIII in 2009. In September 1949, the Cardinals traded Mallouf to the New York Giants for a player to be named later. He completed his NFL career that season, with the Giants. After being released by he Giants in January 1950, Mallouf was selected by the Green Bay Packers late in the 1950 NFL draft—allowed under draft rules at the time—but never played for the Packers.

Mallouf was the first quarterback in NFL history to achieve a perfect passer rating of 158.3, which he achieved on October 17, 1948, (Note: The NFL's passer rating formula was not created until the 1970s, but has been retroactively applied to earlier games.) when he led the Cardinals to a 63–35 victory over the Giants. He completed 14 of 18 passes, totaling 252 yards, along with four touchdowns and no interceptions.

== See also ==
- List of NFL quarterbacks who have posted a perfect passer rating
