= Delhi, Oklahoma =

Unincorporated community in Oklahoma, US

- Unincorporated community
- Location in Oklahoma Location in the United States
- Coordinates: 35°10′29″N 99°40′35″W
- Country: United States
- State: Oklahoma
- County: Beckham
- Elevation: 1,923 ft (586 m)
- Time zone: UTC-6 (Central (CST))
  - Summer (DST): UTC-5 (CDT)
- Area code: 580
- GNIS feature ID: 1092036

Delhi is an unincorporated community in Beckham County, Oklahoma, United States. Delhi is located west of U.S. Route 283 and 8.3 miles (13.4 km) southwest of Sayre. The community is named for the city in India and first had a post office in 1893.
