= Jefferson Spivey =

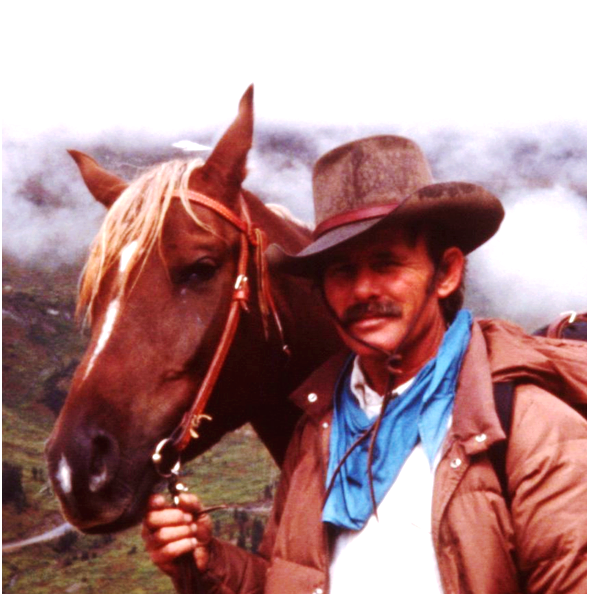
- Jefferson Spivey and his horse Najah during his Rocky Mountain Ride of 1984
- Born: 1934; Erick, Oklahoma
- Died: July 2022 (aged 87–88); Yukon, Oklahoma
- Occupations: Author, inventor

Jefferson Spivey born in 1934 is an American author, conservationist, equestrian, and inventor. Spivey is best known for his multiple solo horseback rides spanning two decades to promote conservation, animal migration welfare and access to public lands. He proposed the creation of a "Freedom Freeway" trail system, later renamed "Freedom Trails" for non-motorized transport, promoting unencumbered access to the environment for hikers, bicyclists, horseman, and the like.

== Horseback rides ==
=== Trans-continental ride of 1968 ===
Jefferson Spivey began the ride April 28, 1968 on the Pacific coast of Santa Barbara, California, and ended on the Atlantic coast of Rehoboth Beach, Delaware, 7 months later. The ride crossed 14 states and covered approximately 4,000 miles. The purpose of the ride was to bring awareness to conservation issues, especially the effects of pollution on the environment. Jefferson planted a seed from the giant California redwood tree in each state he crossed. He wrote a book about this journey called Wind Drinker.

=== Rocky Mountain ride of 1984 ===
Jefferson began his Rocky Mountain ride in Canada and ended in Juarez, Mexico. The journey covered 3,210 miles and took 3 months to complete.

=== Oklahoma City to Santa Fe ride of 1985 ===
Jefferson carried a letter from Oklahoma Governor George Nigh to promote Freedom Trails to the capital of New Mexico. The journey covered 1,000 miles and took 1 month to complete.

=== Namibia ride of 1986 ===
Jefferson was invited by tourism officials in Namibia to investigate establishing a trail system for horseback riders along the Namib desert. He rode with a guard of soldiers commanded by Col. Pinkie Coetzee of the South West Africa Special unit. The ride lasted 2 weeks.

== Inventions ==
Jefferson received a patent for his hunting knife on July 25, 1972. This knife was born out of his experiences and utilitarian needs on the Trans-Continental Ride of 1968. It is now known as the Sabertooth Knife.

Jefferson received a patent for another knife design on September 23, 1980.

Jefferson received a patent for his saddle on November 8, 1988.
