= Mayfield, Oklahoma =

Unincorporated community in Oklahoma, US

- Unincorporated community
- Location in Oklahoma Location in the United States
- Coordinates: 35°20′20″N 99°52′36″W
- Country: United States
- State: Oklahoma
- County: Beckham
- Elevation: 2,005 ft (611 m)
- Time zone: UTC-6 (Central (CST))
  - Summer (DST): UTC-5 (CDT)
- Area code: 580
- GNIS feature ID: 1100612

Mayfield is an unincorporated community in Beckham County, Oklahoma, United States, It is on Oklahoma State Highway 30, 8.5 miles (13.7 km) north of Erick. Its post office opened on December 23, 1902; its first postmaster was Alfred S. Mayfield, for whom the community is named.
