= Hext, Oklahoma =

Unincorporated community in Oklahoma, US

Hext
- Unincorporated community
- Location in Oklahoma Location in the United States
- Coordinates: 35°14′51″N 99°45′10″W
- Country: United States
- State: Oklahoma
- County: Beckham
- Elevation: 1,923 ft (586 m)
- Time zone: UTC-6 (Central (CST))
  - Summer (DST): UTC-5 (CDT)
- GNIS feature ID: 1100490

Hext is an unincorporated rural community in Beckham County, Oklahoma, United States. The town was named after a local resident, William Hext. It is located between Interstate 40 and Interstate 40 Business Route (the former US Route 66).

== History and economy ==
Settlement in the general area of Hext occurred when the Choctaw, Oklahoma and Gulf Railroad (later the Rock Island Railroad) built a line west through the area. Hext had a post office between June 4, 1901, and November 29, 1902. Hext was aligned along Route 66 in 1929 (5th Street) after the route was changed from the 1926 alignment. This was along the last section of Route 66 to lose its designation to Interstate 40, in 1975.

On the western side of the village, on the south side of Route 66 is an old stone building belonging to a filling station whose service bay was reconverted into a house after the pumps were removed.

There are no businesses in this area. The major economic activities in the area are horse breeding and farming.
