= Roger Miller Museum =

Coordinates: 35°12′53″N 99°51′59″W

The Roger Miller Museum was a museum dedicated to the life and career of entertainer Roger Miller. It was located on historic U.S. Route 66 in downtown Erick, Oklahoma, Miller's home town.

The 3,000 square feet (280 m^{2}) Roger Miller Museum opened at the corner of U.S. 66 (Roger Miller Boulevard) and Oklahoma 30 (Sheb Wooley Avenue) in 2004 in a former 1929 café and drugstore building.

On display were many artifacts of Miller's career including musical instruments, rare photos, and Miller's stage costumes. Several times a year the museum conducted fundraising events in the local area which included an annual street festival and concert in late October.

Because of funding issues, the museum's last day of operation was December 23, 2017. It is now permanently closed for business. Most of the artifacts were on loan from Roger Miller's widow Mary Miller, and were returned to her after the closing.

== See also ==
- List of music museums
