= ExxonMobil Beaumont Refinery =

Oil refinery in Texas, US

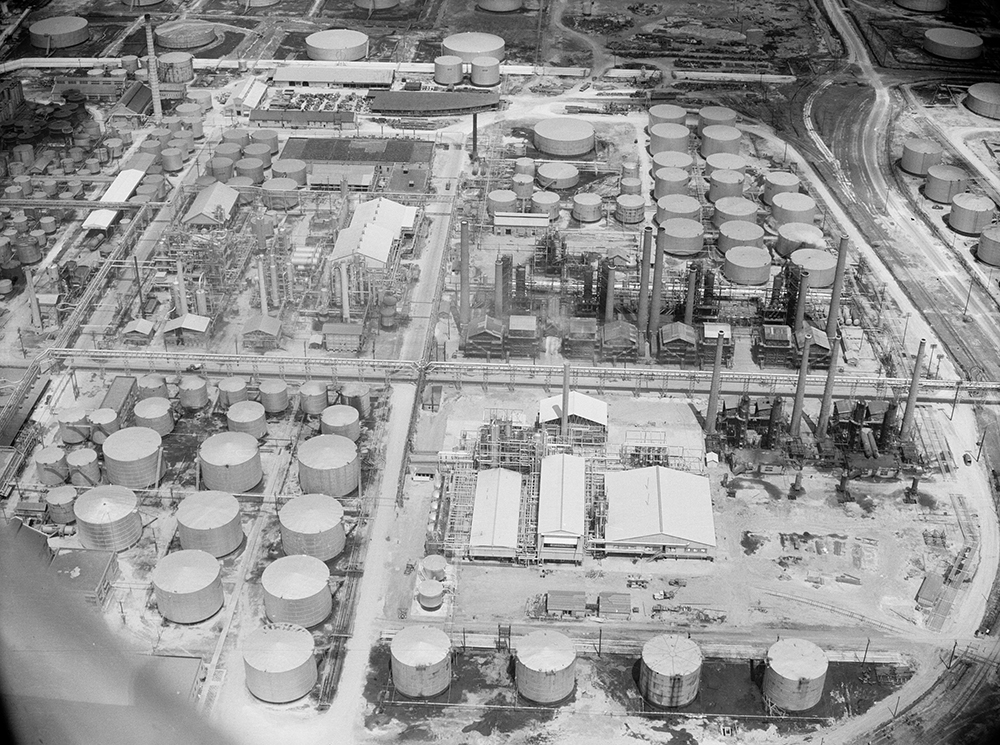

- Location of the Beaumont Refinery
- Location: Beaumont, Texas, USA; 30°06′58″N 94°07′13″W

Refinery details
- Operator: ExxonMobil
- Opened: 1903
- Capacity: 609,024 barrels per day (96,827.1 m^{3}/d)
- Complexity index: 9.03
- No. of employees: 2,000 plus 3,000 contractors

The ExxonMobil Refinery in Beaumont, Texas was built along the banks of the Neches River in 1903. The refinery, operated by ExxonMobil is currently the eleventh largest in the world with a nameplate capacity of 609,024 bpcd. The plant is also highly integrated with petrochemicals production and lubricants and is a critical part of the Texas-Louisiana gulf coast energy infrastructure. The site encompasses more than 2,700 acres and is staffed by 2,000 employees daily plus another 3,000 contractors to support maintenance and construction activities.

== History ==
In 1903, construction started on the Burt Refining Company to capitalize on the prolific Spindletop field located just south of Beaumont. Little was known of Burt Refining's origins other than George A. Burts was the owner and was rumored to have been an agent of John D. Rockefeller. In 1909, the State of Texas seized the refinery as an illegal affiliate of Standard Oil and sold in an auction to Magnolia Petroleum Co. The refinery became Texas's third largest by 1920 under Magnolia as the company expanded throughout the region. As Magnolia Petroleum Company expanded its influence in the southwestern United States, Standard Oil Company of New York (SOCONY Mobil) began acquiring shares in the company. In December 1925, all Magnolia stock was exchanged for Standard Oil of New York shares, and the Texas assets were subsequently transferred to Magnolia Petroleum Company. The Magnolia Refinery played a key role during World War II as it stepped up production and shipped oil globally. By 1959, the operations of the Magnolia Oil Company had been merged entirely into SOCONY Mobil. The refinery further in the ensuing decades to becomes Beaumont's largest employer and eventually Mobil's largest refinery by 1980. In 1999, Exxon and Mobil merged to form the largest oil company in the world and the Beaumont Refinery became one of the 5 largest refineries in the combined company's portfolio. Following a $2 billion major capital investment program twenty five years later, including a new 250,000 bpd crude unit, Beaumont became the third largest oil refinery in North America and the largest of any of ExxonMobil's plants.

== Units ==
=== Petroleum refining units ===
According to ExxonMobil's filings with the US DOE's Energy Information Agency, the unit capacities for the Beaumont Refinery are presented below:

| Units | Capacity in BPCD |
|---|---|
| Total Refinery Nameplate | 634,000 |
| Atmospheric Distillation | 634,000 |
| Vacuum Distillation | 180,000 |
| Delayed Coking | 46,500 |
| FCC | 115,000 |
| Hydrocracking | 70,000 |
| Naphtha Reforming | 146,000 |
| Aklylation | 16,300 |
| ULSD Hydrotreating | 97,000 |
| Gasoline/Naphtha Hydrotreating | 69,700 |
| Kero Jet Hydrotreating | 121,000 |
| Naphtha Reformer Feed Hydrotreating | 166,300 |
| Heavy Gas Oil Hydrotreating | 23,300 |
| Isomerization (C5/C6) | 38,600 |
| Isomerization (C4) | 14,600 |
| Lubes | 9,000 |

The refinery has a Nelson complexity index of 9.0, making it moderately complex.

The refinery has three crude trains. The smallest is CDU A with a capacity of 110,000 bpd. The second crude unit is CDU B with a capacity of 274,000 bpd. The newest CDU C was designed for lighter crude oils produced by shale crudes and light tight oils and has 250,000 bpd of capacity.

Starting in 2019, the refinery underwent a major expansion with a 65% increase in its nameplate capacity as part of a $2 billion program. KBR was contracted to lead the work with a scope that covered offsite facilities and interconnecting units within the expansion This followed ExxonMobil's earlier contract with TechnipFMC PLC for EPC services on four new units, including an atmospheric pipe still, hydrotreater units, and a benzene recovery system.

The refinery has a large lubricant base stocks plant located on 27 acres within the refinery. The lubes plant produces 160 million gallons of lubricants across 275 product types and employs 175 employees and 163 contractors.

=== Electricity generation ===
The refinery has three power plants that are integrated to provide steam and thermal heating to the refinery, in addition to selling electricity to the grid. These are:

| Unit Name | Status | Fuel | Capacity in MW | Technology | Combined Heat and Power | Startup Year |
|---|---|---|---|---|---|---|
| PP-TG41 | Operating | Natural Gas | 163 | Gas Turbine | Yes | 2005 |
| PP-TG42 | Operating | Natural Gas | 163 | Gas Turbine | Yes | 2005 |
| PP-TG43 | Operating | Natural Gas | 163 | Gas Turbine | Yes | 2004 |

=== Petrochemical units ===
The refinery is also integrated with a large ExxonMobil petrochemical facility that is collocated on the same plot. Total ethylene cracking capacity for the site is currently 816,000 tons per year according to the Oil & Gas Journal Survey of Steam Crackers.

== Greenhouse gas emissions history ==
As a major emitting facility, the ExxonMobil Beaumont Refinery and Petrochemical Site must report its complete greenhouse gas emissions to the EPA every year subject to the EPA's Greenhouse Gas Reporting Program. The Baytown site's Refinery Facility ID is 110041990913 and the Chemical Plant's is 110000464131.

Statutory reporting data is in the table below:

| Year | Total Reported Direct Emissions | CO2 Emissions Non-Biogenic | Methane Emissions | Nitrous Oxide Emissions |
|---|---|---|---|---|
| | metric ton | metric ton | metric ton | metric ton |
| 2023 | 5,979,837 | 5,984,714 | 19,772 | 11,350 |

== Labor relations ==
The refinery is represented by USW Local 13-243. Labor relations have been contentious at times The U.S. National Labor Relations Board (NLRB) determined that ExxonMobil's 10-month lockout of over 600 workers at the refinery and lube plant was an unlawful attempt to remove the United Steelworkers union as the workers' representative. The NLRB asked an administrative law judge to issue remedies, including back pay, potentially costing Exxon tens of millions. The lockout, which lasted from May 2021 to March 2022, continued while replacements were hired. The NLRB found that Exxon's actions, including messages to workers offering job reinstatement if they voted to decertify the union, undermined federal employee rights. Despite the company's efforts, workers voted to retain USW local 13–243 as their representative.

== Operating history and accidents ==
On April 17, 2013, an explosion and fire at ExxonMobil's Beaumont, Texas refinery injured at least 12 people and killed two. The incident was caused by a hydrotreater heat exchanger, releasing hydrocarbons that ignited. Following the event, multiple negligence-based personal injury lawsuits were filed. ExxonMobil attributed the fire to the actions of Clean Harbors, a subcontractor responsible for cleaning operations. ExxonMobil was fined $616,000 by the U.S. Department of Justice and the Environmental Protection Agency for the fire. After a trial, a jury awarded damages to the families of the workers who died of $44 million.

In 2016, a 37-year old contract worker named Migual Barron was killed during a turnaround at the refinery when struck by a heat exchanger on the 110,000 bpd crude unit.

In 2017, a female contractor named Yesenia Espinoza was killed on while working on the same crude unit when a pipe fell and landed on her. After the accident, a judge issued a temporary restraining order to cease work on the crude unit until an investigation could be completed. The family of Espinoza sued ExxonMobil for medical, burial, funeral expenses plus damages.

== See also ==
- Atmospheric Distillation
- Alkylation
- Cracking
- Delayed Coking
- Hydrotreating
