= Texola, Oklahoma =

Town in Oklahoma, US

- Town
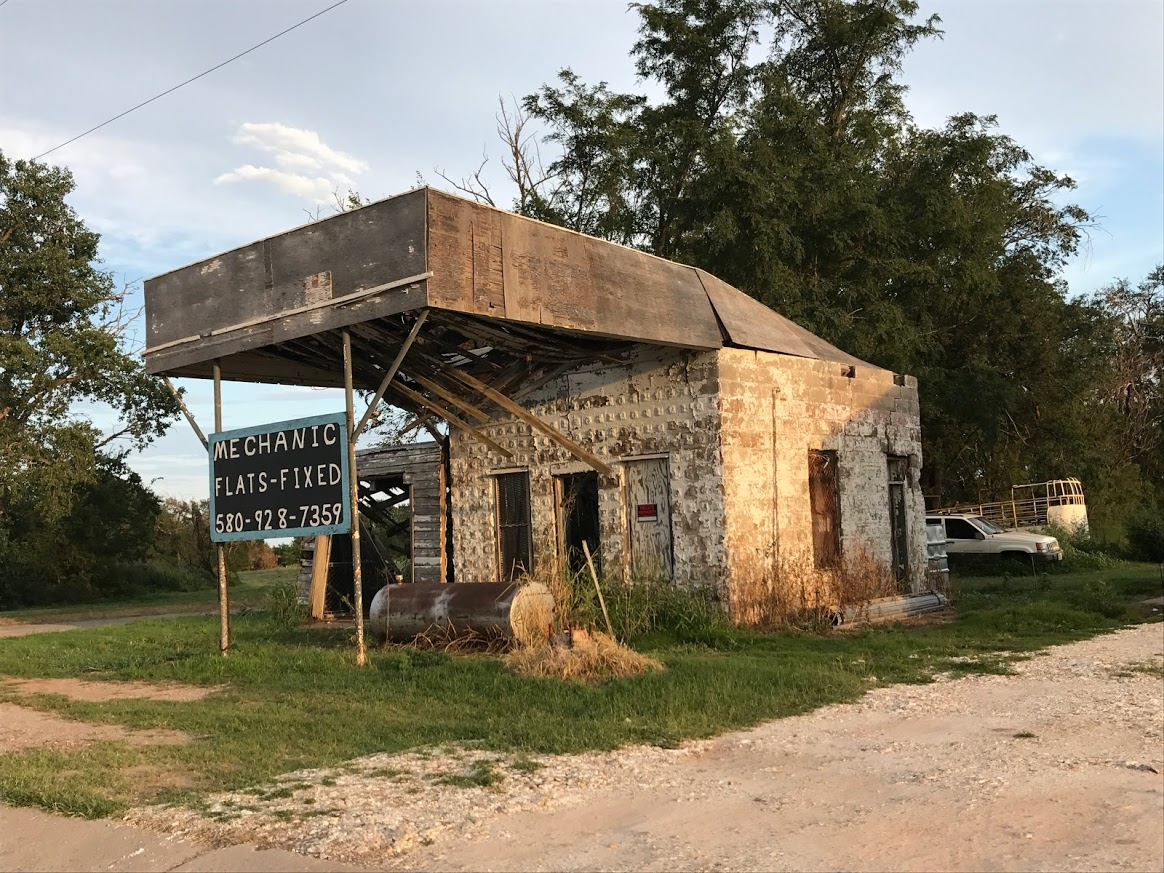
- Magnolia Service Station
- Nickname: Beerola
- Location in Beckham County and the state of Oklahoma.

- Location in Oklahoma Location in the United States
- Coordinates: 35°13′21″N 99°59′35″W
- Country: United States
- State: Oklahoma
- County: Beckham

Area
  - Total: 0.61 sq mi (1.59 km^{2})
  - Land: 0.61 sq mi (1.59 km^{2})
  - Water: 0 sq mi (0.00 km^{2})
- Elevation: 2,152 ft (656 m)

Population (2020)
  - Total: 43
  - Density: 70.2/sq mi (27.11/km^{2})
- Time zone: UTC-6 (Central (CST))
  - Summer (DST): UTC-5 (CDT)
- ZIP code: 73668
- Area code: 580
- FIPS code: 40-73150
- GNIS feature ID: 2413380

Texola is a town in Beckham County, Oklahoma, United States. The population was 43 at the time of the 2020 census, an increase over the 36 figure from the 2010 census.

== History ==
The History of Texola dates back to the early 1900s. Before being named Texola, the town site had been called Texokla and Texoma. Because of its location near the 100th Meridian, the town was surveyed eight different times, which meant that some early residents lived in both Texas and Oklahoma without ever moving. Texola was originally part of northern Greer County until Beckham County was formed after Oklahoma gained statehood in 1907. A post office was established in the community on December 12, 1901, with Reuben H. Grimes serving as the first postmaster. In 1902, the Choctaw, Oklahoma and Gulf Railroad (later owned by the Chicago, Rock Island and Pacific Railway) was built through the town. A weekly newspaper, the Texola Herald, began publishing in 1902 and continued to operate into the early 1920s. By 1909, Texola had two cotton gins as well as a corn and grist mill. The local economy was agriculturally based and several businesses opened in the community.

The 1910 census recorded 361 people living in Texola. That same year, a small Territorial Jail was built. After a slight decline in population during the 1910s, Texola grew rapidly in the 1920s. The population peaked at 581 in the 1930 census. The arrival of Route 66 (also known as 5th Street) had a positive impact on the local economy. Cotton production increased during the decade, necessitating the need for two additional gins. As the town prospered, amenities such as a ten-acre park and an auditorium capable of seating 300 people were found in the community. The population began to decline in the 1940s and continued to do so throughout the remainder of the twentieth century. By 1980, Texola was a town of 106 residents. When the next census was conducted in 1990, Texola had lost nearly 58 percent of its population, leaving just 45 people in the town. The figure is nearly the same in the 2020 census, at 43 people.

=== Historic places ===
The Magnolia Service Station in Texola is listed on the National Register of Historic Places listings in Beckham County, Oklahoma, being placed on the list in 1995. The station was built in 1930 by the Magnolia Petroleum Company on Route 66.

A quirky roadside attraction in Texola is the One Room Jail. It was constructed in the late 1800s out of cinderblock, and consists of a single room with an iron-barred door and window.

== Geography ==
According to the United States Census Bureau, the town has a total area of 0.6 square miles (1.6 km^{2}), all land.

Texola is not directly served by the Oklahoma state highway system. However, the town can be accessed from I-40 Exit 1. U.S. Route 66 passed through the town, bringing scores of travelers for decades, until I-40 was completed to the north in 1975.

== Demographics ==
Historical population
| Census | Pop. | Note | %± |
|---|---|---|---|
| 1910 | 361 | | — |
| 1920 | 298 | | −17.5% |
| 1930 | 581 | | 95.0% |
| 1940 | 337 | | −42.0% |
| 1950 | 265 | | −21.4% |
| 1960 | 202 | | −23.8% |
| 1970 | 144 | | −28.7% |
| 1980 | 106 | | −26.4% |
| 1990 | 45 | | −57.5% |
| 2000 | 47 | | 4.4% |
| 2010 | 36 | | −23.4% |
| 2020 | 43 | | 19.4% |
U.S. Decennial Census

=== 2020 census ===
As of the 2020 census, Texola had a population of 43. The median age was 40.5 years. 20.9% of residents were under the age of 18 and 14.0% of residents were 65 years of age or older. For every 100 females there were 152.9 males, and for every 100 females age 18 and over there were 142.9 males age 18 and over.

0.0% of residents lived in urban areas, while 100.0% lived in rural areas.

There were 20 households in Texola, of which 35.0% had children under the age of 18 living in them. Of all households, 40.0% were married-couple households, 25.0% were households with a male householder and no spouse or partner present, and 30.0% were households with a female householder and no spouse or partner present. About 10.0% of all households were made up of individuals and 5.0% had someone living alone who was 65 years of age or older.

There were 31 housing units, of which 35.5% were vacant. The homeowner vacancy rate was 0.0% and the rental vacancy rate was 0.0%.

Racial composition as of the 2020 census
| Race | Number | Percent |
|---|---|---|
| White | 33 | 76.7% |
| Black or African American | 0 | 0.0% |
| American Indian and Alaska Native | 2 | 4.7% |
| Asian | 0 | 0.0% |
| Native Hawaiian and Other Pacific Islander | 0 | 0.0% |
| Some other race | 3 | 7.0% |
| Two or more races | 5 | 11.6% |
| Hispanic or Latino (of any race) | 5 | 11.6% |

=== 2000 census ===
As of the census of 2000, there were 47 people, 21 households, and 14 families residing in the town. The population density was 76.3 inhabitants per square mile (29.5/km^{2}). There were 32 housing units at an average density of 51.9 per square mile (20.0/km^{2}). The racial makeup of the town was 65.96% White, 6.38% African American, 10.64% Native American, 8.51% Asian, and 8.51% from two or more races. Hispanic or Latino of any race were 2.13% of the population.

There were 21 households, out of which 23.8% had children under the age of 18 living with them, 52.4% were married couples living together, 9.5% had a female householder with no husband present, and 33.3% were non-families. 23.8% of all households were made up of individuals, and 14.3% had someone living alone who was 65 years of age or older. The average household size was 2.24 and the average family size was 2.57.

In the town, the population was spread out, with 17.0% under the age of 18, 4.3% from 18 to 24, 25.5% from 25 to 44, 31.9% from 45 to 64, and 21.3% who were 65 years of age or older. The median age was 46 years. For every 100 females, there were 104.3 males. For every 100 females age 18 and over, there were 105.3 males.

The median income for a household in the town was $32,500, and the median income for a family was $31,875. Males had a median income of $28,750 versus $0 for females. The per capita income for the town was $13,208. There were 7.7% of families and 23.1% of the population living below the poverty line, including 28.6% of under eighteens and 50.0% of those over 64.

== Education ==
The town of Texola is served by Erick Public Schools district, which is headquartered in the city of Erick. The district operates two campuses, an elementary school and a high school.
