= Edwards Archaeological Site =

- Edwards Archeological Site
- U.S. National Register of Historic Places
- Nearest city: Carter, Oklahoma
- Area: 15 acres (6.1 ha)
- NRHP reference No.: 73001554
- Added to NRHP: September 19, 1973

The Edwards Archaeological Site is an archaeological site in Beckham County, Oklahoma, near the town of Carter. The site is part of the Edwards Complex, a culture which flourished in this area from about 1400 to 1650. The site was a Native American (Indian) village and included dwellings surrounded by a round fortification. Large amounts of waste material, such as tools and bones, have been collected from the site, indicating prolonged inhabitation by a large group. Pottery fragments and obsidian and turquoise artifacts found at the site suggest that its inhabitants traded with Puebloan peoples.

The predecessors in the region of the Edwards site were the Southern Plains villagers who depended upon a mixture of farming and hunting for subsistence. About 1400, the small Southern Plains settlements began to coalesce into larger villages, including the Edwards site, with greater emphasis on bison hunting than agriculture. The inhabitants of the Edwards site were likely Caddoan speaking ancestors of the Wichita people. The people of the Edwards site may have been, or related to, the people that Francisco Coronado called the Teyas when he encountered them in the Texas Panhandle in 1541. They may also have been or related to the people called Escanjaques or Aguacane encountered by Juan de Oñate in northern Oklahoma in 1601.

By the onset of the historic period about 1700, the people of the Edwards site were no longer present, possibly having migrated eastward as a result of pressure from the Apache who had expanded their range on the Great Plains.

The site was added to the National Register of Historic Places on September 19, 1973. To prevent desecration of the site, the exact location is not disclosed.
