= Beckham County Courthouse =

- U.S. National Register of Historic Places
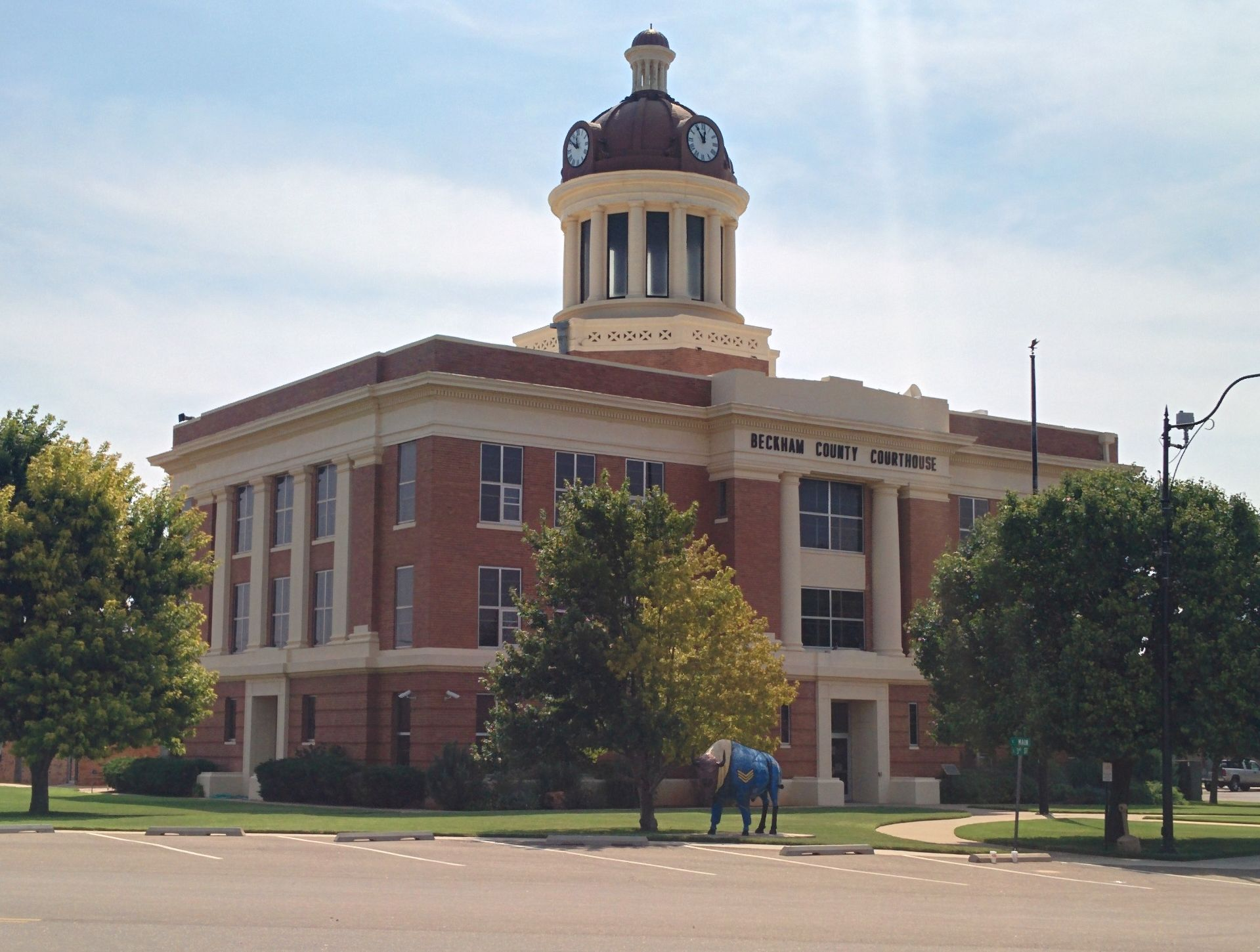
- Beckham County Courthouse in Sayre, Oklahoma, August 29, 2015

- Location within Oklahoma Location within the United States
- Interactive map showing the location of Beckham County Courthouse
- Location: Courthouse Sq., Sayre, Oklahoma
- Coordinates: 35°17′29″N 99°38′12″W
- Area: 1 acre (0.40 ha)
- Built: 1911
- Built by: Oklahoma Quarries & Construction Co.
- Architect: Layton, Smith, & Hawk
- MPS: County Courthouses of Oklahoma TR
- NRHP reference No.: 84002968
- Added to NRHP: August 23, 1984

The Beckham County Courthouse, located in Courthouse Square in Sayre, is the county courthouse of Beckham County, Oklahoma. The courthouse is considered a local landmark because it is the tallest building in Sayre. It is also one of the few courthouses in Oklahoma that has a dome.

== Description ==
The courthouse building was built in 1911, the courthouse was designed by the architecture firm of Layton, Smith & Hawk (Note: The architectural firm was a partnership of Solomon Andrew Layton, S. Wemyss Smith and James W. Hawk.) and constructed by Oklahoma Quarries & Construction Co. The courthouse sits on a 1 acre (4,000 m^{2}) parcel of land in downtown Sayre, at the intersection of Third and Walnut Streets. It is a three-story building measuring 66 feet (20 m) in the east-west direction and 99 feet (30 m) in the north-south direction. It is faced with tan bricks and stone. The east and west entrances to the courthouse each feature two Tuscan columns which span the second and third floors; the columns are flanked by brick pilasters. A dentillated cornice and a brick parapet encircle the building at its roof line.

Although the NRHP application did not list a particular style of architecture, another source claims that the building blends Neo-Classical and Second Renaissance Revival styles.

A large dome supported by twelve Doric columns rises from an octagonal base on the roof of the courthouse. A smaller dome, similarly styled and supported by twelve columns, rises from the top of the main dome. The large dome has flat panels for clocks facing four directions. (Note: The clock faces are shown in the 2015 photograph here. The NRHP application stated that there were no faces on the clocks. The clocks were added in 2007 to commemorate the centennial of Oklahoma.)

== Culture ==
The courthouse appeared in the film The Grapes of Wrath, a 1940 adaptation of the John Steinbeck novel. Families headed to California (such as the Joads of the film) passed through Sayre on U.S. Route 66, and many viewed the city as the start of the West.

The courthouse was added to the National Register of Historic Places on August 23, 1984.
