= Sayre Public Schools =

School district in Oklahoma

Coordinates: 35.313042°N 99.631688°W

Sayre High School

Location
- 800 East Hannah Drive; Sayre, (Beckham County), Oklahoma 73662; United States

Information
- Type: Public high school
- Principal: Bradley Coffman
- Staff: 10.63 (FTE)
- Enrollment: 190 (2023-24)
- Student to teacher ratio: 17.87
- Colors: Maroon and white
- Nickname: Eagles
- Website: Sayre High School

Sayre Public Schools is a school district serving the cities of Sayre and a portion of Elk City in Oklahoma. Mostly in Beckham County, the district extends into Greer and Roger Mills counties. The district also

It includes the following schools:

- Sayre Elementary School
- Sayre Middle School
- Sayre High School

== History ==
In 1994–5, the district was the defendant in a liability suit eventually decided by the Supreme Court of Oklahoma.

Superintendent Dee Wilhelm

Middle & High School Head Principal (6th-12th) Brad Coffman

Middle & High School Assistant Principal (6th-12th) Perry Shelby

Elementary Head Principal (PK-5th) Brook Plummer

Elementary Assistant Principal (PK-25th) Rylee Varnell
