= Magnolia Petroleum Company =

Defunct American energy corporation

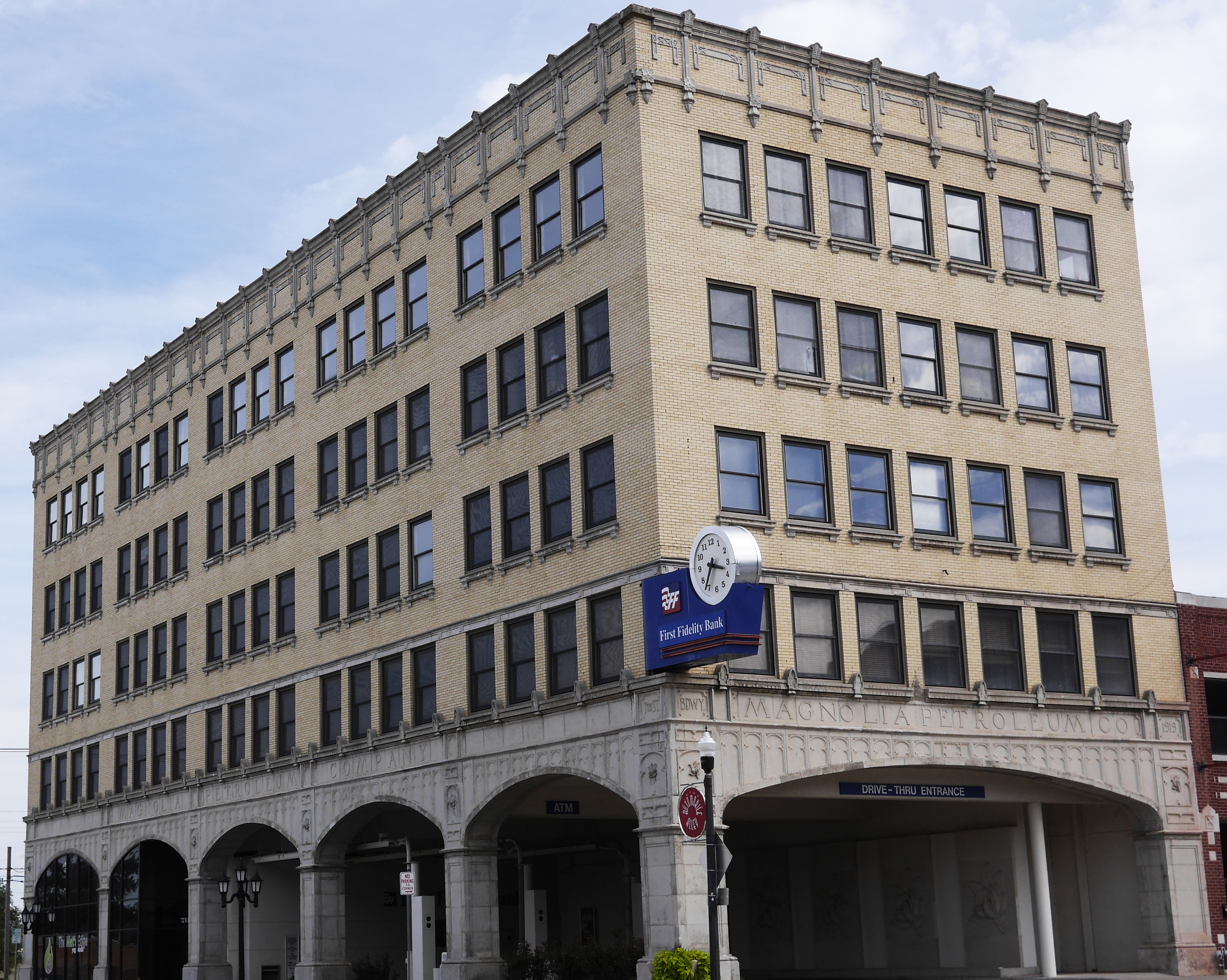
- The Magnolia Building in Oklahoma City
- Type: Subsidiary
- Industry: Petroleum
- Founded: April 24, 1911; 115 years ago
- Founder: Sealy family
- Defunct: 1959; 67 years ago
- Fate: Incorporated into the 'Mobil' division of Socony-Vacuum Co. in 1959
- Headquarters: Galveston, Texas, United States
- Products: Gasoline
- Parent: Standard Oil of New York

The Magnolia Petroleum Company was an early twentieth-century petroleum company in Texas. The company was established in 1911, being later acquired by the Standard Oil of New York, which operated it as a wholly owned subsidiary until its demise in 1959.

== History ==
The company was founded on April 24, 1911, by John H. Sealy, who named the company after his favorite aunt, Magnolia Sealy. This was part of his investment diversification following the Spindletop gusher in January 1901. The company began with the purchase of the Navarro Oil company (former J. S. Cullinan Company), including its refinery in the East Texas Oil Field, and the Security Oil company. Magnolia became a consolidation of several other companies operating in the Corsicana oil fields. Standard Oil of New York ("Socony") exchanged its stock for all of the Magnolia stock (except seven shares for the Directors) in December 1925 though it continued to operate as an affiliate of Socony. The firm then merged with Vacuum Oil Company in 1931, becoming "Socony-Vacuum Oil Company".

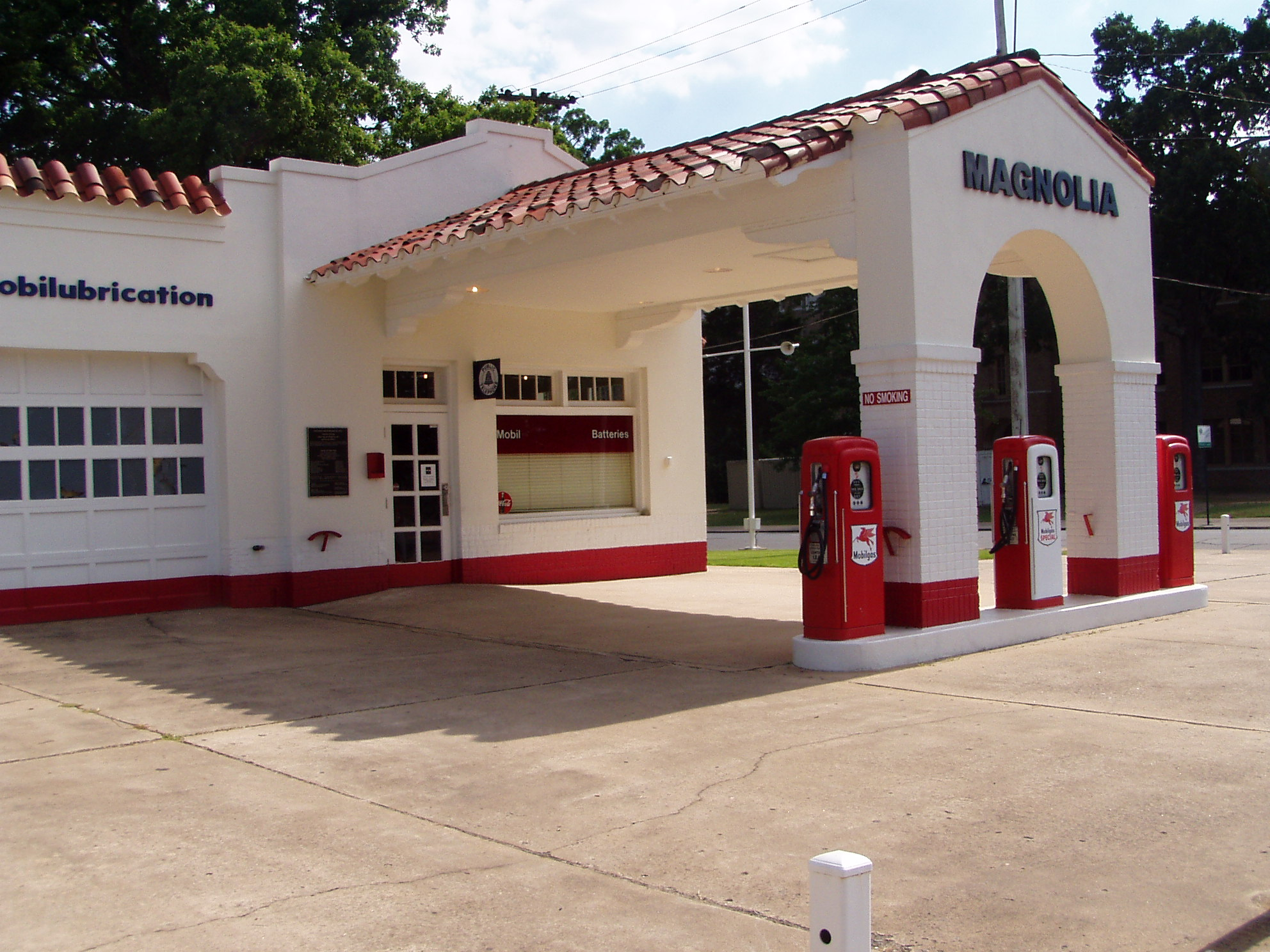
Former Magnolia service station in Little Rock, Arkansas, photographed in 2018

Magnolia Petroleum continued to operate as a subsidiary of Socony-Vacuum. In 1959, Magnolia was fully incorporated into the Mobil division of Socony-Vacuum, which later changed its name to 'Socony Mobil' and, ultimately to Mobil Oil Corporation. In 1999, Mobil merged with Exxon to form ExxonMobil, one of the largest oil companies in the world. Preferred Magnolia stock was eventually converted to ExxonMobil stock, making the Sealy family (John Sealy Estate, Sealy Foundation) some of the largest shareholders of ExxonMobil.

The acquisition proved to be one of the most important mergers that brought the majors in to develop the Corsican and Beaumont area into one of the largest refineries in the world.

The emblem of Magnolia Petroleum Company was originally a magnolia blossom. When Socony merged with Vacuum in 1931, Socony-Vacuum as well as Magnolia began using Vacuum's Brand of ‘Flying Red Horse’ petroleum products a.k.a. red Pegasus logo, as well as the Mobil name for its products (Mobilgas, Mobiloil, etc.).

In 1924, Magnolia Petroleum launched Beaumont's first radio station, KFDM ("Kall For Dependable Magnolene"), which would be leased to the Sabine Broadcasting Company in 1932 and sold to the Beaumont Broadcasting Corporation in 1937. KFDM broadcast at 315.6 metres (c. 950 kHz) on Tuesday and Friday evenings, with religious services heard Sunday morning and evening.

An unrelated Oklahoma-based company of the same name has been operating since 2008.

== See also ==
- Magnolia Hotel (originally the "Magnolia Petroleum Building")
- Magnolia Service Station
- ExxonMobil Beaumont Refinery
