= Sayre Downtown Historic District =

Historic district in Oklahoma, United States

- U.S. National Register of Historic Places
- U.S. Historic district
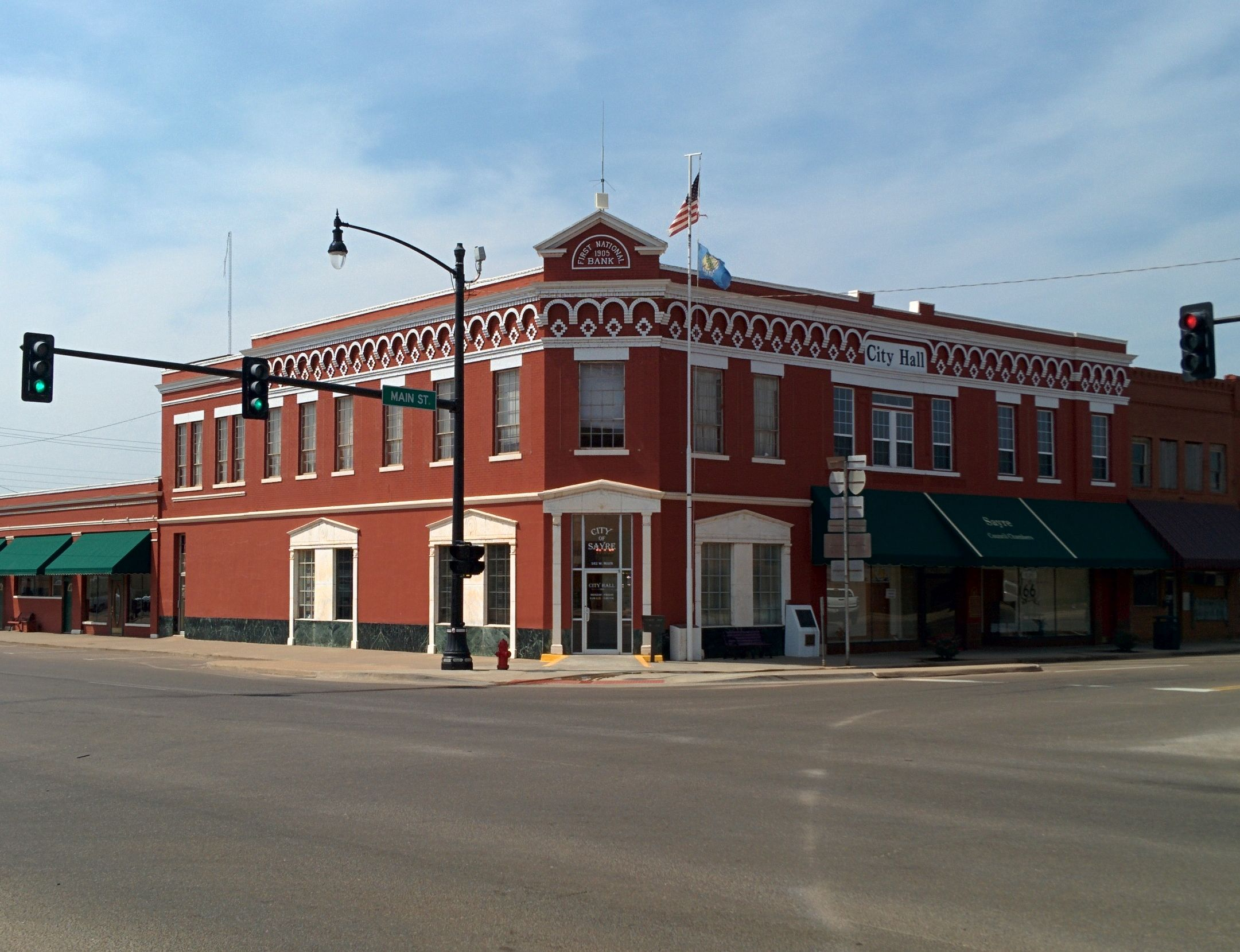
- Sayre Downtown Historic District - August 29, 2015

- Location within Oklahoma Location within the United States
- Location: Main and Fourth Sts., Sayre, Oklahoma
- Coordinates: 35°17′29″N 99°38′22″W
- Area: 8 acres (3.2 ha)
- Architectural style: Commercial
- NRHP reference No.: 02000972
- Added to NRHP: December 9, 2002

The Sayre Downtown Historic District is a commercial historic district located in downtown Sayre, in the U.S. state of Oklahoma. The district comprises a three-block area of Main and 4th Streets; it includes 39 buildings, of which 24 are contributing buildings. The oldest buildings in the district date from between 1903 and 1909, when a building boom replaced Sayre's frame downtown buildings with brick Commercial style structures. By the 1920s, the downtown area had reached its current size, and most of the buildings in the district had been built. In the 1920s, U.S. Route 66 was routed through the district, increasing traffic for local businesses. Sayre's Classical Revival post office, a contributing property, was constructed in 1938; the post office includes a Works Progress Administration mural painted in 1940. The downtown remained prosperous until the 1950s, when population decline and the bypassing of Route 66 led to a decrease in commercial activity.

== NRHP Listing ==
The district was added to the National Register of Historic Places on December 9, 2002. It qualified under Categories A and C. No properties within the district have been individually listed on the NRHP.
