= J. W. Danner House =

Historic house in Oklahoma, United States

- U.S. National Register of Historic Places
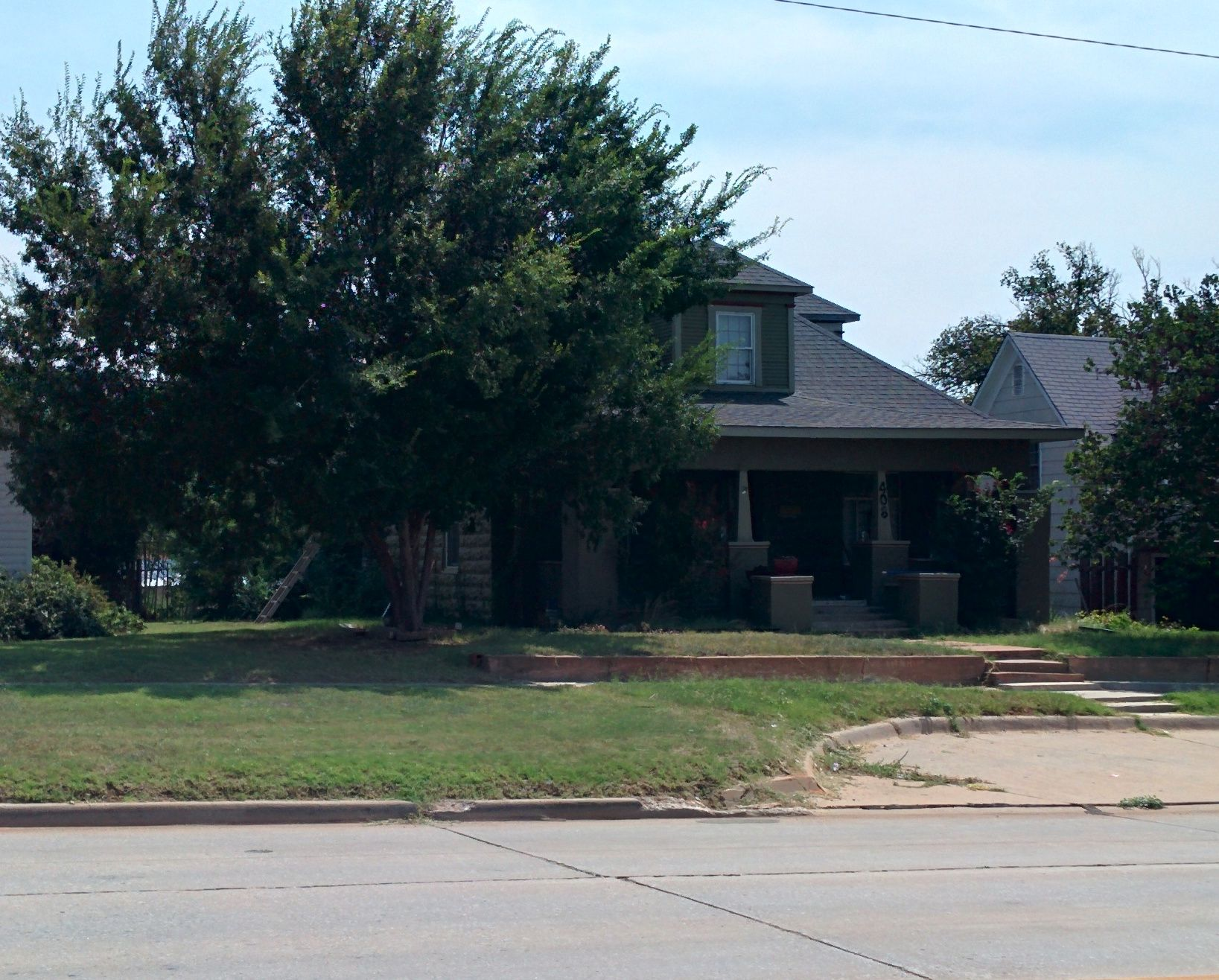

- Location within Oklahoma Location within the United States
- Location: 408 N. Fourth St., Sayre, Oklahoma
- Coordinates: 35°17′42″N 99°38′22″W
- Area: less than one acre
- Built: 1905
- Built by: Danner, J. W.
- NRHP reference No.: 02000169
- Added to NRHP: March 13, 2002

The J. W. Danner House is a historic house located at 408 N. Fourth St. in Sayre, Oklahoma. J. W. Danner, one of the first landowners in Sayre, built the house for himself circa 1905; it is one of the city's oldest buildings. Danner built the house using triangular concrete blocks made from a block machine, a previously unseen construction style. He later used his home as a model for several other triangular block buildings in Sayre, giving the city a locally distinctive building style.

The house was added to the National Register of Historic Places on March 13, 2002.
