= Hedlund Motor Company Building =

- U.S. National Register of Historic Places
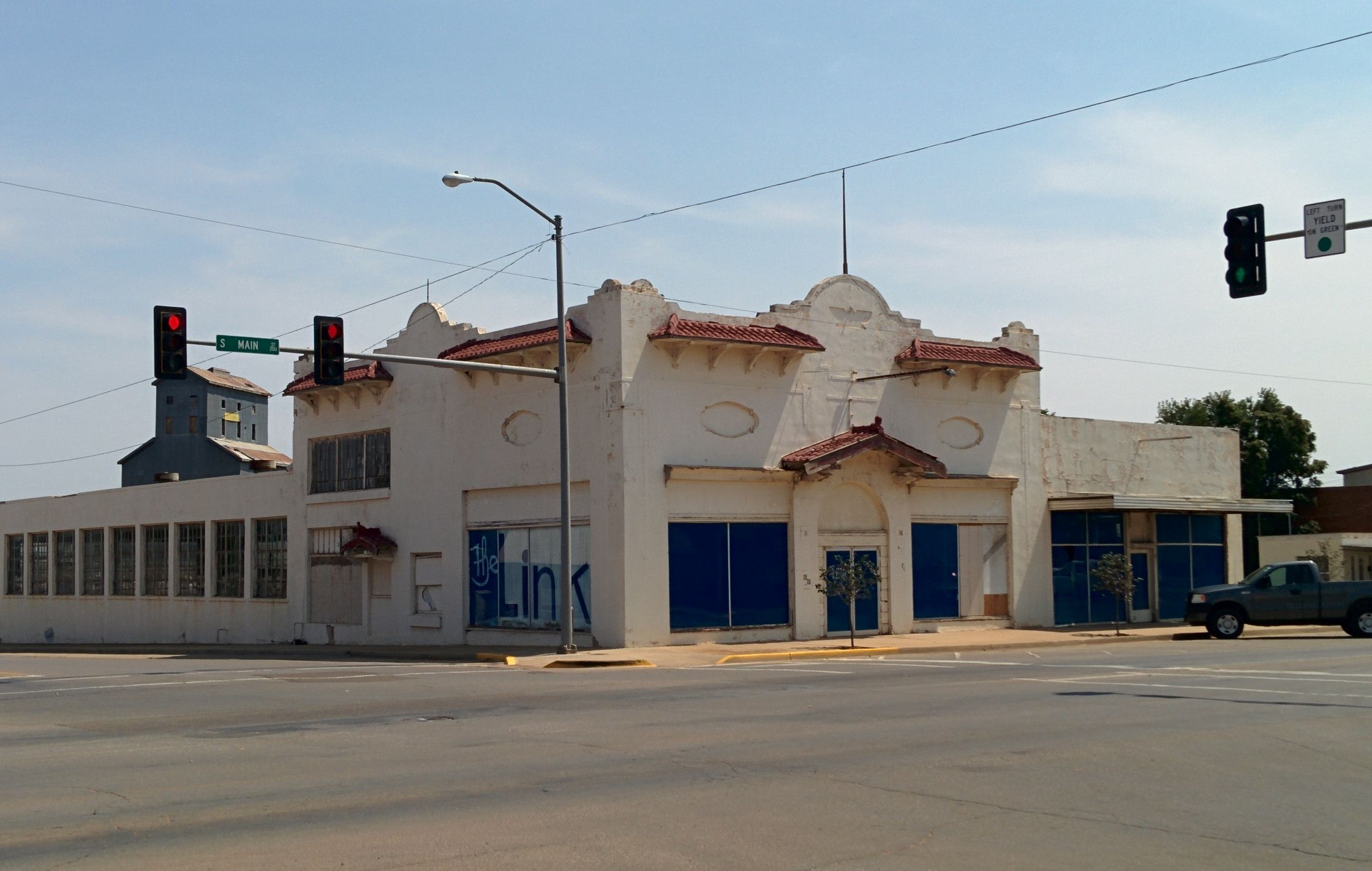

- Location within Oklahoma Location within the United States
- Location: 206 S. Main St., Elk City, Oklahoma
- Coordinates: 35°24′35″N 99°24′15″W
- Area: 1 acre (0.40 ha)
- Built: 1918
- Architect: Jonas Hedlund
- Architectural style: Mission Revival
- NRHP reference No.: 83002072
- Added to NRHP: September 22, 1983

The Hedlund Motor Company Building is a historic commercial building located at 206 South Main Street in Elk City, Oklahoma.

== Description and history ==
The building was constructed in 1918 for the Hedlund Motor Company; founded in 1913, the company was Oklahoma's second-oldest Ford dealership. The Mission Revival building is the only commercial structure in Elk City which uses the style. The building features stucco walls inlaid with clay tiles along the second floor and at the corners and centers of the main facades. Two tiled roof sections project from each facade; the roof sections are lined with brackets on their undersides. Curved parapets run along the roof line of both facades.

The building was added to the National Register of Historic Places on September 22, 1983.
