= Whited Grist Mill =

- U.S. National Register of Historic Places
- Location within Oklahoma Location within the United States
- Location: Old Town Museum, W. 3rd St. and N. Pioneer Rd. Elk City, Oklahoma
- Coordinates: 35°24′45″N 99°26′5″W
- Area: 1 acre (0.40 ha)
- Built: 1903-04
- Built by: Whited, Ruben
- NRHP reference No.: 76001554
- Added to NRHP: January 1, 1976

The Whited Grist Mill is a historic gristmill located at the National Route 66 & Transportation Museum in Elk City, Oklahoma. Ruben Whited built the mill in 1903–04; his family operated the mill for its entire existence. The mill ground corn for Elk City's residents; a sign painted on the outside advertises "CORN GROUND INTO MEAL OR CHOPS AT ANY TIME". A 1928 addition brought a flour mill to the complex as well. The mill closed in 1944 due to replacement machinery shortages during World War II; it was the only gristmill to ever operate in Elk City. In 1985, the mill moved from its original site at 306 E. 7th St. to its current location.

The mill was added to the National Register of Historic Places on January 1, 1976.
