= Sayre City Park =

- U.S. National Register of Historic Places
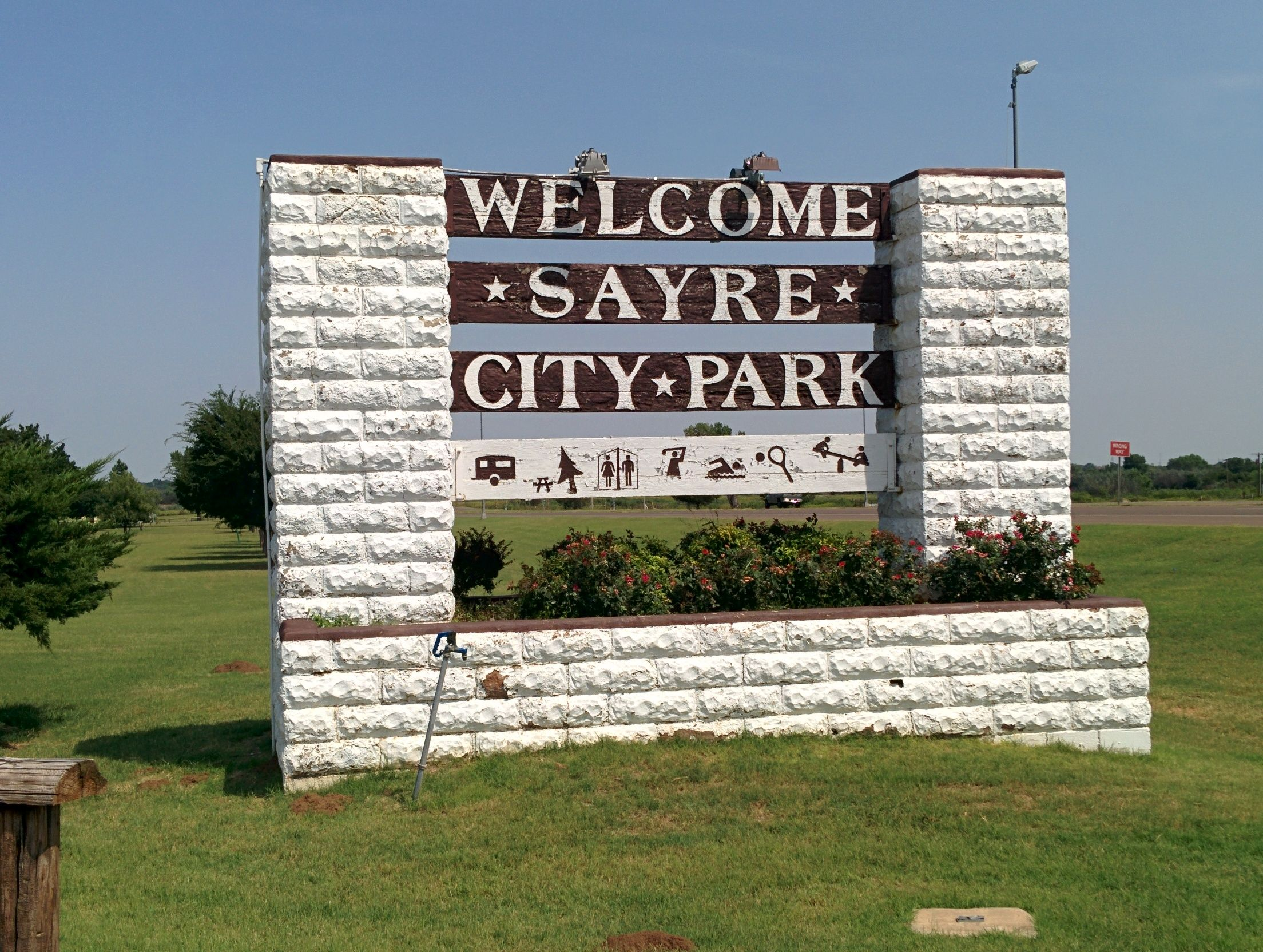

- Location within Oklahoma Location within the United States
- Location: 200 yds S of jct of E1200 Rd. and N1870 Rd., Sayre, Oklahoma
- Coordinates: 35°16′28″N 99°38′43″W
- Area: 6 acres (2.4 ha)
- Built: 1940
- Built by: Works Progress Administration
- Architect: Willis, J.N.
- Architectural style: Pueblo Revival
- NRHP reference No.: 04000127
- Added to NRHP: March 3, 2004

The Sayre City Park is a public park located along historic U.S. Route 66 on the south end of Sayre, Oklahoma. The park formally opened in 1940; however, the land had been owned by the city and used informally as a park for several years prior. The Works Progress Administration built the park's structures according to plans designed by J.N. Willis. The park's bathhouse and swimming pool, the dominant features of the park, have a Pueblo Revival design with ornamental vigas. Other park features include a miniature golf course, a gazebo, and tennis courts. The park attracted both locals and travelers on Route 66, who regularly camped in the park. A local business district also developed around the park, primarily to serve tourists.

The park was added to the National Register of Historic Places on March 3, 2004.
