= Sayre Champlin Service Station =

- U.S. National Register of Historic Places
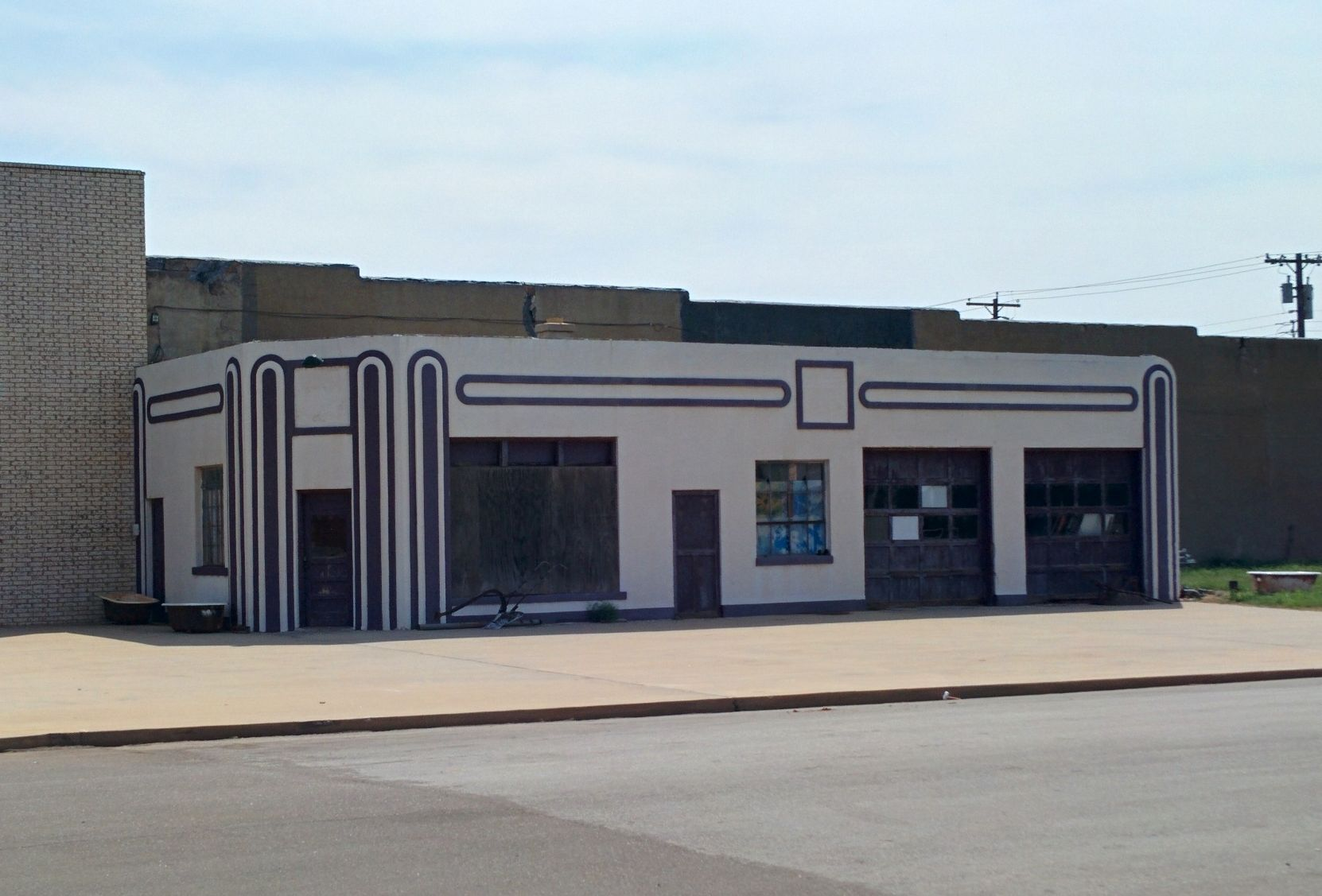
- Sayre Champlin Service Station, August 2015

- Location within Oklahoma Location within the United States
- Location: 126 West Main, Sayre, Oklahoma
- Coordinates: 35°17′27″N 99°38′27″W
- Area: less than one acre
- Built: 1934
- Built by: Champlin Refining Company
- Architectural style: Streamline Moderne
- MPS: Route 66 and Associated Resources in Oklahoma AD MPS
- NRHP reference No.: 04000130
- Added to NRHP: March 3, 2004

The Sayre Champlin Service Station is a historic service station located on old U.S. Route 66 in Sayre, Oklahoma. The station, an affiliate of the Champlin Refining Company, was built in 1934; it replaced an older station which predated Route 66. Its main building has a Streamline Moderne design which features oval pilasters and horizontal sections, plate glass and multi-light windows, and a contrasting color scheme. The station provided both gasoline and automobile services to Route 66 travelers; in addition, the large tanker trucks used to supply the station's gasoline contributed to the highway's traffic. After Interstate 40 bypassed Route 66 in 1958, business at the station declined, and it closed permanently in 1967.

The station was added to the National Register of Historic Places on March 3, 2004.
