= First National Bank (Erick, Oklahoma) =

- U.S. National Register of Historic Places
- Location within Oklahoma Location within the United States
- Location: 101 S. Main St., Erick, Oklahoma
- Coordinates: 35°12′53″N 99°52′1″W
- Area: Less than one acre
- Built: 1902; 124 years ago, Bricked in 1907
- NRHP reference No.: 79001987
- Added to NRHP: December 11, 1979

The First National Bank is a historic two-frame building, constructed in 1907, and located at 101 S. Main St. in Erick, Oklahoma. While the building was primarily used as the city's bank, it also housed a barbershop in the rear and at one point had a second barbershop in the basement. The second floor held various professional offices, including the courts of local justices of the peace. The bank operated there until 1968, during which time it served as Erick's commercial center.

After the bank closed, the 100th Meridian Museum occupied the building; the museum commemorates the survey of the 100th meridian west, a benchmark of which is set in the bank's wall.

The bank was added to the National Register of Historic Places on December 11, 1979.
