= Magnolia Service Station =

- U.S. National Register of Historic Places
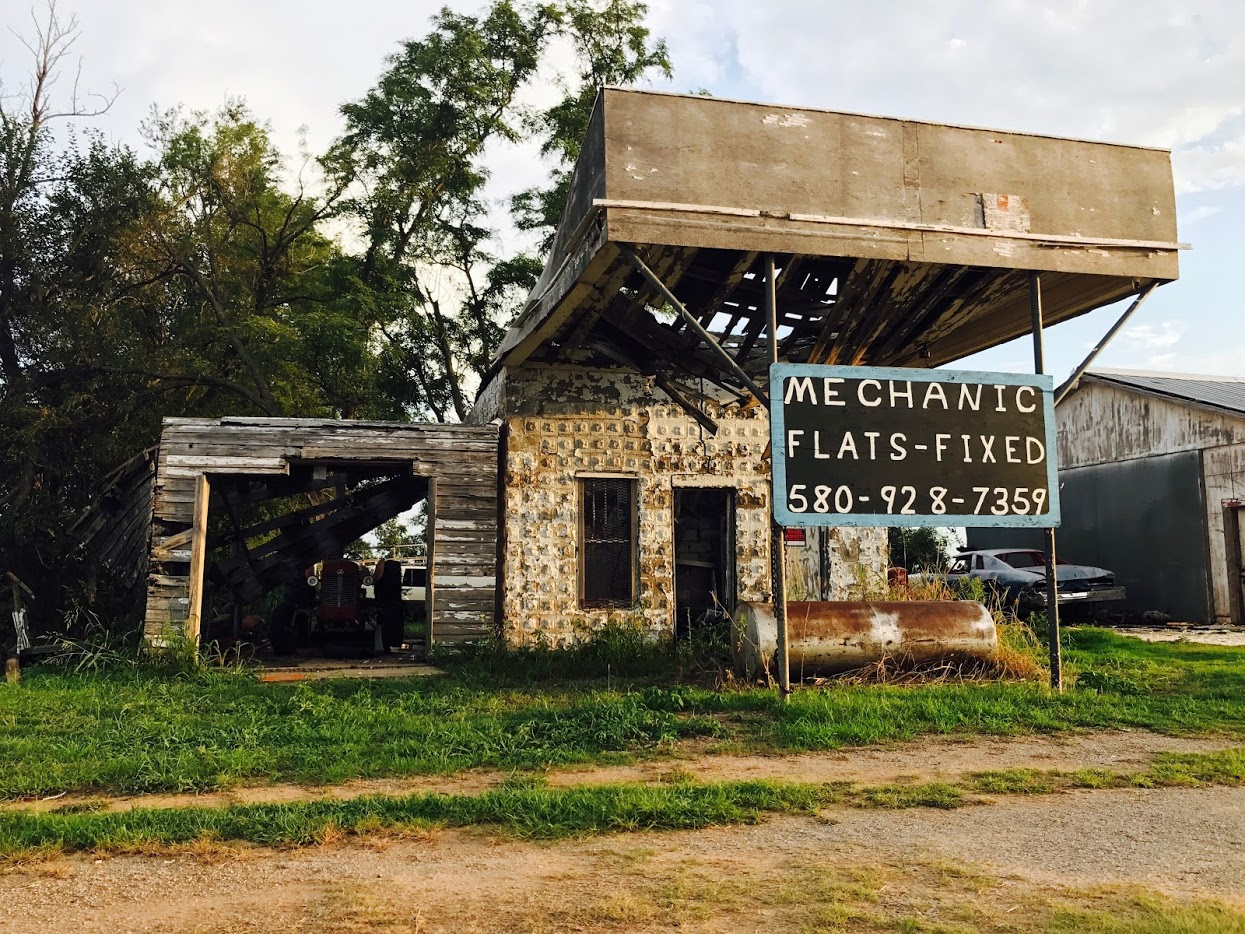

- Location within Oklahoma Location within the United States
- Location: Jct. of Elm St. and US 66, SW corner, Texola, Oklahoma
- Coordinates: 35°13′8″N 99°59′29″W
- Area: less than one acre
- Built: c. 1930
- Built by: Magnolia Petrolium Co.
- MPS: Route 66 in Oklahoma MPS
- NRHP reference No.: 95000028
- Added to NRHP: February 23, 1995

The Magnolia Service Station is a historic service station located on Old U.S. Route 66 in Texola, Oklahoma. The station, an affiliate of the Magnolia Petroleum Company, opened circa 1930. The station was one of the westernmost in Oklahoma and became one of the first stops for eastbound travelers to buy gas and auto services in the state. The main building of the service station is representative of the "house" style of filling station; such stations resembled small houses in order to fit into residential areas.

The service station was added to the National Register of Historic Places on February 23, 1995.

== History ==
The station opened in 1930, first owned by Albert Hutto, who later sold it to Frank Skinner. The station sold Magnolia Petroleum products until 1955, when it was sold again and began carrying Phillips 66 products, before closing in the 1960s. The structure was originally built with just the central block building, with the canopy and side garage added on later. The sign on the structure, advertising a former mechanic shop, had its lettering removed by 2019.

== Condition ==
Despite its historic status, the building remains in an advanced state of decay. As of 2026, the side garage had been completely removed after being damaged for many years, the canopy has partially collapsed, and the interior is also in extremely poor condition. There is another (restored) Magnolia service station on U.S. Route 385 in downtown Vega, Texas, and another on Daisy L. Gatson Bates Drive in Little Rock, Arkansas.

== Other Magnolia service stations ==
Several restored Magnolia service stations can be found in the United States. Some examples are located in Vega, Texas (on U.S. Route 385), in Shamrock, Texas (on East 2nd Street), and in Little Rock, Arkansas (on Daisy L. Gatson Bates Drive).
