= Sayre, Oklahoma =

City in Oklahoma, US

- City
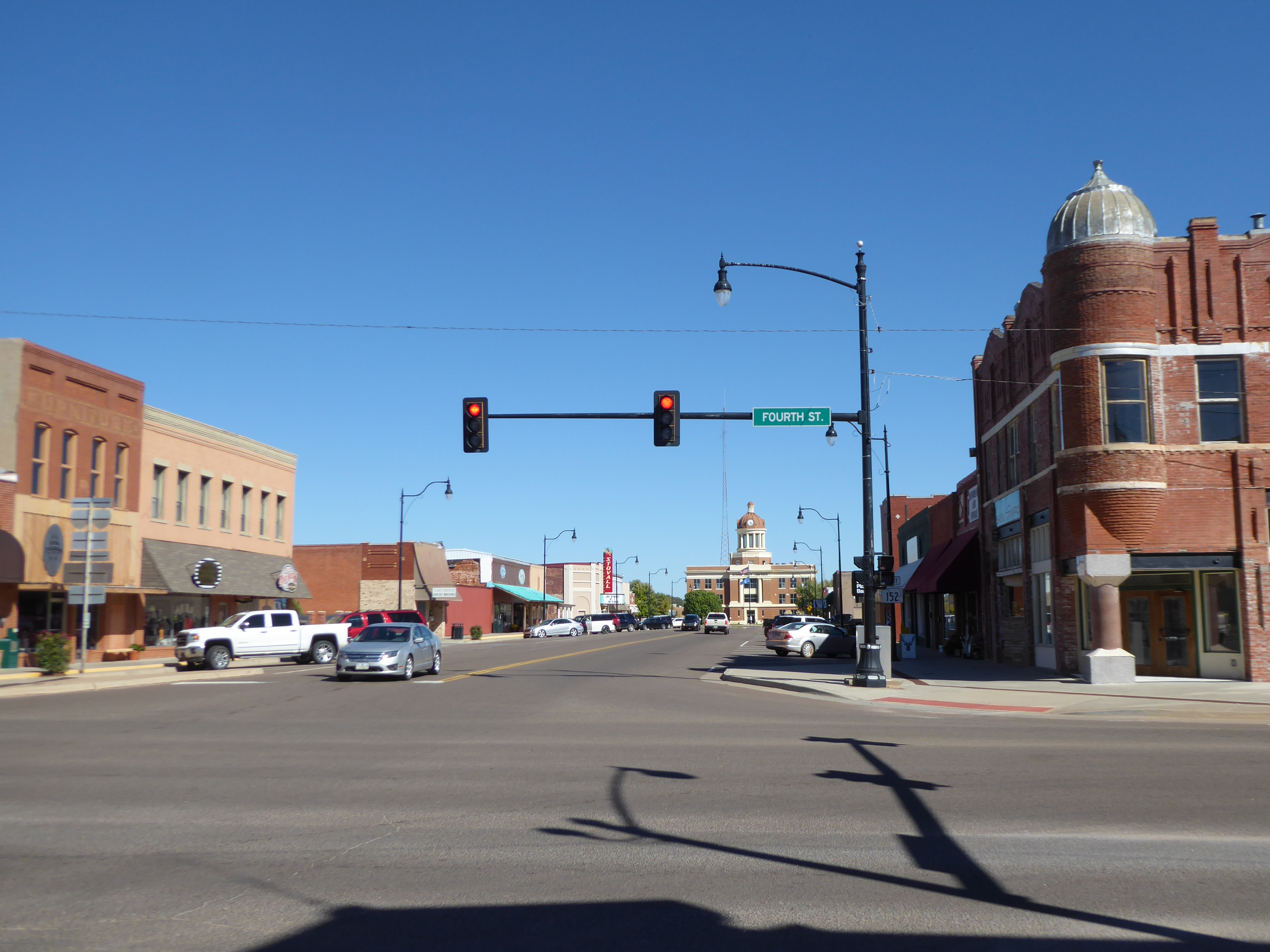
- Buildings in Sayre, 2016
- Motto: "Main Street On Historic Route (66)"
- Location in Beckham County and the state of Oklahoma

- Location in Oklahoma Location in the United States
- Coordinates: 35°17′48″N 99°37′43″W
- Country: United States
- State: Oklahoma
- County: Beckham

Government
  - Type: Aldermanic

Area
  - Total: 5.41 sq mi (14.00 km^{2})
  - Land: 5.39 sq mi (13.95 km^{2})
  - Water: 0.019 sq mi (0.05 km^{2})
- Elevation: 1,893 ft (577 m)

Population (2020)
  - Total: 4,809
  - Density: 892.8/sq mi (344.72/km^{2})
- Time zone: UTC-6 (Central (CST))
  - Summer (DST): UTC-5 (CDT)
- ZIP code: 73662
- Area code: 580
- FIPS code: 40-65700
- GNIS feature ID: 2411836
- Website: www.sayreok.net

Sayre is a city in and the county seat of Beckham County, in western Oklahoma, United States. It is halfway between Oklahoma City and Amarillo on Interstate 40 and the former U.S. Route 66. The population was 4,809 at the time of the 2020 census, up from 4,375 at the 2010 census, and the largest population ever recorded by a census since Sayre's founding.

== History ==
After the Civil War, Congress wanted to stimulate the economy and aid the growth of the nation. One way that they achieved this was to promote the building of the western railroads. Upon completion of the Union Pacific-Central Pacific joining in 1869 with the Golden Spike, other railroads trying to capitalize on commerce and trade also began crossing the western country. This included the Great Northern and Burlington in the far north, and the Southern Pacific on the extreme southern border.

Eventually this would lead to rails crossing Indian Territory, present-day Oklahoma, around the start of the 20th century. A new rail line was extended from Weatherford to Texola by McCabe & Steen Contractors in July 1901. Entrepreneurs would buy land near where the new tracks were being laid, and also near a source of water. The Choctaw Town Site and Improvement Company did this, and when the Choctaw, Oklahoma and Gulf Railroad crossed the North Fork of the Red River in Western Indian Territory an instant town sprang up, which incorporated on 14 September 1901.

The Choctaw Townsite & Improvement Company began selling lots to new "Sooners" arriving to start a new life. The seeds of a new town were sown, businessmen came to sell their wares to the new town folk, and within one year the town's population was up to around 1,000. Pennsylvanian Robert Heysham Sayre, a stockholder of the railroad, gave his name to the newly formed town in 1901.

The Chicago, Rock Island and Pacific Railway Company (called the "Rock Island") leased the new line. The Rock Island would complete its march to the Pacific by filling in the line to Tucumcari, New Mexico.

During the period of 1901–1907, Sayre was part of Roger Mills County in Oklahoma Territory. At the time Oklahoma became a state, Beckham County was created and Sayre, which was within the boundary of Beckham County, was named as the temporary county seat. An election in 1908 confirmed Sayre as the permanent seat, with voters preferring it to the town of Erick. The Beckham County Courthouse was completed in 1911, and is still in service over a century later. It is listed on the National Register of Historic Places.

The discovery of oil and gas nearby caused the population to boom between 1920 and 1930. In the 1930s U.S. Route 66, a dream forwarded by fellow Oklahoman Cyrus Avery, would come through Sayre, cementing the town's fate to fuel the cars and feed the people exploring the country.

In 1940 film director John Ford used Sayre's Beckham County Courthouse in the film The Grapes of Wrath, based on the famous book by John Steinbeck.

During the 1970s Sayre and the surrounding area benefited from the natural gas and oil development in the Panhandle-Hugoton field, the largest-volume gas field in the United States, and the world's largest known source of helium. Between 1973 and 1993 the field produced over 8 trillion cubic feet (230,000,000 m³) of gas.

== Geography ==
Sayre is located on the North Fork of the Red River, at an elevation of 1,800 feet (550 m) and 128 miles (206 km) west of Oklahoma City. The area is dominated by low rolling red clay hills.

According to the United States Census Bureau, the city has a total area of 5.6 square miles (14.5 km^{2}), of which 0.019 square miles (0.05 km^{2}), or 0.36%, is water.

== Demographics ==
Historical population
Census	Pop.	Note	%±
1910	1,881		—
1920	1,703		−9.5%
1930	3,157		85.4%
1940	3,037		−3.8%
1950	3,362		10.7%
1960	2,913		−13.4%
1970	2,712		−6.9%
1980	3,177		17.1%
1990	2,881		−9.3%
2000	4,114		42.8%
2010	4,375		6.3%
2020	4,809		9.9%
U.S. Decennial Census

=== 2020 census ===
As of the 2020 census, Sayre had a population of 4,809. The median age was 37.9 years. 12.4% of residents were under the age of 18 and 11.7% of residents were 65 years of age or older. For every 100 females there were 258.9 males, and for every 100 females age 18 and over there were 300.8 males age 18 and over.

0% of residents lived in urban areas, while 100.0% lived in rural areas.

There were 1,095 households in Sayre, of which 27.7% had children under the age of 18 living in them. Of all households, 41.6% were married-couple households, 21.1% were households with a male householder and no spouse or partner present, and 30.9% were households with a female householder and no spouse or partner present. About 34.6% of all households were made up of individuals and 15.2% had someone living alone who was 65 years of age or older.

There were 1,452 housing units, of which 24.6% were vacant. Among occupied housing units, 60.5% were owner-occupied and 39.5% were renter-occupied. The homeowner vacancy rate was 5.5% and the rental vacancy rate was 19.5%.

Racial composition as of the 2020 census
Race	Percent
White	66.7%
Black or African American	17.0%
American Indian and Alaska Native	5.9%
Asian	0.4%
Native Hawaiian and Other Pacific Islander	0.1%
Some other race	5.6%
Two or more races	4.4%
Hispanic or Latino (of any race)	8.8%

=== 2000 census ===
As of the 2000 census, there were 4,114 people, 1,132 households, and 678 families residing in the city.

The population density was 1,215.9 inhabitants per square mile (469.5/km^{2}). There were 1,399 housing units at an average density of 413.5 units per square mile (159.7 units/km^{2}). The racial makeup of the city was 74.99% White, 18.25% African American, 2.53% Native American, 0.41% Asian, 1.92% from other races, and 1.90% from two or more races. Hispanic or Latino of any race were 5.35% of the population.

There were 1,132 households, out of which 26.7% had children under the age of 18 living with them, 45.8% were married couples living together, 10.6% had a female householder with no husband present, and 40.1% were non-families. 36.5% of all households were made up of individuals, and 18.9% had someone living alone who was 65 years of age or older. The average household size was 2.20 and the average family size was 2.87.

In the city, the population was spread out, with 14.6% under the age of 18, 14.0% from 18 to 24, 40.9% from 25 to 44, 16.0% from 45 to 64, and 14.5% who were 65 years of age or older. The median age was 35 years. For every 100 females, there were 197.0 males. For every 100 females age 18 and over, there were 216.8 males.

The median income for a household in the city was $21,713, and the median income for a family was $30,000. Males had a median income of $22,167 versus $18,147 for females. The per capita income for the city was $10,378. About 15.9% of families and 20.7% of the population were below the poverty line, including 26.1% of those under age 18 and 14.0% of those age 65 or over.

== Economy ==
Sayre's economy has been based on agriculture and the production of oil and gas. By the 1930s, the town had five oil companies and one gasoline plant in operation. United Carbon Company built a carbon black plant there. Circa 2000 the Flying J truck stop opened on a 28-acre (11 ha) plot of land along Interstate 40 in Sayre; As of 2001 it paid $150,000 in annual sales taxes and had 117 employees. The city government had purchased the land and sold it to the developer at cost in order to attract the development.

The North Fork Correctional Facility, a privately owned, medium-security prison opened in 1998. This prison had 270 employees as of 2001, and that year Peter T. Kilborn of The New York Times wrote that the prison "is responsible for lifting Sayre's spirits and reigniting its economy." Circa 2003 the community experienced economic issues when prisoners from Wisconsin were recalled from the prison.

== Education ==
Southwestern Oklahoma State University at Sayre or SWOSU@Sayre, is an accredited junior college serving western Oklahoma. It was founded in 1938 as Sayre Junior College and merged with SWOSU by an act of the Oklahoma Legislature in 1987.

Western Technology Center, Sayre campus provides the opportunity for adults and high school students to get occupationally-specific training. Sayre Public Schools is a member of the WTC district.

Sayre Public Schools is a school district serving the cities of Sayre and Elk City in Oklahoma. It includes the following schools:

- Sayre Elementary School
- Sayre Middle School
- Sayre High School

In 1994–5, the district was the defendant in a liability suit eventually decided by the Supreme Court of Oklahoma.

== Government ==
Sayre has an aldermanic form of city government.

== NRHP listings ==
The following sites in and around Sayre are listed on the National Register of Historic Places:

- Beckham County Courthouse (NR 84002968)
- J. W. Danner House (NR 02000169)
- Sayre Champlin Service Station (NR 04000130)
- Sayre Rock Island Depot (also known as the Shortgrass Country Museum, NR 00000654)
- Sayre City Park (NR 04000127)
- Sayre Downtown Historic District (NR 02000972)

== Notable people ==
- Maxie Anderson, hot air balloonist, member of the first crew to cross the Atlantic Ocean in a balloon
- Barry Christian, politician
- Leo Meyer, served as mayor of Sayre from 1905 to 1906. He moved to Guthrie in 1907 when he was chosen as the new state's first assistant Secretary of State.
- Jerry Drake Varnell, terrorist, currently incarcerated
