= Storm House =

Historic house in Oklahoma, United States

- U.S. National Register of Historic Places
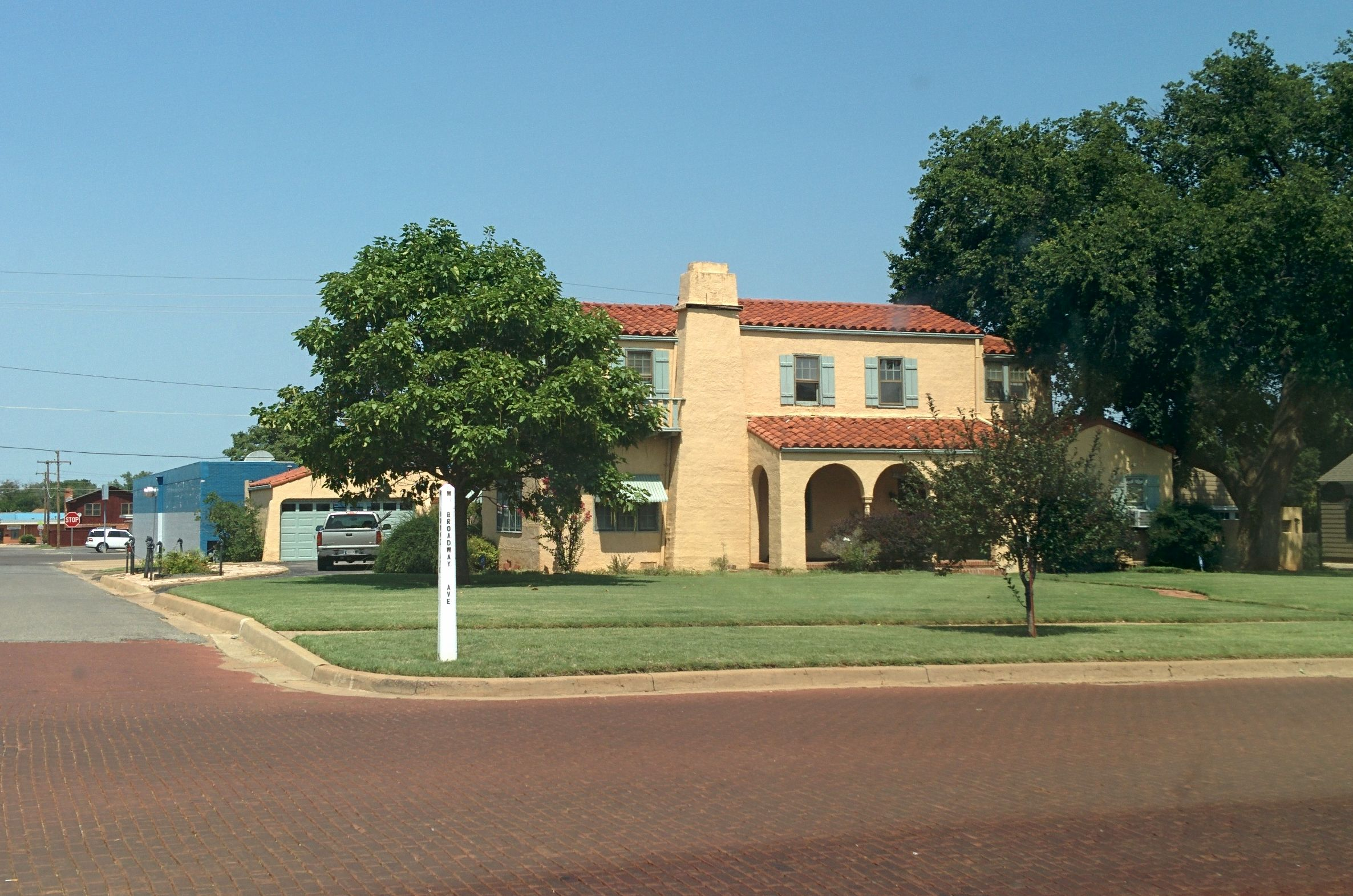

- Location within Oklahoma Location within the United States
- Location: 721 W. Broadway, Elk City, Oklahoma
- Coordinates: 35°24′40″N 99°24′45″W
- Area: less than one acre
- Built: 1930
- Built by: Martin, G. E.
- Architect: Engwall, P. A.
- Architectural style: Spanish Colonial Revival
- NRHP reference No.: 83004162
- Added to NRHP: October 6, 1983

The Storm House is a historic house located at 721 W. Broadway in Elk City, Oklahoma.

== Description and history ==
The house was built in 1930 for the locally significant Storm family. Architect P. A. Engwall designed the house in the Spanish Colonial Revival style. The walls of the house are stucco, and its roof is covered in red clay tiles. The front porch is arcaded, while a second-floor porch features a wooden balustrade and brackets. The house's library, which projects from the end of the second floor, is shaped like a Spanish ship and features an oriel window.

The house was added to the National Register of Historic Places on October 6, 1983.
