= West Winds Motel =

- U.S. National Register of Historic Places
- Location within Oklahoma Location within the United States
- Location: 623 Roger Miller Blvd., Erick, Oklahoma
- Coordinates: 35°12′55″N 99°52′23″W
- Area: less than one acre
- Built: c. 1948
- Architectural style: Mission Revival
- MPS: Route 66 and Associated Resources in Oklahoma AD MPS
- NRHP reference No.: 04000520
- Added to NRHP: May 27, 2004

The West Winds Motel is a historic motel located on old U.S. Route 66 in Erick, Oklahoma. The motel opened in the mid-1940s to serve travelers on Route 66; at the time, tourism drove Erick's economy, and the motel was one of several in the city. The motel had a typical motor court layout with two lodging buildings and an office forming a "U" shape around a central courtyard. The lodging buildings have a Mission Revival design with stucco walls and red metal roofs designed to resemble tile. The motel units have individual garage spaces in front of their entrances, a style which was common in the 1930s and 1940s but fell out of favor in later years.

The motel was added to the National Register of Historic Places on May 27, 2004.

== See also ==
- List of motels
