= Sayre station (Oklahoma) =

Sayre
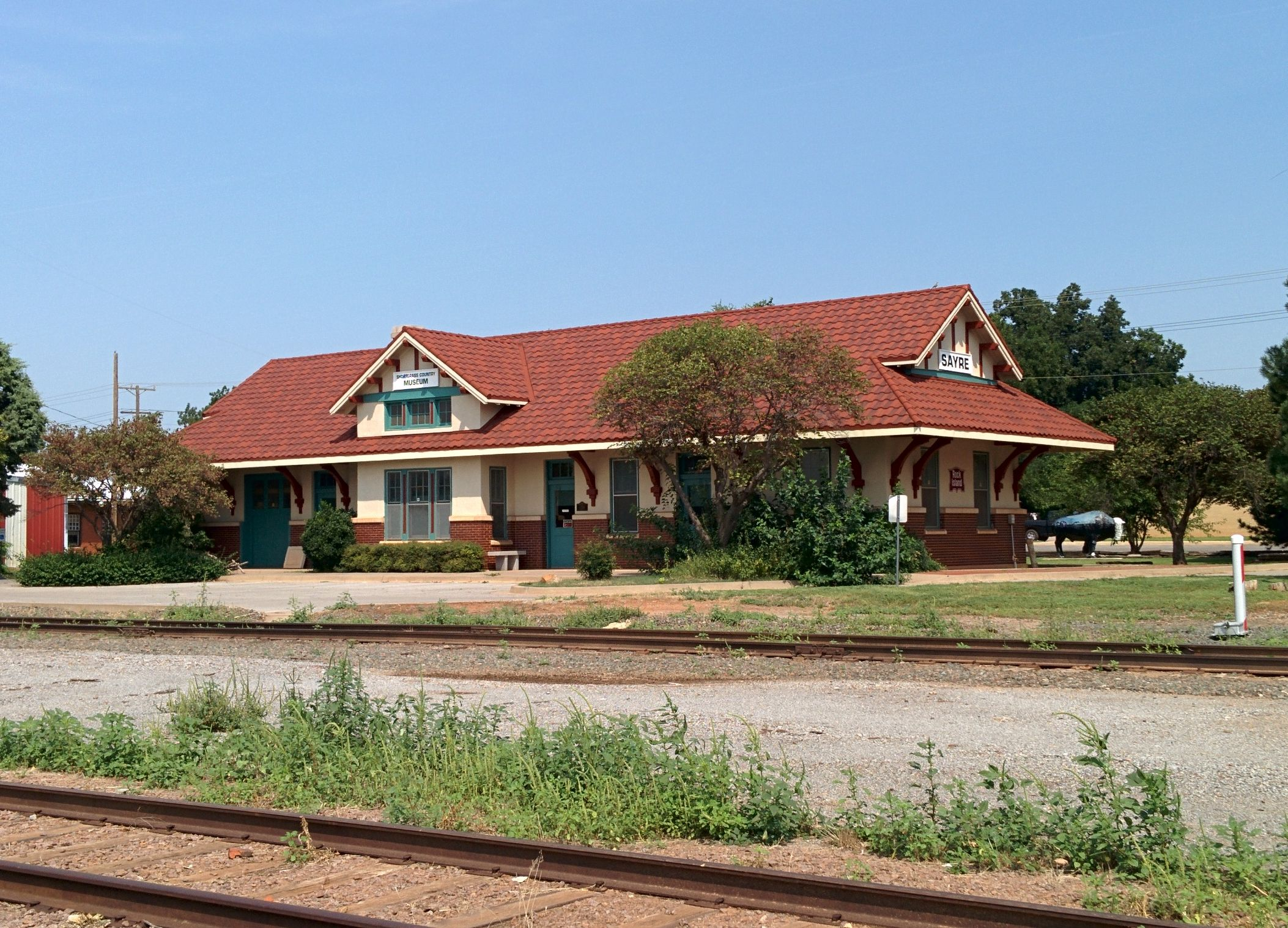
- Former Rock Island Depot, now Shortgrass Museum, August 29, 2015

General information
- Location: 106 East Poplar Avenue, Sayre, Oklahoma 73662
- System: Former Rock Island Line passenger rail station
- Owner: Shortgrass Country Museum
- Line: Chicago, Rock Island and Pacific Railroad
- Platforms: 2 (Formerly)
- Tracks: 2 (Formerly)

History
- Opened: 1901
- Closed: 1972
- Rebuilt: 1927

Former services
Preceding station	Chicago, Rock Island and Pacific Railroad	Following station
Hext toward Tucumcari	Tucumcari – Memphis	Elk City toward Memphis
- Sayre Rock Island Depot
- U.S. National Register of Historic Places
- Location within Oklahoma Location within the United States
- Location: 106 E. Poplar, Sayre, Oklahoma
- Coordinates: 35°17′35″N 99°38′19″W
- Area: less than one acre
- Built: 1927
- Built by: Leake Construction Company
- Architectural style: Italian Renaissance
- NRHP reference No.: 00000654
- Added to NRHP: June 9, 2000
Location

The Sayre Rock Island Depot is a historic railroad station located at 106 E. Poplar Ave. in Sayre, Oklahoma. The depot was built in 1927 along the Chicago, Rock Island and Pacific Railroad (a.k.a. Rock Island); it replaced Sayre's original Rock Island station, which opened outside the town limits in 1901. The new station is just two blocks north of downtown Sayre. It accommodated the increased traffic the line had gained in the early 1920s; it also helped the railroad compete with the recently designated U.S. Route 66. The station building was built from and has an Italian Renaissance Revival design. Its design resembles two other surviving Rock Island stations in Oklahoma: the Hobart Depot and the Walters Depot.

From the 1930s onward, railroad traffic on the Rock Island declined as travelers and freight moved on highways rather than trains. The railroad gave the station to the City of Sayre in 1972 after ending its passenger service. In the late 1980s, the Shortgrass Country Museum occupied the building. The depot was added to the National Register of Historic Places on June 9, 2000.

The rail line through Sayre is operated by Farmrail Corporation since 1981.

== Building description ==
The depot was erected on the north side of the railroad tracks. Grain storage facilities of various ages and size are on the south side of the tracks, extending both east and west of the station. The depot building is of one-story, brick and stucco Italian Renaissance Revival architecture style. It has red brick along the lower portion of the walls and stucco along the upper walls, with red, ceramic tile, gable-on-hipped roof and a concrete foundation. A stone stringcourse separates the brick from stucco on the walls. The windows are primarily six-over-one, hung with several four-over-one windows, with flat heads and stone sills. All of the exterior doors appear to be original. The three exterior pedestrian doors are glass and wood panel with three light transoms. There are two large, freight doors on either side of the baggage area, on the west end of the depot. The freight door on the north side is shorter than that on the south, to allow for the above grade dock. Decorative details include wide open eaves, oversize brackets with stone drops, triple windows, and a red brick chimney with a stone cap.

== Later modifications ==
The exterior of the building remains intact. Modifications that have been made since the Shortridge Museum moved in do not impact the integrity of the building:

- Two cooling units have been situated next to the dock on the south side; the hole on the south elevation for the former air conditioning unit has been covered with a metal panel;
- A new brick walkway has been constructed around the east, north and west sides with a new concrete sidewalk on the south side;
- The drive and parking lot around the building have been paved. The new brick walk, concrete sidewalk and paved drive and parking lot were all initiated and completed in 1999.

The interior of the building has been more extensively changed. Although the room configuration remains as constructed, the interior does not retain many historic features.

- The trim and floors have been painted grey;
- The ticket window between the former Black waiting room and ticket office has been blocked off;
- The former Black restrooms have been combined to create a kitchenette;
- A new door has been created between the ticket office and the former white men's restroom;
- A doorway has been opened between the ticket office and the former white waiting room;
- The south portion of the Ladies Rest (waiting) Room has been blocked off.

Despite these alterations, the building maintains a high degree of integrity of location, setting, design, workmanship, materials, feeling and association.

== NRHP listing ==
The depot was ruled eligible for listing on the NRHP under Criteria A and C, with a period of significance from 1927 to 1950.
