= Carter, Oklahoma =

Town in Oklahoma, US

- Town
- Location in Beckham County and the state of Oklahoma

- Location in Oklahoma Location in the United States
- Coordinates: 35°13′05″N 99°30′13″W
- Country: United States
- State: Oklahoma
- County: Beckham

Area
  - Total: 0.53 sq mi (1.38 km^{2})
  - Land: 0.53 sq mi (1.38 km^{2})
  - Water: 0 sq mi (0.00 km^{2})
- Elevation: 1,828 ft (557 m)

Population (2020)
  - Total: 183
  - Density: 344.1/sq mi (132.86/km^{2})
- Time zone: UTC-6 (Central (CST))
  - Summer (DST): UTC-5 (CDT)
- ZIP code: 73627
- Area code: 580
- FIPS code: 40-12300
- GNIS feature ID: 2413175

Carter is a town in Beckham County, Oklahoma, United States. The population was 183 at the time of the 2020 census.

== Geography ==
According to the United States Census Bureau, the town has a total area of 0.5 square miles (1.3 km^{2}), all land.

Carter is located at the intersection of State Highways 34 and 55. This intersection is the western terminus of SH-55.

=== Climate ===
Climate data for Carter, Oklahoma
Month	Jan	Feb	Mar	Apr	May	Jun	Jul	Aug	Sep	Oct	Nov	Dec	Year
Mean daily maximum °F (°C)	49.6 (9.8)	54.9 (12.7)	64.9 (18.3)	74.8 (23.8)	82.7 (28.2)	90.6 (32.6)	96.9 (36.1)	95.3 (35.2)	86.5 (30.3)	75.8 (24.3)	61.8 (16.6)	51.4 (10.8)	73.8 (23.2)
Mean daily minimum °F (°C)	22.7 (−5.2)	27.5 (−2.5)	35.9 (2.2)	46.0 (7.8)	55.1 (12.8)	64.1 (17.8)	68.6 (20.3)	66.9 (19.4)	59.4 (15.2)	47.6 (8.7)	35.5 (1.9)	25.9 (−3.4)	46.3 (7.9)
Average precipitation inches (mm)	0.5 (13)	0.8 (20)	1.5 (38)	1.9 (48)	4.3 (110)	3.7 (94)	1.7 (43)	2.4 (61)	3.0 (76)	2.2 (56)	1.4 (36)	0.6 (15)	24 (610)
Source 1: weather.com
Source 2: Weatherbase.com

== Demographics ==
Historical population
Census	Pop.	Note	%±
1910	265		—
1920	389		46.8%
1930	642		65.0%
1940	535		−16.7%
1950	406		−24.1%
1960	364		−10.3%
1970	311		−14.6%
1980	367		18.0%
1990	286		−22.1%
2000	254		−11.2%
2010	256		0.8%
2020	183		−28.5%
U.S. Decennial Census

=== 2020 census ===
As of the 2020 census, Carter had a population of 183. The median age was 46.3 years. 18.6% of residents were under the age of 18 and 15.3% of residents were 65 years of age or older. For every 100 females there were 125.9 males, and for every 100 females age 18 and over there were 119.1 males age 18 and over.

0.0% of residents lived in urban areas, while 100.0% lived in rural areas.

There were 90 households in Carter, of which 36.7% had children under the age of 18 living in them. Of all households, 41.1% were married-couple households, 25.6% were households with a male householder and no spouse or partner present, and 24.4% were households with a female householder and no spouse or partner present. About 26.7% of all households were made up of individuals and 11.1% had someone living alone who was 65 years of age or older.

There were 112 housing units, of which 19.6% were vacant. The homeowner vacancy rate was 1.2% and the rental vacancy rate was 0.0%.

Racial composition as of the 2020 census
Race	Number	Percent
White	165	90.2%
Black or African American	2	1.1%
American Indian and Alaska Native	0	0.0%
Asian	2	1.1%
Native Hawaiian and Other Pacific Islander	0	0.0%
Some other race	3	1.6%
Two or more races	11	6.0%
Hispanic or Latino (of any race)	21	11.5%

=== 2000 census ===
As of the census of 2000, there were 254 people, 114 households, and 68 families residing in the town. The population density was 546.9 inhabitants per square mile (211.2/km^{2}). There were 136 housing units at an average density of 292.8 per square mile (113.1/km^{2}). The racial makeup of the town was 85.83% White, 3.15% Native American, 8.27% from other races, and 2.76% from two or more races. Hispanic or Latino of any race were 11.42% of the population.

There were 114 households, out of which 26.3% had children under the age of 18 living with them, 47.4% were married couples living together, 9.6% had a female householder with no husband present, and 39.5% were non-families. 34.2% of all households were made up of individuals, and 15.8% had someone living alone who was 65 years of age or older. The average household size was 2.23 and the average family size was 2.90.

In the town, the population was spread out, with 21.3% under the age of 18, 11.4% from 18 to 24, 30.7% from 25 to 44, 22.8% from 45 to 64, and 13.8% who were 65 years of age or older. The median age was 37 years. For every 100 females, there were 96.9 males. For every 100 females age 18 and over, there were 102.0 males.

The median income for a household in the town was $21,250, and the median income for a family was $26,250. Males had a median income of $20,125 versus $16,500 for females. The per capita income for the town was $17,216. About 24.2% of families and 28.9% of the population were below the poverty line, including 52.1% of those under the age of eighteen and 28.1% of those 65 or over.

== Education ==
Carter School was founded in 1929 but was abandoned after a vote to close the Beckham County School District in 2002. The building burned down in 2021.

Carter is divided between the Merritt Public Schools school district and the Sentinel Public Schools school district.
