= Casa Grande Hotel (Elk City, Oklahoma) =

- U.S. National Register of Historic Places
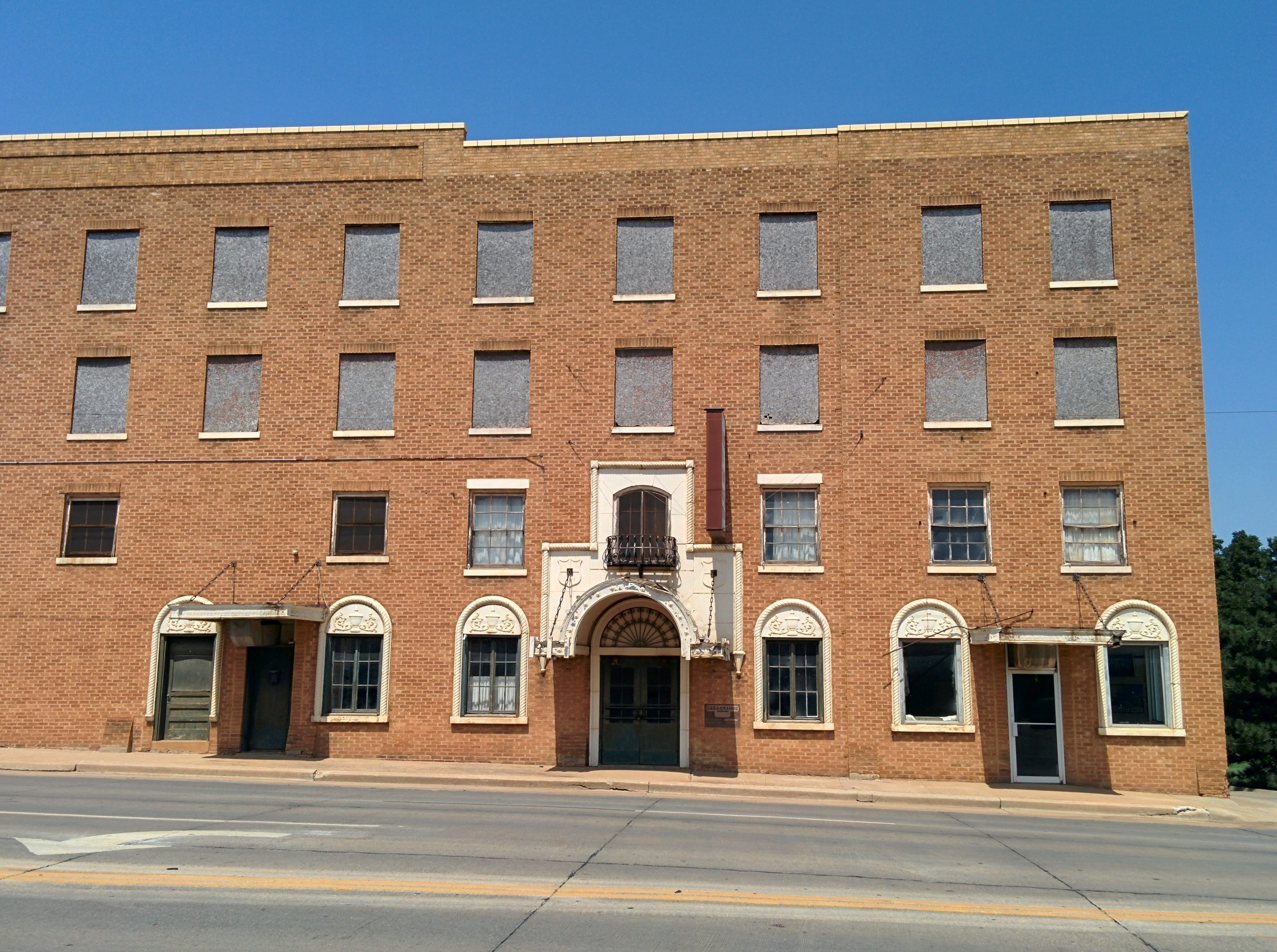

- Location within Oklahoma Location within the United States
- Location: 103 E. Third St., Elk City, Oklahoma
- Coordinates: 35°24′43″N 99°24′15″W
- Area: 1 acre (0.40 ha)
- Built: 1928
- Built by: Krumrei, W.C.
- Architect: Hawk and Parr
- Architectural style: Spanish eclectic
- MPS: Route 66 in Oklahoma MPS
- NRHP reference No.: 95000043
- Added to NRHP: February 23, 1995

The Casa Grande Hotel is a historic hotel located at the intersection of 3rd Street and historic U.S. Route 66 in downtown Elk City, Oklahoma. The hotel opened in 1928, shortly after Route 66 was designated, to lodge the growing number of travelers on the highway. Architects Hawk and Parr designed the four-story building in the Spanish Eclectic style; their design features arched windows and doors and stone ornamentation along the arches. Spanish-influenced styles such as the Spanish Eclectic were common on the southwestern portion of Route 66 due to the region's Spanish history. The luxury hotel faded in popularity after the 1920s, and as a result, the Casa Grande is the only high-rise hotel on Route 66 between Oklahoma City and Amarillo, Texas.

The hotel was added to the National Register of Historic Places on February 23, 1995.
