= National Register of Historic Places listings in Kiowa County, Oklahoma =

Location of Kiowa County in Oklahoma

This is a list of the National Register of Historic Places listings in Kiowa County, Oklahoma.

This is intended to be a complete list of the properties and districts on the National Register of Historic Places in Kiowa County, Oklahoma, United States. The locations of National Register properties and districts for which the latitude and longitude coordinates are included below, may be seen in a map.

There are 8 properties and districts listed on the National Register in the county.

This National Park Service list is complete through NPS recent listings posted September 26, 2025.

== Current listings ==
| | Name on the Register | Image | Date listed | Location | City or town | Description |
|---|---|---|---|---|---|---|
| 1 | Camp Radziminski | | April 13, 1972 (#72001067) | Address Restricted | Mountain Park | |
| 2 | Devil's Canyon | | June 20, 1972 (#72001066) | Along the North Fork of the Red River at the center of a triangle with points at Blair, Lugert, and Warren; 34°50′10″N 99°15′20″W | Lugert | |
| 3 | Downtown Hobart Historic District | Downtown Hobart Historic District | March 10, 2005 (#05000130) | Roughly bounded by Jefferson St., 3rd, Washington, 4th, and the 200 and 500 blocks of S. Main St. 35°01′28″N 99°05′34″W | Hobart | |
| 4 | Hobart City Hall | Hobart City Hall | May 22, 1978 (#78002240) | Main and 3rd Sts. 35°01′33″N 99°05′33″W | Hobart | |
| 5 | Hobart Public Library | Hobart Public Library | October 31, 1980 (#80003267) | 200 S. Main St. 35°01′34″N 99°05′33″W | Hobart | |
| 6 | Hobart Rock Island Depot | Hobart Rock Island Depot | December 7, 1995 (#95001418) | 518 S. Main; 35°01′21″N 99°05′31″W | Hobart | |
| 7 | Joyce House | | March 19, 2012 (#11000338) | County Road 1620 EW, 2.5 miles (4.0 km) west of US 183; 34°40′09″N 98°59′53″W | Snyder vicinity | |
| 8 | Kiowa County Courthouse | Kiowa County Courthouse | August 23, 1984 (#84003094) | Courthouse Square; 35°01′30″N 99°05′31″W | Hobart | |

== See also ==
- List of National Historic Landmarks in Oklahoma
- National Register of Historic Places listings in Oklahoma
