= Babbs Switch fire =

Incident in Babbs Switch, Oklahoma

Coordinates: 34.9580°N 99.0608°W

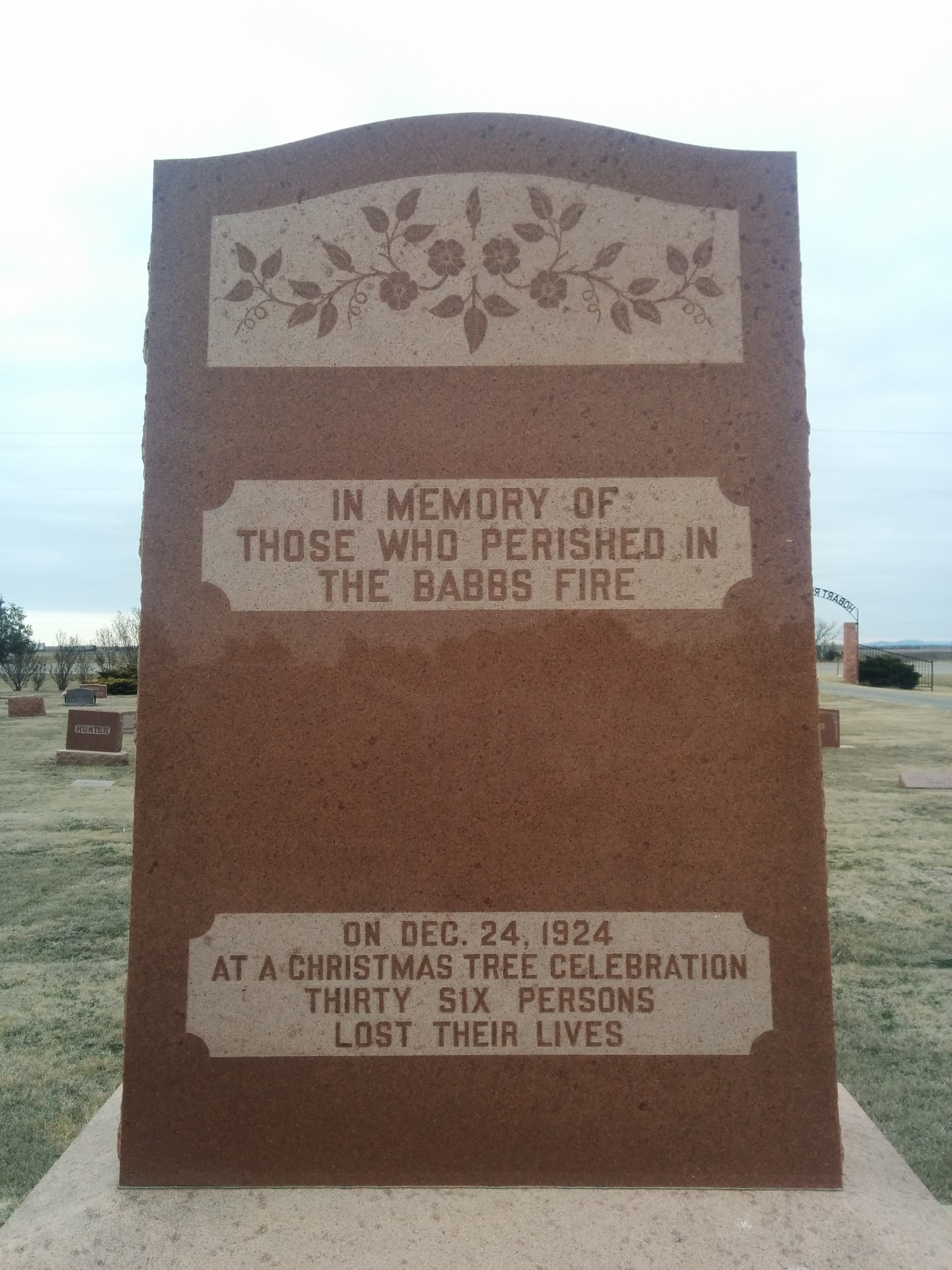
- Gravestone for the victims at the Rose Cemetery in Hobart, Oklahoma.
- Date: December 24, 1924
- Location: Babbs Switch, Oklahoma
- Deaths: 36
- Injuries: 37+
- Missing: 1

The Babbs Switch fire on December 24, 1924, killed thirty-six people in a one-room school house at Babbs Switch, Oklahoma. Whole families died, and more than half the dead were children. According to the National Fire Protection Association, it is the sixth-deadliest school fire on record in the United States.

== Fire ==
The fire started during a Christmas Eve party attended by over 200 people. A Christmas tree decorated with lighted candles stood at the front of the room, and presents were placed on the tree to be distributed to the children in attendance at the end of the program. The fire began when a teenage student dressed as Santa Claus was removing presents from the tree to give to the children. The flames ignited paper decorations, tinsel, and dry needles and spread quickly to the tree, stage, and the greater structure of the building. People rushed to the building's single door, which opened inward and was soon jammed with people. Escape through the windows was blocked because they were covered with secure metal screens to prevent vandals from breaking into the school. One boy was able to escape through a window because someone succeeded in prying open a corner of one of the screens.

The dead and injured were transported by car to Hobart, the nearest sizable town, and a makeshift morgue was set up in a downtown building. The next day, 32 people were reported dead, and 37 injured were reported in Hobart hospitals. Four died of their injuries, bringing the number of dead to 36. One child, three-year-old Mary Edens, was reported as missing, but her body was not found. Her aunt Alice Noah, who escaped from the building but died several days later, said that she recalled carrying Mary out of the building and handing her to someone she did not know.

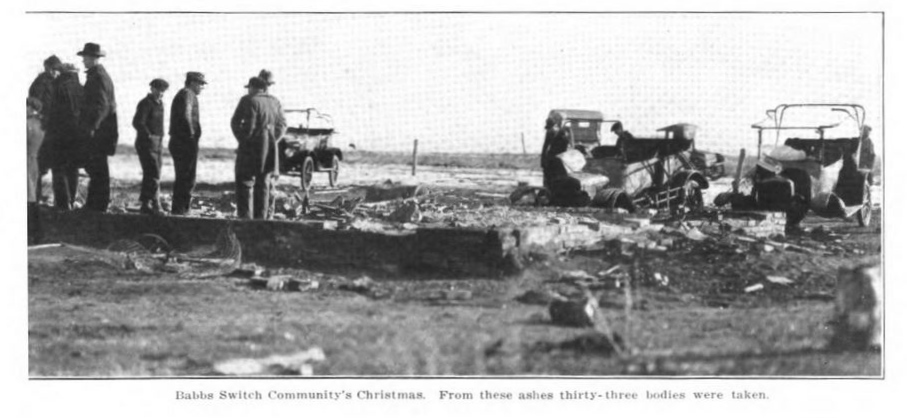
Men inspect the site of the burned Babbs Switch school.

== Investigation ==
The fire was quickly investigated by the National Fire Protection Association (NFPA) and the Oklahoma Inspection Bureau, both of which published their analyses of the fire in January 1925. The reports identified multiple factors that compounded the severity of the fire. The NFPA stated, "It is hardly conceivable that conditions could have been worse, even in so rudimentary a structure as this one-story building." Both reports found that the building was overcrowded, with the number of people in attendance clearly exceeding the room's capacity. The reports differed in their statements on the attendance and size of the room; the NFPA said there were 200 to 250 people in attendance in a 25 by 36 foot room, while the Oklahoma Inspection Bureau said that there were 150 people in a 20 by 36 foot room. The schoolhouse was a light wood-frame building, which offered no fire resistance. Gas lamps were used to light the building, which quickly exploded due to the heat from the fire. The ceiling had been freshly painted with white oil paint, which made the fire flashover once it reached the ceiling. Lighted candles on a Christmas tree were a well-known fire hazard, and the Oklahoma Inspection Bureau noted that having the teenage Santa Claus remove presents from the branches of the lighted tree was very risky. The one usable door to the building opened inward, which is hazardous in emergency situations because a crowd pressing against the door will make it impossible to open. The NFPA report said there was only one door, while the Oklahoma Inspection Bureau report noted that there was a second door, but that door opened into a coal bin that had been added after the school was built and thus was not a usable exit. The windows were covered with secure metal screens to prevent vandals from breaking into the school. There was no firefighting equipment in the building, and there was no running water anywhere near the school. Fire marshal James A. Adkinson helped investigate many schools in the area to make sure all schools were as safe as possible.

== Aftermath ==
The survivors and families of the victims received charitable donations locally and from around the country. Hobart Mayor F.E. Gillespie appointed a committee to ensure proper care for the children who were orphaned by the fire. The day after the fire, 25 children from Muskogee, Oklahoma sent a box of their new Christmas toys to the children who survived the fire. A finance committee in Hobart in charge of managing cash donations distributed a total of $12,803.

In the years prior to the fire, the Oklahoma State Fire Marshal had attempted, due to their known safety risks, to identify all the one-room, one-door schoolhouses in Oklahoma, but county superintendents had not been forthcoming with that information. The fire galvanized school officials and concerned citizens, who voluntarily requested safety inspections for their schools. By February 1925, the fire marshal's office had received over 400 requests for inspections, and over 150 schools had already been inspected and had made the safety improvements recommended by the fire marshal.

In response to the fire, the state of Oklahoma passed the Fawks Bill, which increased fire safety requirements for schools. This law required all schools to have a minimum of two doors, and all school doors were required to open outward. Any window screens had to be removable from the inside, and schools had to keep fire extinguishers on the premises. Copies of the law were sent to every school official in the state so no one could claim ignorance of the new standards. In July 1926, John Carrol, assistant fire marshal, stated that since the time of the fire, school officials had willingly implemented the safety improvements recommended to them by Office of the State Fire Marshal. He stated, "Schoolhouses of Oklahoma are virtually all in excellent shape now."

A new school was built on the site in 1925 but closed in 1943 when the Babbs Switch district was annexed into the nearby Hobart and Roosevelt districts. A stone monument, which bears a short description of the fire and a list of the dead, currently stands on the site of the former school.

The nationwide publicity over the fire led to stricter fire safety codes for schools and other public buildings.

=== Edens hoax ===
The fire gave rise to a hoax. Because three-year-old Mary Edens's body was not recovered, her parents hoped that she had somehow survived the fire. In 1957, Grace Reynolds of Barstow, California came forward, claiming to be the long-lost child. Reynolds and the Edens family were reunited on the air during an episode of the Art Linkletter's House Party television program. Reynolds later wrote a book about her experiences entitled Mary, Child of Tragedy: The Story of the Lost Child of the 1924 Babbs Switch Fire. A local newspaper editor knew the story to be fraudulent, but withheld the information until 1999 at the request of Mary Edens's father, who believed his wife could not endure losing her child a second time.

== Fiction ==
- Beard, Darleen Bailey. The Babbs Switch Story. Farrar, Straus and Giroux, 2002. ISBN 0-374-30475-0
- Grossnickle, Mary Edens. Mary, Child of Tragedy: The Story of the Lost Child of the 1924 Babbs Switch Fire. Schoonmaker Publishers, 1980 (first published as a true story but later discredited).
