= Swanson County, Oklahoma =

Former county in Oklahoma, United States

Coordinates: 34.7°N 98.9°W

Swanson County
- County of Oklahoma
- 1910–1911
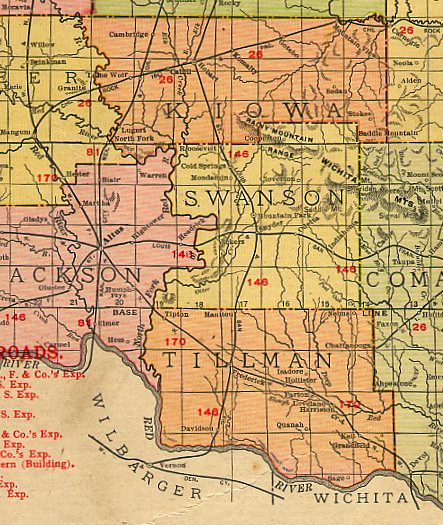
- Swanson County on the map from circa 1912.
- Capital: Mountain Park (1910-1911)
- History
  - Established: 13 August 1910
  - Disestablished: 27 June 1911
- Contained within
  - Country: United States
  - State: Oklahoma
Preceded by	Succeeded by
Kiowa County; Comanche County	Kiowa County; Comanche County
- Today part of: United States

Swanson County is a defunct county in Oklahoma. It was created from southern Kiowa County and western Comanche County on August 13, 1910, after a special election, but dissolved after a decision by the Oklahoma Supreme Court overturned the election in 1911. The county was named for Claude A. Swanson, Governor of Virginia and a friend of Oklahoma Governor Charles N. Haskell.

== History ==
On May 10, 1910, a special election was held in southern Kiowa County and western Comanche County to approve the formation of a new county that could more effectively serve residents of that area. Although more than 60 percent of the overall residents approved the measure, a majority of Comanche County Residents voted against it. Governor Charles N. Haskell officially proclaimed Swanson County's formation on August 13, 1910 and designated Mountain Park, Oklahoma as the temporary county seat. In January 1911, the state House of Representatives seated James V. McClintic as the representative from Swanson County.

The location of the county seat in Mountain Park was hotly contested by a group of residents who favored Snyder as the seat. They claimed that Mountain Park lacked a public water system, fire protection and suitable office space for county government. A rainstorm that soaked official county documents seemed to prove their point. Legal action was brought to resolve the dispute. On September 5, 1910, a group from Snyder simply removed the records to their town. A group of Mountain Park supporters retaliated by invading the homes of county officials and arresting these men at gunpoint. During this action, an employee of one of the county commissioners was killed. On March 7, 1911, the Supreme Court restored Mountain Park as the county seat and ordered that the county records be moved to Hobart, the seat of Kiowa County.

Meanwhile, officials of Comanche County challenged the Governor's proclamation in the District Court, arguing that the new county had not been approved by residents in their county. That court ruled in for dissolution, but the case was appealed to the state Supreme Court (Armstrong v. State ex rel. Fain co. Atty). On June 27, 1911, the Oklahoma Supreme Court dissolved the county.

Following the extinction of Swanson County, Cotton County was created from southern Comanche County in 1912.

== See also ==
- Beckham County, Kentucky, another county disestablished by judicial order soon after its creation
