= Gary Hill (basketball) =

American basketball player

Personal information
- Born: October 7, 1941
- Died: January 17, 2009 (aged 67)
- Listed height: 6 ft 4 in (1.93 m)
- Listed weight: 185 lb (84 kg)

Career information
- High school: Rocky (Rocky, Oklahoma)
- College: Oklahoma City (1960–1963)
- NBA draft: 1963: 2nd round, 11th overall pick
- Drafted by: San Francisco Warriors
- Playing career: 1963–1964
- Position: Guard
- Number: 12, 20

Career history
- 1963–1964: San Francisco Warriors
- 1964: Baltimore Bullets

Career NBA statistics
- Points: 370 (4.7 ppg)
- Rebounds: 130 (1.7 rpg)
- Assists: 110 (1.6 apg)
- Stats at NBA.com
- Stats at Basketball Reference

Gary Weir Hill (October 7, 1941 – January 17, 2009) was an American professional basketball player. Before playing professional basketball in the NBA, Hill came from Rocky, Oklahoma, where Bud, Henry and Ron Koper, Jay and Dennis Harris and Steve Fite came from before starring at Oklahoma City University. They became known as the Rocky Rockets. Hill scored 2,739 points and averaged 24.5 points, setting state records and becoming an all-American during his high-school career.

== College career ==
Hill played for Oklahoma City University from 1959 to 1963 with Coach Abe Lemons (Lemons was later the head coach at the University of Texas), and Assistant Coach Paul Hansen (Hansen was later the head coach of Oklahoma State University).

As a junior, Hill scored 17.4 points a game, becoming one of four on that team who averaged double figures in points. Senior Larry Jones was OCU's leading scorer at 19.7 points a game, sophomore Bud Koper added 15.9 points a game and senior Eugene Tsoodle averaged 14 points a game in 1961–62. That was the first time in program history an OCU team featured four double-digit scorers for the season. The 1961–62 Chiefs averaged 82.1 points a game, the most in a season by any college basketball team in Oklahoma to that point.

Hill scored 21.1 points a game as a senior in 1962–63. OCU's team was billed as the tallest ever in college basketball to that point with an average height of 6-foot-7 and one fifth.

In 1962–63, OCU went 19–10 and advanced to the NCAA Tournament for the first time in six years, finishing fourth in the NCAA Midwest Regional in Lawrence, Kansas. The Chiefs had a 13-game win streak. Hill scored nine of his team's final 11 points against in a 70–67 win over Colorado State in the NCAA Tournament at Lubbock, Texas.

Hill, 6-foot-4, 185 lb guard, was known as an outstanding ball handler, great defensive player and a high-percentage shooter. He was named All-American by the Helms Foundation.{Source Oklahoma City University Athletic Department}

Hill played in the East-West NCAA all-American game in Lexington, Kentucky, and scored a game-high 18 points. He was also an alternate on the Pan American team.

Along with his coach Abe Lemons, Hill was part of the inaugural class of the OCU athletic hall of fame in 1979. Other members of that class were Bud Koper, Farrell Craig, Paul Hansen, Hub Reed and Arnold Short. Hill played for OCU from 1959 to 1963.

== Professional career ==
The San Francisco Warriors selected Hill as the 3rd pick in the second round of the 1963 NBA draft, 11th overall, and the 2nd pick by the Warriors behind Basketball Hall of Famer Nate Thurmond.

Hill was on the 1963–64 San Francisco Warriors team who finished first in the NBA Western Division and featured Wilt Chamberlain, Al Attles, and Nate Thurmond. Hill spent two years playing in the NBA for the Warriors and the Baltimore Bullets.

== Career statistics ==
Legend
GP	Games played	GS	Games started	MPG	Minutes per game
FG%	Field goal percentage	3P%	3-point field goal percentage	FT%	Free throw percentage
RPG	Rebounds per game	APG	Assists per game	SPG	Steals per game
BPG	Blocks per game	PPG	Points per game	**Bold**	Career high

=== NBA ===
==== Regular season ====
Year	Team	GP	MPG	FG%	FT%	RPG	APG	PPG
1963–64	San Francisco	**67**	**15.1**	**.380**	**.662**	**1.7**	**1.5**	**5.1**
1964–65	San Francisco	9	9.8	.286	.500	**1.7**	.7	3.0
1964–65	Baltimore	3	5.0	.000	–	.3	.3	.0
Career		79	14.2	.371	.637	1.6	1.4	4.7

==== Playoffs ====
Year	Team	GP	MPG	FG%	FT%	RPG	APG	PPG
1964	San Francisco	9	7.7	.500	.308	.7	.9	3.1
