= KWHW =

KWHW could refer to:

- KWHW (AM), a radio station (1450 AM) licensed to serve Altus, Oklahoma, United States
- KPRO (FM), a radio station (93.5 FM) licensed to serve Altus, Oklahoma, which held the call sign KWHW-FM from 1974 to 1984 and from 2011 to 2021
