= Great Plains State Park =

State park in Oklahoma, United States

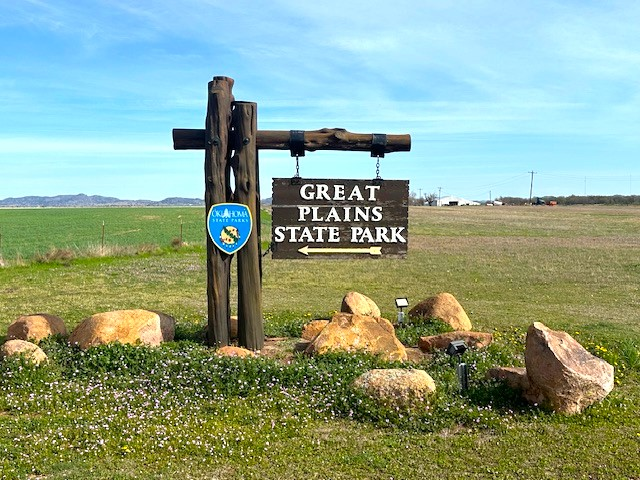
- Entry sign at Great Plains State Park, 3-2025

- Location within Oklahoma
- Location: Kiowa County, Oklahoma, United States
- Nearest city: Mountain Park, OK
- Coordinates: 34.7770095°N 98.9842429°W
- Area: 487 acres (197 ha)
- Visitors: 69,815 (in 2021)
- Governing body: Oklahoma Tourism and Recreation Department
- Website: www.travelok.com/listings/view.profile/id.3201

Great Plains State Park is a 487-acre (1.97 km^{2}) Oklahoma state park located in Kiowa County, Oklahoma. The part of the park that is developed for campers and hikers is about 487 acres. However, the entire park encompasses more than 1,200 acres from one end to the other. It is located near the city of Mountain Park, Oklahoma. Located south of Hobart off Hwy 183, Great Plains State Park is nestled between the Wichita Mountains and the Tom Steed Reservoir. (Note: The park is on the east shore of the 6,400 acres (26 km^{2}) Tom Steed Reservoir.) The area offers water sports, boating, boat ramps, camping, RV parking, swimming beach, playground, picnic areas, cycling, mountain biking and hiking trails. The campground spans approximately 460 acres (1.9 km^{2}) of park land with 56 RV hookups and 30 tent sites. RV sites consist of 14 modern water, sewer, and electric sites and 42 semi-modern sites with water and electric. Located on the shores of Tom Steed Reservoir, a large lake with 31 miles (50 km) of shoreline.

== Fees ==
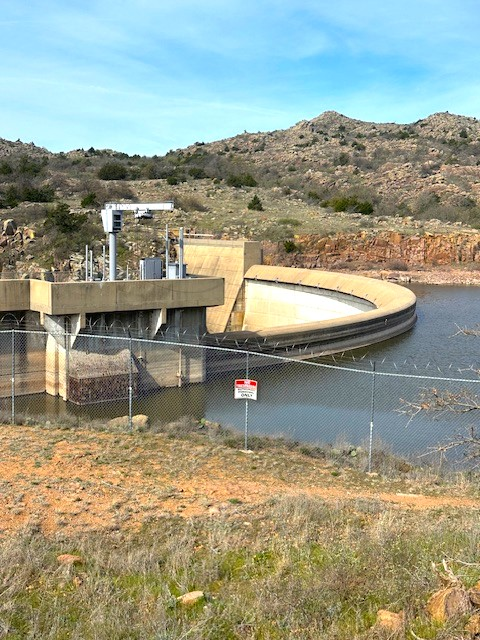
Mountain Park Dam on Tom Steed Reservoir at Great Plains State Park in March 2025

To help fund a backlog of deferred maintenance and park improvements, the state implemented an entrance fee for this park and 21 others effective June 15, 2020. The fees, charged per vehicle, start at $10 per day for a single-day or $8 for residents with an Oklahoma license plate or Oklahoma tribal plate. Fees are waived for honorably discharged veterans and Oklahoma residents age 62 & older and their spouses. Passes good for three days or a week are also available; annual passes good at all 22 state parks charging fees are offered at a cost of $75 for out-of-state visitors or $60 for Oklahoma residents. The 22 parks are:

- Arrowhead Area at Lake Eufaula State Park
- Beavers Bend State Park
- Boiling Springs State Park
- Cherokee Landing State Park
- Fort Cobb State Park
- Foss State Park
- Honey Creek Area at Grand Lake State Park
- Great Plains State Park
- Great Salt Plains State Park
- Greenleaf State Park
- Keystone State Park
- Lake Eufaula State Park
- Lake Murray State Park
- Lake Texoma State Park
- Lake Thunderbird State Park
- Lake Wister State Park
- Natural Falls State Park
- Osage Hills State Park
- Robbers Cave State Park
- Sequoyah State Park
- Tenkiller State Park
- Twin Bridges Area at Grand Lake State Park

== Gallery ==
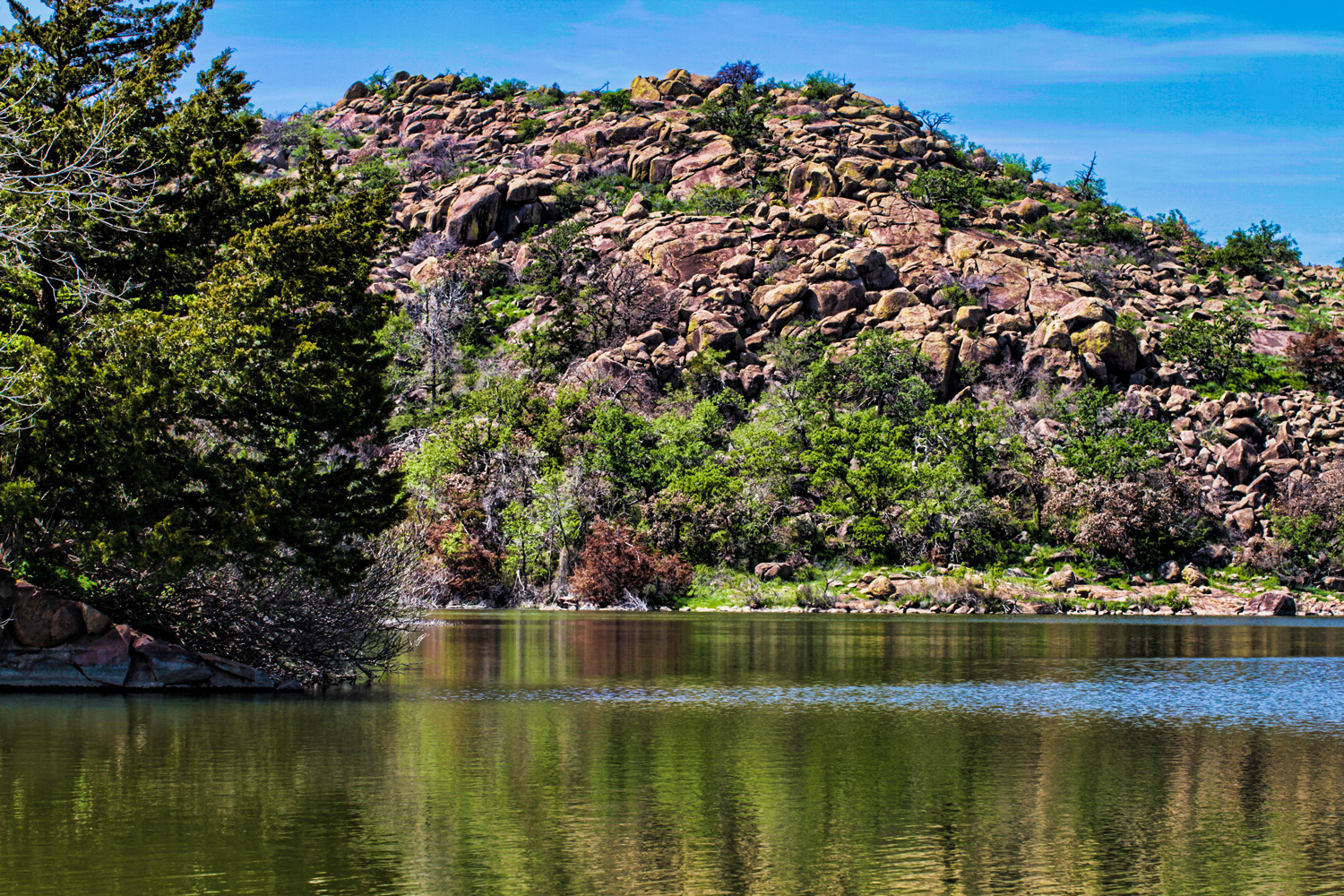
Great Plains State Park, March 2012

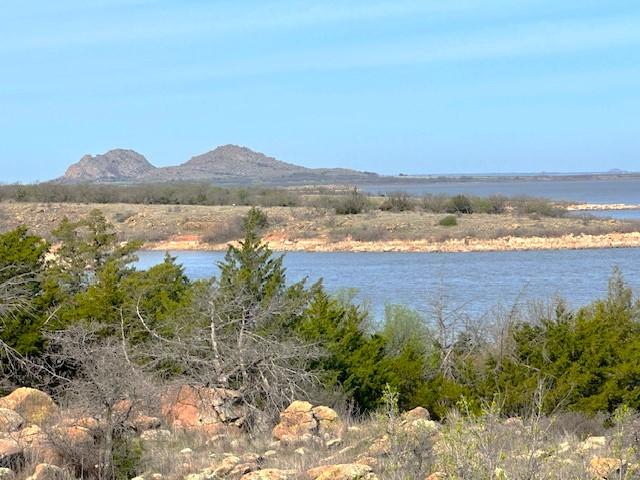
Twin Mountains as viewed from Park, 3-2025

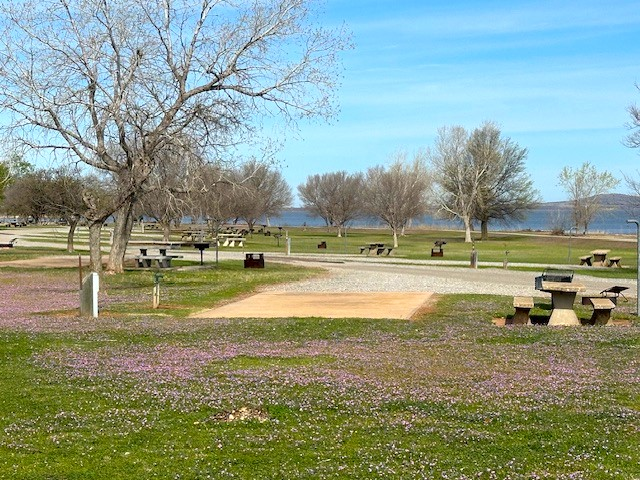
Park picnic facilities, 3-2025

== See also ==
- Tom Steed Reservoir
