= Roosevelt, Oklahoma =

- Town
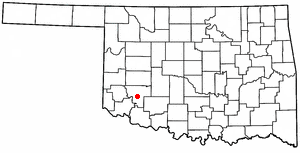
- Location of Roosevelt, Oklahoma
- Coordinates: 34°50′54″N 99°01′20″W
- Country: United States
- State: Oklahoma
- County: Kiowa

Area
  - Total: 0.49 sq mi (1.27 km^{2})
  - Land: 0.49 sq mi (1.27 km^{2})
  - Water: 0 sq mi (0.00 km^{2})
- Elevation: 1,460 ft (450 m)

Population (2020)
  - Total: 254
  - Density: 516.7/sq mi (199.48/km^{2})
- Time zone: UTC-6 (Central (CST))
  - Summer (DST): UTC-5 (CDT)
- ZIP code: 73564
- Area code: 580
- FIPS code: 40-63900
- GNIS feature ID: 2412575
- Website: www.rooseveltok.com

Roosevelt is a town in Kiowa County, Oklahoma, United States. As of the 2020 census, Roosevelt had a population of 254. The town was named for President Theodore Roosevelt.

== History ==
According to the Encyclopedia of Oklahoma History and Culture, the present town of Roosevelt was originally planned by Parkersburg Development Company before the opening of the Kiowa, Comanche, and Apache Reservation in 1901. At that time, the town was known as Parkersburg. However, another town by the same name already existed. Thus, the name was changed to Roosevelt by a townsite organizer, Charlie Parker, who had served under Theodore Roosevelt in the Spanish–American War. A post office named Roosevelt was established October 31, 1901. President Theodore Roosevelt actually visited the town in 1903.

By 1907, the town population had grown to 173. The population was 298 in 1910, 744 in 1940, and 679 in 1950. The population then declined to 280 in 2000.

== Geography ==
According to the United States Census Bureau, the town has a total area of 0.5 square miles (1.3 km^{2}), all land.

Roosevelt is at the intersection of US Route 183 and Oklahoma State Highway 19. Great Plains State Park and Tom Steed Reservoir are to the southeast.

== Demographics ==
Historical population
Census	Pop.	Note	%±
1910	298		—
1920	362		21.5%
1930	721		99.2%
1940	744		3.2%
1950	679		−8.7%
1960	495		−27.1%
1970	353		−28.7%
1980	396		12.2%
1990	323		−18.4%
2000	280		−13.3%
2010	248		−11.4%
2020	254		2.4%
U.S. Decennial Census

=== 2020 census ===
As of the 2020 census, Roosevelt had a population of 254. The median age was 43.7 years. 21.7% of residents were under the age of 18 and 22.0% of residents were 65 years of age or older. For every 100 females there were 103.2 males, and for every 100 females age 18 and over there were 99.0 males age 18 and over.

0.0% of residents lived in urban areas, while 100.0% lived in rural areas.

There were 113 households in Roosevelt, of which 41.6% had children under the age of 18 living in them. Of all households, 42.5% were married-couple households, 17.7% were households with a male householder and no spouse or partner present, and 31.9% were households with a female householder and no spouse or partner present. About 27.4% of all households were made up of individuals and 10.6% had someone living alone who was 65 years of age or older.

There were 141 housing units, of which 19.9% were vacant. The homeowner vacancy rate was 0.0% and the rental vacancy rate was 0.0%.

Racial composition as of the 2020 census
Race	Number	Percent
White	211	83.1%
Black or African American	2	0.8%
American Indian and Alaska Native	9	3.5%
Asian	0	0.0%
Native Hawaiian and Other Pacific Islander	0	0.0%
Some other race	12	4.7%
Two or more races	20	7.9%
Hispanic or Latino (of any race)	38	15.0%

=== 2000 census ===
As of the census of 2000, there were 280 people, 133 households, and 80 families residing in the town. The population density was 587.1 inhabitants per square mile (226.7/km^{2}). There were 179 housing units at an average density of 375.3 per square mile (144.9/km^{2}). The racial makeup of the town was 86.79% White, 2.50% African American, 1.07% Native American, 0.36% Pacific Islander, 3.57% from other races, and 5.71% from two or more races. Hispanic or Latino of any race were 11.43% of the population.

There were 133 households, out of which 21.8% had children under the age of 18 living with them, 48.1% were married couples living together, 6.8% had a female householder with no husband present, and 39.8% were non-families. 36.8% of all households were made up of individuals, and 24.8% had someone living alone who was 65 years of age or older. The average household size was 2.11 and the average family size was 2.73.

In the town, the population was spread out, with 19.6% under the age of 18, 6.8% from 18 to 24, 27.5% from 25 to 44, 20.4% from 45 to 64, and 25.7% who were 65 years of age or older. The median age was 43 years. For every 100 females, there were 105.9 males. For every 100 females age 18 and over, there were 92.3 males.

The median income for a household in the town was $22,500, and the median income for a family was $35,893. Males had a median income of $24,583 versus $20,000 for females. The per capita income for the town was $13,619. About 15.6% of families and 21.5% of the population were below the poverty line, including 10.5% of those under the age of eighteen and 25.9% of those 65 or over.

== Notable person ==
General Tommy Franks has lived on 240 acres southeast of Roosevelt since his retirement from the US Army in 2003.
