= Hobart Regional Airport =

Coordinates: 34°59′29″N 099°03′05″W

- IATA: HBR; ICAO: KHBR; FAA LID: HBR

Summary
- Airport type: Public
- Owner: City of Hobart
- Serves: Hobart, Oklahoma
- Elevation AMSL: 1,564 ft (477 m)
- Interactive map of Hobart Regional Airport

Runways
Direction	Length		Surface
Direction	ft	m	Surface
3/21	5,293	1,613	Asphalt
12/30	4,000	1,219	Asphalt
17/35	5,507	1,679	Asphalt
- Source: Federal Aviation Administration

Hobart Regional Airport (IATA: HBR, ICAO: KHBR, FAA LID: HBR) is three miles southeast of Hobart, in Kiowa County, Oklahoma, United States.

== Facilities ==
Hobart Regional Airport covers 1,119 acres (453 ha) and has three asphalt runways: 3/21 is 4,000 x 75, 12/30 is 5,293 ft × 150 ft (1,613 m × 46 m) and 17/35 is 5,507 ft × 100 ft (1,679 m × 30 m).

== See also ==
- List of airports in Oklahoma
