= Babbs, Oklahoma =

Babbs, Oklahoma Babbs Switch
- Unincorporated community
- Location within Oklahoma and the United States Babbs (the United States)
- Coordinates: 34°56′54″N 99°03′34″W
- Country: United States
- State: Oklahoma
- County: Kiowa
- Elevation: 1,536 ft (468 m)

Population (2000)
  - Total: 1
- Time zone: UTC-6 (Central (CST))
  - Summer (DST): UTC-5 (CDT)
- GNIS feature ID: 1100186

Babbs (formerly named Babbs Switch) is a community in Kiowa County, Oklahoma, United States. It was named for Edith "Babbs" Babcock. (Note: According to Shirk, the community was named for Babbs because she was the first person to deliver a load of wheat to the newly constructed grain elevator at the switch,) Babbs is 6 miles (9.7 km) south-southeast of Hobart, and is at an elevation of 1,535 feet (468 m).

Babbs was the scene of the Babbs Switch Fire on December 24, 1924, in which 36 people died in a school fire.
