= 1905 Snyder tornado =

1905 F5 tornado in Oklahoma

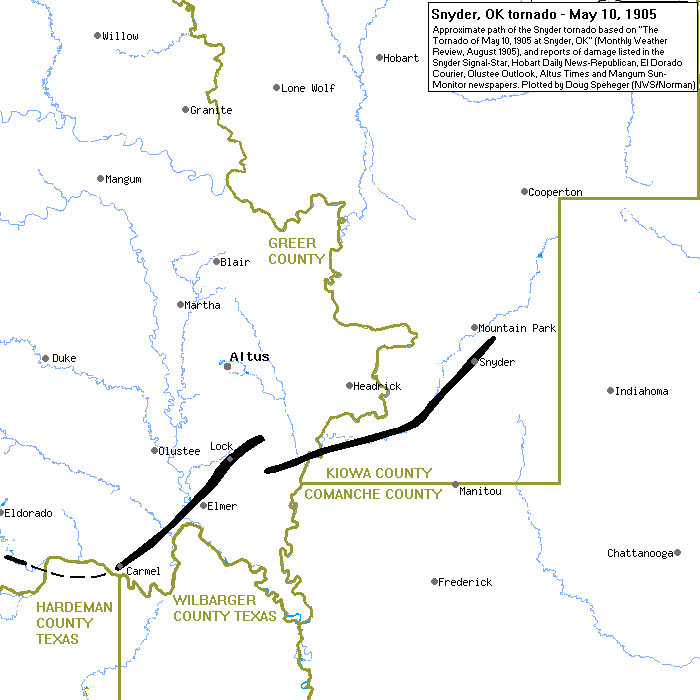
- Track of the tornadoes

Meteorological history
- Formed: May 10, 1905 , 6:30 p.m. CDT (UTC−05:00)
- Dissipated: May 10, 1905 , 9:00 p.m. CDT (UTC−05:00)
- Duration: 2 hours, 30 minutes

F5 tornado
- on the Fujita scale

Overall effects
- Casualties: >112 fatalities, ≥150 injuries
- Damage: Unknown

The 1905 Snyder tornado was a powerful tornado that struck the town of Snyder, Oklahoma, in Kiowa County on Wednesday, May 10, 1905. The event was one of the worst natural disasters ever to hit the state of Oklahoma. The tornado killed 97 people, making it the second most deadly tornado in Oklahoma history. The tornado was part of a larger, multiple-day tornado outbreak that hit several states across the Midwestern United States, including Kansas, Oklahoma, and Missouri.

== Meteorological synopsis ==
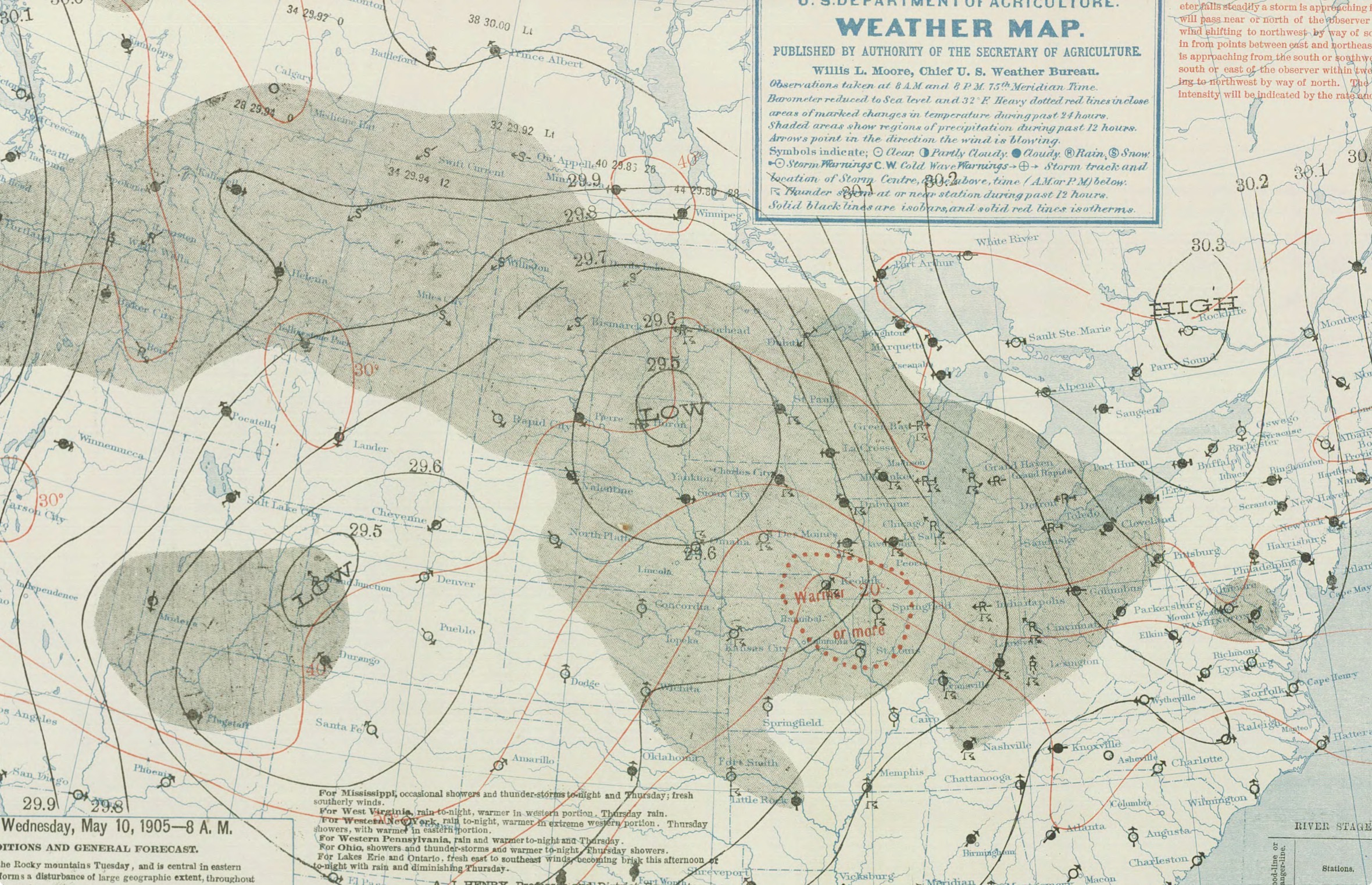
Weather analysis on May 10, 1905, showing the low pressure system that would produce the tornadoes

The tornado was caused by a strong low pressure system that developed across the Rocky Mountains, near Denver, Colorado. Another storm was also located across Wyoming on May 9. Tornadoes formed on that day across several Plains states including Missouri, Oklahoma, and Kansas. The Colorado storm system then moved toward the Central and Southern Plains on the next day and affected areas slightly to the east of the area affected on May 9. A new trough of low pressure developed in the vicinity of the southern storm. It later moved across the Oklahoma and Texas Panhandles.

As happened on numerous other occasions, such storms produced a large moist and warm flow from the Gulf of Mexico as well as much instability in the atmosphere. Being in May, storm systems produced large contrasts of temperatures, which added more ingredients for the development of powerful thunderstorms with possible damaging tornadoes. Such was the case on May 10, 1905.

== Snyder tornado ==
Prior to the Snyder tornado, a first tornado developed at 6:45 PM CST near Carmel in Greer County, which is about one hour northwest of Wichita Falls, Texas. This tornado killed at least 10 people. Numerous homes, farmsteads and a school house sustained heavy damage or were destroyed. The tornado lifted northeast of Lock (in present-day Jackson County). A second and more destructive tornado touched down just after 8:00 PM CST near the Kiowa/Greer County line and merged with the remnants of the first cyclone. It also proceeded northeast across the Red River Valley and Otter Creek region. At around 8:45 PM CST (after dark), it struck the town of Snyder, killing 97 people. Structures in the western and northern part of the town were completely demolished, with some homes being swept away. One hundred homes were leveled and 150 were badly damaged. The tornado lifted northeast of Snyder shortly after 9:00 PM CST. Another tornado from a different supercell, which previously killed two in Elk City in Beckham County, killed three more in Quinlan, Oklahoma, which is about two hours northeast of Snyder.

== Aftermath ==
In 1905, only telephones and telegraphs existed which made recovery efforts difficult, especially since both methods of communications were knocked out by the tornado. People had to walk to surrounding regions in order to get help and assistance. In the coming days, several neighboring towns across southern and central Oklahoma assisted in the recovery efforts, with doctors being assigned and many supplies shipped in by trains towards the devastated region. One of the doctors to respond to the area was Doctor George Fowler Border, of Mangum, Oklahoma, founder of the first hospital in the region.

== Records and similar events ==
The Fujita scale was not established at that time, but due to the heavy damage, the tornado has been retroactively rated F5. In recorded history, the tornado was one of the deadliest in the state of Oklahoma. At the time the event occurred, it was the second deadliest F5 tornado ever, being surpassed by the 1899 New Richmond tornado which killed 117 (and still stands as the deadliest in Wisconsin history and 9th overall in the United States). The Snyder tornado was the deadliest in Oklahoma history until it was surpassed by the Woodward County tornado on April 9, 1947, which killed at least 181, 113 of those fatalities being in Oklahoma alone. The Snyder tornado still stands today as the 2nd deadliest tornado ever in the state.

Another tornado, rated F4, was recorded in the immediate area on May 1, 1954. The tornado, which originated from North Texas, did not cause any fatalities in the Snyder area.

Other similar outbreaks, which had the same meteorological dynamics, include the 1955 Great Plains tornado outbreak - which killed 102 including 80 in Udall, Kansas, the 1979 Red River Valley tornado outbreak - which killed at least 54, including 42 in Wichita Falls, the 1991 Andover tornado outbreak - which killed 21, including 4 in Wichita and 13 in Andover, Kansas, the 1999 Oklahoma tornado outbreak - which killed 48 in and around Oklahoma City, Wichita and southern Tennessee, and the Greensburg, Kansas, outbreak in May 2007 - which killed 14, including 11 in and around Greensburg, Kansas. This last tornado was the first EF5 tornado under the new Enhanced Fujita scale, that started in the USA on February 1, 2007.

== See also ==
- Tornadoes in Oklahoma
- List of North American tornadoes and tornado outbreaks
- List of F5 tornadoes
- Snyder, Oklahoma
