= Rocky, Oklahoma =

- Town
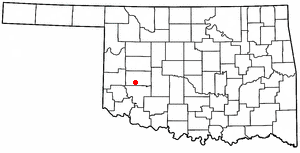
- Location of Rocky, Oklahoma
- Coordinates: 35°09′23″N 99°03′35″W
- Country: United States
- State: Oklahoma
- County: Washita

Government
  - Mayor: David L. Jones
  - Fire chief: Kolt Tiniwood Gray

Area
  - Total: 0.21 sq mi (0.54 km^{2})
  - Land: 0.21 sq mi (0.54 km^{2})
  - Water: 0 sq mi (0.00 km^{2})
- Elevation: 1,647 ft (502 m)

Population (2020)
  - Total: 128
  - Density: 609.2/sq mi (235.23/km^{2})
- Time zone: UTC-6 (Central (CST))
  - Summer (DST): UTC-5 (CDT)
- ZIP code: 73661
- Area code: 580
- FIPS code: 40-63700
- GNIS feature ID: 2412566

Rocky is a town in Washita County, Oklahoma, United States. As of the 2020 census, Rocky had a population of 128. The town lies along U.S. Route 183.

== History ==
Two men, W. F. Shultz and John C. Riffee, arrived at this location in 1897 to open a trading establishment with the local natives. (Note: This area was part of what was then known as Oklahoma Territory.) They erected a building constructed of rock they gathered at the Kiowa Reservation, about 8 miles (13 km) southwest of their site. They opened for business in 1898 as the Rocky Mercantile Store. (Note: The Kiowas referred to the store as the "Rocky Man Store.) The community was named for the store. A post office was established inside the store on July 12, 1898, with John Riffee named as the first postmaster. According to the local newspaper, Rocky handled more than one-third of all mail delivered in Washita County in 1906.

The Orange Blossom School System was organized about 0.5 miles (0.80 km) south of Rocky in 1902. The town built a new school in 1907. The Works Progress Administration built another school building in the late 1930s. However, the 1930 census marked the highest point of Rocky's growth, so no more schools were ever built. Instead, Rocky voters closed the district and merged it into the Sentinel district in 1967. The WPA-built school became a community center.

The Blackwell, Enid and Southwestern Railroad (BES) built a line through Rocky in 1902. The area around the community already had established as a producer of wheat, hay, and cotton. These were mostly shipped to market by rail. BES later was merged into the St. Louis and San Francisco Railway, (commonly known as the Frisco). By 1906, Rocky's economic base had added three grain elevators, three cotton gins, and considerable hay and livestock.

== Geography ==
According to the United States Census Bureau, the town has a total area of 0.2 square miles (0.52 km^{2}), all land. Lake Hobart (also known as Lake Rocky) is just to the northwest of Rocky.

== Demographics ==
Historical population
| Census | Pop. | Note | %± |
|---|---|---|---|
| 1910 | 378 | | — |
| 1920 | 322 | | −14.8% |
| 1930 | 518 | | 60.9% |
| 1940 | 442 | | −14.7% |
| 1950 | 366 | | −17.2% |
| 1960 | 343 | | −6.3% |
| 1970 | 260 | | −24.2% |
| 1980 | 242 | | −6.9% |
| 1990 | 181 | | −25.2% |
| 2000 | 174 | | −3.9% |
| 2010 | 162 | | −6.9% |
| 2020 | 128 | | −21.0% |
U.S. Decennial Census

=== 2020 census ===
As of the 2020 census, Rocky had a population of 128. The median age was 41.1 years. 24.2% of residents were under the age of 18 and 22.7% of residents were 65 years of age or older. For every 100 females there were 116.9 males, and for every 100 females age 18 and over there were 110.9 males age 18 and over.

0.0% of residents lived in urban areas, while 100.0% lived in rural areas.

There were 56 households in Rocky, of which 26.8% had children under the age of 18 living in them. Of all households, 35.7% were married-couple households, 25.0% were households with a male householder and no spouse or partner present, and 33.9% were households with a female householder and no spouse or partner present. About 32.1% of all households were made up of individuals and 17.9% had someone living alone who was 65 years of age or older.

There were 77 housing units, of which 27.3% were vacant. The homeowner vacancy rate was 0.0% and the rental vacancy rate was 0.0%.

Racial composition as of the 2020 census
| Race | Number | Percent |
|---|---|---|
| White | 120 | 93.8% |
| Black or African American | 0 | 0.0% |
| American Indian and Alaska Native | 1 | 0.8% |
| Asian | 1 | 0.8% |
| Native Hawaiian and Other Pacific Islander | 0 | 0.0% |
| Some other race | 0 | 0.0% |
| Two or more races | 6 | 4.7% |
| Hispanic or Latino (of any race) | 5 | 3.9% |

=== 2000 census ===
As of the census of 2000, there were 174 people, 77 households, and 50 families residing in the town. The population density was 771.6 inhabitants per square mile (297.9/km^{2}). There were 85 housing units at an average density of 376.9 per square mile (145.5/km^{2}). The racial makeup of the town was 91.95% White, 4.02% Native American, 2.87% from other races, and 1.15% from two or more races. Hispanic or Latino of any race were 3.45% of the population.

There were 77 households, out of which 22.1% had children under the age of 18 living with them, 57.1% were married couples living together, 6.5% had a female householder with no husband present, and 33.8% were non-families. 31.2% of all households were made up of individuals, and 15.6% had someone living alone who was 65 years of age or older. The average household size was 2.26 and the average family size was 2.84.

In the town, the population was spread out, with 20.1% under the age of 18, 8.0% from 18 to 24, 21.3% from 25 to 44, 26.4% from 45 to 64, and 24.1% who were 65 years of age or older. The median age was 45 years. For every 100 females, there were 85.1 males. For every 100 females age 18 and over, there were 85.3 males.

The median income for a household in the town was $30,972, and the median income for a family was $42,500. Males had a median income of $21,786 versus $20,500 for females. The per capita income for the town was $14,193. About 10.4% of families and 15.8% of the population were below the poverty line, including 14.9% of those under the age of eighteen and 24.3% of those 65 or over.

== Notable people ==
- Bobby Baldock, United States federal appellate judge (Tenth Circuit Court of Appeals)
- Bill Devin, businessperson, car builder and racing driver
- Gary Hill, basketball player, 11th overall pick of 1963 NBA draft
- Bud Koper, basketball player, 14th overall pick of 1964 NBA draft
- Joshua B. Lee, teacher, politician, attended school and later taught briefly in Rocky
