= Snyder, Oklahoma =

- City
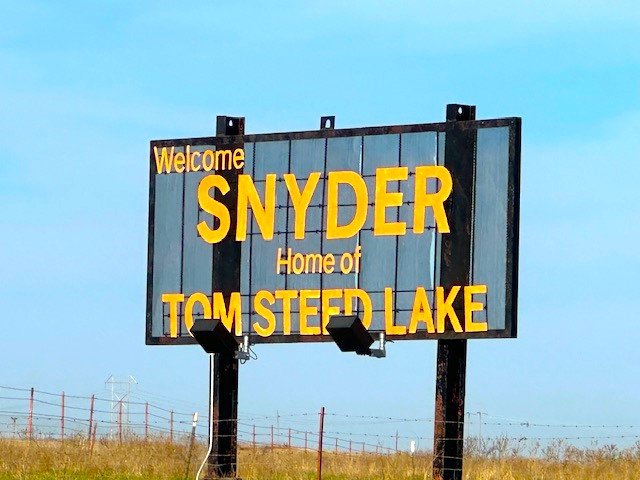
- Roadside welcome sign, 3-2025

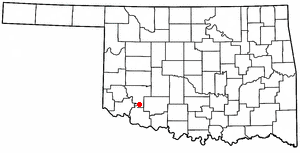
- Location of Snyder, Oklahoma
- Coordinates: 34°39′19″N 98°57′12″W
- Country: United States
- State: Oklahoma
- County: Kiowa

Area
  - Total: 1.20 sq mi (3.12 km^{2})
  - Land: 1.20 sq mi (3.12 km^{2})
  - Water: 0 sq mi (0.00 km^{2})
- Elevation: 1,352 ft (412 m)

Population (2020)
  - Total: 1,301
  - Density: 1,079.4/sq mi (416.76/km^{2})
- Time zone: UTC-6 (Central (CST))
  - Summer (DST): UTC-5 (CDT)
- ZIP code: 73566
- Area code: 580
- FIPS code: 40-68400
- GNIS feature ID: 2411916

Snyder is a city in Kiowa County, Oklahoma, United States. The population was 1,301 at the time of the 2020 Census.

== History ==
The community of Snyder was established in Oklahoma Territory, just 2 miles (3.2 km) south of Mountain Park in 1902. The founder was Charles G. Jones of Oklahoma City, president of the Oklahoma City and Western Railroad, (Note: Charles G. Jones and Ed Overholtzer founded the Oklahoma City and Western Railroad, which was later acquired by the St. Louis and San Francisco Railway.) who had a dispute with that municipality. Jones named the new town for Bryan Snyder, an employee of the St. Louis and San Francisco Railway (Frisco), which ran north and south through the townsite.

In 1905, a tornado hit Snyder and killed 97 people, including the superintendent of public schools. Fires in 1906 and 1909 destroyed most of the wooden buildings along Main Street. These were quickly replaced by brick buildings. By the time of statehood in 1907, Snyder had a population of 607 residents. The number grew to 1,122 in 1910.

== Geography ==
Snyder is located at the junction of U.S. routes 62 and 183. It is also 28 miles (45 km) south of Hobart, 22 miles (35 km) east of Altus and 36 miles (58 km) west of Lawton.

According to the United States Census Bureau, Snyder has a total area of 1.3 square miles (3.4 km^{2}), all land.

== Demographics ==
Historical population
Census	Pop.	Note	%±
1910	1,122		—
1920	1,197		6.7%
1930	1,195		−0.2%
1940	1,278		6.9%
1950	1,646		28.8%
1960	1,663		1.0%
1970	1,671		0.5%
1980	1,848		10.6%
1990	1,619		−12.4%
2000	1,509		−6.8%
2010	1,394		−7.6%
2020	1,301		−6.7%
U.S. Decennial Census

=== 2020 census ===
As of the 2020 census, Snyder had a population of 1,301. The median age was 40.9 years. 25.1% of residents were under the age of 18 and 21.8% of residents were 65 years of age or older. For every 100 females there were 94.5 males, and for every 100 females age 18 and over there were 90.8 males age 18 and over.

0% of residents lived in urban areas, while 100.0% lived in rural areas.

There were 532 households in Snyder, of which 31.8% had children under the age of 18 living in them. Of all households, 40.4% were married-couple households, 22.6% were households with a male householder and no spouse or partner present, and 30.1% were households with a female householder and no spouse or partner present. About 33.9% of all households were made up of individuals and 16.2% had someone living alone who was 65 years of age or older.

There were 651 housing units, of which 18.3% were vacant. Among occupied housing units, 64.1% were owner-occupied and 35.9% were renter-occupied. The homeowner vacancy rate was 2.8% and the rental vacancy rate was 16.6%.

Racial composition as of the 2020 census
Race	Percent
White	78.9%
Black or African American	5.4%
American Indian and Alaska Native	3.6%
Asian	0.5%
Native Hawaiian and Other Pacific Islander	0%
Some other race	4.8%
Two or more races	6.8%
Hispanic or Latino (of any race)	13.8%

=== 2000 census ===
As of the 2000 census, there were 1,509 people, 607 households, and 398 families residing in the city. The population density was 1,190.6 inhabitants per square mile (459.7/km^{2}). There were 761 housing units at an average density of 600.4 per square mile (231.8/km^{2}). The racial makeup of the city was 84.49% White, 7.02% African American, 2.45% Native American, 0.07% Pacific Islander, 4.64% from other races, and 1.33% from two or more races. Hispanic or Latino of any race were 10.21% of the population.

There were 607 households, out of which 31.5% had children under the age of 18 living with them, 46.8% were married couples living together, 12.7% had a female householder with no husband present, and 34.4% were non-families. 31.8% of all households were made up of individuals, and 16.5% had someone living alone who was 65 years of age or older. The average household size was 2.41 and the average family size was 3.01.

In the city, the population was spread out, with 27.2% under the age of 18, 8.7% from 18 to 24, 24.3% from 25 to 44, 21.0% from 45 to 64, and 18.8% who were 65 years of age or older. The median age was 38 years. For every 100 females, there were 87.0 males. For every 100 females age 18 and over, there were 83.5 males.

The median income for a household in the city was $23,295, and the median income for a family was $32,167. Males had a median income of $26,324 versus $17,386 for females. The per capita income for the city was $13,188. About 21.5% of families and 25.3% of the population were below the poverty line, including 30.6% of those under age 18 and 17.0% of those age 65 or over.

== Economy ==
The economy of Snyder and the surrounding area is largely dependent on farming and ranching. Important crops are cotton, corn, wheat, and hay.

== Parks and recreation ==
Great Plains State Park, on Tom Steed Reservoir, is 6.9 miles north of town.

Wichita Mountains Wildlife Refuge is 14.5 miles northeast.

The scenic cobblestone community of Medicine Park on Lake Lawtonka is 16.1 miles east-northeast.

Lake Frederick is 18 miles south-southeast.

== Notable people ==
- James V. McClintic, (1878–1948), was a politician, attorney and farmer who moved from Texas to Snyder in 1902.
- Jack L. Treadwell (1919–1977), was a highly decorated U.S. Army officer who was living in Snyder when he enlisted in 1941.

== Gallery ==
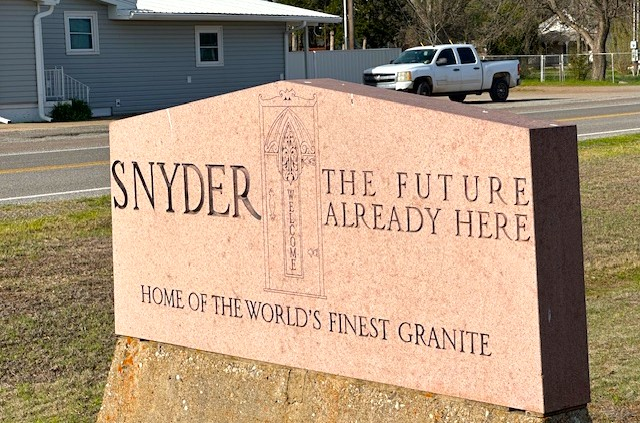
Granite welcome sign, 3-2025

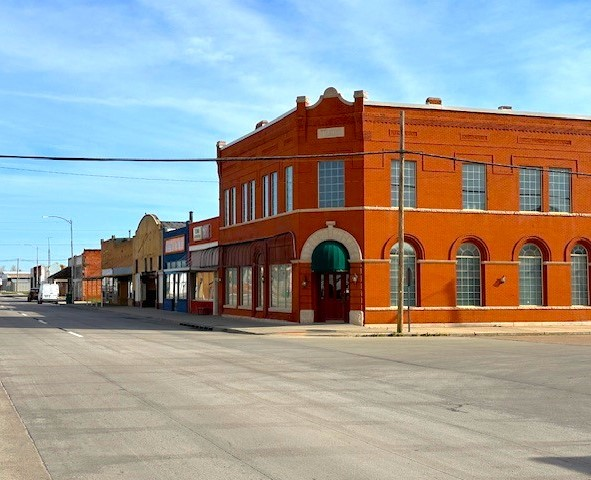
Old bank building and downtown at Snyder, 3-2025

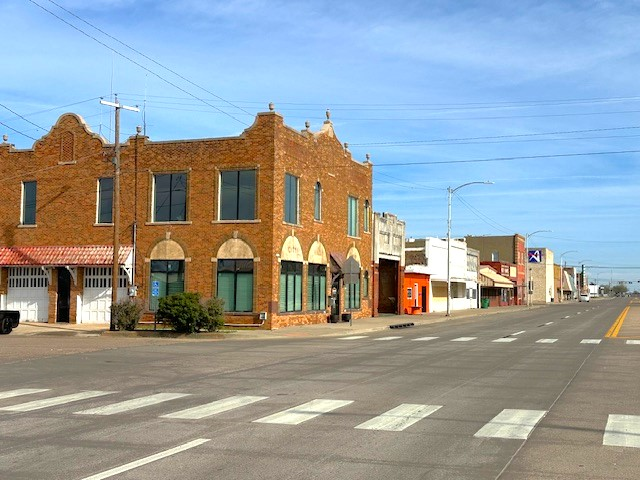
City Hall in downtown Snyder, 3-2025

== See also ==
- 1905 Snyder, Oklahoma tornado
