= Lake Hobart =

- Rocky Lake
- Location within Oklahoma Location within the United States
- Location: Washita County, Oklahoma
- Coordinates: 35°10′41″N 99°4′34″W
- Type: Reservoir
- Primary inflows: Little Elk Creek
- Primary outflows: Little Elk Creek
- Catchment area: 154 square kilometres (59 mi^{2})
- Surface area: 340 acres (1.4 km^{2})
- Average depth: 4 feet (1.2 m)
- Water volume: 4,210 acre-feet (5,190,000 m^{3})
- Shore length^{1}: 5 miles (8.0 km)
- Surface elevation: 1,647 feet (502 m)
- Settlements: Hobart, Oklahoma; Rocky, Oklahoma
- ^{1} Shore length is not a well-defined measure.

Lake Hobart, also known as Rocky Lake, is a reservoir in Washita County, Oklahoma, just to the northwest of Rocky, off U.S. Route 183 and the N2200 and N2190 roads. It is 9.5 miles (15.3 km) from the city of Hobart, Oklahoma, for which the lake was named. The reservoir was created as part of the Washita Basin Project (Note: The Washita Basin Project also included the construction of Foss Reservoir.) in the 1950s, to improve water supply in the area by constructing a dam across Little Elk Creek. The Clinton-Cordell-Hobart Aqueduct carries water from the reservoir to the three communities for which it is named. It is popular with fisherman and boaters. The Grissom Cemetery lies near the northern side of the lake.

The earthen dam is 29 feet (8.8 m) high and 1,950 feet (590 m) long. The surface area is 340 acres (1,400,000 m^{2}), normal capacity is 4210 acre-feet and the maximum capacity is 6340 acre feet. The maximum discharge is 53600 cubic feet per second.
