= KWHW (AM) =

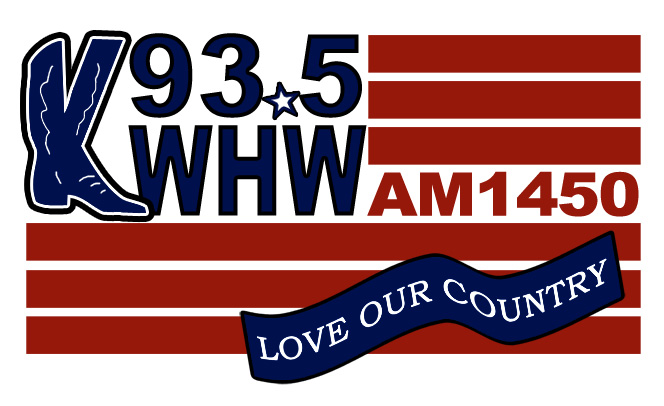
- Altus, Oklahoma; United States
- Frequencies: 1450 kHz; (C-QUAM AM stereo)
- Branding: Pure Country

Programming
- Language: English
- Format: Country music
- Affiliations: Westwood One

Ownership
- Owner: James G Boles, Jr.
- Sister stations: KQTZ; KPRO

History
- First air date: April 2, 1947
- Call sign meaning: "Wimberly Harrington Wimberly"

Technical information
- Licensing authority: FCC
- Facility ID: 1195
- Class: C
- Power: 668 watts (day); 668 watts (night)
- Transmitter coordinates: 34°37′35″N 99°20′11″W
- Translator: (96.9 MHz) K245CY (Altus)

Links
- Public license information: Public file; LMS
- Website: paradisebroadcasting.com/kwhw

KWHW (1450 AM) is an American radio station licensed to serve Altus, Oklahoma. Established in 1947, KWHW is owned by James G Boles, Jr, it airs a full service mix of music, news, sports, and local programming. The station is simulcast on sister station KPRO (93.5 FM).

== Programming ==
KWHW broadcasts a full-service country music format along with farm reports on weekdays. Sunday programming is primarily church broadcasts and gospel music programming. KWHW airs a tradio program called "Swap Shop" on weekday and Saturday mornings. The station broadcasts the meetings of the Altus City Council on the first and third Tuesdays of each month. KWHW station also airs select sporting events involving Altus High School and the Oklahoma State Cowboys. Some of the station's news and music programming comes from Westwood One.

KWHW's morning show is hosted by Eddie Wilcoxen. He is a published poet, recognized landscape designer, karate champion, and was named as an official Olympic Hero in 1996. In January 2011, Wilcoxen was named Poet Laureate for the state of Oklahoma for 2011 though 2012 by the Oklahoma Humanities Council.

== History ==
This station began broadcasting on April 2, 1947, at 1450 kHz with 250 watts of power under the ownership of the Altus Broadcasting Company. The company was 50% owned by local newspaper The Altus Times-Democrat. Frank E. Wimberly served as both the company's president and the station's general manager. The station was assigned the call sign KWHW by the Federal Communications Commission (FCC). "WHW" are the initials for Will Harrington Wimberly, Frank's brother. Harrington Wimberly was the publisher for the Altus-Times Democrat from 1929 to 1966. In 1961, the station was granted a construction permit by the FCC to increase their daytime power to 1,000 watts.

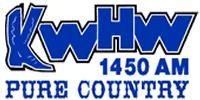
Former branding

On September 9, 1969, the station was acquired by KWHW Radio, Inc., with Hugh Garnett serving as president and general manager. By 1974, George Wilburn had taken on the general manager role and KWHW broadcast a middle of the road music format with 30 hours of country music and one hour of gospel music each week as "special" programming. On April 1, 1974, KWHW-FM signed on at 93.5 FM. In 1979, Eddie Wilcoxen became the station's music director.

In April 1984, broadcast license holder KWHW Radio, Inc., reached an agreement to sell this station and sister station KWHW-FM to Altus Radio, Inc. The deal was approved by the FCC on May 29, 1984, and the transaction was formally consummated on July 2, 1984. During the 1980s, the station transitioned from middle of the road to a country music format.

In October 2003, Altus Radio, Inc., made a deal to sell this station, along with KRKZ (the former KWHW-FM) in Altus and KQTZ in Hobart, to Monarch Broadcasting, Inc, for a combined sale price of $1,800,000. The deal gained FCC approval on December 12, 2003, and the transaction was consummated on December 31, 2003.

Effective September 8, 2021, Monarch Broadcasting sold KWHW, KQTZ, KWHW-FM, and translator K245CY to James G Boles, Jr. for $1.
