= Oklahoma City and Western Railroad =

Overview
- Locale: Oklahoma and Texas
- Dates of operation: 1901–1907

Technical
- Track gauge: 4 ft 8 1/2 in (1,435 mm)
- Length: 183 mi (295 km)

The Oklahoma City and Western Railroad, together with its affiliate the Oklahoma City and Texas Railroad, built a line from Oklahoma City through Lawton, Oklahoma and on to Quanah, Texas in the 1901-1903 timeframe. By the time of its completion, the line was owned by the St. Louis-San Francisco Railway (Frisco), and all assets were absorbed into the Frisco in 1907.

== History ==
The Oklahoma City and Western Railroad Company was the brainchild of Charles G. Jones, a developer and former mayor of Oklahoma City. Though incorporated July 15, 1899 under the laws of Indian Territory, the railroad made little progress until the latter part of 1901, when a company called Johnston Brothers was contracted to do the construction. Johnston Brothers built from Oklahoma City into Lawton, Oklahoma within a month of the latter's founding in August, 1901.

Johnston Brothers was paid in stock, and ended up with all of it. On October 15, 1901, Johnston Brothers sold the stock to St. Louis Trust Company, and on April 4, 1902, the Trust Company sold it to the Frisco. Part of Frisco's purchase agreement specified that the line had to be continued into Quanah, Texas. The attraction to Quanah, besides its connection with the Fort Worth and Denver City Railway, was the chance to service the gypsum deposits around nearby Acme, Texas, since gypsum was a natural plaster-like building material.

The Oklahoma company completed the trackage to the south bank of the Red River, giving it about 174 single-track miles total. The corporate entity intended to build the portion in Texas from the Red River to Quanah was the Oklahoma City and Texas Railroad Company, which had already been chartered on December 26, 1901. The extension was built and opened March 29, 1903, with the Texas portion being nine miles. The Texas company was separately sold to the Frisco on July 25, 1904. All trackage was operated by the Frisco from the beginning.

The road brought changes along its route. At Mountain Park, Oklahoma, a dispute between Jones and a landowner over a site for a depot caused the railroad to re-route two miles to the south through Snyder, Oklahoma, resulting in 41 of the 47 businesses in Mountain Park relocating to Snyder. The town of Elgin, Oklahoma was developed by Jones along the trackage and was originally named CeeGee after his initials, but the name was changed when the railroad objected. Jones also platted Mustang, Oklahoma in November, 1901, even though a settlement there had possessed a post office since 1895.

All assets of both companies were officially absorbed into the Frisco on July 18, 1907.
