= Tom Steed Reservoir =

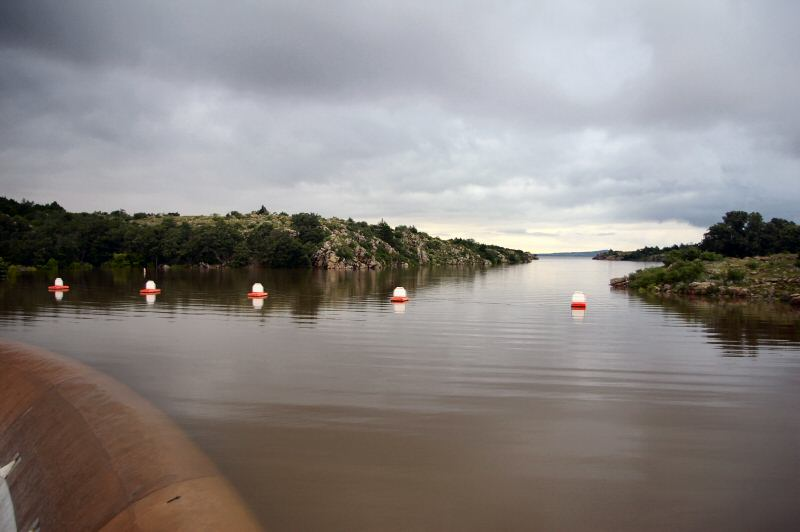
- (June 2007)

- Location within Oklahoma Location within the United States
- Location: Kiowa County, Oklahoma
- Coordinates: 34.76°N 98.99°W
- Lake type: reservoir
- Primary inflows: West Otter Creek
- Primary outflows: West Otter Creek
- Basin countries: United States
- Surface area: 6,400 acres (2,600 ha)
- Surface elevation: 1,407 ft (429 m)
- Settlements: Snyder, Oklahoma

Created in 1975, Tom Steed Reservoir is a reservoir in Kiowa County, Oklahoma, 6 miles (9.7 km) northwest of the city of Snyder, Oklahoma. (Note: The closest town is Mountain Park, Oklahoma, 3 miles (4.8 km) away.) The reservoir area was created by damming West Otter Creek and diverting flows of Elk Creek through the Bretch Diversion Canal by Mountain Park Dam. Tom Steed Reservoir is the main feature of the Mountain Park Project of the U.S. Bureau of Reclamation. It provides municipal and industrial water to the cities of Snyder, Altus, and Frederick, as well as the Hackberry Flat Wildlife Management Area.

== Dam ==
Mountain Park Dam is located just upstream of Snyder Dam, on Otter Creek near Mountain Park, Oklahoma. A thin double-curvature concrete arch flanked by concrete thrust blocks, Mountain Park Dam is 535 feet (163 m) in length with a maximum structural height of 133 feet (41 m). This dam and the rolled earth East and West Dike embankments, which extend 10,311 and 13,235 feet (3143 and 4034 m), respectively, form the Tom Steed Reservoir. The reservoir has a total capacity of 117,825 acre-feet (145,335,000 m^{3}), an active capacity of 109,276 acre-feet (134,790,000 m^{3}), and a surface area at the top of conservation pool of approximately 6,400 acres (26 km²). Its elevation is 1,407 feet (429 m).

== Recreation and wildlife ==
The Oklahoma Tourism and Recreation Department administers 6,100 acres (25 km²) on the east and south shores of the reservoir. Public recreation facilities on the east side include shelters, tables, grills, a comfort station, a boat launching ramp, and a swimming beach. The area south of the dam along Otter Creek offers picnic facilities and a bridge across the creek which leads to a nature trail through large cottonwood, ash, elm, walnut, and pecan trees.

The Oklahoma Department of Wildlife Conservation administers 5,150 acres (21 km²) of the west and north side of the reservoir area. Waterfowl and dove are plentiful, and other upland game species are increasing as more food and cover are developed. An extensive tree and shrub planting program continues to increase wildlife habitat. The reservoir is one of the best fishing areas in southwest Oklahoma, offering catfish, crappie, largemouth black bass, and other varieties.

Great Plains State Park is located on the shore of Tom Steed Reservoir.
