= KQTZ =

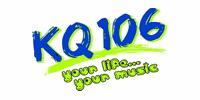
- Hobart, Oklahoma; United States
- Broadcast area: Lawton, Oklahoma
- Frequency: 105.9 MHz
- Branding: KQ-106

Programming
- Format: Hot adult contemporary
- Affiliations: Citadel Media, Westwood One

Ownership
- Owner: James G Boles, Jr.
- Sister stations: KWHW, KPRO

History
- First air date: May 28, 1979

Technical information
- Licensing authority: FCC
- Facility ID: 22820
- Class: C
- ERP: 100,000 watts
- HAAT: 311 meters (1,020 ft)
- Transmitter coordinates: 34°52′15″N 99°17′36″W

Links
- Public license information: Public file; LMS
- Website: kq106.fm

KQTZ (105.9 FM) is an American radio station licensed to serve the community of Hobart, Oklahoma. The station is currently owned and operated by James G Boles, Jr.

KQTZ, along with KWHW (1450 AM) and KRKZ (now KPRO, 93.5 FM), was acquired from Altus Radio, Inc., by Monarch Broadcasting in 2003. The stations, as well as translator K245CU were acquired by James G Boles, Jr. effective September 8, 2021.

KQTZ broadcasts a hot adult contemporary music format to the greater Lawton, Oklahoma, area. The station features programming from Citadel Media and Dial Global.

Former 'Mike FM' branding
