= Mountain Park Dam =

Dam in Kiowa County, Oklahoma, United States

Coordinates: 34.7388°N 98.9875°W

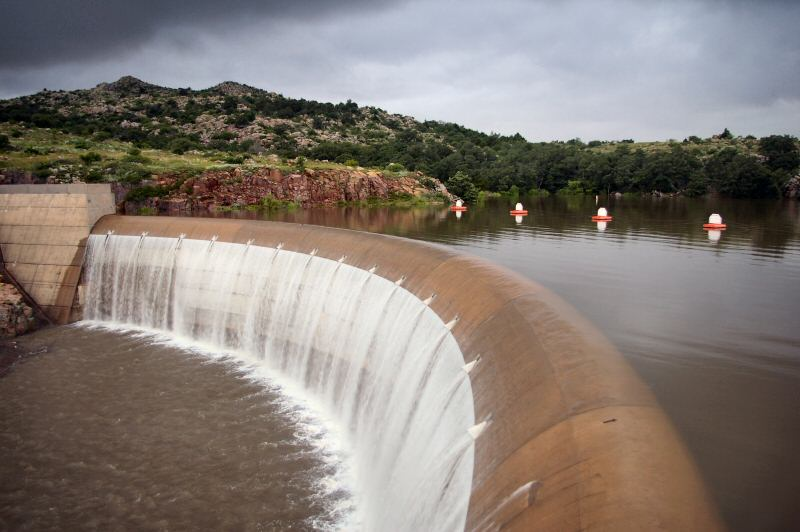
Water cresting over top of dam, June 29, 2007.

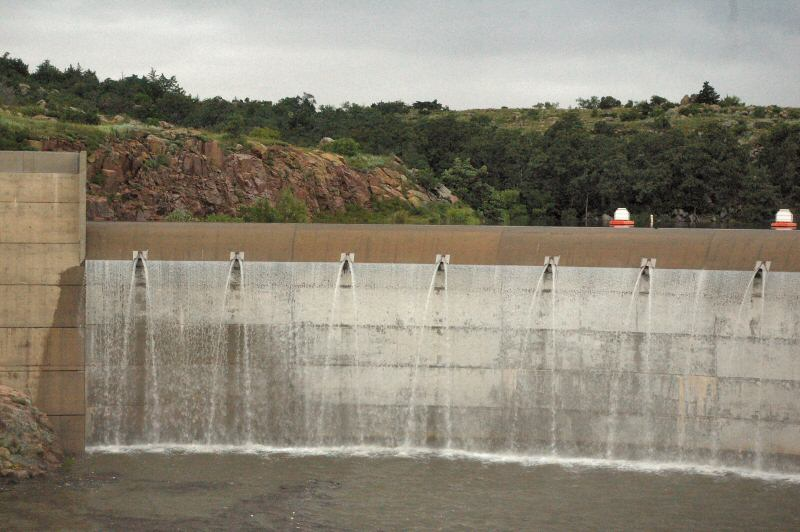
View from just downstream

Mountain Park Dam (National ID # OK20502) is located just upstream of Snyder Dam, on Otter Creek near Mountain Park, Oklahoma. Snyder Lake was drained to accommodate construction of Mountain Park Dam, then restored upon completion of construction, which was performed by O'Neal Construction, Inc. of Ann Arbor, MI. The lake is maintained at sufficient elevation to provide a plunge pool for water released or spilled from the dam. Mountain Park dam impounds the waters of Tom Steed Reservoir.

A thin double-curvature concrete arch flanked by concrete thrust blocks, Mountain Park Dam is 535 feet (163 m) in length with a maximum structural height of 133 feet (41 m). This dam and the rolled earth East and West Dike embankments, which extend 10,311 feet (3,143 m) and 13,235 feet (4,034 m), respectively, form the Tom Steed Reservoir. The reservoir has a total capacity of 117,825 acre-feet (145,335,000 m^{3}), an active capacity of 109,276 acre-feet (134,790,000 m^{3}), and a surface area at the top of conservation pool of approximately 6,400 acres (26 km^{2}).

The outlet works for Mountain Park Dam are in the left thrust block and include three outlet pipes, trashracks, fish screens, emergency and operating slide gates, and motor-operated gate hoists. A 42-inch-diameter, joint-use outlet pipe is provided to release water into the aqueduct system; an 84-inch-diameter flood outlet pipe and a 15-inch-diameter river outlet pipe are provided to release floodwater and small streamflows. The joint-use outlet to the aqueduct system contains two gated intakes at elevations 1382.0 and 1401.0 to permit selection of the level of the reservoir from which water is to be withdrawn; water from both levels may be mixed. This outlet also is provided with fish screens.

The concrete arch portion of Mountain Park Dam functions as an uncontrolled, overflow spillway. The crest is at the top of the exclusive flood control pool at elevation 1,414.0, and is 320 feet (98 m) long measured along the axis of the dam. Concrete piers and training walls at each end of the spillway direct floodwater into and over the crest. Floodwaters fall into a plunge pool energy dissipater at the toe of the dam. The spillway is designed for a maximum discharge of 38,300 cubic feet (1,080 m^{3}) per second with the reservoir at elevation 1,423.6 feet (433.9 m).
