= KPRO (FM) =

- Altus, Oklahoma; United States
- Frequency: 93.5 MHz
- Branding: 93.5 KPRO Rocks

Programming
- Language: English
- Format: Rock music
- Affiliations: Westwood One; ABC News Radio

Ownership
- Owner: James G Boles, Jr.
- Sister stations: KQTZ; KWHW

History
- First air date: April 1, 1974
- Former call signs: KWHW-FM (1974–1984, 2011–2021); KRKZ (1984–2011)

Technical information
- Licensing authority: FCC
- Facility ID: 1196
- Class: C2
- ERP: 45,000 watts
- HAAT: 161 meters (528 ft)
- Transmitter coordinates: 34°26′20″N 99°30′8″W

Links
- Public license information: Public file; LMS
- Website: paradisebroadcasting.com/93-5-kpro/

KPRO (93.5 FM) is an American radio station licensed to serve Altus, Oklahoma, United States. The station, established in 1974, is owned and operated by James G Boles, Jr. It airs a full service mix of music, news, sports, and local programming.

== Programming ==
KPRO broadcasts a full-service rock music format. KPRO also airs select sporting events involving Altus High School and the Oklahoma State Cowboys. Some of the station's news and music programming comes from Westwood One and ABC News Radio.

KPRO's morning show is hosted by Eddie Wilcoxen. He is a published poet, recognized landscape designer, karate champion, and was named as an official Olympic Hero in 1996. In January 2011, Wilcoxen was named Poet Laureate for the state of Oklahoma for 2011 though 2012 by the Oklahoma Humanities Council.

== History ==
On April 1, 1974, KWHW-FM signed on at 93.5 FM as a sister station to KWHW (1450 AM). In April 1984, broadcast license holder KWHW Radio, Inc., reached an agreement to sell KWHW and KWHW-FM to Altus Radio, Inc. The deal was approved by the Federal Communications Commission (FCC) on May 29, 1984, and the transaction was formally consummated on July 2, 1984. The station's call sign was changed to KRKZ by the FCC on November 11, 1984.

In October 2003, Altus Radio, Inc., made a deal to sell this station, along with sister stations KWHW in Altus and KQTZ in Hobart, to Monarch Broadcasting, Inc, for a combined sale price of $1,800,000. The deal gained FCC approval on December 12, 2003, and the transaction was consummated on December 31, 2003.

The station was reassigned the KWHW-FM call sign by the FCC on May 30, 2011.

Effective September 8, 2021, Monarch Broadcasting sold KWHW-FM, KQTZ, KWHW, and translator K245CY to James G Boles, Jr. for $1. KWHW-FM became KPRO on October 7, 2021.
