= Hobart City Hall (Hobart, Oklahoma) =

- U.S. National Register of Historic Places
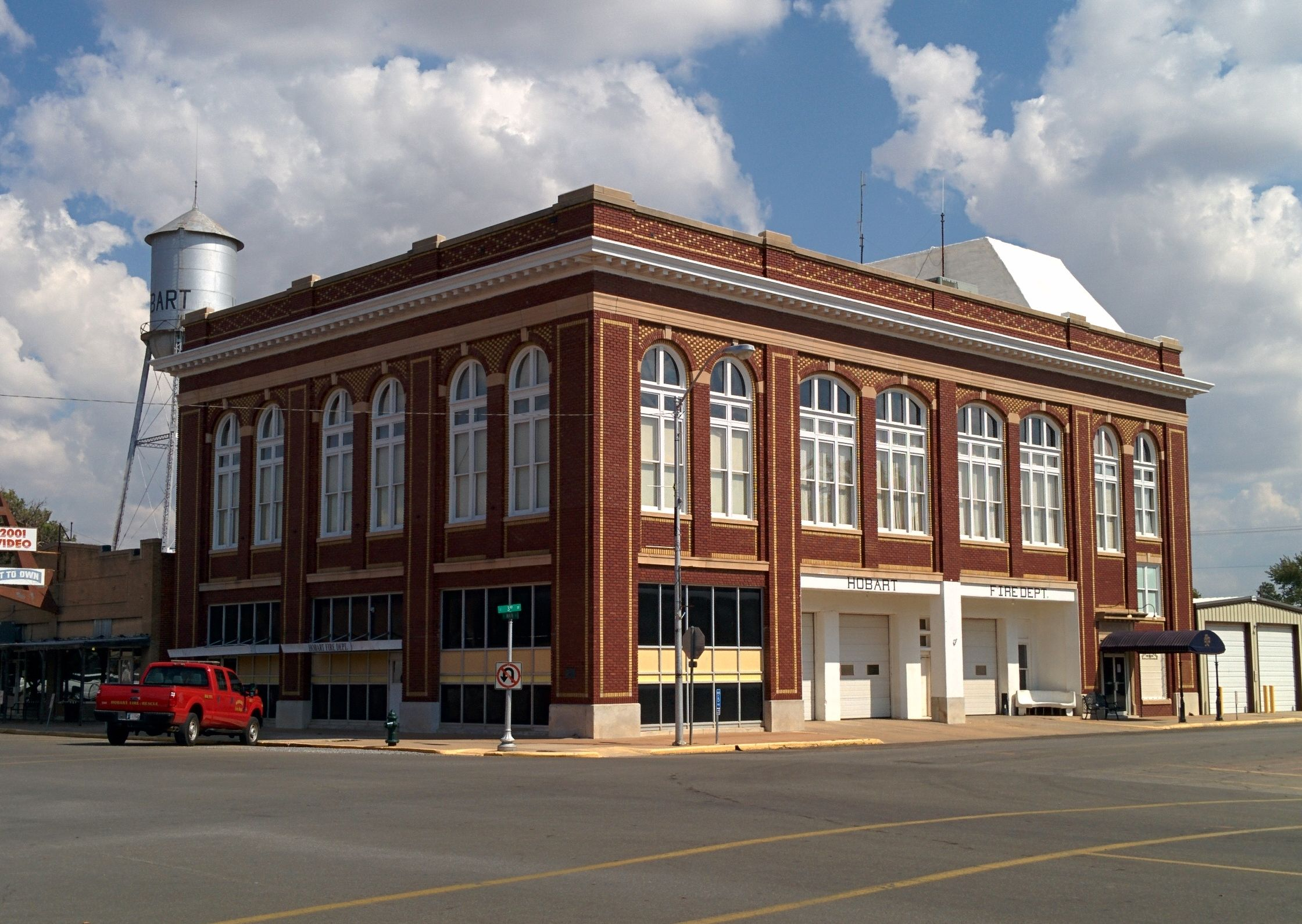

- Location within Oklahoma
- Location: Main and 3rd Sts., Hobart, Oklahoma
- Coordinates: 35°01′33″N 99°05′33″W
- Area: 1 acre (0.40 ha)
- Built: 1912
- Built by: Nix & Creasey
- Architect: W.A. Etherton
- NRHP reference No.: 78002240
- Added to NRHP: May 22, 1978

The Hobart City Hall in Hobart, Oklahoma, at Main and 3rd Sts., also known as Old City Hall, was built in 1912. It was listed on the National Register of Historic Places in 1978.

It was designed by W.A. Etherton of Stillwater, Oklahoma and was built by contractors Nix & Creasey of Hobart, Oklahoma.

It is a three-story building, 70 by 100 feet (21 m × 30 m) in plan, which included a 1,100-seat auditorium.
