= Bud Koper =

American basketball player (born 1942)

Personal information
- Born: August 9, 1942 (age 84) Rocky, Oklahoma
- Listed height: 6 ft 6 in (1.98 m)
- Listed weight: 210 lb (95 kg)

Career information
- High school: Rocky (Rocky, Oklahoma)
- College: Oklahoma City (1961–1964)
- NBA draft: 1964: 2nd round, 14th overall pick
- Drafted by: San Francisco Warriors
- Position: Shooting guard
- Number: 15

Career history
- 1964–1965: San Francisco Warriors

Career highlights
- First-team All-American – NABC (1964)
- Stats at NBA.com
- Stats at Basketball Reference

Herbert L. "Bud" Koper (born August 9, 1942) is an American former National Basketball Association (NBA) player. In his senior season at Oklahoma City University, Bud scored a school-record fifty points against North Texas State. Following the season, he was named a first team All-American by the USBWA and was invited to the U.S. Olympic tryouts. Bud was drafted with the seventh pick in the second round of the 1964 NBA draft by the San Francisco Warriors. He played in one NBA season for the Warriors, averaging 4.6 points, 1.1 rebounds, and 0.8 assists per game.

== Career statistics ==
Legend
GP	Games played	GS	Games started	MPG	Minutes per game
FG%	Field goal percentage	3P%	3-point field goal percentage	FT%	Free throw percentage
RPG	Rebounds per game	APG	Assists per game	SPG	Steals per game
BPG	Blocks per game	PPG	Points per game	**Bold**	Career high

=== NBA ===
==== Regular season ====
Year	Team	GP	MPG	FG%	FT%	RPG	APG	PPG
1964–65	San Francisco	54	11.7	.440	.833	1.1	.8	4.6
