= 1964–65 San Francisco Warriors season =

NBA professional basketball team season

- Head coach: Alex Hannum
- Arena: San Francisco Civic Auditorium

Results
- Record: 17–63 (.213)
- Place: Division: 5th (Western)
- Playoff finish: Did not qualify
- Stats at Basketball Reference

Local media
- Television: KRON-TV
- Radio: KSFO

The 1964–65 San Francisco Warriors season was the Warriors' 19th season in the NBA and 3rd in the San Francisco Bay Area.The Warriors' season began poorly and they experienced financial trouble. At the 1965 All-Star Weekend, Wilt Chamberlain was traded to the Philadelphia 76ers, the renamed former-rival and relocated Syracuse Nationals.

== Roster ==
1964–65 San Francisco Warriors roster
Players

Pos.	No.	Player	Height	Weight	DOB	From
G	16	Al Attles	6 ft 0 in (1.83 m)	175 lb (79 kg)		North Carolina A&T
C	18	Connie Dierking	6 ft 9 in (2.06 m)	222 lb (101 kg)		Cincinnati
G	15	Bud Koper	6 ft 6 in (1.98 m)	210 lb (95 kg)		Oklahoma City
G/F	9	George Lee	6 ft 4 in (1.93 m)	200 lb (91 kg)		Michigan
F	71	McCoy McLemore	6 ft 7 in (2.01 m)	230 lb (104 kg)		Drake
F	14	Tom Meschery	6 ft 6 in (1.98 m)	215 lb (98 kg)		Saint Mary's
F	17	Cotton Nash	6 ft 5 in (1.96 m)	215 lb (98 kg)		Kentucky
G	15	Paul Neumann	6 ft 1 in (1.85 m)	175 lb (79 kg)		Stanford
G	7	Gary Phillips	6 ft 3 in (1.91 m)	189 lb (86 kg)		Houston
G	5	Guy Rodgers	6 ft 0 in (1.83 m)	185 lb (84 kg)		Temple
F	34	John Rudometkin	6 ft 6 in (1.98 m)	205 lb (93 kg)		USC
F/C	42	Nate Thurmond	6 ft 11 in (2.11 m)	225 lb (102 kg)		Bowling Green

Coaches
Head coach
- Alex Hannum (USC)
Assistant(s)
- George Lee (Michigan)

Legend
- (DP) Unsigned draft pick
- (FA) Free agent
- (S) Suspended
- Injured

== Regular season ==
=== Season standings ===
Western Division	W	L	PCT	GB	Home	Road	Neutral	Div
x-Los Angeles Lakers	49	31	.613	–	25–13	21–16	3–2	25–15
x-St. Louis Hawks	45	35	.563	4	26–4	15–17	4–4	28–12
x-Baltimore Bullets	37	43	.463	12	23–14	12–19	2–10	22–18
Detroit Pistons	31	49	.388	18	13–17	11–20	7–12	18–22
San Francisco Warriors	17	63	.213	32	10–26	5–31	2–6	7–33

x – clinched playoff spot

=== Game log ===
1964–65 Game log
#	Date	Opponent	Score	High points	Record
1	October 17	@ Baltimore	101–121	Nate Thurmond (28)	0–1
2	October 18	@ Cincinnati	108–117	Tom Meschery (28)	0–2
3	October 21	@ Detroit	104–108	Guy Rodgers (20)	0–3
4	October 23	Los Angeles	94–92	Al Attles (21)	0–4
5	October 27	Baltimore	90–101	Nate Thurmond (28)	1–4
6	October 31	Baltimore	102–98	Guy Rodgers (26)	1–5
7	November 4	St. Louis	105–104	Wilt Chamberlain (37)	1–6
8	November 6	New York	127–133 (2OT)	Wilt Chamberlain (52)	2–6
9	November 7	@ Los Angeles	103–130	Wilt Chamberlain (21)	2–7
10	November 8	New York	121–130	Wilt Chamberlain (41)	3–7
11	November 10	@ Philadelphia	110–99	Wilt Chamberlain (36)	4–7
12	November 11	@ Boston	84–110	Wilt Chamberlain (24)	4–8
13	November 12	@ Detroit	99–121	Wilt Chamberlain (53)	4–9
14	November 14	@ St. Louis	94–108	Wilt Chamberlain (23)	4–10
15	November 15	@ Cincinnati	122–106	Wilt Chamberlain (62)	5–10
16	November 17	Cincinnati	114–108	Wilt Chamberlain (45)	5–11
17	November 21	Cincinnati	111–104	Wilt Chamberlain (46)	5–12
18	November 22	Detroit	99–97	Wilt Chamberlain (50)	5–13
19	November 24	@ New York	93–101	Wilt Chamberlain (36)	5–14
20	November 25	@ Boston	118–122	Wilt Chamberlain (37)	5–15
21	November 26	@ Philadelphia	117–128	Wilt Chamberlain (63)	5–16
22	November 28	Los Angeles	106–109	Wilt Chamberlain (40)	6–16
23	December 1	Baltimore	136–137 (2OT)	Wilt Chamberlain (56)	7–16
24	December 2	N Baltimore	114–120	Wilt Chamberlain (33)	7–17
25	December 4	Boston	85–112	Tom Meschery (25)	8–17
26	December 5	Boston	105–81	Tom Meschery (19)	8–18
27	December 8	St. Louis	113–93	Nate Thurmond (32)	8–19
28	December 11	Detroit	104–100	Wilt Chamberlain (40)	8–20
29	December 12	Detroit	107–124	Wilt Chamberlain (33)	9–20
30	December 14	N Philadelphia	112–119	Wilt Chamberlain (40)	9–21
31	December 15	@ New York	134–132 (OT)	Wilt Chamberlain (58)	10–21
32	December 16	@ Boston	106–107	Wilt Chamberlain (31)	10–22
33	December 18	Philadelphia	111–117	Wilt Chamberlain (41)	11–22
34	December 20	Philadelphia	113–111	Wilt Chamberlain (45)	11–23
35	December 22	N New York	118–124	Wilt Chamberlain (46)	11–24
36	December 26	@ Los Angeles	122–129	Wilt Chamberlain (41)	11–25
37	December 28	@ Cincinnati	108–113	Wilt Chamberlain (42)	11–26
38	December 29	@ St. Louis	104–122	Wilt Chamberlain (35)	11–27
39	December 30	N New York	102–118	Wilt Chamberlain (41)	11–28
40	January 1	@ New York	100–101	Wilt Chamberlain (29)	11–29
41	January 2	@ Baltimore	103–129	Wilt Chamberlain (43)	11–30
42	January 3	@ Baltimore	132–142	Wilt Chamberlain (53)	11–31
43	January 6	N Philadelphia	102–121	Wilt Chamberlain (29)	11–32
44	January 8	Boston	94–91	Wilt Chamberlain (30)	11–33
45	January 15	New York	89–87	Guy Rodgers (22)	11–34
46	January 16	New York	102–89	Tom Meschery (24)	11–35
47	January 21	@ Philadelphia	102–111	Tom Meschery (19)	11–36
48	January 22	@ Boston	94–104	Nate Thurmond (22)	11–37
49	January 24	@ Cincinnati	103–124	Nate Thurmond (31)	11–38
50	January 26	Cincinnati	115–107	Tom Meschery (26)	11–39
51	January 28	Cincinnati	90–105	Nate Thurmond (30)	12–39
52	January 30	Los Angeles	109–99	Nate Thurmond (24)	12–40
53	January 31	@ Los Angeles	94–96	Guy Rodgers (20)	12–41
54	February 2	@ New York	102–113	McLemore, Thurmond (22)	12–42
55	February 3	@ Detroit	106–111	Nate Thurmond (23)	12–43
56	February 5	N Baltimore	120–112	Paul Neumann (23)	13–43
57	February 6	@ St. Louis	101–108	Nate Thurmond (27)	13–44
58	February 7	@ St. Louis	103–126	Guy Rodgers (19)	13–45
59	February 9	N Philadelphia	114–132	Connie Dierking (30)	13–46
60	February 11	Philadelphia	100–106	Nate Thurmond (19)	14–46
61	February 12	@ Los Angeles	95–114	Guy Rodgers (27)	14–47
62	February 13	Los Angeles	129–105	Guy Rodgers (21)	14–48
63	February 16	Detroit	114–106	Tom Meschery (32)	14–49
64	February 18	Detroit	107–106	Meschery, Thurmond (23)	14–50
65	February 20	Boston	114–108	Guy Rodgers (28)	14–51
66	February 22	St. Louis	107–97	Nate Thurmond (24)	14–52
67	February 24	St. Louis	111–103	Nate Thurmond (26)	14–53
68	February 26	Boston	130–112	Gary Phillips (23)	14–54
69	February 28	@ Baltimore	116–129 (OT)	Nate Thurmond (30)	14–55
70	March 2	@ Cincinnati	105–121	Nate Thurmond (21)	14–56
71	March 3	@ Detroit	107–110	Nate Thurmond (29)	14–57
72	March 4	N Detroit	115–110	Nate Thurmond (25)	15–57
73	March 6	Cincinnati	97–93	Nate Thurmond (21)	15–58
74	March 8	Baltimore	111–102	Connie Dierking (19)	15–59
75	March 11	St. Louis	101–99	Guy Rodgers (22)	15–60
76	March 12	Los Angeles	115–93	Rodgers, Thurmond (25)	15–61
77	March 14	@ Boston	98–106	Nate Thurmond (26)	15–62
78	March 16	@ Philadelphia	115–107	Guy Rodgers (29)	16–62
79	March 17	@ St. Louis	94–101	Guy Rodgers (22)	16–63
80	March 20	@ Los Angeles	112–98	Attles, Neumann, Thurmond (16)	17–63

== Awards and records ==
- Wilt Chamberlain, NBA All-Star Game
- Nate Thurmond, NBA All-Star Game
