= Downtown Hobart Historic District =

Historic district in Oklahoma, United States

- U.S. National Register of Historic Places
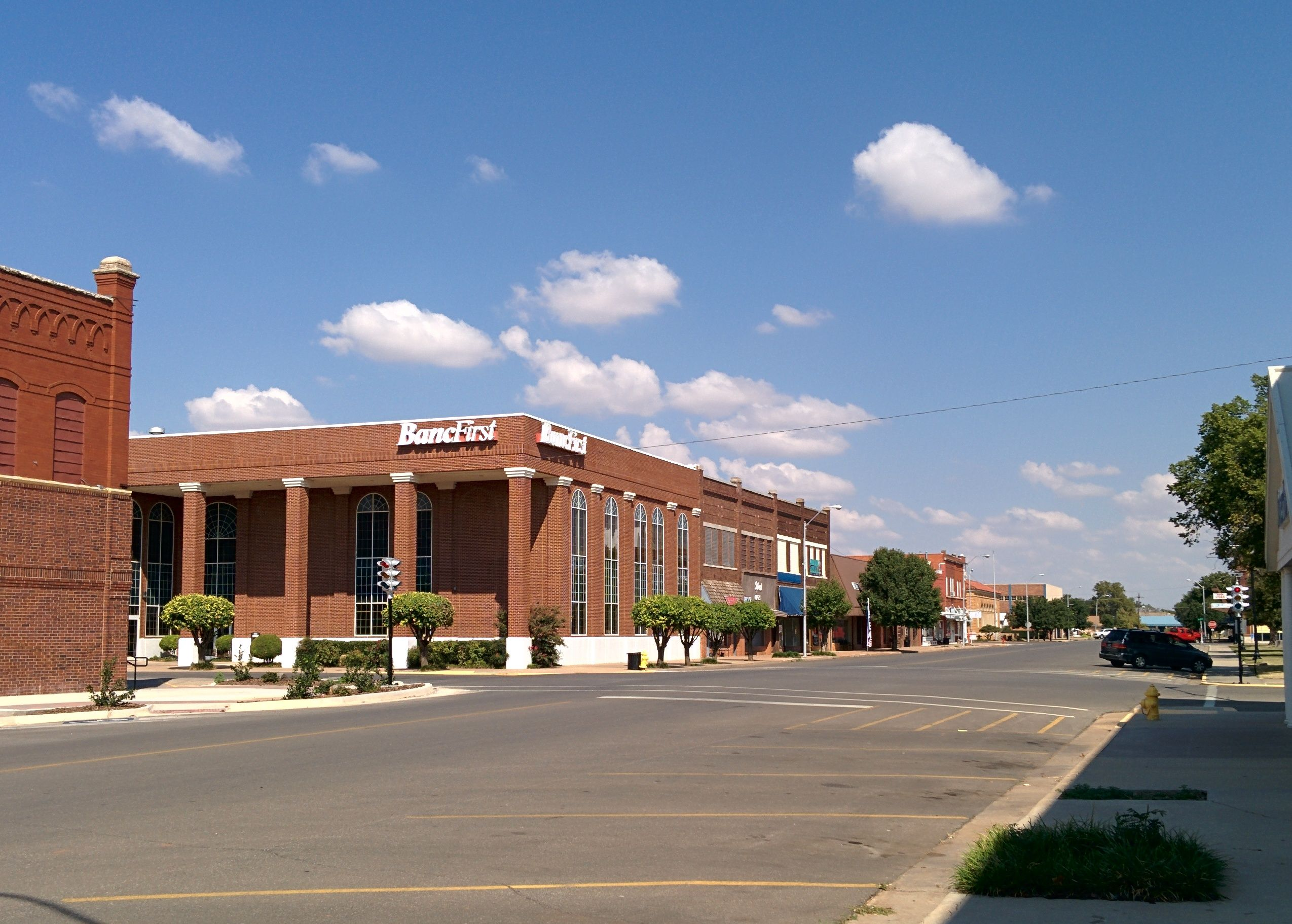

- Location within Oklahoma
- Location: Roughly bounded by Jefferson St., 3rd, Washington, 4th and 200 and 500 blk of S Main St., Hobart, Oklahoma
- Coordinates: 35°01′28″N 99°05′34″W
- Area: 36 acres (15 ha)
- Architect: McCanse, William; et.al
- NRHP reference No.: 05000130
- Added to NRHP: March 10, 2005

The Downtown Hobart Historic District, in Hobart, Oklahoma, is a 36 acres (15 ha) historic district which was listed on the National Register of Historic Places in 2005. The district is roughly bounded by Jefferson St., 3rd, Washington, 4th, and the 200 and 500 blocks of S. Main St.

It includes:

- the already-NRHP-listed Hobart Public Library, at 200 S. Main Street, built in 1912, a Carnegie library designed by architect William McCanse
- the Hobart City Hall, at 106 E. 3rd Street, also already NRHP-listed, built in 1912, designed by architect W. A. Etherton Etherton was also architect of NRHP-listed Haskell State School of Agriculture, at 808 E. College St. in Broken Arrow, Oklahoma.
- the Kiowa County Courthouse, at 314 S. Main Street, also already NRHP-listed, built in 1903/1935, designed by architect J. Riley Gordon
