= Mountain Park, Oklahoma =

- Town
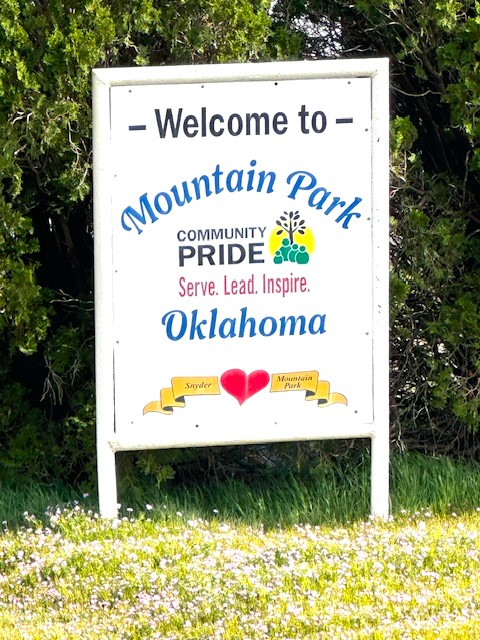
- Welcome sign, 3-2025

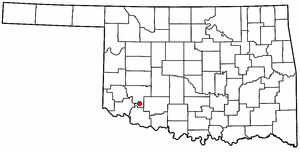
- Location of Mountain Park, Oklahoma
- Coordinates: 34°41′56″N 98°57′08″W
- Country: United States
- State: Oklahoma
- County: Kiowa

Area
  - Total: 0.75 sq mi (1.95 km^{2})
  - Land: 0.75 sq mi (1.95 km^{2})
  - Water: 0 sq mi (0.00 km^{2})
- Elevation: 1,371 ft (418 m)

Population (2020)
  - Total: 320
  - Density: 424.7/sq mi (163.98/km^{2})
- Time zone: UTC-6 (Central (CST))
  - Summer (DST): UTC-5 (CDT)
- ZIP code: 73559
- Area code: 580
- FIPS code: 40-49600
- GNIS feature ID: 2413020
- Website: mtnparkok.org

Mountain Park is a town in Kiowa County, Oklahoma, United States. The population was 320 as of the 2020 United States census.

== History ==
The town of Mountain Park began as a trading post named Burford, near the Wichita Mountains in southern Oklahoma Territory. A post office was established at Burford in August 1901, just after the Kiowa, Comanche, and Apache Reservation opened for settlement by non-Indians. In February 1902, the town that had sprung up around the trading post and changed its name to Mountain Park. Fires destroyed most of the wood-frame buildings along Main Street in 1906 and 1908. The town rebuilt with all brick structures.

According to Encyclopedia of Oklahoma History and Culture, the Oklahoma City and Western Railroad offered Mountain Park resident Sol Bracken six thousand dollars for a 160 acres (65 ha) tract on which to build a station. Bracken refused the offer as insufficient and demanded more money. Instead, company officials rerouted their railroad through the town of Snyder, two miles south of Mountain Park. As a result, 41 of the 47 businesses in Mountain Park promptly moved to Snyder.

By statehood in 1907, Mountain Park had 381 residents. In 1910, it was named the county seat of the short-lived Swanson County. That county was abolished in the following year. The local economy was based on cotton and wheat production, as well as granite quarrying. The population rose to 459 by 1930. Census population peaked at 557 in 1980.

On March 7, 2008, KSWO-TV reported that the former town clerk was fired for allegedly secretly embezzling $100,000 over a period of two years, leaving the town unable to pay its bills and forcing it to raise utility rates for residents.

== Geography ==
Mountain Park is located 28 miles (45 km) south of Hobart, 22 miles (35 km) east of Altus and 36 miles (58 km) west of Lawton.

According to the United States Census Bureau, the town has a total area of 0.8 square miles (2.1 km^{2}), all land.

== Demographics ==
Historical population
Census	Pop.	Note	%±
1910	449		—
1920	334		−25.6%
1930	459		37.4%
1940	441		−3.9%
1950	418		−5.2%
1960	403		−3.6%
1970	458		13.6%
1980	557		21.6%
1990	473		−15.1%
2000	390		−17.5%
2010	409		4.9%
2020	320		−21.8%
U.S. Decennial Census

=== 2020 census ===
As of the 2020 census, Mountain Park had a population of 320. The median age was 44.7 years. 21.9% of residents were under the age of 18 and 20.9% of residents were 65 years of age or older. For every 100 females there were 75.8 males, and for every 100 females age 18 and over there were 79.9 males age 18 and over.

0.0% of residents lived in urban areas, while 100.0% lived in rural areas.

There were 130 households in Mountain Park, of which 27.7% had children under the age of 18 living in them. Of all households, 46.9% were married-couple households, 17.7% were households with a male householder and no spouse or partner present, and 28.5% were households with a female householder and no spouse or partner present. About 30.8% of all households were made up of individuals and 18.5% had someone living alone who was 65 years of age or older.

There were 160 housing units, of which 18.8% were vacant. The homeowner vacancy rate was 1.0% and the rental vacancy rate was 15.2%.

Racial composition as of the 2020 census
Race	Number	Percent
White	256	80.0%
Black or African American	2	0.6%
American Indian and Alaska Native	7	2.2%
Asian	2	0.6%
Native Hawaiian and Other Pacific Islander	0	0.0%
Some other race	8	2.5%
Two or more races	45	14.1%
Hispanic or Latino (of any race)	41	12.8%

=== 2000 census ===
The median income for a household in the town was $17,031, and the median income for a family was $19,375. Males had a median income of $23,750 versus $25,625 for females. The per capita income for the town was $9,584. About 29.4% of families and 36.5% of the population were below the poverty line, including 54.6% of those under age 18 and 22.9% of those age 65 or over.

== Economy ==
Agriculture has supported the town's economy since its inception.
