= Kiowa County, Oklahoma =

County in Oklahoma, United States

- County
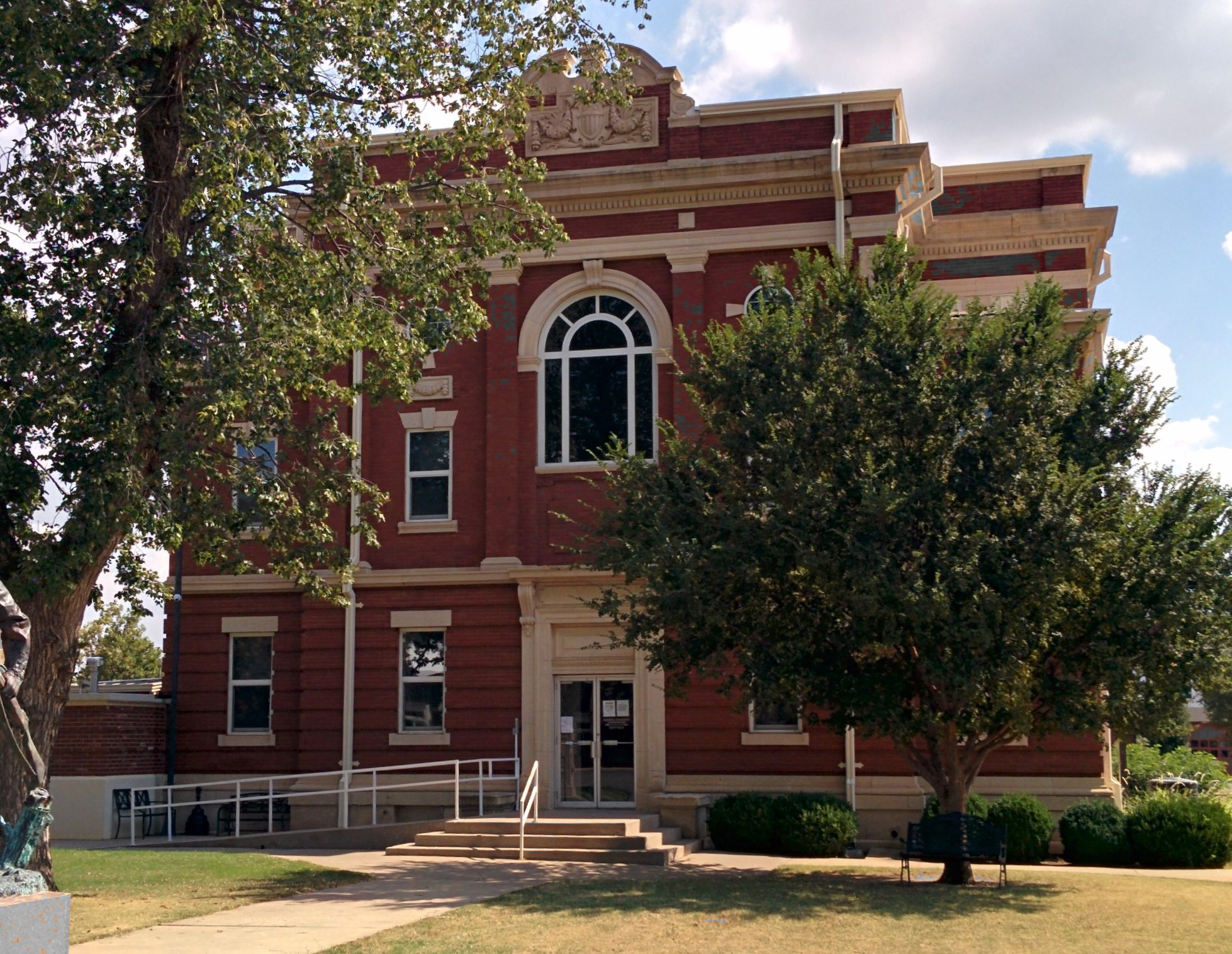
- Kiowa County Courthouse in Hobart

- Location within the U.S. state of Oklahoma
- Coordinates: 34°55′N 98°59′W
- Country: United States
- State: Oklahoma
- Founded: July 8, 1901
- Seat: Hobart
- Largest city: Hobart

Area
  - Total: 1,031 sq mi (2,670 km^{2})
  - Land: 1,015 sq mi (2,630 km^{2})
  - Water: 15 sq mi (39 km^{2}) 1.5%

Population (2020)
  - Total: 8,509
  - Estimate (2025): 8,181 ▼
  - Density: 9.3/sq mi (3.6/km^{2})
- Time zone: UTC−6 (Central)
  - Summer (DST): UTC−5 (CDT)
- Congressional district: 3rd
- Website: https://kiowacountyok.us/

Kiowa County is a county located in the southwestern part of the U.S. state of Oklahoma. As of the 2020 census, its population was 8,509. Its county seat is Hobart. The county was created in 1901 as part of Oklahoma Territory. It was named for the Kiowa people.

== History ==
In 1892, the Jerome Commission began enrolling the Kiowas, Comanches, and Apaches to prepare for the opening of their reservation to settlement by Whites. Dennis Flynn, the territorial representative to the U. S. Congress, proposed holding a lottery for opening the reservation. He argued successfully that the lottery would be safer and more orderly than land runs used earlier. Individuals could register at offices in Lawton or El Reno; 165,000 individuals registered for 13,000 160-acre claims. The drawing was held August 6, 1901. After the opening, the area was designated as Kiowa County in Oklahoma Territory. The town of Hobart, named for Vice President Garrett A. Hobart, was designated as county seat.

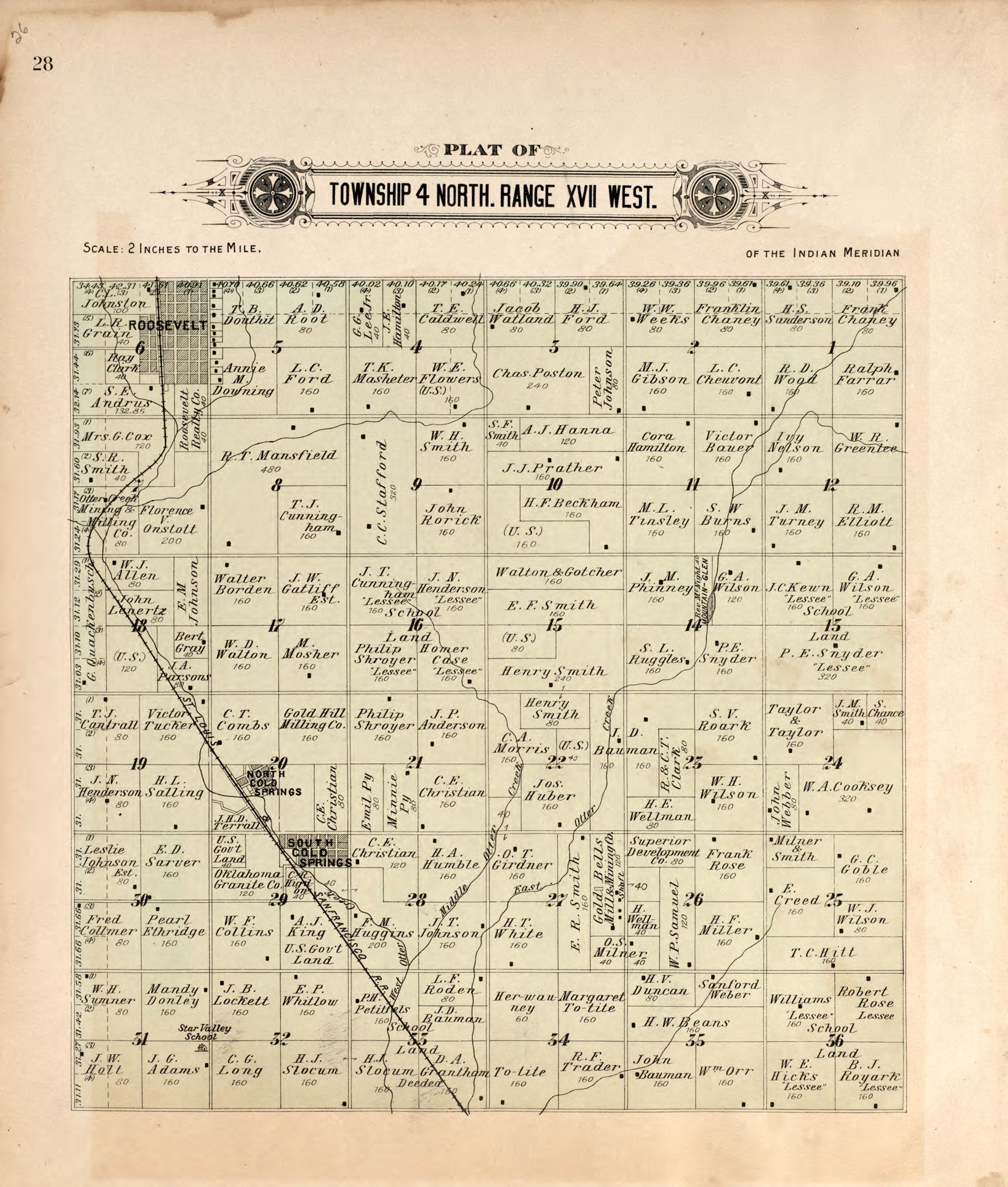
Plat book of Kiowa County, Oklahoma (1913)

By 1908, residents of the southern part of the county were already agitating for a new county to be formed. In 1910, Governor Charles N. Haskell proclaimed that parts of Kiowa and Comanche Counties would become the new Swanson County. The new county became defunct in 1911, after the Oklahoma Supreme Court voided the change. Ownerships of land parcels from 1913 are to be found in plat books.

== Geography ==
According to the U.S. Census Bureau, the county has a total area of 1,031 square miles (2,670 km^{2}), of which 15 square miles (39 km^{2}) (1.5%) are covered by water. The county is largely composed of flatlands, although the southern border is covered by the Washita Mountains.

The North Fork of the Red River serves as the southern and western boundaries with Jackson County. Water bodies include Lake Altus-Lugert, which impounds the North Fork of the Red River, and Tom Steed Reservoir on Otter Creek. Other water bodies in the county include the Washita River and Elk Creek.

=== Major highways ===
- U.S. Highway 62
- U.S. Highway 183
- State Highway 6
- State Highway 9
- State Highway 19
- State Highway 44
  - State Highway 44A
- State Highway 49
- State Highway 54
- State Highway 115

=== Adjacent counties ===
- Washita County (north)
- Caddo County (east)
- Comanche County (southeast)
- Tillman County (south)
- Jackson County (southwest)
- Greer County (west)

== Demographics ==
Historical population
Census	Pop.	Note	%±
1910	27,526		—
1920	23,094		−16.1%
1930	29,630		28.3%
1940	22,817		−23.0%
1950	18,926		−17.1%
1960	14,825		−21.7%
1970	12,532		−15.5%
1980	12,711		1.4%
1990	11,347		−10.7%
2000	10,227		−9.9%
2010	9,446		−7.6%
2020	8,509		−9.9%
2025 (est.)	8,181	▼	−3.9%
U.S. Decennial Census; 1790-1960 1900-1990; 1990-2000 2010

=== 2020 census ===
As of the 2020 census, the county had a population of 8,509. Of the residents, 23.7% were under the age of 18 and 21.9% were 65 years of age or older; the median age was 44.2 years. For every 100 females there were 96.1 males, and for every 100 females age 18 and over there were 93.8 males.

The racial makeup of the county was 76.6% White, 3.8% Black or African American, 6.6% American Indian and Alaska Native, 0.6% Asian, 3.7% from some other race, and 8.7% from two or more races. Hispanic or Latino residents of any race comprised 11.2% of the population.

There were 3,553 households in the county, of which 28.7% had children under the age of 18 living with them and 27.6% had a female householder with no spouse or partner present. About 31.4% of all households were made up of individuals and 15.6% had someone living alone who was 65 years of age or older.

There were 4,681 housing units, of which 24.1% were vacant. Among occupied housing units, 70.1% were owner-occupied and 29.9% were renter-occupied. The homeowner vacancy rate was 2.8% and the rental vacancy rate was 16.2%.

=== 2000 census ===
As of the census of 2000, 10,227 people, 4,208 households, and 2,815 families resided in the county. The population density was 10 people per square mile (3.9 people/km^{2}). The 5,304 housing units had an average density of 5 units per square mile (1.9/km^{2}). The racial makeup of the county was 83.54% White, 4.67% Black or African American, 6.31% Native American, 0.31% Asian, 0.06% Pacific Islander, 2.68% from other races, and 2.42% from two or more races. About 6.74% of the population were Hispanics or Latinos of any race.

Of the 4,208 households, 27.9% had children under 18 living with them, 52.0% were married couples living together, 10.4% had a female householder with no husband present, and 33.1% were not families. About 30.6% of all households were made up of individuals, and 16.3% had someone living alone who was 65 or older. The average household size was 2.35 and the average family size was 2.92.

In the county, the age distribution was 24.2% under 18, 7.5% from 18 to 24, 24.5% from 25 to 44, 23.4% from 45 to 64, and 20.3% who were 65 or older. The median age was 41 years. For every 100 females, there were 95.70 males. For every 100 females 18 and over, there were 90.7 males.

The median income for a household in the county was $26,053, and for a family was $34,654. Males had a median income of $25,552 versus $19,497 for females. The per capita income for the county was $14,231. About 15.0% of families and 19.3% of the population were below the poverty line, including 23.3% of those under 18 and 15.7% of those 65 or over.

== Politics ==
Voter Registration and Party Enrollment as of June 30, 2023
Party	Number of voters	Percentage
Democratic	1,493	31.51%
Republican	2,622	55.30%
Others	626	13.20%
Total	4,741	100%

=== Political culture ===
United States presidential election results for Kiowa County, Oklahoma
Year	Republican		Democratic		Third party(ies)	
Year	No.	%	No.	%	No.	%
1908	1,591	37.30%	2,354	55.19%	320	7.50%
1912	1,167	29.55%	1,831	46.37%	951	24.08%
1916	1,017	22.98%	2,279	51.49%	1,130	25.53%
1920	2,649	47.22%	2,518	44.88%	443	7.90%
1924	1,688	34.78%	2,635	54.29%	531	10.94%
1928	4,116	63.54%	2,270	35.04%	92	1.42%
1932	966	15.66%	5,204	84.34%	0	0.00%
1936	1,684	22.88%	5,624	76.40%	53	0.72%
1940	2,539	35.01%	4,679	64.52%	34	0.47%
1944	2,081	33.14%	4,175	66.48%	24	0.38%
1948	1,530	26.41%	4,263	73.59%	0	0.00%
1952	4,100	54.03%	3,489	45.97%	0	0.00%
1956	2,713	44.59%	3,371	55.41%	0	0.00%
1960	3,515	57.13%	2,638	42.87%	0	0.00%
1964	2,206	37.44%	3,686	62.56%	0	0.00%
1968	2,418	43.22%	2,219	39.67%	957	17.11%
1972	3,711	69.81%	1,495	28.12%	110	2.07%
1976	1,971	36.37%	3,403	62.79%	46	0.85%
1980	2,636	51.44%	2,372	46.29%	116	2.26%
1984	2,951	59.08%	2,016	40.36%	28	0.56%
1988	2,030	46.58%	2,296	52.68%	32	0.73%
1992	1,635	33.30%	2,143	43.65%	1,132	23.05%
1996	1,638	39.68%	1,973	47.80%	517	12.52%
2000	2,173	57.95%	1,544	41.17%	33	0.88%
2004	2,610	64.88%	1,413	35.12%	0	0.00%
2008	2,537	67.42%	1,226	32.58%	0	0.00%
2012	2,316	67.68%	1,106	32.32%	0	0.00%
2016	2,596	74.32%	767	21.96%	130	3.72%
2020	2,673	78.00%	699	20.40%	55	1.60%
2024	2,569	78.37%	658	20.07%	51	1.56%

== Communities ==
=== Cities ===
- Hobart (county seat)
- Snyder

=== Towns ===
- Cooperton
- Gotebo
- Lone Wolf
- Mountain Park
- Mountain View
- Roosevelt

=== Unincorporated communities ===
- Babbs
- Cambridge
- Lugert
- Saddle Mountain

== Notable people ==
- Tommy Franks (1945- ), U. S. Army general (retired) and commander of U. S. Central Command during the Iraq War; lives in Roosevelt, Oklahoma, since his army retirement.
- Dale Meinert (1933-2004), an All-Pro linebacker for the St. Louis Cardinals, was born at Lone Wolf.
- N. Scott Momaday (1934-2024), 1969 Pulitzer Prize winner for House Made of Dawn, is from Mountain View.
- Angela R. Riley, chief justice of Citizen Potawatomi Nation (2010–present)
- Col. Jack Treadwell (1919-1977) of Snyder, who served in the 180th Infantry, Forty-fifth Infantry Division, during World War II, received the Congressional Medal of Honor.
- Lt. Gen. La Vern E. Weber (1923-2004), born at Lone Wolf, served as chief of the National Guard Bureau.

== See also ==
- National Register of Historic Places listings in Kiowa County, Oklahoma
- Zodletone Mountain
