= Hobart, Oklahoma =

- City
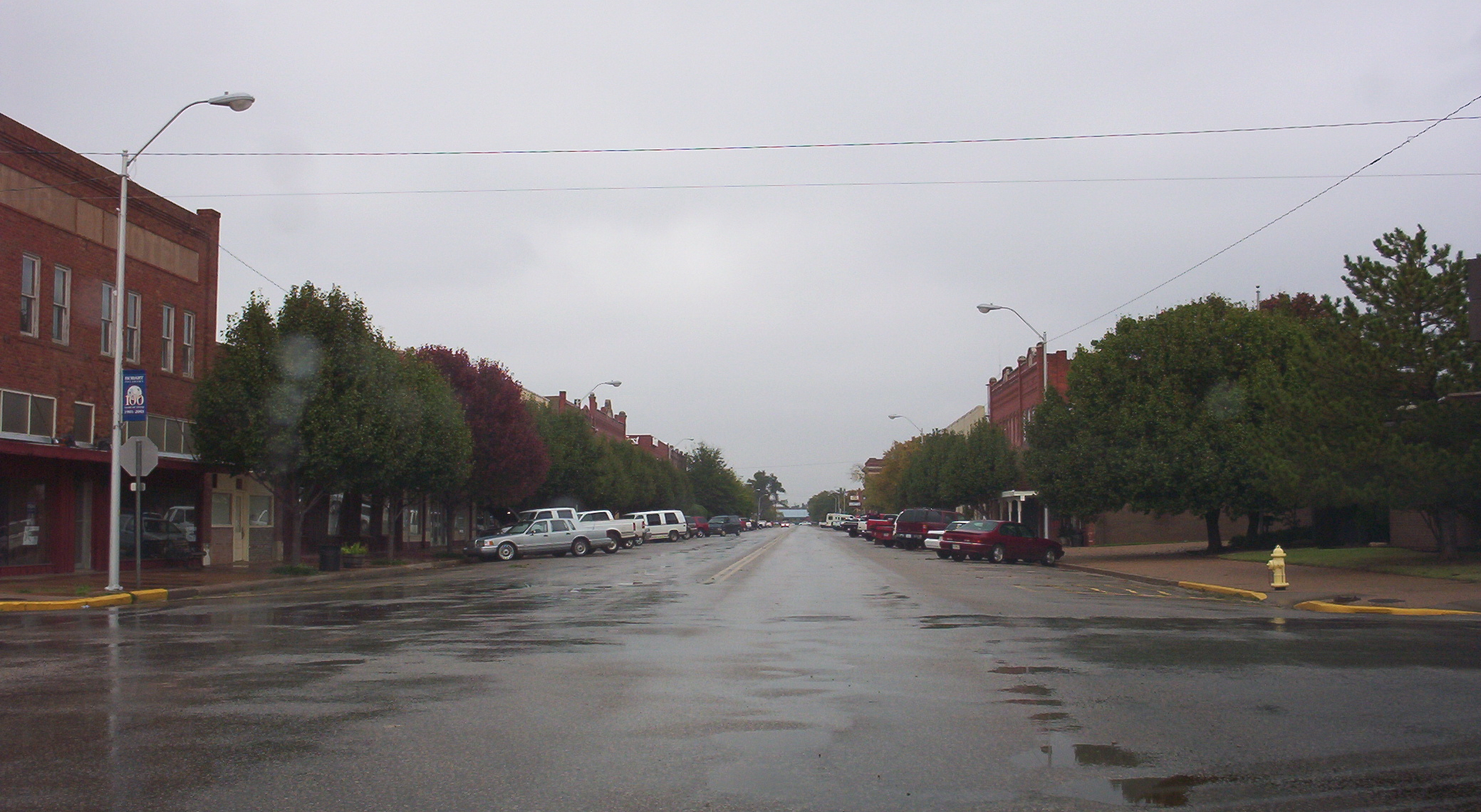
- Main Street of Hobart, 2004
- Motto(s): "Hobart is not just a town, It's a Community."
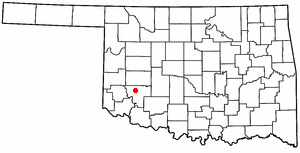
- Location of Hobart, Oklahoma
- Coordinates: 35°01′28″N 99°05′15″W
- Country: United States
- State: Oklahoma
- County: Kiowa

Area
  - Total: 3.36 sq mi (8.71 km^{2})
  - Land: 3.36 sq mi (8.71 km^{2})
  - Water: 0 sq mi (0.00 km^{2})
- Elevation: 1,542 ft (470 m)

Population (2020)
  - Total: 3,413
  - Density: 1,015.0/sq mi (391.91/km^{2})
- Time zone: UTC-6 (Central (CST))
  - Summer (DST): UTC-5 (CDT)
- ZIP code: 73651
- Area code: 580
- FIPS code: 40-35000
- GNIS feature ID: 2410770
- Website: hobartok.gov

Hobart is a city in and the county seat of Kiowa County, Oklahoma, United States. It is west-southwest of Oklahoma City, and northwest of Lawton. It was named for Garret Hobart, the 24th Vice President of the United States. Its population was 3,413 at the 2020 Census. It is served by Hobart Regional Airport. It also has two museums: General Tommy Franks Museum and Kiowa County Museum.

== History ==
The present town of Hobart began almost overnight on August 6, 1901, when lots on the former Kiowa-Apache-Comanche Reservation in southern Oklahoma Territory were put up for sale. It quickly became the residence of 2,936 people, mostly living in tents. Initially, the town was nicknamed "Ragtown". Wooden structures replaced tents as fast as possible. By 1903, Hobart had electric lights, an ice plant, and some large wholesale businesses. It also had a wooden courthouse. It developed into a town whose economy was based on the production of cotton. At statehood in November 1907, Hobart had a population of 3,136.

Hobart's population declined to 2,936 in 1920, but resumed growing for several years afterward. In 1930, its population was 4,982. In 1950, it reached a peak of 5,380. Thereafter, the town population went into a long-term decline that has continued to the present. In 1950, the water supply in the area was improved with a series of reservoirs; the town is connected by aqueduct to Lake Hobart, about 12 mi to the north.

== Geography ==
Hobart is located 120 miles (190 km) southwest of Oklahoma City and 65 miles (105 km) northwest of Lawton

According to the United States Census Bureau, the city has a total area of 2.7 square miles (7.0 km^{2}), all land.

== Economy ==
The economy of the area around Hobart was first based on farming, with the major crops being wheat and cotton. Cattle ranching became important later. Hobart is still primarily a farm town. By the 21st century, most of the employed townspeople worked in the education, health, and social services industries.

== Climate ==
Climate data for Hobart, Oklahoma (Hobart Regional Airport), 1991–2020 normals, records 1910–present
Month	Jan	Feb	Mar	Apr	May	Jun	Jul	Aug	Sep	Oct	Nov	Dec	Year
Record high °F (°C)	88 (31)	93 (34)	96 (36)	102 (39)	108 (42)	116 (47)	117 (47)	116 (47)	110 (43)	102 (39)	92 (33)	86 (30)	117 (47)
Mean maximum °F (°C)	72.2 (22.3)	77.6 (25.3)	84.7 (29.3)	89.6 (32.0)	97.3 (36.3)	102.1 (38.9)	106.3 (41.3)	104.6 (40.3)	99.4 (37.4)	91.7 (33.2)	80.3 (26.8)	71.9 (22.2)	107.3 (41.8)
Mean daily maximum °F (°C)	50.8 (10.4)	55.2 (12.9)	64.1 (17.8)	72.7 (22.6)	82.3 (27.9)	92.0 (33.3)	96.8 (36.0)	95.4 (35.2)	86.7 (30.4)	74.8 (23.8)	61.6 (16.4)	51.6 (10.9)	73.7 (23.2)
Daily mean °F (°C)	39.4 (4.1)	43.4 (6.3)	51.9 (11.1)	60.1 (15.6)	70.4 (21.3)	80.2 (26.8)	84.7 (29.3)	83.4 (28.6)	75.1 (23.9)	62.9 (17.2)	50.2 (10.1)	40.9 (4.9)	61.9 (16.6)
Mean daily minimum °F (°C)	28.1 (−2.2)	31.6 (−0.2)	39.8 (4.3)	47.6 (8.7)	58.4 (14.7)	68.3 (20.2)	72.6 (22.6)	71.4 (21.9)	63.5 (17.5)	51.0 (10.6)	38.8 (3.8)	30.2 (−1.0)	50.1 (10.1)
Mean minimum °F (°C)	12.4 (−10.9)	15.5 (−9.2)	20.5 (−6.4)	30.1 (−1.1)	41.4 (5.2)	56.3 (13.5)	62.5 (16.9)	60.7 (15.9)	47.7 (8.7)	31.9 (−0.1)	20.5 (−6.4)	13.9 (−10.1)	7.3 (−13.7)
Record low °F (°C)	−10 (−23)	−9 (−23)	2 (−17)	19 (−7)	29 (−2)	43 (6)	52 (11)	46 (8)	31 (−1)	14 (−10)	9 (−13)	−9 (−23)	−10 (−23)
Average precipitation inches (mm)	0.67 (17)	0.98 (25)	1.85 (47)	2.94 (75)	4.15 (105)	3.35 (85)	2.72 (69)	2.76 (70)	2.90 (74)	2.85 (72)	1.52 (39)	1.30 (33)	27.99 (711)
Average snowfall inches (cm)	2.3 (5.8)	1.4 (3.6)	0.3 (0.76)	0.0 (0.0)	0.0 (0.0)	0.0 (0.0)	0.0 (0.0)	0.0 (0.0)	0.0 (0.0)	0.0 (0.0)	0.2 (0.51)	1.3 (3.3)	5.5 (13.97)
Average precipitation days (≥ 0.01 in)	3.9	4.2	6.5	6.5	9.6	7.6	6.4	5.9	6.5	6.2	4.9	4.4	72.6
Average snowy days (≥ 0.1 in)	1.0	0.7	0.3	0.0	0.0	0.0	0.0	0.0	0.0	0.0	0.1	1.2	3.3
Source 1: NOAA (snow/snow days 1981–2010)
Source 2: National Weather Service

== Demographics ==
Historical population
Census	Pop.	Note	%±
1910	3,845		—
1920	2,936		−23.6%
1930	4,982		69.7%
1940	5,380		8.0%
1950	5,132		−4.6%
1960	5,132		0.0%
1970	4,638		−9.6%
1980	4,735		2.1%
1990	4,305		−9.1%
2000	3,997		−7.2%
2010	3,756		−6.0%
2020	3,413		−9.1%
U.S. Decennial Census

=== 2020 census ===
As of the 2020 census, Hobart had a population of 3,413. The median age was 41.2 years. 24.9% of residents were under the age of 18 and 19.8% of residents were 65 years of age or older. For every 100 females there were 90.7 males, and for every 100 females age 18 and over there were 87.7 males age 18 and over.

0% of residents lived in urban areas, while 100.0% lived in rural areas.

There were 1,431 households in Hobart, of which 29.1% had children under the age of 18 living in them. Of all households, 40.0% were married-couple households, 20.7% were households with a male householder and no spouse or partner present, and 32.1% were households with a female householder and no spouse or partner present. About 34.4% of all households were made up of individuals and 16.7% had someone living alone who was 65 years of age or older.

There were 1,903 housing units, of which 24.8% were vacant. Among occupied housing units, 60.4% were owner-occupied and 39.6% were renter-occupied. The homeowner vacancy rate was 3.7% and the rental vacancy rate was 17.9%.

Racial composition as of the 2020 census
Race	Percent
White	71.0%
Black or African American	6.8%
American Indian and Alaska Native	5.7%
Asian	0.9%
Native Hawaiian and Other Pacific Islander	<0.1%
Some other race	5.7%
Two or more races	10.0%
Hispanic or Latino (of any race)	14.9%

=== 2000 census ===
As of the 2000 census of 2000, 3,997 people, 1,584 households, and 1,031 families were residing in the city. The population density was 1,472.9 inhabitants per square mile (568.7/km^{2}). The 1,979 housing units had an average density of 729.3 per square mile (281.6/km^{2}). The racial makeup of the city was 80.01% White, 8.18% African American, 4.38% Native American, 0.60% Asian, 0.10% Pacific Islander, 3.83% from other races, and 2.90% from two or more races. Hispanics or Latinos of any race were 8.91% of the population.

Of the 1,584 households, 29.3% had children under 18 living with them, 49.1% were married couples living together, 11.8% had a female householder with no spouse present, and 34.9% were not families. About 32.4% of all households were made up of individuals, and 17.7% had someone living alone who was 65 or older. The average household size was 2.37 and the average family size was 2.99.

In the city, the age distribution was 25.0% under 18, 8.0% from 18 to 24, 25.7% from 25 to 44, 20.8% from 45 to 64, and 20.4% who were 65 or older. The median age was 39 years. For every 100 females, there were 95.2 males. For every 100 females 18 and over, there were 89.4 males.

The median income for a household in the city was $25,781, and for a family was $35,313. Males had a median income of $24,821 versus $20,345 for females. The per capita income for the city was $13,729. About 16.4% of families and 20.0% of the population were below the poverty line, including 23.2% of those under age 18 and 15.2% of those age 65 or over.

== Historical sites ==
Five of the eight NRHP-listed sites in Kiowa County are located in Hobart:

- Downtown Hobart Historic District (roughly bounded by Jefferson St., 3rd, Washington, 4th, and the 200 and 500 blocks of S. Main St.)
- Hobart City Hall at Main and 3rd St.
- Kiowa County Courthouse (in Courthouse Square)
- Hobart Public Library (200 S. Main St.)
- Hobart Rock Island Depot (518 S. Main St.)

== Media ==
FM radio

Frequency (MHz)	Call Sign	kW
105.9	KQTZ	100

Distant FM radio

Frequency (MHz)	Call sign	kW
93.5	KPRO	45
106.9	KTJI	100
103.5	KVSP	100

Newspaper The Hobart Democrat-Chief is Hobart's oldest business, established August 1, 1901, and was still in operation in 2025. The town has had two other newspapers, the Hobart Daily Chief and the Hobart Republican.

== Notable people ==
- Catharine Crozier, a concert organist, was born in Hobart in 1914.
- Clint Lorance, an Army officer convicted of second-degree murder for battlefield deaths, and subsequently pardoned, was born in Hobart.
- Jeanetta Calhoun Mish, Oklahoma poet laureate, was born in Hobart.
- Alfred P. Slaner, a textile executive, was raised in Hobart.
- James Barnes (composer), a composer and tubist, was born in Hobart in 1949.
