= Spring Creek =

A spring creek is a stream that flows from a spring.

Spring Creek may refer to:

== Australia ==
- Spring Creek, Queensland (Banana Shire)
- Spring Creek, Queensland (Darling Downs), a locality split between Toowoomba Region and Southern Downs Region in southeastern Queensland
- Spring Creek, Queensland (Lockyer Valley Region)
- Spring Creek, former name of Graytown, Victoria

== Canada ==
- Spring Creek (Lake Erie), a watershed administered by the Long Point Region Conservation Authority, that drains into Lake Erie
- Spring Creek (Grenadier Pond), a tributary to Grenadier Pond, see Wendigo Creek
- Spring Creek (Ontario), headwaters for Heart Lake (Ontario)

== New Zealand ==
- Spring Creek, New Zealand, a township near Blenheim, New Zealand

== United States ==
=== Settlements ===
- Spring Creek, Minnesota, an unincorporated community
- Spring Creek Township, Becker County, Minnesota
- Spring Creek Township, Norman County, Minnesota
- Spring Creek, Missouri, a ghost town
- Spring Creek Township, Custer County, Nebraska
- Spring Creek, Nevada, a census-designated place
- Spring Creek, Brooklyn, New York
- Spring Creek, North Carolina, in Madison County, NC
- Spring Creek, Oklahoma, an unincorporated community
- Spring Creek Township, Elk County, Pennsylvania
- Spring Creek Township, Warren County, Pennsylvania
- Spring Creek, South Dakota, a census-designated place
- Spring Creek, West Virginia, an unincorporated community

=== Waterways ===
==== California ====
- Spring Creek (Sonoma County, California)
- Spring Creek (Shasta County, California), a main tributary of the Fall River
- Spring Creek (San Mateo County, California), a tributary of Laguna Creek in San Mateo County

==== Colorado ====
- Spring Creek (Fort Collins, Colorado), a tributary of the Cache La Poudre River

==== Delaware ====
- Spring Creek (Murderkill River tributary), in Kent County

==== Georgia ====
- Spring Creek (Flint River tributary)

==== Illinois ====
- Spring Creek (Macon County, Illinois), a tributary of Stevens Creek
- Spring Creek (Sangamon County, Illinois), a tributary of the Sangamon River

==== Minnesota ====
- Spring Creek (Minnesota), a headwater to the Yellow Medicine River

==== Missouri ====
- Spring Creek (Big Piney River tributary) in Texas and Phelps counties
- Spring Creek (Bourbeuse River tributary)
- Spring Creek (Bryant Creek tributary), in Douglas and Ozark counties
- Spring Creek (Chariton River tributary), in Putnam, Sullivan and Adair counties
- Spring Creek (Dent County, Missouri)
- Spring Creek (Eleven Point River tributary)
- Spring Creek (Gasconade River tributary)
- Spring Creek (North Fork River tributary), in Douglas and Howell counties
- Spring Creek (Shoal Creek tributary)
- Spring Creek (Stoddard County, Missouri)

==== Montana ====
- Big Spring Creek, Fergus County
- Spring Creek, Teton County
- Spring Creek, Lewis and Clark County

==== Nebraska ====
- Spring Creek (Redbird Creek tributary), Holt County
- Spring Creek (Brush Creek tributary), Holt County

==== Nevada ====
- Spring Creek (West Deep Creek tributary)

==== North Carolina ====
- Spring Creek (Madison County, North Carolina)

==== North Dakota ====
- Spring Creek (North Dakota), a tributary of the Knife River

==== Ohio ====
- Spring Creek (Great Miami River tributary)

==== Oklahoma ====
- Spring Creek (Beaver River Tributary)
- Spring Creek (Neosho River Tributary)
- Spring Creek in Caddo County, Oklahoma, impounded for Chickasha Lake and a tributary of the Washita River
- Spring Creek in Roger Mills County, Oklahoma, impounded for Spring Creek Lake (Oklahoma) and a tributary of the Washita River
- Spring Creek in Washita County, Oklahoma, a tributary of Cobb Creek

==== Pennsylvania ====
- Spring Creek (Bald Eagle Creek tributary), in Centre County
- Spring Creek (Clarion River), a tributary of the Clarion River in Elk County
- Spring Creek (Little Lehigh Creek tributary)
- Spring Creek (Susquehanna River tributary)
- Spring Creek (Tulpehocken Creek), a tributary of Tulpehocken Creek (Pennsylvania) in Berks County
- Spring Creek (White Deer Hole Creek tributary), in Lycoming County and Union County
- Spring Creek (Brokenstraw Creek tributary), in Warren County

==== Tennessee ====
- Spring Creek (Roaring River tributary), in Putnam, Overton and Jackson counties

==== Texas ====
- Spring Creek (Harris County, Texas), terminates in Lake Houston in Harris County
- Spring Creek (Victoria County, Texas)
- Spring Creek (South Concho River), an inflow of the Twin Buttes Reservoir in Tom Green, Irion, and Crockett counties
- Spring Creek (Collin County, Texas)

==== West Virginia ====
- Spring Creek (Little Kanawha River tributary)

==== Wisconsin ====
- Spring Creek (Waupaca River tributary)

== See also ==
- Spring Creek Correctional Center, state prison in Seward, Alaska
- Spring Creek Dam, Shasta County, California
- Spring Creek Forest Preserve, Garland, Texas
- Spring Creek Hatchery State Park, Skamania County, Washington
- Spring Creek Lake (disambiguation)
- Spring Creek Park, New York City
- Spring Creek Township (disambiguation)
- Starrett City (formally Spring Creek Towers), Brooklyn, New York
