= Oklahoma State Highway 73 =

State highway in Oklahoma, United States

State Highway 73

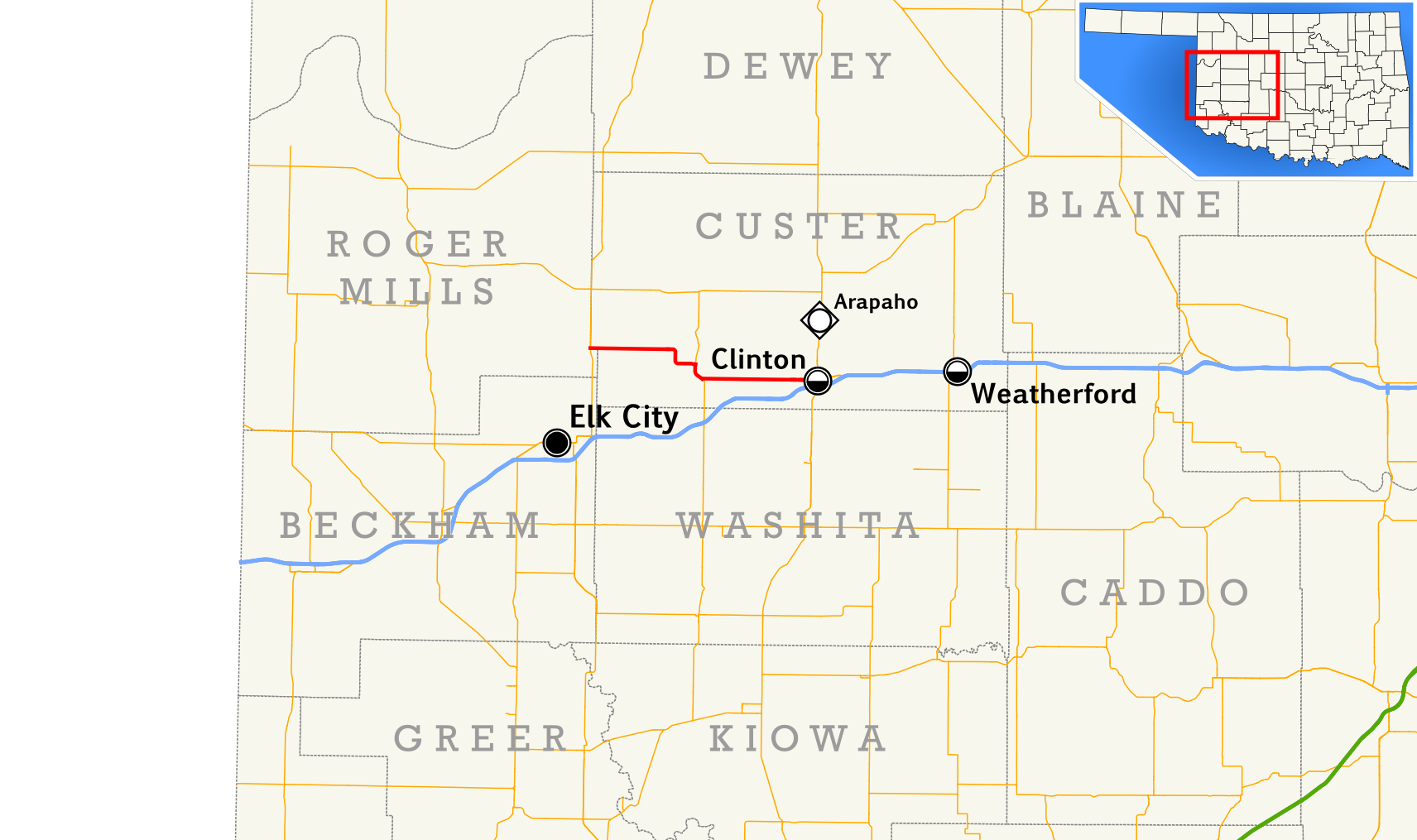

Route information
- Maintained by ODOT
- Length: 24.5 mi (39.4 km)

Major junctions
- West end: SH-34 north of Elk City
- East end: I-40 BL in Clinton

Location
- Country: United States
- State: Oklahoma

Highway system
- Oklahoma State Highway System; Interstate; US; State; Turnpikes
← SH-72	→ SH-74

State Highway 73 (abbreviated SH-73 or OK-73) is a 24½ mi (39.4 km) state highway mostly in Custer Co., Oklahoma, although a stretch of about four-fifths of a mile (1.3 km) of its eastbound lane lies in Roger Mills Co. SH-73 has no lettered spur routes.

== Route description ==
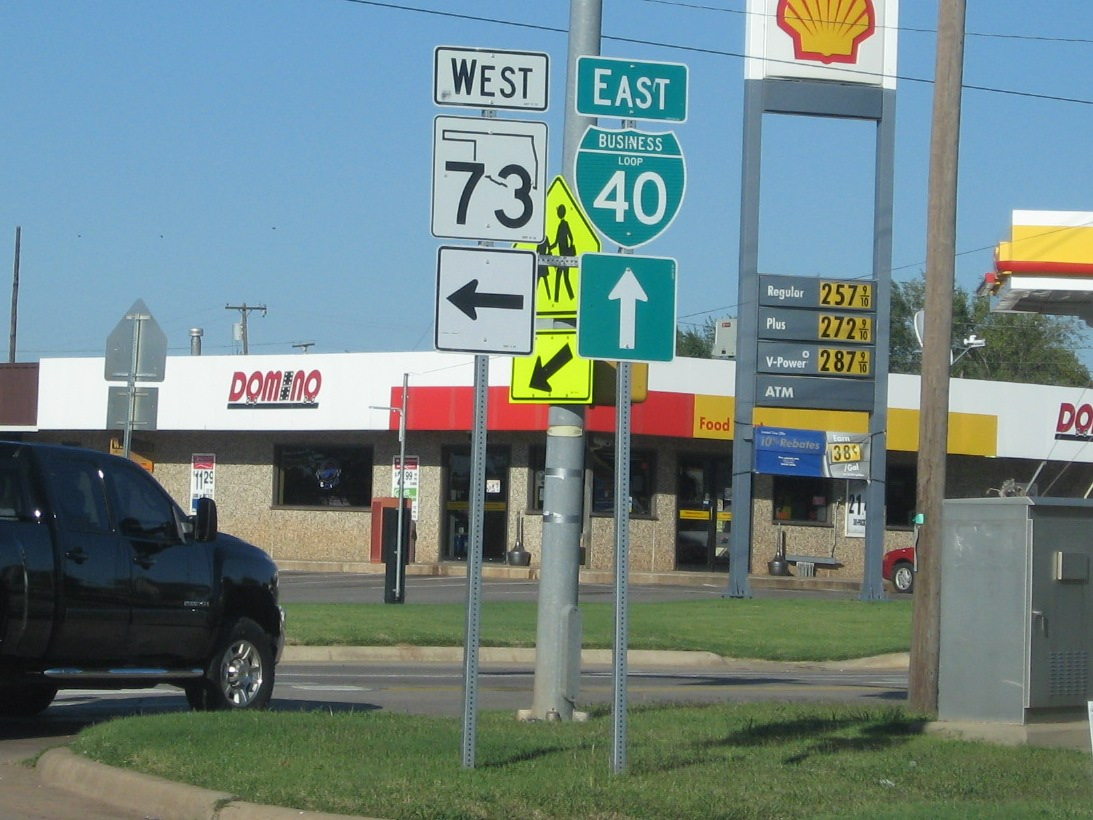
SH-73's eastern terminus as viewed from I-40 BUS in Clinton.

State Highway 73 begins at State Highway 34 south of Hammon. The western terminus of the highway occurs at a jog in the Roger Mills–Custer county line; north of the intersection, SH-34 runs along the north–south boundary, and at the intersection, the boundary makes a ninety-degree turn to head east–west. The first 0.8 miles (1.3 km) of SH-73 straddles the county line. The county line makes another turn after this to return to a north–south orientation, and SH-73 fully enters Custer County.

In Custer County, SH-73 travels through hilly terrain and crosses both Panther Creek and Little Panther Creek, tributaries of Foss Lake. SH-73 serves the southwestern portion of the lake, and runs along the edges of Foss State Park. The highway provides connections to four campgrounds along the lakeshore. Near the southeast corner of the lake, the route intersects SH-44.

SH-73 turns south along SH-44, forming a concurrency. The two routes curve southwest to cross Oak Creek. SH-44/73 travel together for 2 miles (3.2 km) before SH-73 splits off, returning to a due east course. The highway parallels I-40, which runs to the south of SH-73. SH-73 then bridges the Washita River. West of Clinton, the highway crosses a set of railroad tracks at the unincorporated locale of Ralph. State Highway 73 then enters Clinton, where it comes to an end at an intersection with I-40's Clinton business loop.

== Junction list ==
County	Location	mi	km	Destinations	Notes
Roger Mills–Custer county line		0.0	0.0	SH-34 – Elk City, Hammon	Western terminus; motorists making westbound SH-73 to northbound SH-34 movements will remain within Custer County
Custer		12.1	19.5	SH-44 north – Butler	Northern end of SH-44 concurrency
Custer		13.9	22.4	SH-44 south – Foss	Southern end of SH-44 concurrency
Custer	Clinton	24.5	39.4	I-40 BL (W. Gary Boulevard)	Eastern terminus
1.000 mi = 1.609 km; 1.000 km = 0.621 mi: Concurrency terminus
