= Washita Basin Project =

The Washita Basin Project is a Bureau of Reclamation water management initiative in the U.S. state of Oklahoma. Authorized in 1956, the project was designed to provide a dependable municipal and industrial water supply for communities in western Oklahoma, while also offering flood control, recreation, and wildlife habitat benefits. Its principal features include Foss Reservoir and Fort Cobb Reservoir, which together supply water to approximately 40,000 people and support regional economic development.

== History ==
The Washita River Basin, spanning about 8,000 square miles in western Oklahoma, has long been prone to extreme climatic variability, including severe droughts and catastrophic floods. These conditions were highlighted by the Dust Bowl of the 1930s and the April 1934 Hammon Flood, which killed 17 people and devastated farmland in Roger Mills County. Early reconnaissance studies by the Bureau of Reclamation began as early as 1902, but comprehensive investigations were launched in 1945 to address chronic water shortages and flood risks.

Surveys conducted in 1946 and 1951 revealed that most towns in the basin relied on inadequate groundwater sources or small tributary reservoirs, leaving them vulnerable during drought periods. In response, Congress authorized the Washita Basin Project on February 25, 1956 under Public Law 419, 84th Congress (70 Stat. 28). The legislation directed construction of Foss Reservoir and Fort Cobb Reservoir, associated aqueducts, and recreational facilities.

Construction began in 1958. Fort Cobb Dam was completed in 1959, creating Fort Cobb Reservoir on Cobb Creek, a tributary of the Washita River. Foss Dam followed in 1961, forming Foss Reservoir on the main stem of the Washita River. Aqueduct systems were built to deliver water to municipalities: the Anadarko Aqueduct (1958–1961) and the Foss Aqueduct (1960–1962). These facilities not only secured municipal and industrial water supplies but also provided flood control, irrigation, and recreational opportunities.

The project also played a role in wildlife conservation. In 1961, the Washita National Wildlife Refuge was established on Foss Reservoir to protect migratory waterfowl and create habitat for diverse species. Today, the reservoirs provide over 12,800 acres of combined land and water for recreation and wildlife management.

In recent decades, the Washita Basin Project has faced challenges from prolonged droughts, including the record-breaking 2011 drought. Studies using tree-ring data have shown that future “paleo-droughts” could significantly reduce reservoir yields, prompting the Bureau of Reclamation to implement adaptive management strategies.

== Facilities ==
- Foss Reservoir - Provides municipal water, flood control, recreation, and wildlife habitat; home to Washita National Wildlife Refuge.
- Fort Cobb Reservoir - Supplies water via the Anadarko Aqueduct; offers extensive recreational and wildlife management areas
