= Spring Creek (Beaver River Tributary) =

Seneca Creek

Location
- Country: United States

Physical characteristics
- Source
  - location: Oklahoma
- Mouth
  - location: Oklahoma

Spring Creek is a tributary of the Beaver River in Harper County, Oklahoma, south of Laverne. It is formed by the joinder of two other streams, known as the North Fork Spring Creek and the South Fork Spring Creek. Both the North Fork and the South Fork originate southwest of Laverne, just inside Beaver County. The North Fork heads northeasterly over the western Harper County line, whereas the South Fork heads east over the western border of Ellis County before taking a more north-northwesterly direction and crossing over the southern border of Harper County. The forks meet south-southwest of Laverne and just north of US-412/US-270. Spring Creek then travels generally northeast. Maps typically show the creek terminating southeast of Laverne short of reaching the Beaver, but the watershed extends all the way to the river.

The Tulsa World has reported that Oklahoma has at least six watercourses that are called Spring Creek. This Spring Creek is not to be confused with others including the Spring Creek that originates in Eastern Oklahoma and empties into Fort Gibson Lake, the Spring Creek in Roger Mills County in Western Oklahoma which feeds Spring Creek Lake, the Spring Creek that fills Lake Chickasha in Caddo County, Oklahoma, the Spring Creek that is a tributary of Cobb Creek in Washita County, or with numerous other watercourses named Spring Creek in other locations.

== See also ==
- List of rivers of Oklahoma
