= KCLI =

KCLI may refer to:

- KCLI (AM), a radio station (1320 AM) licensed to Clinton, Oklahoma, United States.
- KCLI-FM, a radio station (99.3 FM) licensed to Cordell, Oklahoma, United States.
