= Oklahoma State Highway 44 =

Highway in Oklahoma

State Highway 44

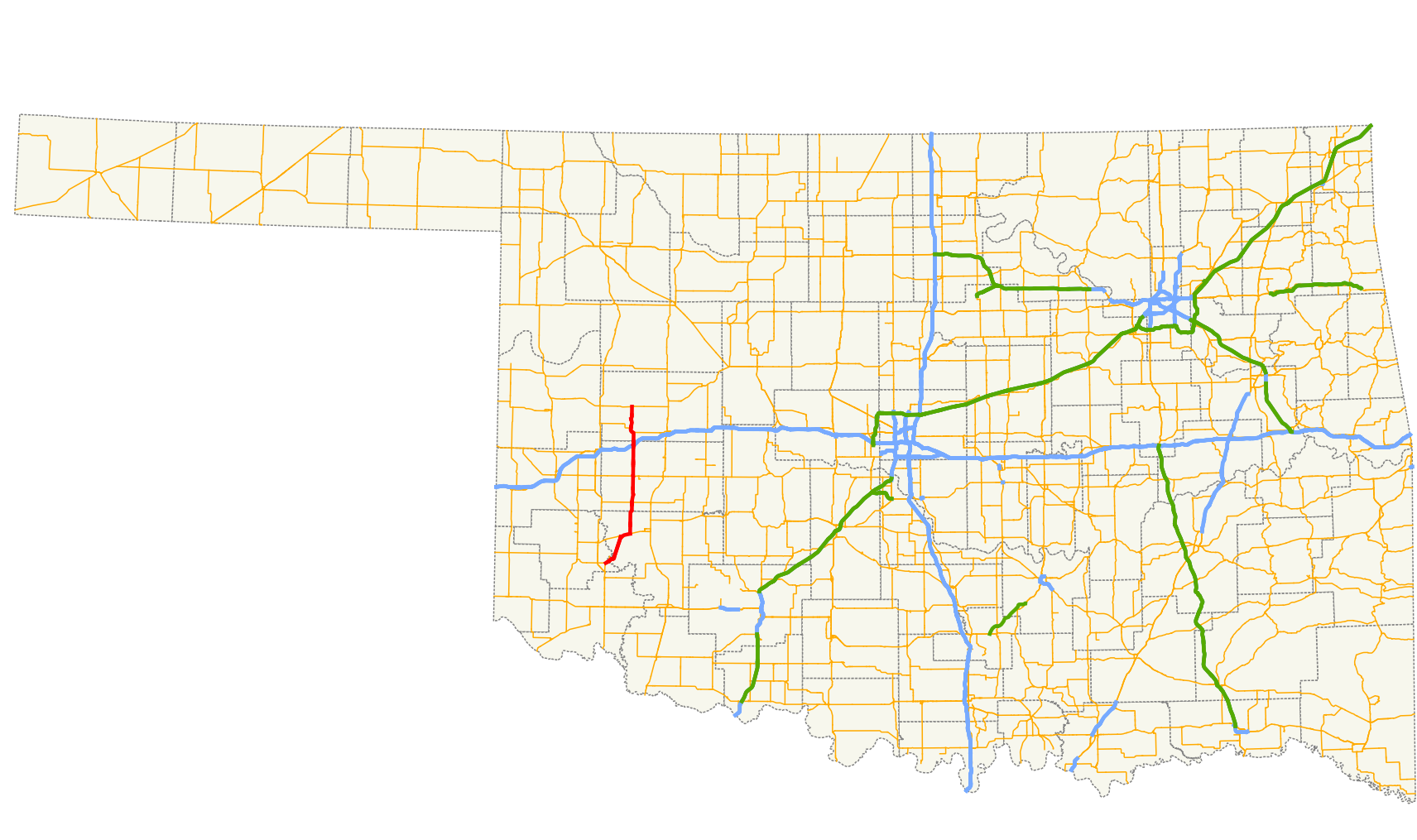

Route information
- Maintained by ODOT
- Length: 59.2 mi (95.3 km)
- Existed: April 14, 1932–present

Major junctions
- South end: Great Plains Trail of Oklahoma north of Blair
- SH-9 in Lone Wolf; I-40 in Foss
- North end: SH-33 in Butler

Location
- Country: United States
- State: Oklahoma

Highway system
- Oklahoma State Highway System; Interstate; US; State; Turnpikes
← I-44	→ SH-45

State Highway 44 (abbreviated SH-44) is a state highway in the western portion of the U.S. state of Oklahoma. It runs for 59.2 miles (95.3 km), beginning north of Blair in Greer County, and proceeding north to Butler in Custer County. It is not to be confused with Interstate 44. The highway has one lettered spur route, SH-44A.

SH-44 was established on April 14, 1932. Initially, the route consisted of three disconnected segments of highway; the southern segment corresponded with present-day SH-6 southwest of Altus, the central segment extended from the current southern terminus of the route to what is now known as Dill City, and the northern segment began west of Custer City and extended north to Medford. The northernmost section was redesignated as several other highways, primarily SH-58. The other two segments of highway were connected in 1962, and the current termini were established in 1987.

== Route description ==
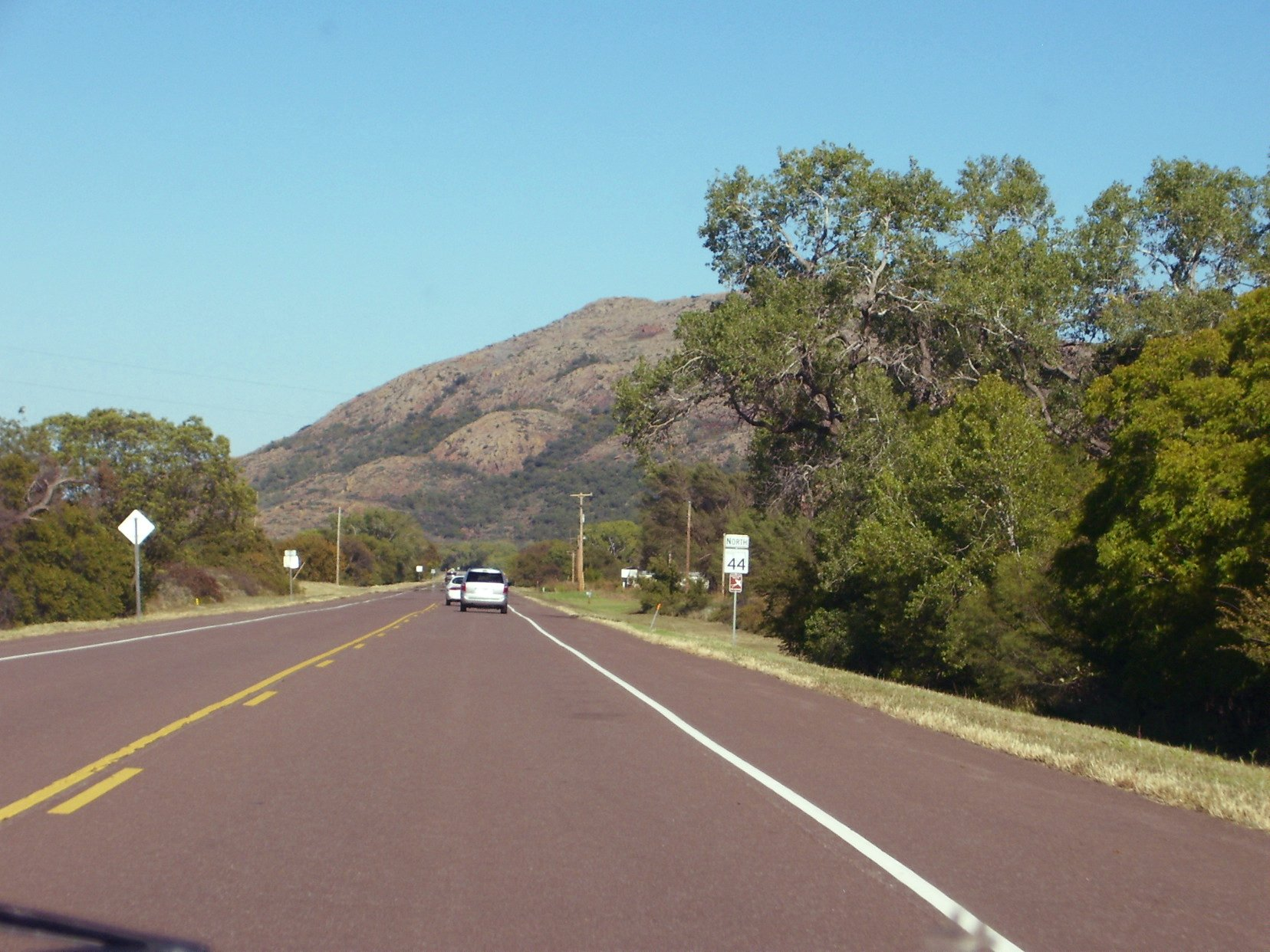
SH-44 begins in the Quartz Mountains of southwest Oklahoma.

State Highway 44 begins at an intersection with the Great Plains Trail of Oklahoma in the Quartz Mountains, just northwest of Byrd Mountain in Greer County. From the terminus, SH-44 heads northeast, crossing the North Fork of the Red River into Kiowa County. Just after crossing the river, the highway spawns its only spur route, SH-44A. The road continues through the Quartz Mountains, passing in between Williams Peak and King Mountain. The route then follows the south shore of Lake Altus-Lugert, passing between the lakeshore and Mount Lugert. As SH-44 leaves the mountains, it passes through the unincorporated place of Lugert, from which both the lake and the mountain get their name. The highway then heads north-northwest until it reaches SH-9 on the east side of Lone Wolf. It follows SH-9 to the east before splitting off along a due north course. The highway curves northeast to cross Elm Creek, the turns back to the north just after crossing into Washita County.

The first town that SH-44 encounters in Washita County is Sentinel, where it meets SH-55. The highway continues north, paralleling a railroad track, before crossing over it about 2.5 miles (4.0 km) north of Sentinel and resuming its due north course. West-northwest of Dill City, Oklahoma, SH-44 intersects SH-152. About 4 miles (6.4 km) north of this junction, SH-44 passes along the east side of Burns Flat. The next highway junction is an interchange with Interstate 40, at exit 53. After the interchange, SH-44 crosses Turkey Creek and runs through the small town of Foss. Just north of town, the highway passes into Custer County.

In Custer County, Highway 44 meets up with SH-73. The two routes form a brief concurrency, splitting up when they reach Foss State Park. SH-44 hugs the east side of Foss Lake, then runs across its dam. Four miles (6.4 km) north of where it exits the park, SH-44 ends in Butler at State Highway 33.

== History ==
The current iteration of State Highway 44 was first added to the Oklahoma State Highway system on April 14, 1932. The highway as originally designated was a split route; its southern section began at SH-34 in Eldorado, and proceeded northeast to end at US-62 west of Altus. Another section of SH-44 began at the route's current southern terminus and ended at SH-41 in Dill (present-day SH-152 in Dill City). A third section of highway began concurrent with SH-33 west of Custer City, and proceeded east through that town through Thomas. It then turned north on what is now SH-58 and followed what is now that highway's route to Cleo Springs. Thereafter, SH-44 began following SH-8. At Driftwood, SH-44 turned east on an independent alignment roughly corresponding to today's SH-11. The highway's northern terminus was US-81 in Medford, where SH-11 took over the alignment.

In 1934, the section of highway between SH-33 and Canton was made part of US-270, and SH-44's northernmost section was truncated to Canton. At the same time, the section of road east of Driftwood became part of SH-11, so its northern terminus was truncated to US-60 in Fairview. On March 29, 1937, the majority of the northern section of route was transferred to SH-58.

On December 14, 1942, SH-44 was extended north of Dill for the first time, bringing it to a southern terminus at US-66 south of Foss.

SH-44 was first made a contiguous route at the beginning of the summer of 1962. On May 6, the two sections of SH-44 were joined by means of a concurrency with US-62 to Altus, where it turned north along US-283, which it followed to the present-day southern terminus. Around the same time, changes were brewing at the north end of the highway. SH-44 was extended north to Butler on September 4, 1963. At this time, SH-44 ran from SH-34 in Eldorado to Butler.

The southernmost portion of SH-44 would soon undergo changes. On July 7, 1975, State Highway 6 was introduced over the portion of highway between Eldorado and the current southern terminus. On January 5, 1987, the portion of SH-44 made redundant by SH-6 was removed from the highway, truncating it to its current southern terminus.

== Junction list ==
County	Location	mi	km	Destinations	Notes
Greer		0.00	0.00	Great Plains Trail of Oklahoma	Southern terminus; road continues as Great Plains Trl. of Oklahoma south
North Fork Red River				Victor Wickersham Memorial Bridge	
Kiowa		1.6	2.6	SH-44A	Southern terminus of SH-44A
Kiowa	Lone Wolf	11.3	18.2	SH-9 west (Main Street) – Granite	Southern end of SH-9 concurrency
Kiowa		14.5	23.3	SH-9 east	Northern end of SH-9 concurrency
Washita	Sentinel	25.3	40.7	SH-55 west (Main Street)	Southern end of SH-55 concurrency
Washita	Sentinel	25.4	40.9	SH-55 east (Boundary Street)	Northern end of SH-55 concurrency
Washita		34.6	55.7	SH-152	
Washita	Foss	45.2	72.7	I-40 – Oklahoma City, Amarillo	I-40 exit 53
Custer		49.8	80.1	SH-73 east	Southern end of SH-73 concurrency
Custer	Foss State Park	51.6	83.0	SH-73 west	Northern end of SH-73 concurrency
Custer	Butler	59.2	95.3	SH-33 (Broadway Street)	Northern terminus; road continues as Wachholtz Avenue
1.000 mi = 1.609 km; 1.000 km = 0.621 mi: Concurrency terminus

== SH-44A ==
State Highway 44A
- Location: Kiowa County
- Length: 1.43 mi (2.30 km)

State Highway 44's one lettered spur route is SH-44A. This route branches off from SH-44 in the Quartz Mountains and connects to the Quartz Mountains Conference Center and the southern end of Lake Altus-Lugert.
