= KECO =

- Elk City, Oklahoma; United States
- Broadcast area: Southwestern Oklahoma
- Frequency: 96.5 MHz
- Branding: 96.5 KECO

Programming
- Format: Country
- Affiliations: Fox News Radio

Ownership
- Owner: Blake Brewer; (Paragon Communications, Inc.)
- Sister stations: KADS, KXOO

History
- First air date: July 20, 1982

Technical information
- Licensing authority: FCC
- Facility ID: 51564
- Class: C1
- ERP: 100,000 watts
- HAAT: 210 meters (690 ft)
- Transmitter coordinates: 35°24′22.10″N 99°29′55.30″W

Links
- Public license information: Public file; LMS
- Webcast: Listen live
- Website: www.kecofm.com

KECO (96.5 FM) is a radio station broadcasting a country music format. The station is licensed to Elk City, Oklahoma, United States, and is owned by Paragon Communications, Inc.

== History ==
KECO began broadcasting on July 20, 1982; it was a country music station owned by Ronca Broadcasting, a company controlled by Elk City farmer Ron Sewell. Ronca sold KECO to John B. Walton in 1984; Walton had previously been the licensee of KIKX in Tucson, Arizona, which had lost its FCC license and left the air in 1982 after a kidnapping hoax. Walton sold a stake in the station to Dean Peninger, the general manager of Elk City station KADS, then sold it back to Sewell for assumption of debts in 1986.

Paragon Broadcasting, a company of Mary Ann and Cletis Killiam, acquired KECO from Ronca Broadcasting in 1992. Paragon owned the station for two years, selling to Brooks Brewer in 1994; Brewer owned the construction permit for KZRU (later on air as KXOO) as well as KOKL in Okmulgee.
