= KCDL =

KCDL may refer to:

- KCDL-LD, a defunct low-power television station (channel 36, virtual 42) formerly licensed to serve Boise, Idaho, United States; see List of television stations in Idaho
- KCLI-FM, a radio station (99.3 FM) licensed to serve Cordell, Oklahoma, United States, which held the call sign KCDL from 1991 to 2010
