= Fort Cobb Reservoir =

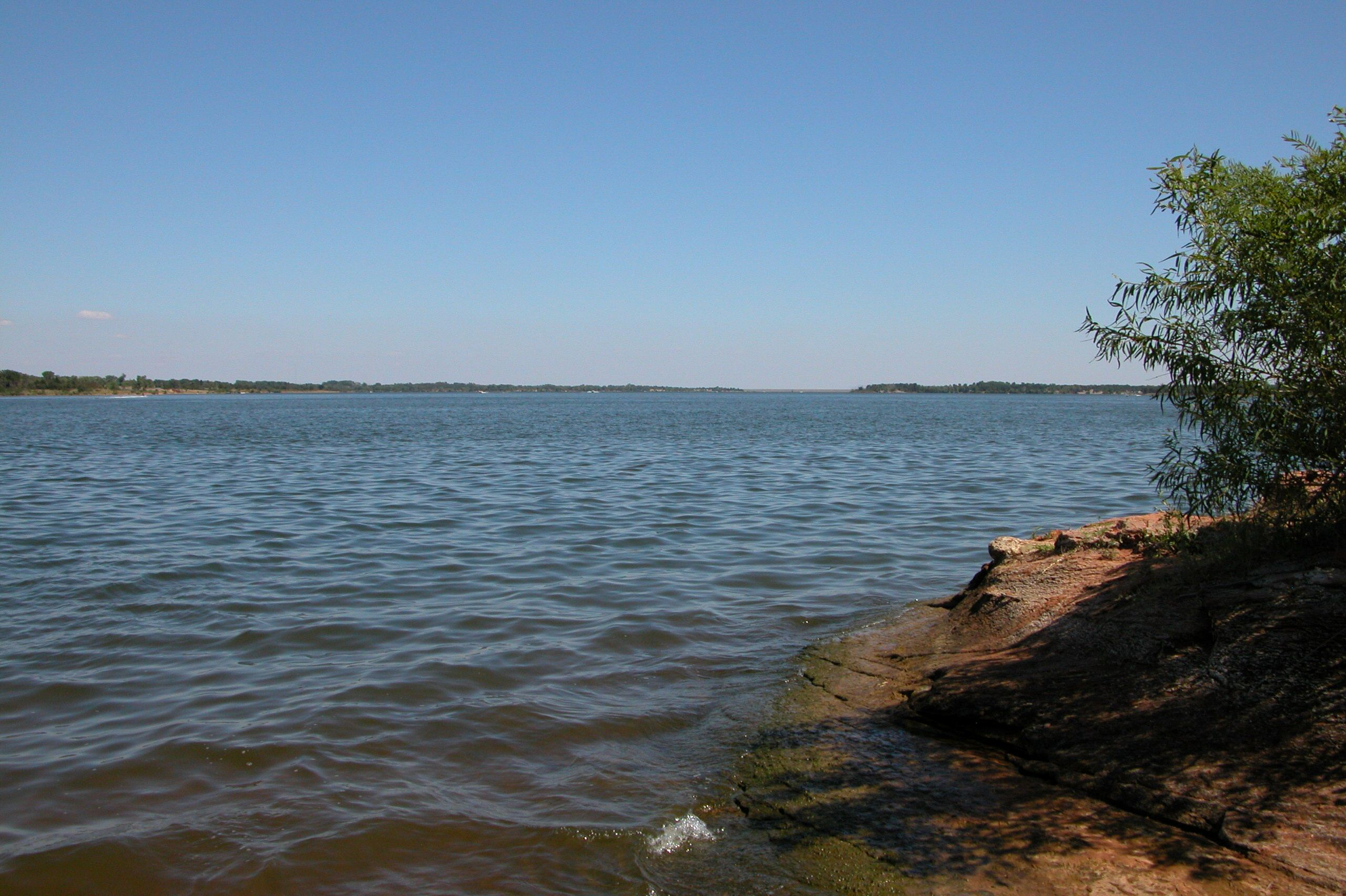

- Location within Oklahoma Location within the United States
- Location: Caddo County, Oklahoma
- Coordinates: 35°12′N 98°29′W
- Lake type: reservoir
- Primary inflows: Cobb Creek, Lake Creek
- Basin countries: United States
- Surface area: 4,000 acres (1,600 ha)
- Water volume: 143,700 acre-feet (177,300,000 m^{3})
- Shore length^{1}: 45 mi (72 km)
- Surface elevation: 1,342 feet (409 m)
- Settlements: Fort Cobb, Oklahoma; Carnegie, Oklahoma
- ^{1} Shore length is not a well-defined measure.

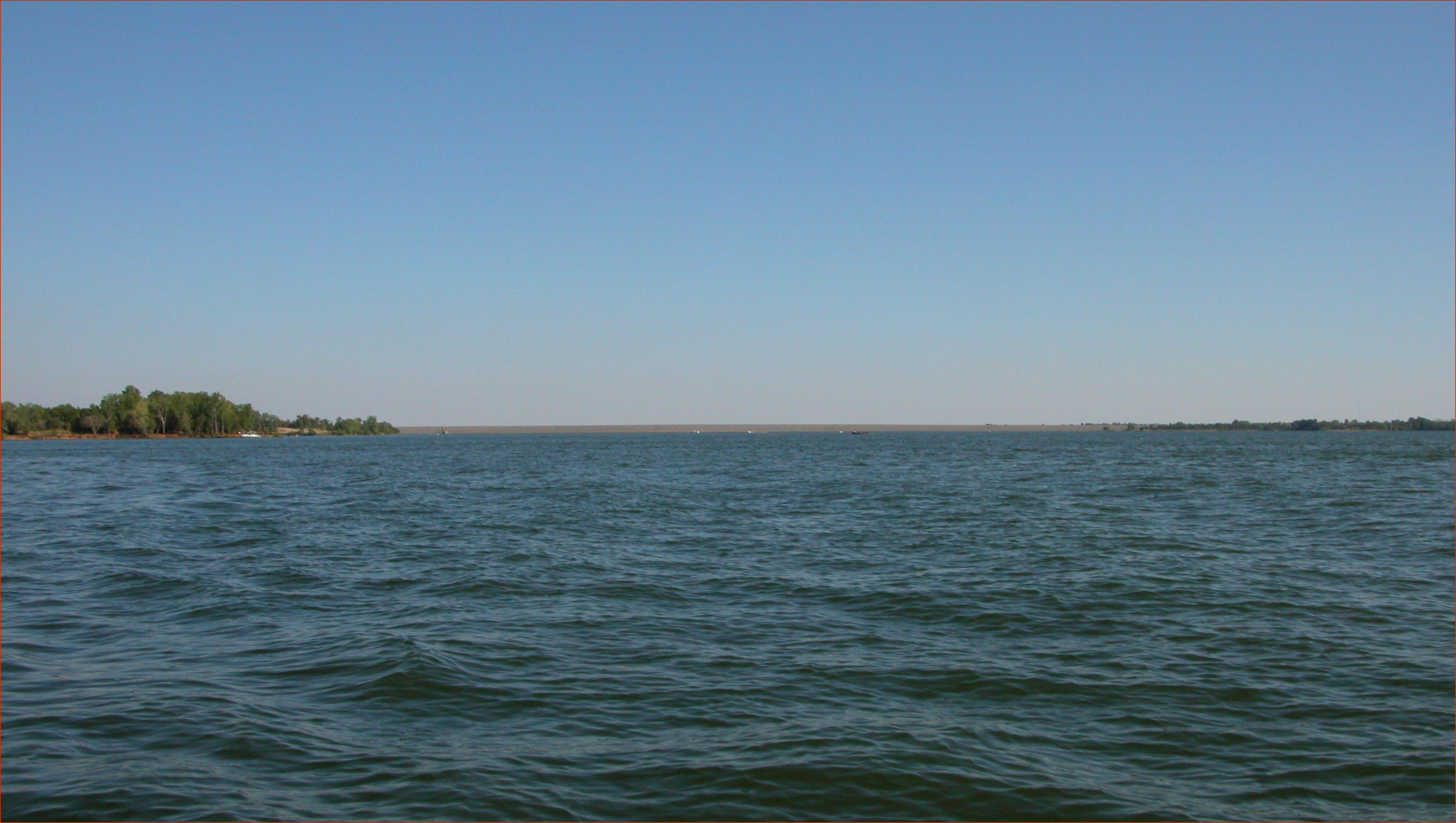
View of Fort Cobb Dam from lake

Fort Cobb Reservoir (also called Fort Cobb Lake) is a reservoir located in Caddo County in the U.S. state of Oklahoma. It impounds the waters of Cobb Creek (joining from the west), Lake Creek (joining from the north), and Willow Creek (joining from the northeast). The lake covers approximately 4,000 acres (16 km^{2}) of water and 45 mi (72 km) of shoreline. Its drainage area is 285 square miles (740 km^{2}). It was constructed in 1958. The towns of Carnegie, Fort Cobb, and Eakly are located nearby.

Fort Cobb Dam is on Cobb Creek about 5 miles (8.0 km) north of Fort Cobb, and roughly 5 miles (8.0 km) above the confluence of Cobb Creek with the Washita River. The dam is a zoned earthfill structure containing 3,569,185 cubic yards (2,729,000 m^{3}) of embankment. The crest width is 30 feet (9.1 m), and the crest length is 9,900 feet (3.0 km). The structural height of the dam is 122 feet (37 m).

Fort Cobb Reservoir has a total capacity of 143,740 acre-feet (177,300,000 m^{3}) and covers an area of 5,956 acres (24.10 km^{2}) at top of flood pool level. The uncontrolled morning-glory spillway in the left abutment consists of a concrete intake structure, concrete conduit, and concrete chute and stilling basin.</ref>

The Fort Cobb Reservoir is part of the Washita Basin Project of the Bureau of Reclamation, which also includes Foss Reservoir on the Washita River in Custer County, along with numerous small flood-control structures on creeks and streams. Municipal and industrial water is supplied to the city of Anadarko and Western Farmers Electric Cooperative through the Anadarko Aqueduct which begins at the Fort Cobb Reservoir.

== Recreation and fish and wildlife ==
Fort Cobb Reservoir provides over 2,000 acres (8.1 km^{2}) of land and some 2,300 acres (9.3 km^{2}) of water surface areas for recreation and includes 1,800 acres (7.3 km^{2}) of land and 1,800 acres (7.3 km^{2}) of water surface area for wildlife management. This reservoir provides some 45 mi (72 km) of shoreline at top of conservation pool. The recreation areas are administered by the Oklahoma Tourism and Recreation Department and the wildlife management area is administered by the Oklahoma Department of Wildlife Conservation. Since reservoir releases are primarily for municipal and industrial demands and flood control, the reservoir does not normally experience drastic drawdowns.

The primary fish species include white and smallmouth bass, channel catfish, walleye, bluegill, bullhead, saugeye and crappie.</ref>

The lake offers five RV campgrounds, one RV & Tent campground and four tent campgrounds on the southeast and southwest area of Fort Cobb Lake. Fort Cobb State Park and the wildlife management areas of the lake.
