= KWEY =

KWEY may refer to:

- KWEY (AM), a radio station (1590 AM) licensed to Weatherford, Oklahoma, United States
- KWEY-FM, a radio station (95.5 FM) licensed to Clinton, Oklahoma
- "Kwey" is a traditional greeting amongst the Algonquin people.
