= Spring Creek (Neosho River Tributary) =

Location
- Country: United States

Physical characteristics
- Source
  - location: north of Kansas, Oklahoma
  - coordinates: 36°13′31″N 94°47′31″W
- Mouth: Fort Gibson Lake
  - location: south of Murphy, Oklahoma
  - coordinates: 36°06′44″N 95°15′30″W

Spring Creek originates in Eastern Oklahoma near the town of Kansas, and flows generally southwest about 34 miles through Delaware, Cherokee, and Mayes counties before emptying into Fort Gibson Lake on the Grand (Neosho) River. Throughout its roughly 117,000 acre watershed, the creek is fed by small springs which contribute most of the estimated 15 million gallons of water that flow through it per day. Spring Creek is listed as having high quality water, being one of only five bodies of water in the state having this rating.

This creek is not to be confused with the Spring Creek in Roger Mills County in Western Oklahoma, which feeds Spring Creek Lake before becoming a tributary of the Washita River, nor with the Spring Creek that fills Lake Chickasha in Caddo County, Oklahoma, near Chickasha in Central Oklahoma, nor with any of the other watercourses in Oklahoma with the Spring Creek name, nor with numerous other watercourses named Spring Creek in other states and countries.
