= Spring Creek Township =

Spring Creek Township may refer to:

== Arkansas ==
- Spring Creek Township, Lee County, Arkansas
- Spring Creek Township, Phillips County, Arkansas

== Illinois ==
- Spring Creek Township, Pike County, Illinois

== Iowa ==
- Spring Creek Township, Black Hawk County, Iowa
- Spring Creek Township, Mahaska County, Iowa
- Spring Creek Township, Tama County, Iowa

== Kansas ==
- Spring Creek Township, Coffey County, Kansas
- Spring Creek Township, Cowley County, Kansas
- Spring Creek Township, Greenwood County, Kansas
- Spring Creek Township, Pottawatomie County, Kansas, in Pottawatomie County, Kansas
- Spring Creek Township, Saline County, Kansas, in Saline County, Kansas

== Minnesota ==
- Spring Creek Township, Becker County, Minnesota
- Spring Creek Township, Norman County, Minnesota

== Missouri ==
- Spring Creek Township, Ozark County, Missouri
- Spring Creek Township, Howell County, Missouri
- Spring Creek Township, Phelps County, Missouri
- Spring Creek Township, Shannon County, Missouri
- Spring Creek Township, Douglas County, Missouri
- Spring Creek Township, Maries County, Missouri

== Nebraska ==
- Spring Creek Township, Custer County, Nebraska

== North Dakota ==
- Spring Creek Township, Barnes County, North Dakota

== Ohio ==
- Springcreek Township, Miami County, Ohio

== Oklahoma ==
- Spring Creek Township, Logan County, Oklahoma
- Spring Creek Township, Oklahoma County, Oklahoma

== Pennsylvania ==
- Spring Creek Township, Elk County, Pennsylvania
- Spring Creek Township, Warren County, Pennsylvania

== South Dakota ==
- Spring Creek Township, Moody County, South Dakota

== See also ==
- Spring Creek (disambiguation)
- Spring Creek East Township, Dent County, Missouri
- Spring Creek West Township, Dent County, Missouri
