= Elk City Regional Business Airport =

- IATA: ELK; ICAO: KELK; FAA LID: ELK

Summary
- Airport type: Public
- Owner: City of Elk City
- Serves: Elk City, Oklahoma
- Elevation AMSL: 2,013 ft (614 m)
- Coordinates: 35°25′50.80″N 099°23′39.40″W
- Website: website
- Interactive map of Elk City Regional Business Airport

Runways
Direction	Length		Surface
Direction	ft	m	Surface
17/35	5,399	1,646	Asphalt

Statistics (2007)
- Aircraft operations: 2,000
- Based aircraft: 23
- Source: Federal Aviation Administration

Elk City Regional Business Airport (IATA: ELK, ICAO: KELK, FAA LID: ELK) is a city-owned public-use airport located one mile northeast of the central business district of Elk CIty, a city in Beckham County, Oklahoma, United States.

There is also an airport in Elk City, Idaho. The FAA LID for that one is S90.

== Facilities and aircraft ==
Elk City Regional Airport covers an area of 364 acres at an elevation of 2,013 feet (613.6 m) above mean sea level. It has one runway: 17/35 is 5,399 by 75 feet (1,646 x 23 m) with an asphalt surface.

For the 12-month period ending April 25, 2008, the airport had 2,000 aircraft operations, an average of 38 per week: 100% general aviation. At that time there were 23 aircraft based at this airport: 20 single-engine, 1 multi-engine and 1 helicopter and 1 ultralight.

== See also ==
- List of airports in Oklahoma
