= Elk City Daily News =

Newspaper from Elk City, Oklahoma

The Elk City Daily News
- Type: Weekly newspaper
- Format: Broadsheet
- Founded: 1901
- Headquarters: 109 West Broadway, Elk City, Oklahoma 73648 United States
- Circulation: 6,900
- Website: elkcityoknews.com

The Elk City Daily News is an American weekly newspaper published every Saturday, in Elk City, Oklahoma.

== History ==
The newspaper has been in publication since 1901, six years prior to Oklahoma statehood. The publication was previously owned by several members of the Wade Family of Elk City, including Elizabeth Wade (2011–2018), Larry R. Wade (1969–2011), and Paul R. Wade (193x–1972).
