= Crowder Lake University Park =

Reservoir in Washita County, Oklahoma, United States

- Location within Oklahoma
- Location: Washita County, Oklahoma
- Coordinates: 35.397°N 98.705°W
- Type: reservoir

Crowder Lake University Park is a reservoir in Washita County, Oklahoma, 8 miles (13 km) south of Weatherford on SH 54, 2 miles (3.2 km) east and 1 mile (1.6 km) south on County Road, then 0.75 miles (1.21 km) west on Park Road. The 22 acres (8.9 ha) park is on the 158 acres (64 ha) Crowder Lake. Once a state park, it has been owned and operated by Southwestern Oklahoma State University (SWOSU) since 2003.

== History ==
Cobb Creek Site 1 (as the reservoir was originally named) was constructed on Cobb Creek for flood control in 1958 by the Deer Creek Conservation District with assistance of the Oklahoma Conservation Commission and the USDA Natural Resources Conservation Service Watershed Protection and Flood Prevention Program. The dam was originally designed as a low hazard dam and constructed to protect rural agricultural land from flooding. Because of later development downstream, the dam was reclassified as high hazard in 2006. The dam was rehabilitated to bring it up to current dam safety criteria and extend its life for another 100 years. Rehabilitation included raising the height of the dam, replacing the principal spillway and widening the auxiliary spillway.

Flooding occurred frequently in the watershed before the watershed project was implemented. From 1923 to 1942 there were 13 floods where water covered more than one-half of the watershed flood plain and 67 smaller floods.

In 1983 the Oklahoma Tourism and Recreation Department (OTRD) created a state park around the lake and which it named as Crowder Lake State Park. In 1997 SWOSU took over management of the park and in 2003 the OTRD transferred the lake to SWOSU and it became known as Crowder Lake University Park.
