= Washita National Wildlife Refuge =

Protected area in Oklahoma, United States

- IUCN category IV (habitat/species management area)
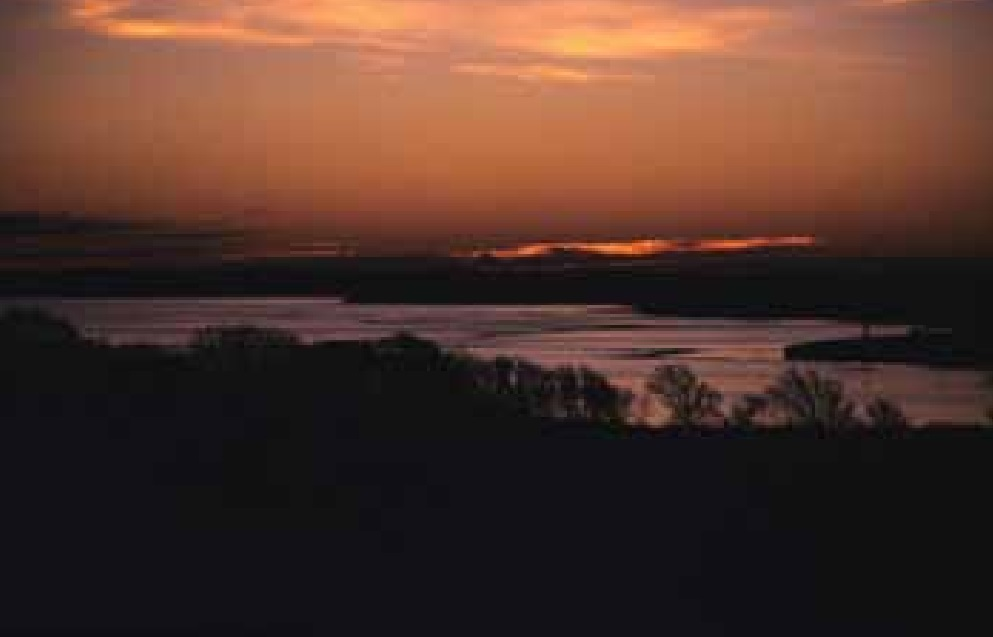
- Sunset at Washita NWR. 22 November 2013. Courtesy U.S. Fish & Wildlife Service

- Location within the United States
- Location: Custer County, Oklahoma, United States
- Nearest city: Butler, Oklahoma<"EOHC-WNWR">
- Coordinates: 35.60838°N 99.25065°W
- Area: 8,075 acres (32.68 km^{2})
- Established: 1961<"EOHC-WNWR"/>
- Governing body: U.S. Fish and Wildlife Service
- Website: Washita National Wildlife Refuge

Washita National Wildlife Refuge is a National Wildlife Refuge (NWR) of the United States located in Custer County, Oklahoma. Created in 1961 on the shore of Foss Lake, it was the fourth NWR in the state. It is 5 miles (8.0 km) west of Butler, Oklahoma.

Within the refuge, the slow-moving Washita River winds through prairie and cropland to merge with Foss Reservoir, providing a home and resting area for geese and other waterfowl. Gently rolling hills, ravines, and bottomlands laced with creeks shelter wildlife as common as white-tailed deer and as unusual as the Texas horned lizard, a state-listed endangered species.

The United States Fish and Wildlife Service has reported 270 bird species as having been seen in the NWR. These include occasional sightings of the bald eagle and rare sightings of whooping cranes. Outdoor activities allowed in the NWR include birdwatching, boating, hiking, fishing, and limited hunting. Hunting is allowed only in certain seasons and with special permits. Quarry includes deer, geese, sandhill cranes, quail, and rabbits.
