= Butler, Oklahoma =

- Town
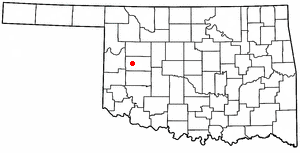
- Location of Butler, Oklahoma
- Coordinates: 35°38′11″N 99°11′11″W
- Country: United States
- State: Oklahoma
- County: Custer

Area
  - Total: 0.42 sq mi (1.10 km^{2})
  - Land: 0.42 sq mi (1.10 km^{2})
  - Water: 0 sq mi (0.00 km^{2})
- Elevation: 1,768 ft (539 m)

Population (2020)
  - Total: 208
  - Density: 488.6/sq mi (188.64/km^{2})
- Time zone: UTC-6 (Central (CST))
  - Summer (DST): UTC-5 (CDT)
- ZIP code: 73625
- Area code: 580
- FIPS code: 40-10450
- GNIS feature ID: 2411749

Butler is a town in Custer County, Oklahoma, United States. The population was 208 at the time of the 2020 census, down from 287 at the 2010 census.

== Geography ==
Butler is located in western Custer County at the intersection of state highways 33 and 44. Highway 33 leads west 11 miles (18 km) to Hammon and east 12 miles (19 km) to U.S. Route 183, which in turn leads 8.5 miles (13.7 km) south to Clinton, the Custer County seat. Highway 44 leads south from Butler 14 miles (23 km) to Foss and Interstate 40.

According to the United States Census Bureau, Butler has a total area of 1.0 square mile (2.6 km^{2}), all land. Foss Reservoir is 5 miles (8 km) south of Butler.

=== Climate ===
Climate data for Butler, Oklahoma
Month	Jan	Feb	Mar	Apr	May	Jun	Jul	Aug	Sep	Oct	Nov	Dec	Year
Mean daily maximum °F (°C)	47.8 (8.8)	53.1 (11.7)	62.2 (16.8)	72.9 (22.7)	80.5 (26.9)	89.4 (31.9)	95.6 (35.3)	93.3 (34.1)	84.6 (29.2)	74.4 (23.6)	60.2 (15.7)	49.9 (9.9)	72.0 (22.2)
Mean daily minimum °F (°C)	19.1 (−7.2)	24.4 (−4.2)	32.6 (0.3)	44.1 (6.7)	53.3 (11.8)	63.5 (17.5)	68.4 (20.2)	66.5 (19.2)	57.9 (14.4)	44.6 (7.0)	32.6 (0.3)	22.4 (−5.3)	44.1 (6.7)
Average precipitation inches (mm)	0.7 (18)	1.1 (28)	1.9 (48)	2.0 (51)	4.2 (110)	3.8 (97)	2.0 (51)	3.0 (76)	3.1 (79)	2.0 (51)	1.6 (41)	0.8 (20)	26.2 (670)
Source: Weatherbase.com

== Demographics ==
Historical population
Census	Pop.	Note	%±
1920	332		—
1930	473		42.5%
1940	428		−9.5%
1950	351		−18.0%
1960	351		0.0%
1970	315		−10.3%
1980	388		23.2%
1990	341		−12.1%
2000	345		1.2%
2010	287		−16.8%
2020	208		−27.5%
U.S. Decennial Census

As of the census of 2000, there were 345 people, 138 households, and 104 families residing in the town. The population density was 815.0 inhabitants per square mile (314.7/km^{2}). There were 160 housing units at an average density of 378.0 per square mile (145.9/km^{2}). The racial makeup of the town was 89.28% White, 0.87% Native American, 0.29% Asian, 4.93% from other races, and 4.64% from two or more races. Hispanic or Latino of any race were 11.88% of the population.

There were 138 households, out of which 28.3% had children under the age of 18 living with them, 59.4% were married couples living together, 13.0% had a female householder with no husband present, and 24.6% were non-families. 21.7% of all households were made up of individuals, and 11.6% had someone living alone who was 65 years of age or older. The average household size was 2.50 and the average family size was 2.88.

In the town, the population was spread out, with 24.1% under the age of 18, 7.2% from 18 to 24, 25.2% from 25 to 44, 27.0% from 45 to 64, and 16.5% who were 65 years of age or older. The median age was 40 years. For every 100 females, there were 84.5 males. For every 100 females age 18 and over, there were 94.1 males.

The median income for a household in the town was $29,375, and the median income for a family was $32,083. Males had a median income of $25,500 versus $24,583 for females. The per capita income for the town was $13,917. About 18.4% of families and 29.8% of the population were below the poverty line, including 51.5% of those under age 18 and 7.0% of those age 65 or over.

== Education ==
Butler is in the Arapaho Public Schools school district.

There was previously a Butler school district. In 1989, the district's enrollment was 180. In 2008, the district administration was seeking a merger with Arapaho school district. The merger occurred that year.
