= Foss, Oklahoma =

- Town
- Foss State Park

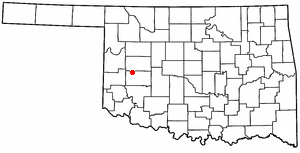
- Location of Foss shown in Oklahoma
- Coordinates: 35°27′00″N 99°10′15″W
- Country: United States
- State: Oklahoma
- County: Washita

Area
  - Total: 0.74 sq mi (1.91 km^{2})
  - Land: 0.74 sq mi (1.91 km^{2})
  - Water: 0 sq mi (0.00 km^{2})
- Elevation: 1,621 ft (494 m)

Population (2020)
  - Total: 101
  - Density: 137.2/sq mi (52.96/km^{2})
- Time zone: UTC-6 (Central (CST))
  - Summer (DST): UTC-5 (CDT)
- ZIP code: 73647
- Area code: 580
- FIPS code: 40-27450
- GNIS feature ID: 2412645
- Website: freepages.history.rootsweb.ancestry.com/~gtusa/usa/ok/foss.htm

Foss is a town in Washita County, Oklahoma, United States. As of the 2020 census, Foss had a population of 101.

== History ==
The history of Foss began when settlers from the area of the Wilson post office moved four miles north to the valley of Turkey Creek in the late 1890s. They initially wanted their new post office to be called Graham, but since that name was already taken it was named Maharg (an anagram of Graham). A flash flood on May 2, 1902, wiped out the town on Turkey Creek, destroying businesses and drowning several people. The town rebuilt on higher ground and was named Foss. The post office began operation on September 15, 1900.

The town expanded rapidly. By 1905 the town had a population between 900 and 1000 residents. It had two banks, three cotton gins, and by 1912 had an electric plant, two hotels and an opera house. It also had plants to manufacture hay balers, baby carriages, and brooms. The population stabilized near 500. In the 1920s the town began to have economic problems as the nearby cities of Clinton and Elk City absorbed more and more trade. During the Great Depression more people moved away.

During World War II, the town boasted a population of over 300 residents, relying primarily on Route 66 travellers (which passed half a mile south of the city) and a U.S. naval base south of the town that operated during wartime. A filling station and a café also operated in the town around that time.

Though in the 1950s and 1960s there was an economic revival due to the nearby Clinton-Sherman Air Force Base at Burns Flat. When the base closed and Interstate 40 bypassed Foss the town declined further. The last bank left in September 1977.

Foss had two newspapers, the Foss Enterprise and the Foss Banner. It was served by the Choctaw, Oklahoma and Gulf Railroad (Rock Island) railroad. The Enterprise went out of business in the 1930s.

== Geography ==
According to the United States Census Bureau, the town has a total area of 0.7 square miles (1.8 km^{2}), all land.

Foss is at the intersection of Interstate 40 and Oklahoma State Highway 44.

Foss State Park on Foss Reservoir is about 6 miles to the north. The Washita National Wildlife Refuge is at the north end of Foss Reservoir.

== Demographics ==
Historical population
Census	Pop.	Note	%±
1910	525		—
1920	348		−33.7%
1930	524		50.6%
1940	306		−41.6%
1950	210		−31.4%
1960	289		37.6%
1970	150		−48.1%
1980	188		25.3%
1990	143		−23.9%
2000	127		−11.2%
2010	151		18.9%
2020	101		−33.1%
U.S. Decennial Census

=== 2020 census ===
As of the 2020 census, Foss had a population of 101. The median age was 50.1 years. 25.7% of residents were under the age of 18 and 19.8% of residents were 65 years of age or older. For every 100 females there were 87.0 males, and for every 100 females age 18 and over there were 87.5 males age 18 and over.

0.0% of residents lived in urban areas, while 100.0% lived in rural areas.

There were 47 households in Foss, of which 25.5% had children under the age of 18 living in them. Of all households, 44.7% were married-couple households, 19.1% were households with a male householder and no spouse or partner present, and 29.8% were households with a female householder and no spouse or partner present. About 36.2% of all households were made up of individuals and 17.0% had someone living alone who was 65 years of age or older.

There were 65 housing units, of which 27.7% were vacant. The homeowner vacancy rate was 0.0% and the rental vacancy rate was 37.5%.

Racial composition as of the 2020 census
Race	Number	Percent
White	72	71.3%
Black or African American	0	0.0%
American Indian and Alaska Native	3	3.0%
Asian	0	0.0%
Native Hawaiian and Other Pacific Islander	0	0.0%
Some other race	5	5.0%
Two or more races	21	20.8%
Hispanic or Latino (of any race)	20	19.8%

=== 2000 census ===
As of the census of 2000, there were 127 people, 55 households, and 38 families residing in the town. The population density was 174.9 inhabitants per square mile (67.5/km^{2}). There were 69 housing units at an average density of 95.0 per square mile (36.7/km^{2}). The racial makeup of the town was 81.89% White, 7.09% Native American, 0.79% Asian, 3.94% from other races, and 6.30% from two or more races. Hispanic or Latino of any race were 7.87% of the population.

There were 55 households, out of which 25.5% had children under the age of 18 living with them, 50.9% were married couples living together, 10.9% had a female householder with no husband present, and 30.9% were non-families. 29.1% of all households were made up of individuals, and 5.5% had someone living alone who was 65 years of age or older. The average household size was 2.31 and the average family size was 2.84.

In the town, the population was spread out, with 23.6% under the age of 18, 5.5% from 18 to 24, 27.6% from 25 to 44, 31.5% from 45 to 64, and 11.8% who were 65 years of age or older. The median age was 39 years. For every 100 females, there were 95.4 males. For every 100 females age 18 and over, there were 115.6 males.

The median income for a household in the town was $29,375, and the median income for a family was $33,750. Males had a median income of $35,750 versus $15,625 for females. The per capita income for the town was $12,168. There were 11.1% of families and 10.4% of the population living below the poverty line, including 11.4% of under eighteens and none of those over 64.

== Economy ==
Foss was an important agricultural center in the early part of the 20th century. It has declined in importance, but is still a small agricultural center.
