= Elk City, Oklahoma =

City in Oklahoma, US

- City
- Logo

- Location in Beckham County and Oklahoma

- Location in Oklahoma Location in the United States
- Coordinates: 35°23′10″N 99°25′48″W
- Country: United States
- State: Oklahoma
- County: Beckham
- Founded: 1901

Area
  - Total: 16.15 sq mi (41.84 km^{2})
  - Land: 15.93 sq mi (41.26 km^{2})
  - Water: 0.22 sq mi (0.58 km^{2})
- Elevation: 1,936 ft (590 m)

Population (2020)
  - Total: 11,561
  - Density: 725.8/sq mi (280.22/km^{2})
- Time zone: UTC-6 (Central (CST))
  - Summer (DST): UTC-5 (CDT)
- ZIP codes: 73644, 73648
- Area code: 580
- FIPS code: 40-23500
- GNIS feature ID: 2410424
- Website: elkcity.com

Elk City is a city in Beckham County, Oklahoma, United States. The population was 11,561 at the time of the 2020 census, a slight decrease from the 11,693 recorded in the 2010 census. Elk City is located on Interstate 40 and Historic U.S. Route 66 in western Oklahoma, approximately 110 miles (180 km) west of Oklahoma City and 150 miles (240 km) east of Amarillo, Texas.

== History ==
=== European exploration ===
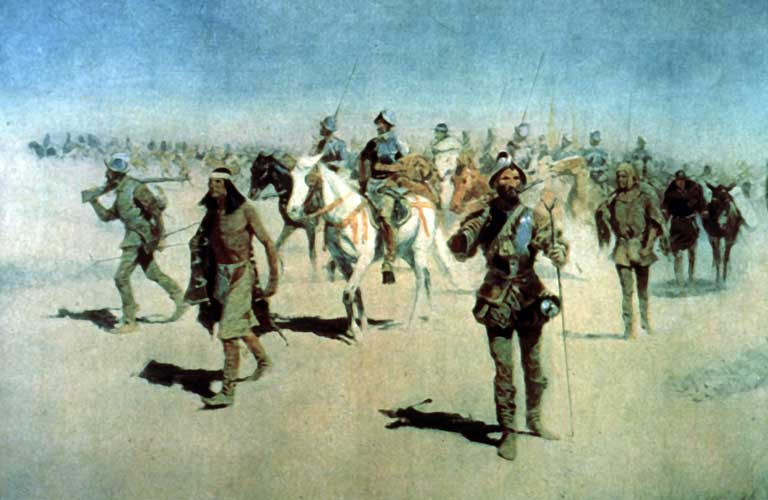
Coronado Sets Out to the North, by Frederic Remington, 1861–1909

In 1541, Francisco Vásquez de Coronado became the first known European to pass through the area. The Spanish conquistador was traveling northeast across the prairie in search of a place called Quivira, a city said to be fabulously wealthy with gold.

=== Founding to statehood ===
Elk City's history dates back to the days immediately following the opening of the Cheyenne-Arapaho reservation in western Oklahoma Territory on April 19, 1892, when the first white settlers made their appearance. Prior to this time, many early ranchers had driven cattle over the Great Western Cattle Trail from Texas to Dodge City, Kansas; Elk City lies on the route of that trail.

The creation of Elk City was an idea conceived by land promoters from Weatherford, Oklahoma, when they learned that the Choctaw, Oklahoma and Gulf Railroad (CO & G) was coming to the area (in 1898, the CO & G Railroad completed its western route to Weatherford; beginning in 1901, it continued building west). They formed the Choctaw Townsite and Development Company. These men with great foresight determined that the area at the source of Elk Creek would be an ideal location for a town, so they came to the area to purchase lands from the homesteaders who had claims along the railroad.

Probably the most important day in Elk City's history is March 20, 1901, the date the first lots were sold by the Choctaw Townsite and Development Company. By this time, hundreds of prospective purchasers had built a tent city. On that day, the townsite company sold $32,000 worth of property (about $870,000 in 2012 dollars) and continued doing a good business for some time thereafter.

There is some confusion about how Elk City got its name. Elk City was so named because it is located at the head of Elk Creek, which in turn was named by U.S. Army Captain Randolph B. Marcy who was leading an expedition to explore the Red River in 1852. Marcy and his troops had left the Wichita Mountains and the waterway which he named Otter Creek during his exploration, and they were traveling northwest along the North Fork of the Red River. On May 31, in the official journal of the expedition, Marcy wrote about the productive soil, the dense grass, and the vertical red clay banks of a "bold running stream of good water." Continuing, he wrote, "From the circumstance of having seen elk tracks upon the stream we passed in our march today, I have called it 'Elk Creek'. I am informed by our guide that five years since, elk were frequently seen in the Wichita Mountains; but now they are seldom met with in this part of the country." Confusion also stems from the early post offices that served the residents of the town. Even though the town of Elk City has had only one name, its early settlers were served by a post office named Crowe, and later, one named Busch. Consequently, on many early maps of Oklahoma Territory the names of "Crowe" or "Busch" are seen instead of "Elk City". Finally, on July 20, 1907, shortly before statehood, the Busch Post Office had its name officially changed to Elk City Post Office.

On August 13, 1901, the Choctaw, Oklahoma and Gulf Railroad (purchased in 1904 by the Chicago, Rock Island and Pacific Railroad in 1904) laid its last rail on the so-called "Choctaw Route", bringing rail access to Elk City. The first regular train service commenced seven days later on August 20, and city folk rejoiced, predicting that the dugouts, claim shacks, and prairie stables would soon disappear and be replaced by handsome residences, commodious barns, and granaries.

By January 1902, Elk City had more than sixty businesses and a population exceeding 1,000. Paving the streets with bricks also began in 1902. Though not yet a year old, the town had become one of the largest in western Oklahoma. Even with two devastating fires (one on October 28, 1903, which destroyed more than a dozen businesses, and the other in March 1906 which burned sixteen businesses to the ground), Elk City continued to grow into a major transportation and commercial hub, and by statehood in 1907, the population had more than tripled to 3,000 people. The prairie community had become a boomtown.

== Geography ==
Elk City is located in northeastern Beckham County.

According to the United States Census Bureau, the city has a total area of 16.4 square miles (42.5 km^{2}), of which 16.2 square miles (41.9 km^{2}) is land and 0.23 square miles (0.6 km^{2}), or 1.37%, is water.

=== Climate ===
According to the Köppen Climate Classification system, Elk City has a humid subtropical climate, abbreviated "Cfa" on climate maps. The hottest temperature recorded in Elk City was 114 °F (45.6 °C) on July 19, 2022, while the coldest temperature recorded was −12 °F (−24.4 °C) on January 17, 1930, and January 19, 1984.

Climate data for Elk City, Oklahoma, 1991–2020 normals, extremes 1904–present
Month	Jan	Feb	Mar	Apr	May	Jun	Jul	Aug	Sep	Oct	Nov	Dec	Year
Record high °F (°C)	84 (29)	95 (35)	98 (37)	100 (38)	106 (41)	111 (44)	114 (46)	113 (45)	108 (42)	103 (39)	90 (32)	88 (31)	114 (46)
Mean maximum °F (°C)	73.0 (22.8)	78.2 (25.7)	85.4 (29.7)	88.8 (31.6)	94.2 (34.6)	97.7 (36.5)	103.1 (39.5)	101.9 (38.8)	96.2 (35.7)	90.7 (32.6)	80.3 (26.8)	72.0 (22.2)	103.9 (39.9)
Mean daily maximum °F (°C)	50.4 (10.2)	54.5 (12.5)	63.9 (17.7)	72.3 (22.4)	80.5 (26.9)	89.2 (31.8)	94.7 (34.8)	93.6 (34.2)	85.4 (29.7)	74.0 (23.3)	61.4 (16.3)	51.2 (10.7)	72.6 (22.5)
Daily mean °F (°C)	38.2 (3.4)	41.8 (5.4)	50.6 (10.3)	59.0 (15.0)	68.4 (20.2)	77.3 (25.2)	82.1 (27.8)	80.9 (27.2)	73.0 (22.8)	61.0 (16.1)	49.1 (9.5)	39.8 (4.3)	60.1 (15.6)
Mean daily minimum °F (°C)	26.1 (−3.3)	29.0 (−1.7)	37.4 (3.0)	45.6 (7.6)	56.3 (13.5)	65.3 (18.5)	69.6 (20.9)	68.3 (20.2)	60.7 (15.9)	48.1 (8.9)	36.8 (2.7)	28.5 (−1.9)	47.6 (8.7)
Mean minimum °F (°C)	11.0 (−11.7)	14.6 (−9.7)	19.9 (−6.7)	31.0 (−0.6)	42.0 (5.6)	54.5 (12.5)	61.2 (16.2)	59.6 (15.3)	46.7 (8.2)	31.4 (−0.3)	19.7 (−6.8)	13.3 (−10.4)	7.2 (−13.8)
Record low °F (°C)	−12 (−24)	−8 (−22)	−3 (−19)	19 (−7)	31 (−1)	42 (6)	50 (10)	45 (7)	28 (−2)	17 (−8)	9 (−13)	−9 (−23)	−12 (−24)
Average precipitation inches (mm)	0.88 (22)	1.00 (25)	2.10 (53)	2.74 (70)	4.45 (113)	3.77 (96)	2.48 (63)	3.70 (94)	2.80 (71)	2.90 (74)	1.42 (36)	1.28 (33)	29.52 (750)
Average snowfall inches (cm)	2.7 (6.9)	2.2 (5.6)	0.7 (1.8)	0.0 (0.0)	0.0 (0.0)	0.0 (0.0)	0.0 (0.0)	0.0 (0.0)	0.0 (0.0)	0.1 (0.25)	0.5 (1.3)	2.4 (6.1)	8.6 (21.95)
Average extreme snow depth inches (cm)	2.1 (5.3)	0.9 (2.3)	0.7 (1.8)	0.0 (0.0)	0.0 (0.0)	0.0 (0.0)	0.0 (0.0)	0.0 (0.0)	0.0 (0.0)	0.0 (0.0)	0.6 (1.5)	2.3 (5.8)	3.2 (8.1)
Average precipitation days (≥ 0.01 in)	4.3	3.9	6.2	6.3	8.7	8.7	5.9	7.6	6.6	6.7	5.0	4.7	74.6
Average snowy days (≥ 0.1 in)	1.5	1.2	0.5	0.1	0.0	0.0	0.0	0.0	0.0	0.1	0.2	1.7	5.3
Source 1: NOAA
Source 2: National Weather Service

== Demographics ==
Historical population
Census	Pop.	Note	%±
1910	3,165		—
1920	2,814		−11.1%
1930	5,666		101.4%
1940	5,029		−11.2%
1950	7,963		58.3%
1960	8,196		2.9%
1970	7,323		−10.7%
1980	9,569		30.7%
1990	10,428		9.0%
2000	10,510		0.8%
2010	11,693		11.3%
2020	11,561		−1.1%
U.S. Decennial Census

=== 2020 census ===
As of the 2020 census, Elk City had a population of 11,561. The median age was 35.0 years. 27.5% of residents were under the age of 18 and 16.3% of residents were 65 years of age or older. For every 100 females there were 96.4 males, and for every 100 females age 18 and over there were 93.8 males age 18 and over.

95.8% of residents lived in urban areas, while 4.2% lived in rural areas.

There were 4,624 households in Elk City, of which 34.9% had children under the age of 18 living in them. Of all households, 44.7% were married-couple households, 19.9% were households with a male householder and no spouse or partner present, and 27.2% were households with a female householder and no spouse or partner present. About 30.3% of all households were made up of individuals and 13.9% had someone living alone who was 65 years of age or older.

There were 5,912 housing units, of which 21.8% were vacant. Among occupied housing units, 61.2% were owner-occupied and 38.8% were renter-occupied. The homeowner vacancy rate was 3.5% and the rental vacancy rate was 28.6%.

Racial composition as of the 2020 census
Race	Percent
White	77.9%
Black or African American	2.6%
American Indian and Alaska Native	3.5%
Asian	0.8%
Native Hawaiian and Other Pacific Islander	0.1%
Some other race	5.4%
Two or more races	9.7%
Hispanic or Latino (of any race)	14.0%

=== 2010 census ===
As of the 2010 census, there were 11,693 people living in the city. The population density was 718.8 inhabitants per square mile (277.5/km^{2}). There were 4,973 housing units at an average density of 340.1 per square mile (131.3/km^{2}). The racial makeup of the city was 88.95% White, 3.06% African American, 3.02% Native American, 0.54% Asian, 0.03% Pacific Islander, 2.25% from other races, and 2.15% from two or more races. Hispanic or Latino of any race were 5.96% of the population. The median income for a household in the city was $28,268, and the median income for a family was $35,383. About 15.4% of families and 19.1% of the population were below the poverty line, including 27.2% of those under age 18 and 5.0% of those age 65 or over.

== Economy ==
Elk City is the principal center of trade for Western Oklahoma and part of the Texas Panhandle, with a 60-mile (97 km) trade radius that serves more than 50,000 people. Petroleum, agriculture, wind energy, transportation, tourism, manufacturing, and healthcare all contribute to Elk City's economy.

Since the 2000 census, Elk City has had a nearly 3% growth in jobs. Over the next decade, the number of jobs available in Elk City is expected to skyrocket by about 42%.

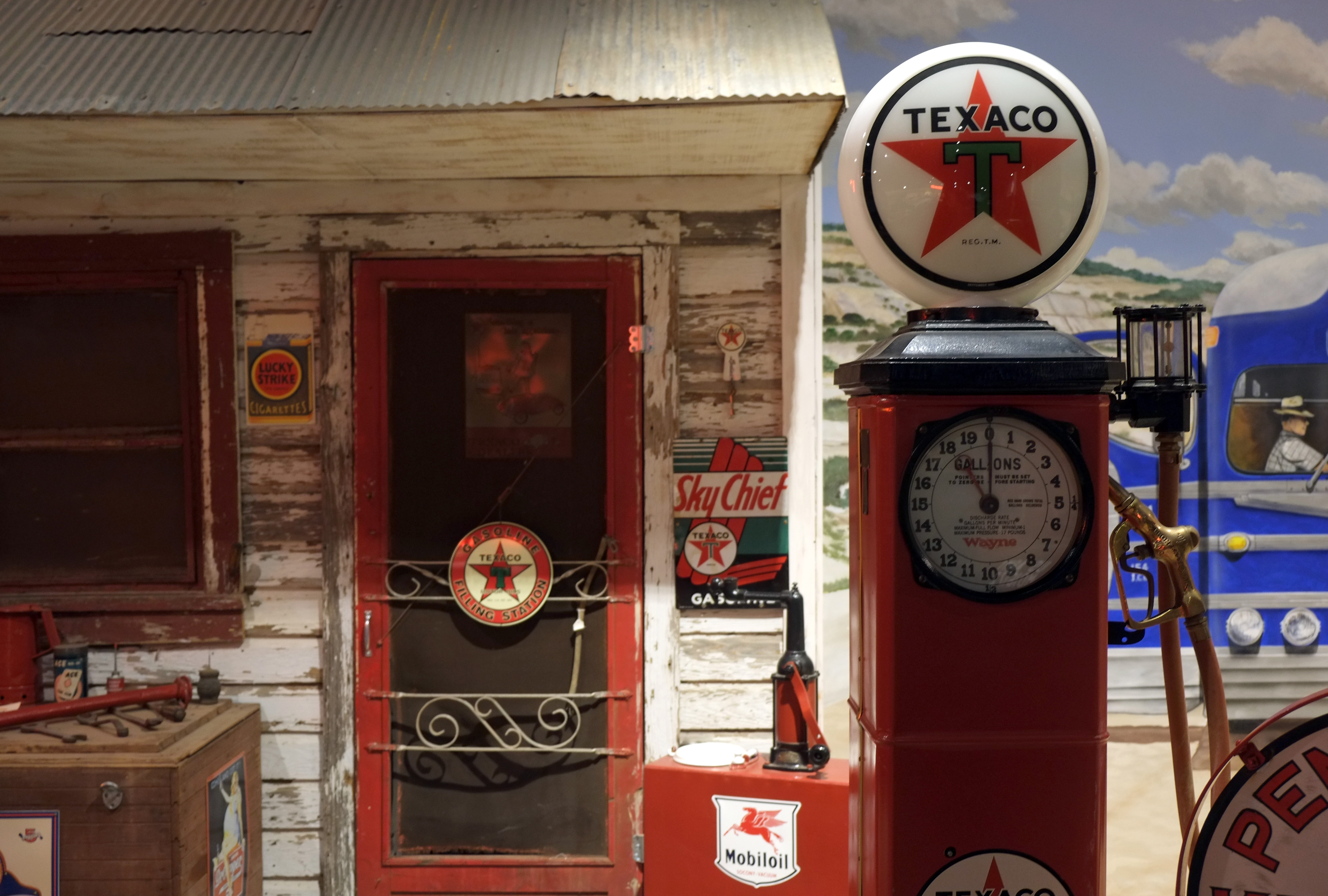
Oil industry display at the Route 66 museum in Elk City

Since Elk City lies in a rich oil and natural-gas area on the shelf of Oklahoma's Anadarko Basin, the petroleum industry is the heart of the city's economy. Because of this, the city is the self-proclaimed "Natural Gas Capital of the World", complete with Parker Drilling Rig #114, located downtown. The rig dominates the Elk City skyline, and at 180 feet (55 m) in height, is the world's tallest, non-operating oil rig. Elk City has enjoyed significant growth due to the opening and location of oil field services and drilling companies in the city. The petroleum geologist Gustavus "Gus" E. Archie, known for Archie's law, played an important role in establishing the Elk City oil and natural gas field.

Agriculture doesn't play as prominent of a role as it did in the 20th century, with the only remaining viable agricultural market being the livestock auction. Nevertheless, Elk City still serves as a vital retail center for farmers and ranchers in the area.

In early 2009, Acciona Energy commissioned the first local wind farm, the Red Hills Wind Farm, located approximately 8 miles (13 km) north of Elk City. The Red Hills Wind Farm includes 82 wind turbine generators that produce 123 MW of clean energy, enough to power more than 40,000 homes.

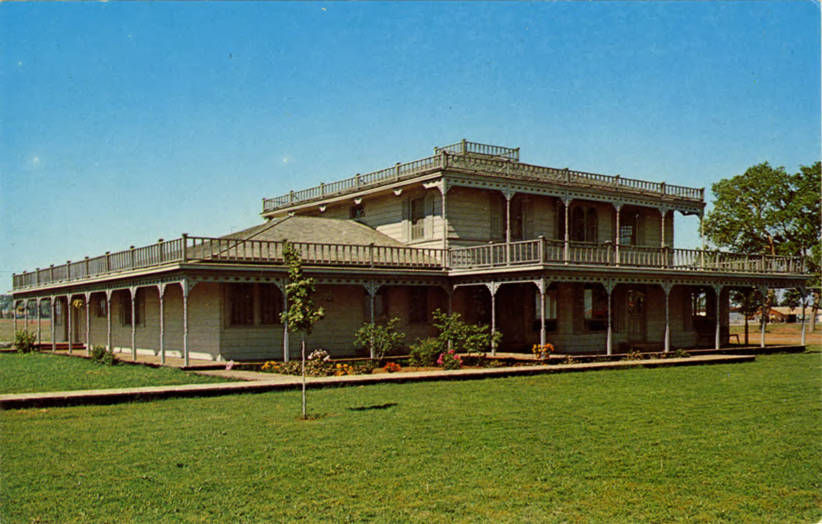
Elk City Old Town Museum

Transportation has played an important part in Elk City's economy throughout its history, beginning with the building of the famed U.S. Route 66 through the heart of the city in the early 1930s. Today, Interstate 40 serves the city, with 60,000 consumers traveling through Elk City each day, and connects with Oklahoma City to the east and Amarillo, Texas, to the west. The city is also served by Oklahoma State Highway 6, which connects Elk City with Altus to the south, and Oklahoma State Highway 34, connecting Elk City with Woodward to the north. The Elk City Regional Business Airport is located in the northeast part of the city, 1.5 miles (2.4 km) from the Interstate.

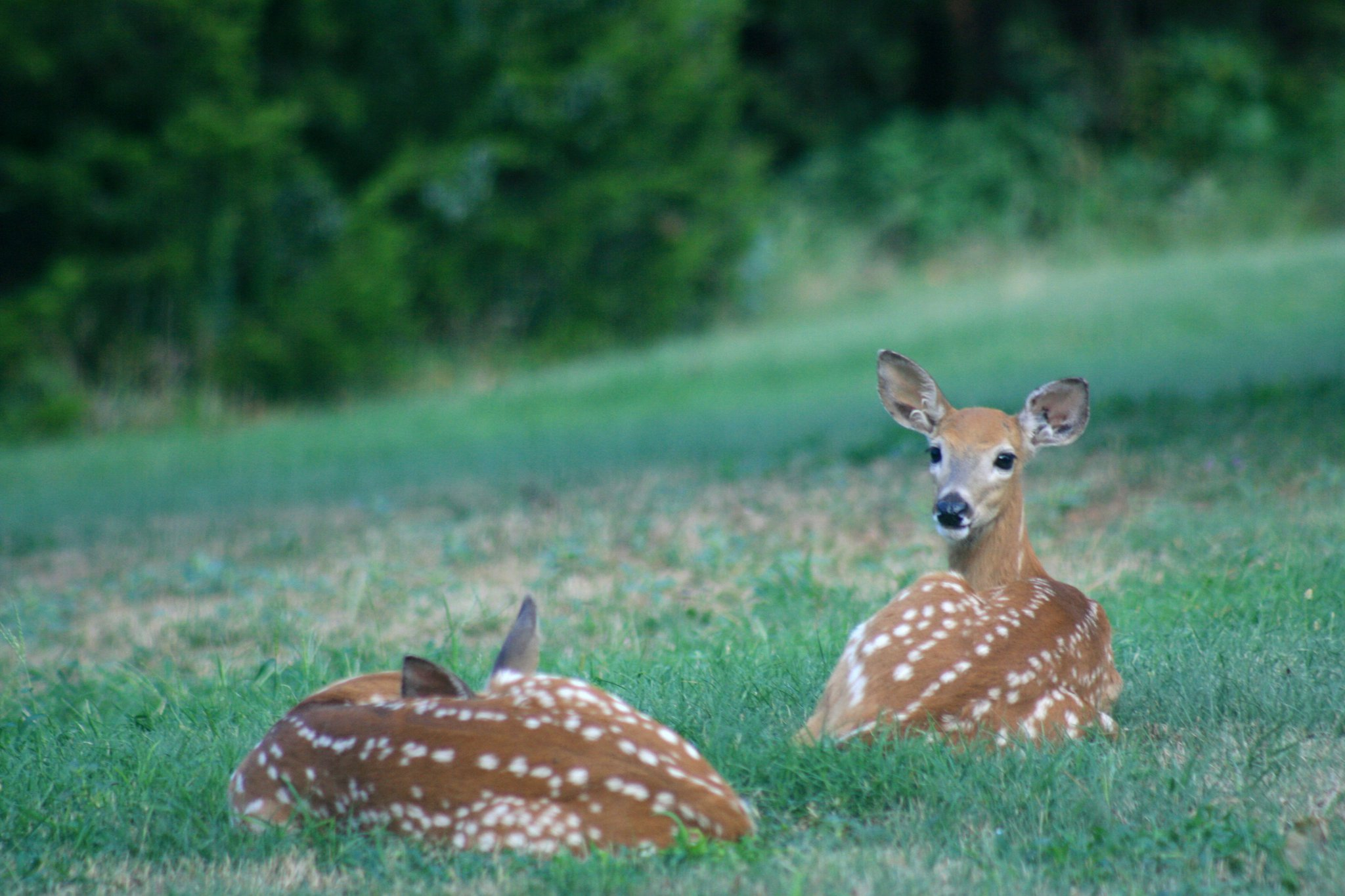
Fawns at the Washita National Wildlife Refuge

Given that Historic U.S. Route 66 runs through Elk City, a sprawling museum complex has developed, which includes the National Route 66 Museum, the Old Town Museum, the Transportation Museum, the Farm and Ranch Museum, and the Blacksmith Museum. Each museum is housed in separate buildings, which altogether depict a mockup of early Elk City, complete with general stores, bank, a railroad depot and train caboose, opera house, and other buildings. Elk City is also in close proximity to many other attractions in Western Oklahoma, including Foss State Park, Foss Reservoir, the Washita National Wildlife Refuge, Black Kettle National Grassland, the Wichita Mountains, the Antelope Hills, the Quartz Mountains, and the Washita Battlefield National Historic Site.

Bar-S Foods Company operates a packaged-meat warehouse and distribution center in Elk City.

Great Plains Regional Medical Center is Elk City's largest employer and serves Western Oklahoma and the eastern Texas Panhandle. The hospital has been named by OKCBusiness and Best Companies Group as one of the "Thirty Best Places to Work in Oklahoma" for three consecutive years: 2006, 2007, and 2008. On May 11, 2007, construction began on a new, $60 million, 151,030-square-foot (14,031 m^{2}) hospital that opened in July 2009.

In June 2009, it was announced that a Walmart Supercenter would be constructed, bringing at least 150 jobs to the city. Soon afterward, a $2.2 million federal grant was provided through the American Recovery and Reinvestment Act of 2009 to help fund the project and bring more jobs to Elk City. It opened in October 2010 off I-40 at Exit 40. Featuring 180,000-square-foot (17,000 m^{2}) area, it is the largest store between Amarillo and Oklahoma City.

== Education ==
Three school districts include section of Elk City, with the former covering more of Elk City:

- Elk City Public Schools
- Merritt Public Schools
- Sayre Public Schools

Elk City Public Schools and Merritt Public Schools are members of the Western Technology Center District. WTC provides the opportunity for adults and high school students to get occupationally-specific training. As a member of the WTC district, high school juniors and seniors living in the Elk City School District and Merritt School District have the opportunity to attend classes at WTC. High school students who are residents of the WTC District can enroll in WTC full-time training on a tuition-free basis.

== Media ==
=== Newspaper ===
- Elk City Daily News

=== Radio ===
- KECO 96.5 FM (Country)
- KKZU 95.5 FM (Classic Rock)
- KOOL 94.3 FM (Classic Hits)
- KADS 1240 AM (Sports Talk)

== Transportation ==
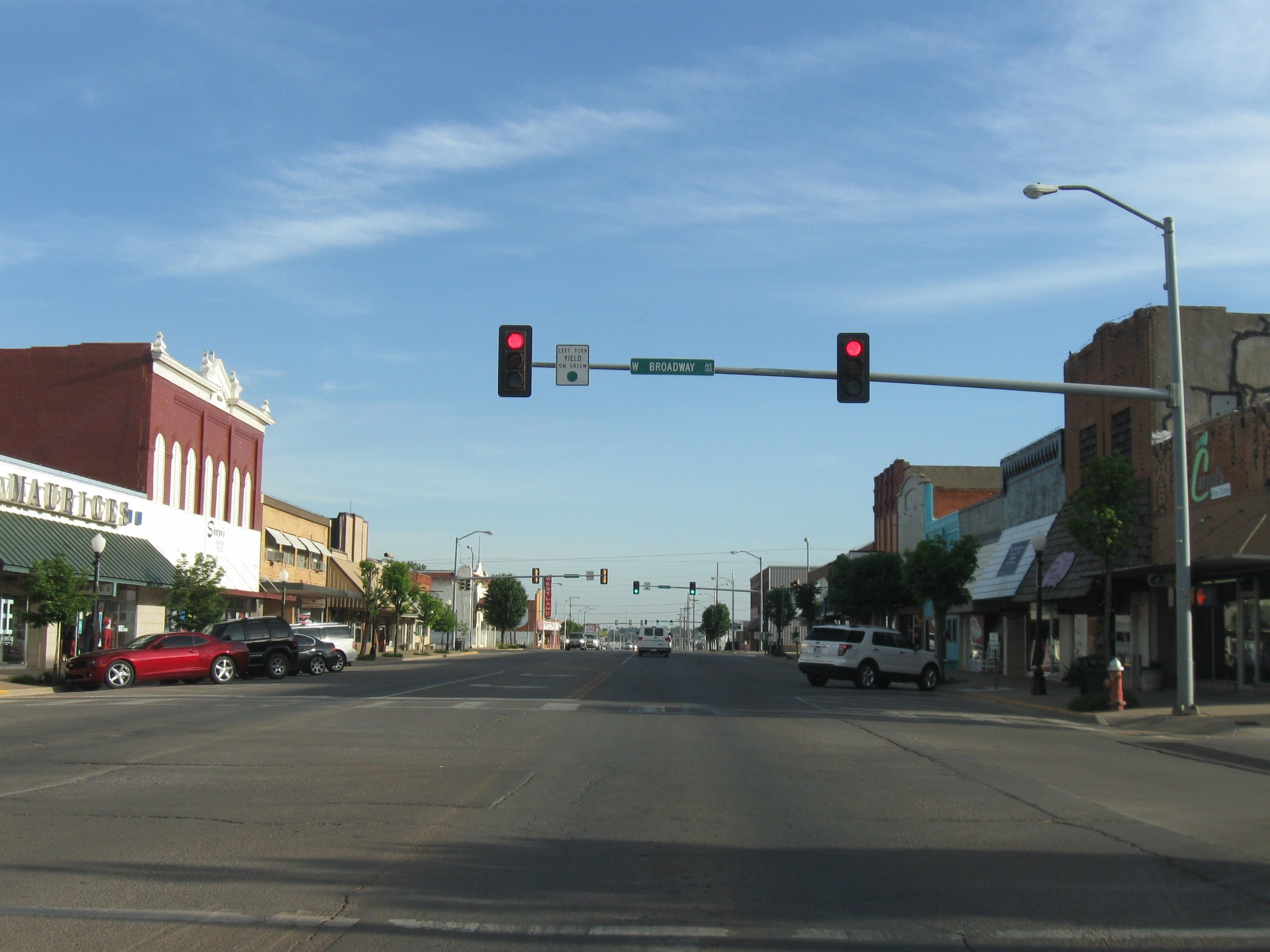
SH-6 in downtown Elk City

Intercity bus service is provided by Greyhound Lines.

Elk City Regional Business Airport (KELK; FAA ID: ELK), 1 mile northeast, has a 5399’ x 75’ paved runway.

Commercial air transportation is available at Will Rogers World Airport, about 112 miles east, or Rick Husband Amarillo International Airport, about 140 miles west.

Rail freight service is available from Farmrail Corporation.

== Attractions ==
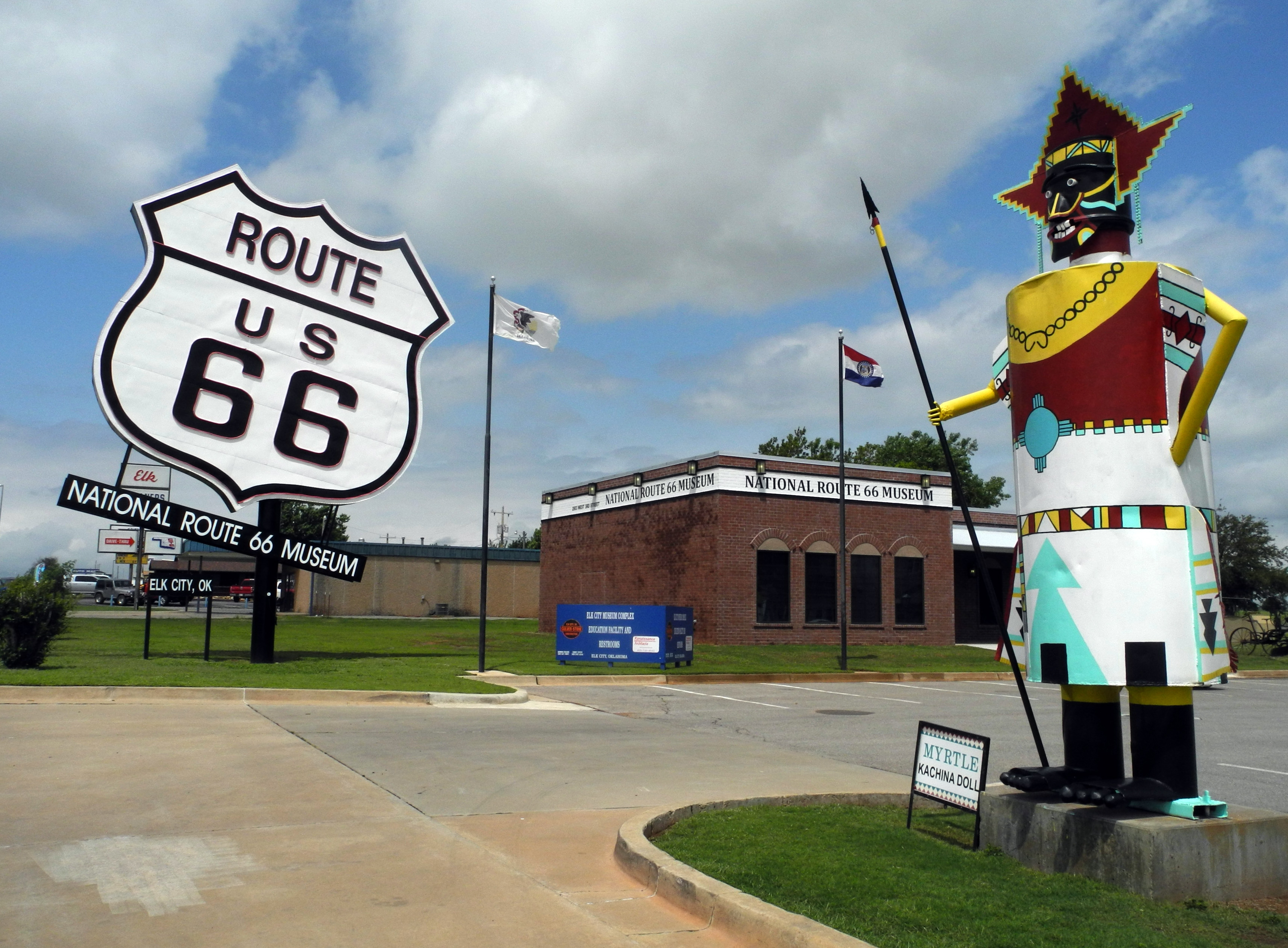
National Route 66 Museum

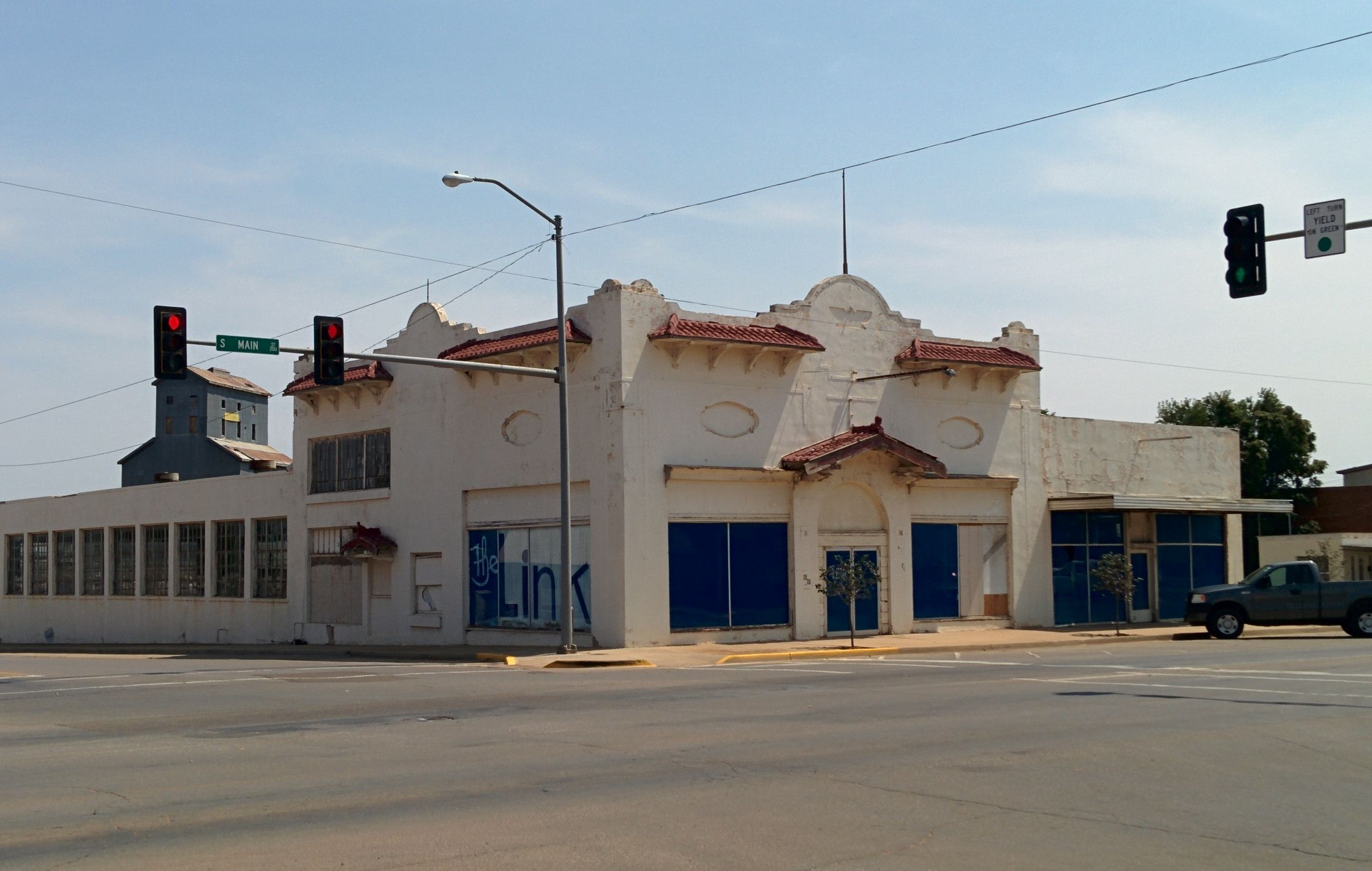
Hedlund Motor Company Building

=== National Register of Historic Places ===
- Casa Grande Hotel
- Hedlund Motor Company Building
- Storm House
- Whited Grist Mill

=== Stops on Route 66 ===
- National Route 66 Museum Complex

=== Museums ===
- Elk City features five museums: the Old Town Museum, the National Route 66 Museum, the National Transportation Museum, the Farm and Ranch Museum, and the Blacksmith Museum. Another museum, the Anadarko Basin Museum of Natural History, is currently closed due to lack of funding.

== Notable people ==
- Cade Davis, European basketball player
- Keitha Dickerson, basketball player, Texas Tech and WNBA
- Richard Hart, jazz guitarist
- Justin McBride, PBR world champion bull rider
- Scott Meacham, State Treasurer of Oklahoma (2005–2011)
- Kelli O'Hara, award-winning Broadway actress, singer, and songwriter
- Susan Powell, Miss America 1981, actress, and singer
- Joe Spencer, NFL player
- Jimmy Webb, Grammy Award-winning songwriter
