= KWEY-FM =

Radio station in Clinton, Oklahoma

- Clinton, Oklahoma; United States
- Broadcast area: Elk City, Oklahoma; Weatherford, Oklahoma
- Frequency: 95.5 MHz (HD Radio)
- Branding: Coyote Country

Programming
- Format: Country
- Subchannels: HD2: Classic country; HD3: Classic rock; HD4: Sports
- Affiliations: Premiere Networks; United Stations Radio Networks

Ownership
- Owner: Wright Broadcasting Systems, Inc.
- Sister stations: KKZU, KCLI-FM, KCLI

History
- First air date: 1978

Technical information
- Licensing authority: FCC
- Facility ID: 12048
- Class: C2
- ERP: 18,500 watts
- HAAT: 252.4 meters (828 ft)
- Transmitter coordinates: 35.44528°N 98.98861°W

Links
- Public license information: Public file; LMS
- Webcast: Listen live
- Website: kwey.com

KWEY-FM (95.5 FM) is a radio station licensed to Clinton, Oklahoma. The station broadcasts a country music format and is owned by Wright Broadcasting Systems, Inc. KWEY also airs a sports radio format on its HD4 channel and on its 1320 AM signal.

== Translators ==
Call sign	Frequency	City of license	FID	ERP (W)	HAAT	Class	FCC info
K262CW	100.3 FM	Weatherford, Oklahoma	122163	250	60 m (197 ft)	D	LMS
