= KKZU =

- Sayre, Oklahoma; United States
- Broadcast area: Elk City, Oklahoma
- Frequency: 101.7 MHz
- Branding: 101.7 The Zoo

Programming
- Format: Classic rock

Ownership
- Owner: Wright Broadcasting Systems, Inc.
- Sister stations: KWEY-FM, KCLI-FM, KCLI

History
- First air date: 2010
- Call sign meaning: "Zoo"

Technical information
- Licensing authority: FCC
- Facility ID: 171021
- Class: C2
- ERP: 50,000 watts
- HAAT: 150 meters (490 ft)
- Transmitter coordinates: 35°22′13″N 99°37′40″W

Links
- Public license information: Public file; LMS
- Webcast: Listen live
- Website: kkzufm.com

KKZU (101.7 FM, "The Zoo") is a radio station licensed to Sayre, Oklahoma. The station broadcasts a classic rock format and is owned by Wright Broadcasting Systems, Inc.
