= Spring Creek Lake =

Spring Creek Lake may refer to:

- Spring Creek Lake located in Goodhue County, Minnesota
- Spring Creek Lake located in Roger Mills County, Oklahoma
