= Wendigo Creek =

Former watercourse in Toronto, Canada

Coordinates: 43.65166°N 79.46947°W

Wendigo Creek

Wendigo Creek was a short watercourse in Toronto, Ontario, that drained into Grenadier Pond. It was spring fed, like nearby Spring Creek (Grenadier Pond). Its headwaters were north of Bloor Street, near Dundas Street and Laws Street.

Tributaries joined the main channel at Clendenan Street and Glendonwynne Street, north of High Park.

The creek's steeply sloped ravine was 15 metres (49 ft) deep where it crossed Bloor, until that portion was filled in, in 1915. A conduit carried the creek under the embankment.

Currently, storm sewers empty into channelized open remnant of the creek, south of Bloor, in the north end of High Park.

Sediment washed down the creek, formed a sandbar, at the outlet of Grenadier Pond, sealing it off, as a separate pond.

A follower of John Harvey Kellogg, William McCormick, and his wife, both medical doctors, built a sanatorium at 32 Gothic Avenue, along the creek's banks, in 1905. The pair built "mineral baths", claiming the spring-fed creek had special health benefits. When the McCormicks shut down the sanatorium the mineral baths were turned into official city swimming pools.
