= Spring Creek (Shoal Creek tributary) =

Stream in the US state of Missouri

Spring Creek is a stream in northwestern Newton County, Missouri. It is a tributary of Shoal Creek.

The headwaters are located west of Spring City at 36°59′24″N 94°32′53″W. The stream flows northeast passing under and running along Missouri Route 86. The stream confluence is at Redings Mill at 37°01′23″N 94°31′03″W.

Spring Creek was so named for the fact it is fed by a spring in its headwaters.

== See also ==
- List of rivers of Missouri
