= KCLI (AM) =

- Clinton, Oklahoma; United States
- Frequency: 1320 kHz C-QUAM AM Stereo

Programming
- Format: Sports

Ownership
- Owner: Wright Broadcasting Systems, Inc.
- Sister stations: KWEY-FM, KKZU, KCLI-FM

History
- First air date: April 15, 1949 (as KWOE)
- Former call signs: KWOE (1949–1980); KKCC (1980–1985); KXOL (1985–1996)
- Call sign meaning: CLInton

Technical information
- Licensing authority: FCC
- Facility ID: 14763
- Class: D
- Power: 1,000 watts day 108 watts night
- Transmitter coordinates: 35°29′0″N 98°58′54″W
- Translator: 97.3 K247CO (Clinton)
- Repeater: 95.5-4 KWEY-FM-HD4 (Clinton)

Links
- Public license information: Public file; LMS
- Webcast: Listen Live
- Website: kcliam.com

KCLI (1320 AM) is a radio station licensed to Clinton, Oklahoma, United States. The station is currently owned by Wright Broadcasting Systems, Inc.

== History ==
The station was assigned the call letters KKCC on April 14, 1980. On November 27, 1985, the station changed its call sign to KXOL and on August 5, 1996 to the current KCLI.

== Translators ==
Broadcast translator for KCLI
Call sign	Frequency	City of license	FID	ERP (W)	HAAT	Class	FCC info
K247CO	97.3 FM	Clinton, Oklahoma	147619	250	107 m (351 ft)	D	LMS
