= Spring Creek (Stoddard County, Missouri) =

Stream in the US state of Missouri

Coordinates: 36°47′27″N 90°03′51″W

Spring Creek is a stream in Stoddard County in the U.S. state of Missouri. It is a tributary of Lick Creek.

The stream headwaters arise in the relatively high extension of Crowley's Ridge area approximately one mile north of US Route 60 and the city of Dexter.

Spring Creek was named for the fact it was fed by springs on its upper course.

== See also ==
- List of rivers of Missouri
