= KXOO =

- Elk City, Oklahoma; United States
- Frequency: 94.3 MHz
- Branding: Kool 94.3

Programming
- Format: Classic hits

Ownership
- Owner: Paragon Communications, Inc.

History
- First air date: 1995
- Former call signs: KAGK (1993–1994, CP); KZRU (1994–1995, CP)

Technical information
- Licensing authority: FCC
- Facility ID: 51563
- Class: C3
- ERP: 12,000 watts
- HAAT: 143 meters (469 ft)
- Transmitter coordinates: 35°24′09.9″N 99°29′51.9″W

Links
- Public license information: Public file; LMS
- Webcast: Listen live
- Website: kool94.com

KXOO is a radio station airing a classic hits format licensed to Elk City, Oklahoma, broadcasting on 94.3 FM. The station is owned by Paragon Communications, Inc.

== History ==
Prior to March 1, 2015, the station aired a Contemporary Christian music format and was known as The Rock.

Station's previous logo
