= Spring Creek (Victoria County, Texas) =

- Location within Texas Location within the United States

Physical characteristics
- Source
  - coordinates: 29.0049809°N 97.0991544°W
- Mouth
  - coordinates: 28.8291552°N 97.0185983°W

Spring Creek is a stream in Victoria County, Texas, in the United States.

Spring Creek was named from its source at a clear spring. A 1970 newspaper article reports the stream's waters had been since muddied by industrial pollution.

== See also ==
- List of rivers of Texas
