= KADS =

Radio station in Elk City, Oklahoma

- Elk City, Oklahoma; United States
- Frequency: 1240 kHz
- Branding: The Sports Animal

Programming
- Format: Sports

Ownership
- Owner: Paragon Communications, Inc.

History
- First air date: 1932

Technical information
- Licensing authority: FCC
- Facility ID: 29030
- Class: C
- Power: 1,000 watts (unlimited)
- Transmitter coordinates: 35°22′51″N 99°24′25″W
- Translator: 98.1 K251CN (Elk City)

Links
- Public license information: Public file; LMS
- Webcast: Listen Live
- Website: kadsam.com

KADS (1240 AM, "The Sports Animal") is a radio station licensed to serve Elk City, Oklahoma, United States. The station, established in 1929, is currently owned by Paragon Communications, Inc.

KADS broadcasts a sports format, largely as a simulcast of WWLS-FM (98.1 FM) in Oklahoma City, Oklahoma.

The station was assigned the KADS call sign by the Federal Communications Commission.

== Translators ==
Broadcast translator for KADS
Call sign	Frequency	City of license	FID	ERP (W)	HAAT	Class	FCC info
K251CN	98.1 FM	Elk City, Oklahoma	200877	250	175 m (574 ft)	D	LMS
