= Spring Creek Township, Custer County, Nebraska =

Spring Creek Township
- Township
- Location in Custer County
- Coordinates: 41°28′24″N 099°16′43″W
- Country: United States
- State: Nebraska
- County: Custer

Area
  - Total: 31.09 sq mi (80.51 km^{2})
  - Land: 31.09 sq mi (80.51 km^{2})
  - Water: 0 sq mi (0 km^{2}) 0%
- Elevation: 2,320 ft (707 m)

Population (2020)
  - Total: 15
  - Density: 0.48/sq mi (0.19/km^{2})
- ZIP code: 68828
- Area code: 308
- GNIS feature ID: 0838266

Spring Creek Township is one of thirty-one townships in Custer County, Nebraska, United States. The population was 15 at the 2020 census. A 2021 estimate placed the township's population at 15.

== See also ==
- County government in Nebraska
