= Cobb Creek (Oklahoma) =

Location
- Country: United States

Physical characteristics
- Source
  - location: Southeast of Clinton, Oklahoma
- Mouth
  - location: Southeast of Fort Cobb, Oklahoma
  - coordinates: 35°05′27″N 98°25′39″W

Cobb Creek, also known as Pond Creek, is a watercourse in Washita and Caddo counties in Oklahoma. It originates in Washita County just south of the Custer-Washita county line (E1070 Rd), being south of Weatherford, Oklahoma. It flows generally south-southeast, feeding into the 157-acre Crowder Lake, also known as the Cobb Creek Watershed Dam No. 1. It continues below the lake, passing through Colony, Oklahoma, after which it turns more southeasterly and crosses into Caddo County. It joins Fort Cobb Lake from the west. Cobb Creek continues south-southeast below that lake, and ends when it becomes a tributary of the Washita River just southeast of Fort Cobb, Oklahoma.

The creek is a perennial stream maintained by discharge from the Rush Springs Aquifer. Flooding frequently happened in the Cobb Creek watershed: from 1923 to 1942 there were 13 major floods and 67 smaller floods. Twelve dams have since been constructed throughout the watershed to control this problem.

Tributaries include:

- Bull Creek
- Spring Creek
- Buck Creek
- Fivemile Creek
- Crooked Creek
- Camp Creek
- Lake Creek (Fort Cobb Lake tributary from the north)
- Willow Creek (Fort Cobb Lake tributary from the northeast)
- Punjo Creek
