= KCLI-FM =

- Cordell, Oklahoma; United States
- Frequency: 99.3 MHz
- Branding: Newstalk 99.3 FM

Programming
- Format: News/Talk

Ownership
- Owner: Wright Broadcasting Systems, Inc.
- Sister stations: KWEY-FM, KKZU, KCLI

History
- First air date: 1985
- Former call signs: KBOG (1985–1988); KRMK (1988–1991); KCDL (1991–2010)

Technical information
- Licensing authority: FCC
- Facility ID: 60813
- Class: C3
- ERP: 4,400 watts
- HAAT: 240.2 meters (788 ft)
- Transmitter coordinates: 35°26′43″N 98°59′19″W

Links
- Public license information: Public file; LMS
- Webcast: https://radio.securenetsystems.net/cirrusencore/index.cfm?stationCallSign=KCLI
- Website: kclifm.com

KCLI-FM (99.3 FM) is a radio station broadcasting a news/talk format. Licensed to Cordell, Oklahoma, United States, the station is currently owned by Wright Broadcasting Systems, Inc.

== History ==
The station was assigned the call letters KBOG on October 30, 1985. On October 14, 1988, the station changed its call sign to KRMK, on July 22, 1991, to KCDL, and on September 21, 2010, to the current KCLI-FM. James "Max" Ray Maxey, Jr. used to own this station as Media Max Promotions and he was born on October 10, 1952, in Oklahoma City and died on March 6, 2016, in Oklahoma City, OK.
