= Spring Creek Lake (Oklahoma) =

- Location: Roger Mills County, Oklahoma
- Coordinates: 35°46′25″N 99°50′12″W
- Type: Lake
- Part of: Cibola National Forest
- River sources: Spring Creek
- Managing agency: United States Forest Service
- Surface area: 60 acres (24 ha)

Spring Creek Lake is located on Spring Creek in Roger Mills County about 14 miles north of Cheyenne on US Route 283 and 8 miles west on SH-33, in the State of Oklahoma. It is inside the Black Kettle National Grassland, which is managed by the Cibola National Forest. It is 60 acres in size.

The lake offers a variety of fish including striped bass, white bass, smallmouth bass, catfish, largemouth bass and flathead catfish. It is a "no wake" lake with an established 5 mph speed limit, and a dirt boat launching ramp is provided.

The associated recreation area has dispersed camping sites, a picnic area, nature viewing, restroom facilities, two covered picnic sites and paved roads.

== Spring Creek ==
The Spring Creek that feeds this lake originates north of the lake and just south of Oklahoma State Highway 33, at a point southwest of Crawford, Oklahoma in Roger Mills County. After flowing south and being impounded by the lake, the creek continues generally south in Roger Mills to become a tributary of the Washita River. This creek is not to be confused with at least five other creeks in Oklahoma with the “Spring Creek” name, nor with numerous other watercourses named Spring Creek in other states and countries.
