= Foss State Park =

State park in Oklahoma, United States

- Foss State Park in 2022

- Location within Oklahoma
- Location: Custer County, Oklahoma, United States
- Nearest city: Foss, OK
- Coordinates: 35.5667154°N 99.2198148°W
- Area: 1,749 acres (708 ha)
- Visitors: 311,619 (in 2021)
- Governing body: Oklahoma Tourism and Recreation Department
- Website: www.travelok.com/listings/view.profile/id.2848

Foss State Park is a 1,749-acre (708 ha) Oklahoma state park located on Foss Lake, in southwestern Custer County, Oklahoma, near the city of Foss.

Recreational activities include hiking, biking, horseback riding, fishing, boating, swimming and camping. Facilities include 110 RV campsites, 10 of which have full-hookups and 100 that are semi-modern. All sites are paved and offer 30 amp or 50 amp service plus water. Big rig sites, shaded sites and 35 tent sites are also available. Foss State Park has an equestrian camp with a multi-purpose trail for horseback riding, hiking and mountain biking. Horse rental is not available. The park also features picnic areas, group picnic shelters, grills, fire rings, comfort stations with showers, lighted boat ramps, boat storage, boat rentals, playgrounds, swimming beach and a seasonal marina.

== Fees ==
To help fund a backlog of deferred maintenance and park improvements, the state implemented an entrance fee for this park and 21 others effective June 15, 2020. The fees, charged per vehicle, start at $10 per day for a single-day or $8 for residents with an Oklahoma license plate or Oklahoma tribal plate. Fees are waived for honorably discharged veterans and Oklahoma residents age 62 & older and their spouses. Passes good for three days or a week are also available; annual passes good at all 22 state parks charging fees are offered at a cost of $75 for out-of-state visitors or $60 for Oklahoma residents. The 22 parks are:

- Arrowhead Area at Lake Eufaula State Park
- Beavers Bend State Park
- Boiling Springs State Park
- Cherokee Landing State Park
- Fort Cobb State Park
- Foss State Park
- Honey Creek Area at Grand Lake State Park
- Great Plains State Park
- Great Salt Plains State Park
- Greenleaf State Park
- Keystone State Park
- Lake Eufaula State Park
- Lake Murray State Park
- Lake Texoma State Park
- Lake Thunderbird State Park
- Lake Wister State Park
- Natural Falls State Park
- Osage Hills State Park
- Robbers Cave State Park
- Sequoyah State Park
- Tenkiller State Park
- Twin Bridges Area at Grand Lake State Park

== Foss Reservoir and dam ==
Foss Reservoir was created by the United States Bureau of Reclamation in 1961 by impounding the Washita River. The dam is 142 feet (43 m) high. The reservoir, with a capacity of 436,812 acre-feet and a surface area of 13,141 acres (5,318 ha), provides regulation of river flows and municipal supplies for the nearby cities of Clinton, Cordell, Hobart, Butler, and Bessie. Water is conveyed from the reservoir to the project cities through 50 miles (80 km) of aqueducts and laterals.
