= Foss Reservoir =

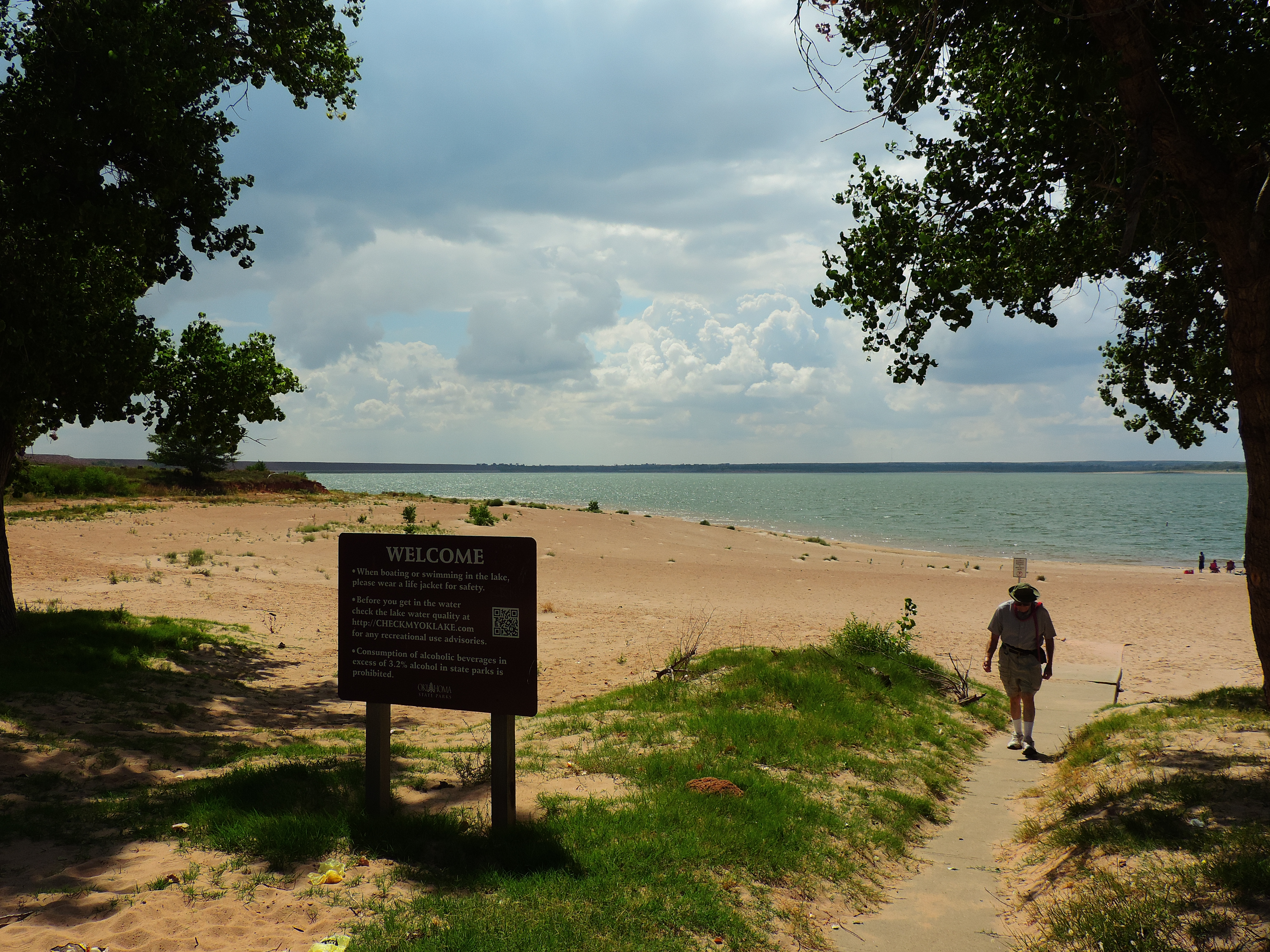
- Foss Lake Beach

- Location within Oklahoma Location within the United States
- Location: Custer County, Oklahoma
- Coordinates: 35°34′05″N 99°13′19″W
- Type: Reservoir
- Primary inflows: Washita River
- Primary outflows: Washita River
- Catchment area: 1,496 square miles (3,870 km^{2})
- Basin countries: United States
- Managing agency: U.S. Bureau of Reclamation
- Built: October 1958
- First flooded: October 1962
- Max. length: 10.91 mi (17.56 km)
- Max. width: 2 mi (3.2 km)
- Surface area: 8,800 acres (3,600 ha)
- Average depth: 23 feet (7.0 m)
- Max. depth: 89 feet (27 m)
- Water volume: 256,220 acre⋅ft (316,040,000 m^{3})(flood capacity)
- Shore length^{1}: 63 mi (101 km)
- Surface elevation: 1,652 ft (504 m)
- Islands: several islets
- Settlements: Foss, Oklahoma; Clinton, Oklahoma
- ^{1} Shore length is not a well-defined measure.

Foss Reservoir, also known as Foss Lake, is in Custer County, Oklahoma on the Washita River, about 15 miles (24 km) west of Clinton, Oklahoma. The reservoir was constructed during 1958–1961 by the U. S. Bureau of Reclamation. The project was known originally as the Washita Basin Project. The lake and dam were named for the community of Foss, Oklahoma, about 6 miles (9.7 km) south of the site. Their primary purpose is to regulate flow of the river and to provide water for the cities of Bessie, Clinton, Cordell and Hobart. It is western Oklahoma's largest lake and lies entirely within Foss State Park.

== Description ==
The reservoir has a surface area of 8,800 acres (3,600 ha) and a shoreline of 63 miles (101 km). The capacity of the reservoir is 436,812 acre-feet (538,800,000 m^{3}). The reservoir serves a catchment area of 1,496 square miles (3,870 km^{2}). The reservoir has a mean depth of 23 feet (7.0 m) and a maximum depth of 89 feet (27 m).

=== Foss Dam ===
Dam construction began in October, 1958. The dam is 142 feet (43 m) high, 38 feet (12 m) wide (at the crest) and 18,130 feet (5,530 m) long.

=== Foss State Park ===
Foss State Park encompasses 1,749 acres (7,080,000 m^{2}) of land and contains 8 campgrounds, swimming beach, 6 boat ramps, a playground, its marina and restaurant were removed in 2025. It also has 19 miles (31 km) of equestrian and multi-use trails. Foss State Park is often mentioned as a target for sale or closure to help close the state's current budget deficit. Already the state has sold a herd of bison as "surplus property." The bison had recently been moved into Foss State Park from another location in western Oklahoma.

== Water treatment ==
The water quality in Lake Foss is extremely hard. The Bureau of Reclamation built one of the first electrodialysis plants in the United States to process the water before it is delivered to users. The Oklahoma Department of Environmental Quality constructed a new, updated plant to replace the original in 2002. The new plant, built by Ionics, Inc., would also increase production of potable water for its municipal customers from 3 million to 4.5 million U.S. gallons per day.

Water is transported from the dam to consumers via three pumping stations and 50.8 miles (81.8 km) of aqueducts.

== Cold cases involving cars found in the lake ==
In September, 2013 two cars, believed to have been submerged since 1969 and 1970, were found at the bottom of Foss Reservoir by Oklahoma Highway Patrol officers testing new sonar equipment. The cars, a 1952 Chevrolet and a blue 1969 Chevrolet Camaro, each contained three sets of skeletal human remains. They were suspected to be linked to two separate, long-open cold cases from 1969, in the case of the older car, and 1970, in the case of the Camaro. In October 2014 it was announced that both cases were ruled accidental. The 1969 case involved three adults and the 1970 case involved three teenagers.
