= Washita River =

River in the United States

Washita River Ouachita, False Washita
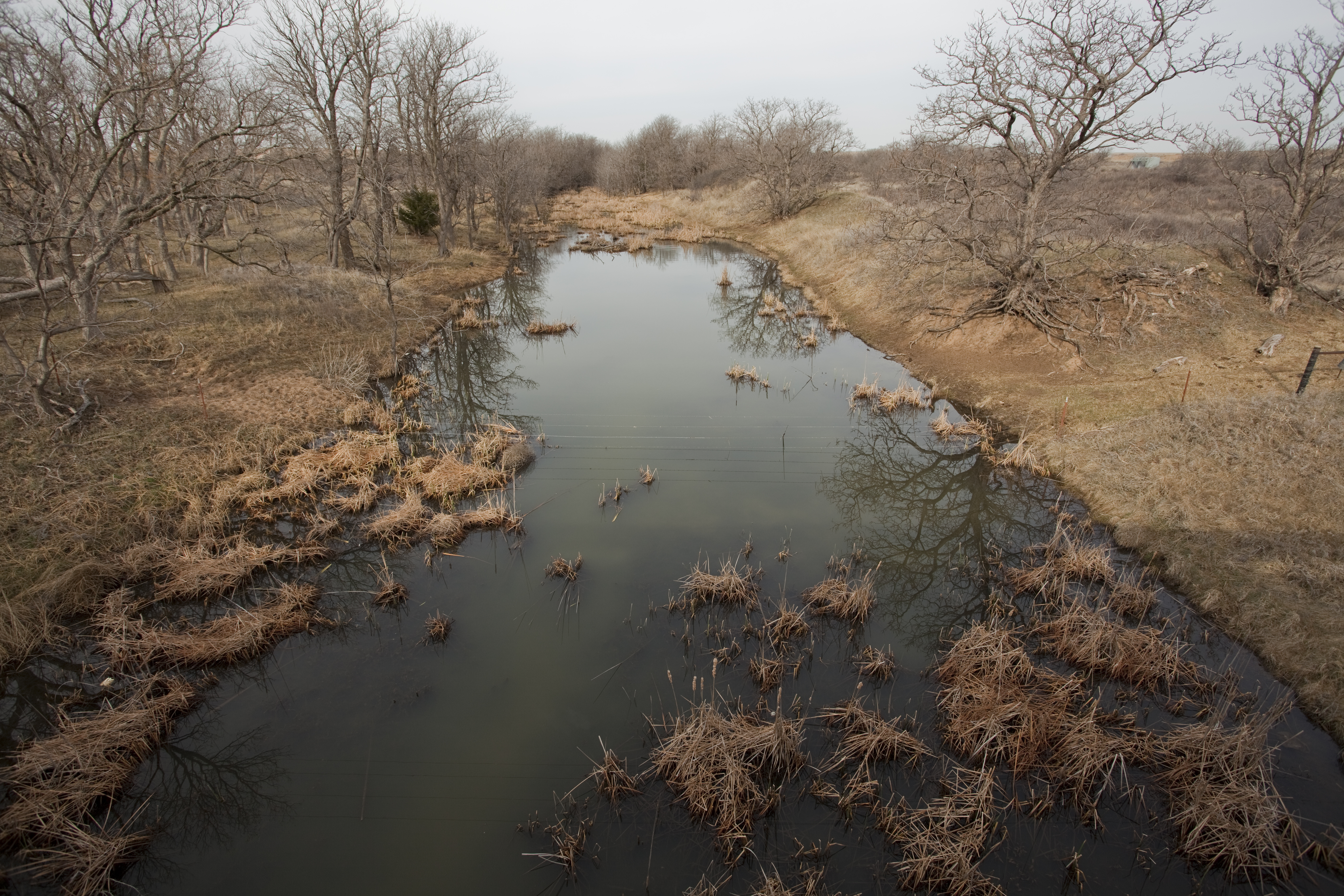
- Upper Washita River in Hemphill County, Texas

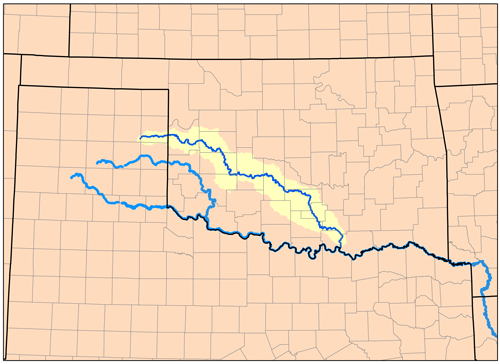
- Map of the Washita River watershed

Location
- Country: United States

Physical characteristics
- Source
  - location: Roberts County, Texas
  - coordinates: 35.6256003°N 100.5962467°W
  - elevation: 3,028 ft (923 m)
- Mouth
  - location: Lake Texoma
  - coordinates: 33.9117669°N 96.5780504°W
  - elevation: 617 ft (188 m)
- Length: 295 mi (475 km)
- Basin size: 7,870 sq mi (20,400 km^{2})
- Discharge
  - location: Dickson
  - average: 1,854 cu ft/s (52.5 m^{3}/s)

Basin features
- River system: Red River

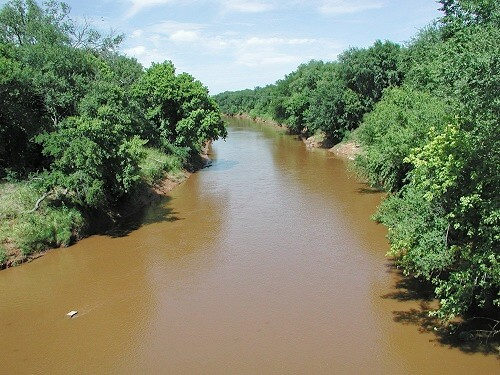
The Washita River at Anadarko, Oklahoma

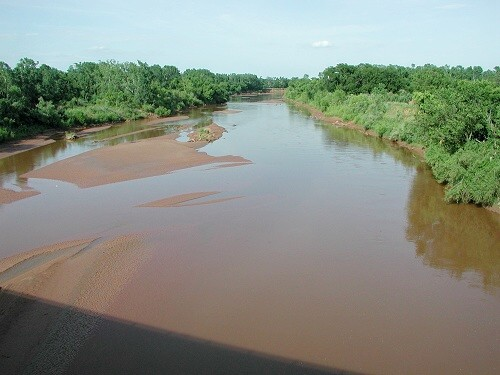
The Washita River near Pauls Valley, Oklahoma

The Washita River (/ˈwɑːʃɪtɑː/) is a river in the U.S. states of Texas and Oklahoma. The river is 295 miles (475 km) long and terminates at its confluence with the Red River, which is now part of Lake Texoma (33°55′N 96°35′W) on the Texas–Oklahoma border.

== Geography ==
The Washita River forms in eastern Roberts County, Texas (35°38′N 100°36′W), near the town of Miami in the Texas panhandle. The river crosses Hemphill County, Texas, and enters Oklahoma in Roger Mills County. It cuts through the Oklahoma counties of Roger Mills, Custer, Washita, Caddo, Grady, Garvin, Murray, Carter, and Johnston before emptying into Lake Texoma, which is the modern border between Bryan County and Marshall County.

The river bisects the heart of the Anadarko Basin, the fifth-largest natural gas formation area in the United States. When the river reaches the Arbuckle Mountains, it drops 30 feet per mile (5.7 m/km) as it cuts through Big Canyon, a limestone gorge 300 feet (91 m) deep.

The Washita's river bed is made up of unstable mud and sand, and its banks are composed of steeply incised and erosive red earth. This makes it one of the most silt-laden streams in North America.

=== Tributaries ===
Along its path, the Foss Dam impounds the Washita River in Custer County to create the Foss Reservoir. Several reservoirs in the Washita River valley hold the waters of small tributaries, including Fort Cobb Lake, Lake Chickasha, and Arbuckle Reservoir.

== History ==
French explorers encountered the Washita River in the early 18th century while traveling upstream on the Red River and thought it was the same stream described by friendly Choctaw tribesmen as the Ouachita River. They soon found that it appeared very different from descriptions of the Ouachita, and named it the Faux Ouachita (False Ouachita). The name was later referred to by English-speaking American settlers as False Washita. After the American Civil War, Americans referred to the river as the Washita.

In 1842, General and future President Zachary Taylor established Fort Washita near the lower end of the river to protect resettled citizens of the Choctaw and Chickasaw nations, who had been removed from the Southeastern United States, from the Plains Indians inhabiting the area. The fort was about 19 miles (31 km) above the confluence of the Washita and Red rivers.

During the later Indian Wars, the Battle of Washita River (also known as the Washita River Massacre) occurred at dawn on November 27, 1868. Lt. Col. George Armstrong Custer’s 7th U.S. Cavalry attacked Black Kettle’s Cheyenne village on the Washita River near present-day Cheyenne, Oklahoma, killing many inhabitants.

Capt. Wyllys Lyman's wagon train was besieged by Indians near the Washita in Hemphill County on September 9–14, 1874.

== See also ==
- List of Oklahoma rivers
- List of Texas rivers
