= Quartz Mountain (disambiguation) =

Quartz Mountain is a mountain located in Greer County in southwest Oklahoma.

Quartz Mountain may also refer to:

- Quartz Mountain (Douglas County, Oregon), mountain located 35 miles (56 km) east of Roseburg
- Quartz Mountain, Oregon, unincorporated community in Lake County

== See also ==
- Quartz Mountains, in southwest Oklahoma
