= Hemlock Falls (Oregon) =

- Interactive map of Hemlock Falls
- Location: Quartz Mountain
- Coordinates: 43.21623°N 122.72866°W
- Type: Block
- Elevation: 2,797 ft (853 m)
- Total height: 45 ft (14 m)
- Total width: 5 ft (2 m)
- Average flow rate: 50 cubic feet per second (1.4 m^{3}/s)

Hemlock Falls is a waterfall from the Hemlock Creek, in the heart of the Umpqua National Forest, just north of Hemlock Lake and its campground, in Douglas County, Oregon. Access to Hemlock Falls is from the Lake in the Woods campground. The waterfall is located in a privileged natural area where the river creates several waterfalls: Clover Falls, Yakso Falls, and Tributary Falls are within a mile distance.

== Trail ==
The trail to Hemlock Falls is approximately 0.9 mi (1 km) out and back. The waterfall is about 25 miles (40 km) from the unincorporated community of Glide along Little River Road (County Road 17), which becomes Forest Road 27. The trailhead is located on the Lake in the Woods campground with frequent signs announcing the waterfall along the trail.

== See also ==
- List of waterfalls in Oregon
