= Mike Brumley =

Mike Brumley may refer to:

- Mike Brumley (catcher) (1938–2016), former catcher in Major League Baseball
- Mike Brumley (infielder) (1963–2024), his son, former utility player in Major League Baseball
