= Quartz Mountain Nature Park =

State park in Oklahoma, United States

Quartz Mountain State Park
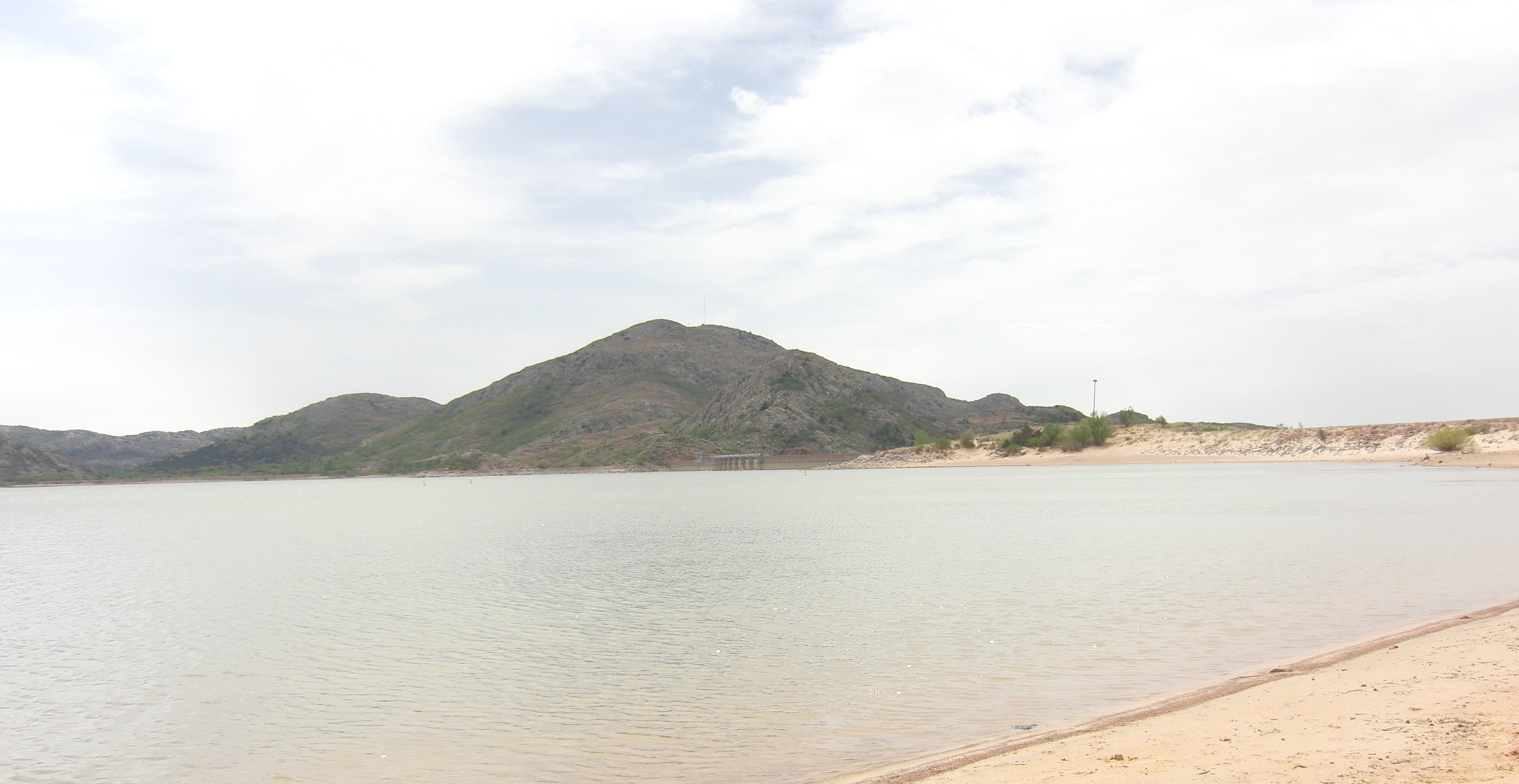
- Lake Altus and granite peaks in Quartz Mountain State Park

- Location within Oklahoma
- Location: Greer and Kiowa, Oklahoma, United States
- Nearest city: Lone Wolf, OK
- Coordinates: 34°56′30″N 99°16′21″W
- Established: 1937
- Visitors: 206,364 (in 2021)
- Governing body: Oklahoma Tourism and Recreation Department
- Website: www.travelok.com/listings/view.profile/id.29860

Quartz Mountain State Park is located in southwest Oklahoma at the western end of the Wichita Mountains, 13 miles (21 km) east of Mangum, Oklahoma and 20 miles (32 km) north of Altus, Oklahoma. The nearest community is Lone Wolf, Oklahoma, about 9 miles (14 km) northeast of the park. It is operated by the Oklahoma Department of Tourism and Recreation. The park began as a 158.3-acre tract adjacent to Lake Altus donated to the state by local residents, who had bought the land for $51.58. It was designated as Quartz Mountain State Park, one of the original seven Oklahoma State Parks designated in 1935. Additional land has been donated since then, and the park now encompasses 4,540 acres (18.4 km^{2}). The park occupies land on the west side of Lake Altus-Lugert, which was originally built in 1927, then expanded in 1940 and renamed Lake Altus-Lugert. The park contains 4,284 acres (17.34 km^{2}) of land and more than 6,000 acres (24 km^{2}) of water.

== History ==
The Civilian Conservation Corps (CCC) established a camp in 1935 at the present park site. The National Park Service (NPS) which managed the camp, proposed to help Oklahoma to develop a system of state parks, using CCC workers who were already trained in all aspects of park development. The state legislature created the Oklahoma Parks Commission, State Fish and Game Commission, under the auspices of the Oklahoma Fish and Game Commission, to manage the newly created system and provided funding of $10,000. The City of Altus and private donors bought 3,000 acres (1,200 ha) of land for the park. NPS spent about $500,000 building roads, trails, rest rooms and other amenities. Quartz Mountain became one of the first seven state parks in Oklahoma when the NPS turned the completed project over to the state in 1937.

== Lodge complex ==
The original Quartz Mountain Lodge was built in 1955. It had 44 rooms, indoor and outdoor swimming pools and a tennis court. A 9-hole golf course was built in 1959 and expanded to 18 holes in 1993. An electrical fire destroyed public access areas of the lodge in 1995, but spared the wing with rooms. It reopened two months later, but in 1998, closed again for demolition. A new lodge was built, which opened under private management in 2001. The new lodge complex includes 118 guest rooms, several cabins, a restaurant, a performing arts complex and shops.

The park has been home to the Oklahoma Summer Arts Institute since 1978. Young Oklahomans between 14 and 18 years old can apply and audition to study with well-known artists. The state spent $17 million to build a new Resort and Arts Conference Center, which opened on March 8, 2001. This facility, named Quartz Mountain Nature Park, became the property of the Oklahoma Board of Regents for Higher Education in 2002 before being turned back over to care of the Oklahoma State Park system in October 2020.

In an effort to ensure the Baldy Point area was preserved, a popular climbing destination since the 1970s, when the land was privately owned, it was purchased in 2001 by The Access Fund, then donated to the State of Oklahoma. In 2002, the area was designated Quartz Mountain Nature Park but reverted to the original name of Quartz Mountain State Park in 2020.

== See also ==
- Quartz Mountain Resort Arts and Conference Center
- Quartz Mountain
- Lake Altus-Lugert
