= Quartz Mountains =

Mountains in the US state Oklahoma

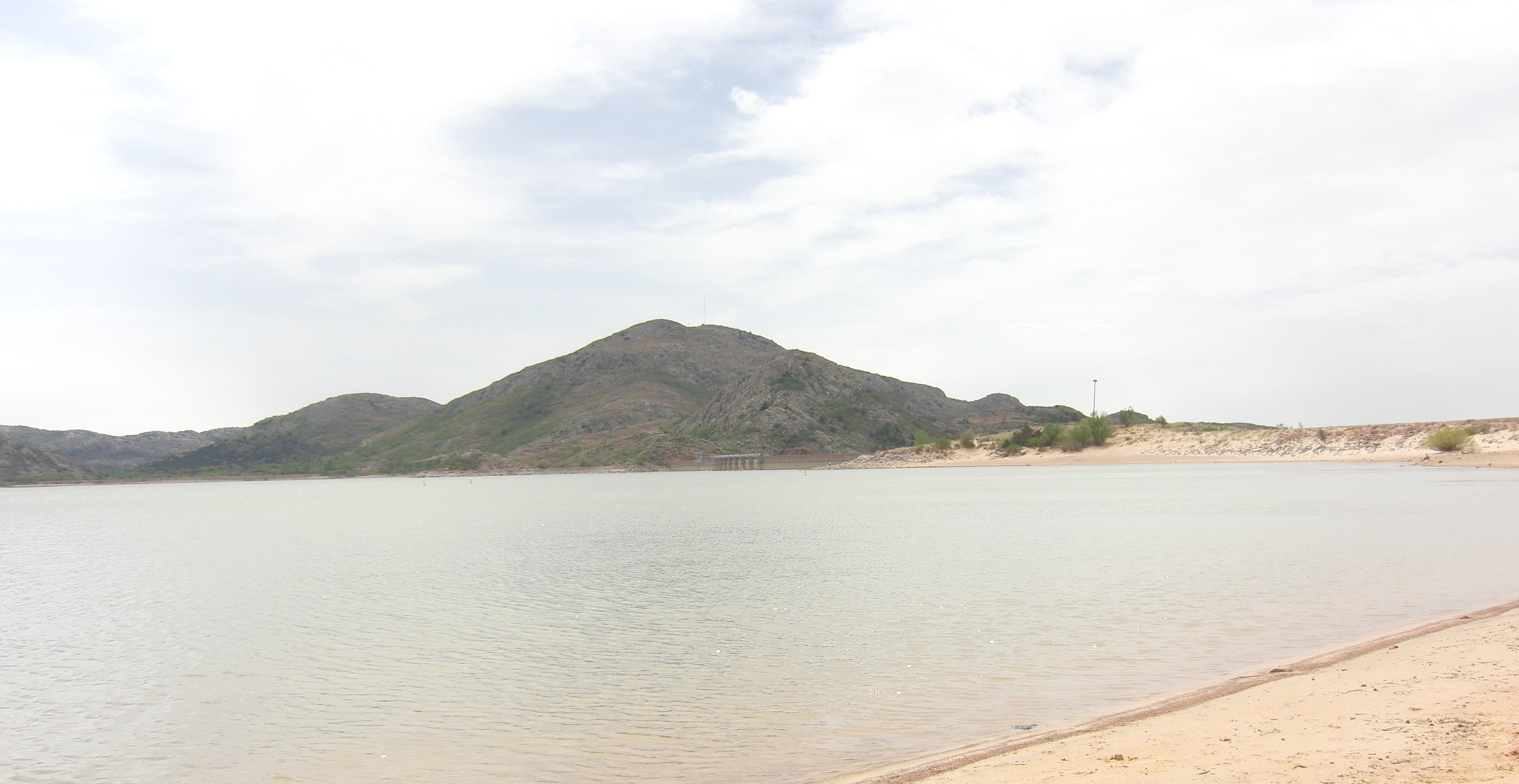
- Lake Altus and the Quartz Mountains

Highest point
- Peak: Quartz Mountain
- Elevation: 1,887 ft (575 m)
- Coordinates: 34°54′25″N 99°19′24″W

Geography
- Location within Oklahoma
- Country: United States
- State: Oklahoma

The Quartz Mountains are an extension of the Wichita Mountains in the far southwestern part of the state of Oklahoma. According to the Encyclopedia of Oklahoma History and Culture, the range was originally formed about 550 million years ago as a "failed continental rift". It was uplifted about 300 million years ago and has since weathered into its current condition. The unique geography provides cover for the most northerly natural population of the Texas live oak, Quercus fusiformis. This rare oak is generally regarded as the most cold hardy evergreen oak.

== General description ==
The section extends west and northwest of the main Wichita range, separated by a plain dotted with smaller foothills. It is about 13 miles (21 km) east of Mangum and 20 miles (32 km) north of Altus. The tallest mountain in the range is Quartz Mountain at 2,330 feet (710 m) above sea level. The area is popular for rockclimbing on its weathered granite outcroppings and is home to Quartz Mountain State Park and Lake Altus-Lugert reservoir.

== History ==
Formerly controlled (at least nominally) by Spain, France, Mexico, and the Republic of Texas, In the mid 19th Century, these mountains were part of the United States area known as the Leased District and Indian Territory. Old Greer County and the Kiowa-Comanche-Apache Reservation were created from this district and became part of Oklahoma Territory. Actually, the area was mostly controlled by nomadic Native American tribes, until they were militarily pushed onto reservations.

Intensive hunting exterminated many species of the region's fauna (e.g., bison, elk, wolves and mountain lions) before the 20th Century. General Philip Sheridan reportedly said, "...[hunters] have done more in the last two years, and will do more in the next year, to settle the vexed Indian question than the entire regular army has done in the last thirty years." Finally, after personal pleas from the Comanche chief, Quanah Parker, President Theodore Roosevelt authorized a policy of repopulating the area with the original species.

== Protected areas ==
In 1927, Lake Altus (now Lake Altus-Lugert) was created at the base of the Quartz Mountains. In 1935, a 148.3-acre (0.600 km^{2}) tract adjoining the lake was declared Quartz Mountain State Park. This tract was bought by citizens of Altus who donated it to the state for use as a park. More acreage has been added over the intervening years, bringing the total park area to 4,540 acres (18.4 km^{2}).

== Quartz Mountain Resort ==
The Oklahoma State Regents for Higher Education operates the Quartz Mountain Resort. It includes a 118-room lodge, a guesthouse, cabins, bunkhouse, RV hookups and primitive campsites.
