= Narbo, California =

Narbo
- Former settlement
- Location in California
- Coordinates: 37°13′02″N 119°42′05″W
- Country: United States
- State: California
- County: Madera
- Elevation: 1,995 ft (608 m)

Narbo is a former settlement in Madera County, California, United States. It was located on Quartz Mountain, approximately 4.25 miles (7 km) north of O'Neals, at an elevation of 1995 feet (608 m).

Narbo was a mining community financed by French investors. The name Narbo comes from Narbonne, the name of one of the investors. Narbo is the Latin name for the town Narbonne, France. A post office operated at Narbo from 1884 to 1887.
