= Lugert, Oklahoma =

- Unincorporated community
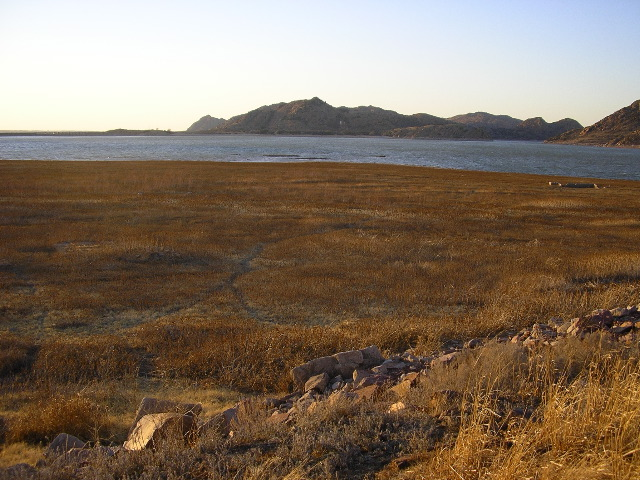
- Foundations from the town of Lugert at the bottom of Lake Altus-Lugert

- Location within Oklahoma and United States Lugert (the United States)
- Coordinates: 34°53′45″N 99°16′31″W
- Country: United States
- State: Oklahoma
- County: Kiowa
- Time zone: UTC-6 (Central (CST))
  - Summer (DST): UTC-5 (CDT)
- GNIS feature ID: 1100597

Lugert is an unincorporated community in Kiowa County, Oklahoma, United States. The town of Lugert was founded in 1901 on 80 acres (320,000 m^{2}). In the town, there was a general store that housed the post office and sold dry goods, school supplies, groceries, harnesses, axes and much more. It was named for Frank Lugert, who had moved to the area in 1898. Lugert owned land where the town was sited and also owned the general store. At the peak of its prosperity the town had a bank, two hotels, two pool halls, two restaurants, a saloon and a lumberyard.

On April 27, 1912, about 12:30 p.m. a tornado hit Lugert, which was then a town of 300 inhabitants. Three people died in the tornado and 41 of the 42 business buildings in the town were destroyed. In 1927, the city of Altus built a 458 ft (140 m) dam, 27 feet (8.2 m) high, across the North Fork of the Red River for a source of city water. Lake Altus-Lugert flooded the original town of Lugert.

The current Lugert, on Oklahoma State Highway 44, is immediately next to Lake Altus-Lugert and Quartz Mountain State Park.
