= Oklahoma tornado outbreak =

Numerous tornado outbreaks have occurred in Oklahoma since modern records have been kept.

Oklahoma tornado outbreak may refer to:

- Tornado outbreak of May 10, 1905, including the 1905 Snyder tornado, the second-deadliest tornado in Oklahoma history
- Tornado outbreak of April 27–29, 1912, a prolific outbreak featuring several strong-to-violent tornadoes
- 1947 Glazier–Higgins–Woodward tornadoes, the deadliest tornado event in Oklahoma history and the sixth-deadliest in U.S. history
- 1948 Tinker Air Force Base tornadoes, an event featuring the first-ever official tornado forecast
- 1955 Great Plains tornado outbreak, an outbreak featuring several tornadoes throughout Oklahoma, including the destructive Blackwell tornado
- Tornado outbreak of April 26, 1991, an outbreak featuring numerous violent tornadoes in northern Oklahoma
- 1999 Oklahoma tornado outbreak, the most prolific tornado outbreak in Oklahoma history
- Tornado outbreak sequence of May 21–26, 2011, an outbreak featuring numerous violent tornadoes in the state
- Tornado outbreak of May 18–21, 2013, including the 2013 Moore tornado, the third-costliest tornado on record
- Tornado outbreak of May 26–31, 2013, including the 2013 El Reno tornado, the widest tornado on record

== See also ==
- Category:Tornadoes in Oklahoma
