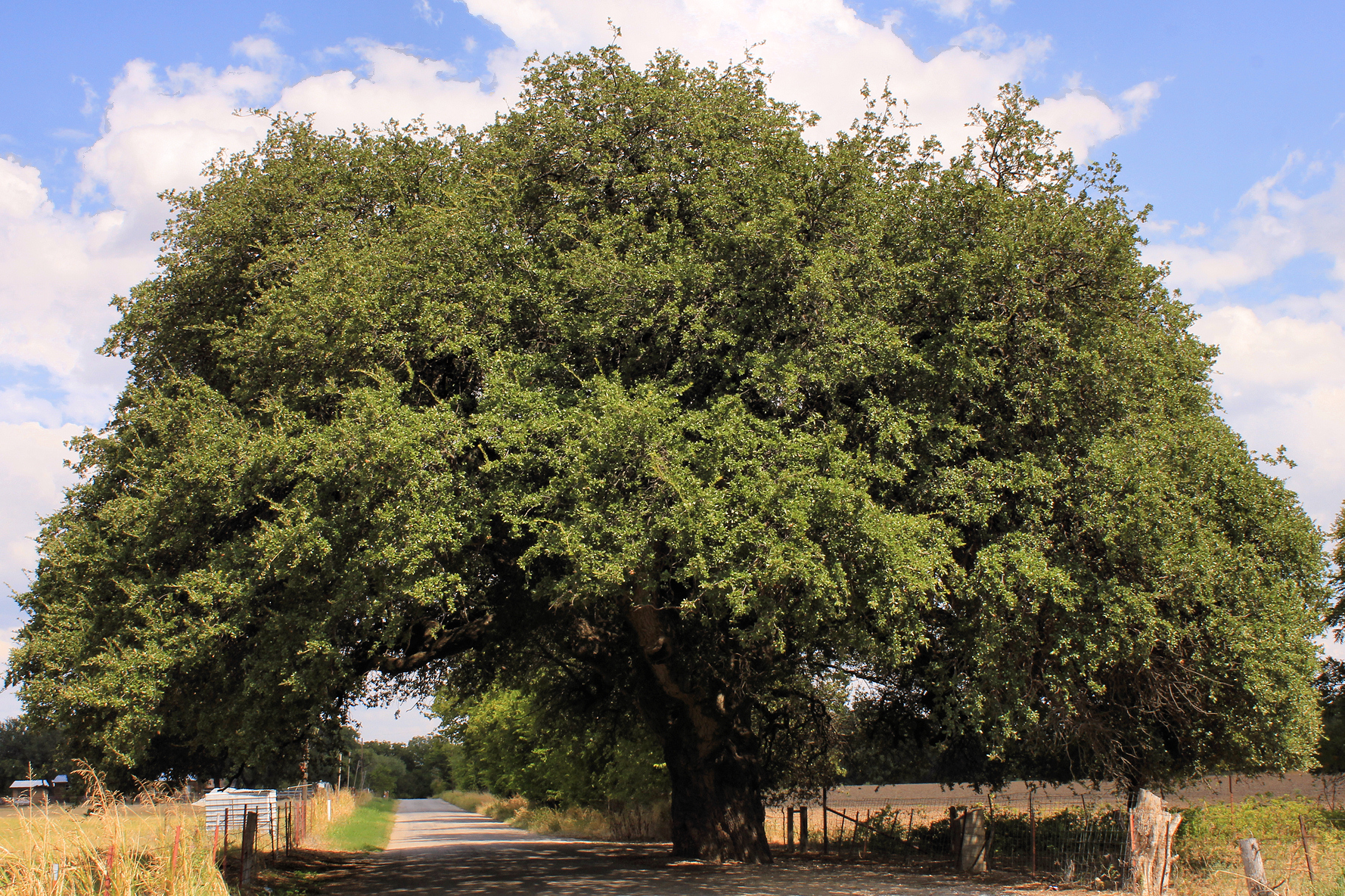
- Matrimonial oak near San Saba, Texas

Conservation status
- Least Concern (IUCN 3.1)

Scientific classification
- Kingdom: Plantae
- Clade: Embryophytes
- Clade: Tracheophytes
- Clade: Spermatophytes
- Clade: Angiosperms
- Clade: Eudicots
- Clade: Rosids
- Order: Fagales
- Family: Fagaceae
- Genus: Quercus
- Subgenus: Quercus subg. Quercus
- Section: Quercus sect. Virentes
- Species: Q. fusiformis

Binomial name
- Quercus fusiformis Small

Synonyms
- List: Quercus oleoides var. quaterna C.H.Mull.; Quercus virginiana var. fusiformis (Small) Sarg.; Quercus virginiana subsp. fusiformis (Small) A.E.Murray; Quercus virginiana var. macrophylla Sarg.; Quercus virginiana f. macrophylla (Sarg.) Trel.

= Quercus fusiformis =

Escarpment live oak

Species of oak tree

Quercus fusiformis (also often referred to as Q. virginiana var. fusiformis), commonly known as escarpment live oak, plateau live oak, plateau oak, or Texas live oak, is an semi-evergreen/tardily deciduous tree. Its native range includes the Quartz Mountains and Wichita Mountains in southwestern Oklahoma, through Texas (approximately from the Brazos River west up to the Pecos River and the southern Llano Estacado), to the Mexican states of Coahuila, Tamaulipas, and Nuevo León.

Quercus fusiformis is an evergreen tree in the southern live oaks section of the genus Quercus (section Virentes). It is distinguished from Quercus virginiana (southern live oak) most easily by the acorns, which are slightly larger and with a more pointed apex. It is also a smaller tree, not exceeding 1 metre (40 inches) in trunk diameter – compared to 2.5 m (75 in) in diameter in southern live oak – with more erect branching and a less wide crown. Like Q. virginiana, its magnificent, stately form and unparalleled longevity has endeared it to generations of residents throughout its native range. Its low hanging branches are a favorite for local children to climb and play in.

Escarpment live oak is typically found on dry sites, unlike southern live oak, which prefers moister conditions. The tree, especially the Quartz Mountains variety, is generally accepted to be the hardiest evergreen oak, able to withstand very cold winters with minimal leaf burn in areas as cold as USDA zone 6a. For this reason the tree has become popular within the landscape industry for its beauty, ability to endure urban conditions, and general hardiness. It is prevalently used for these purposes in Texas and southern Oklahoma but use is becoming more widespread in the Western US.

The largest recorded individual tree of Q. fusiformis in the state of Texas is found in Bosque County (not to be confused with the "Election Oak" or Bosque County Oak). It has a circumference of 870 centimetres (342 in), which is actually larger than the largest recorded Q. virginiana in the state, listed at 860 cm (338 in).
