= Tornado outbreak of April 27–29, 1912 =

Weather event in Oklahoma, United States

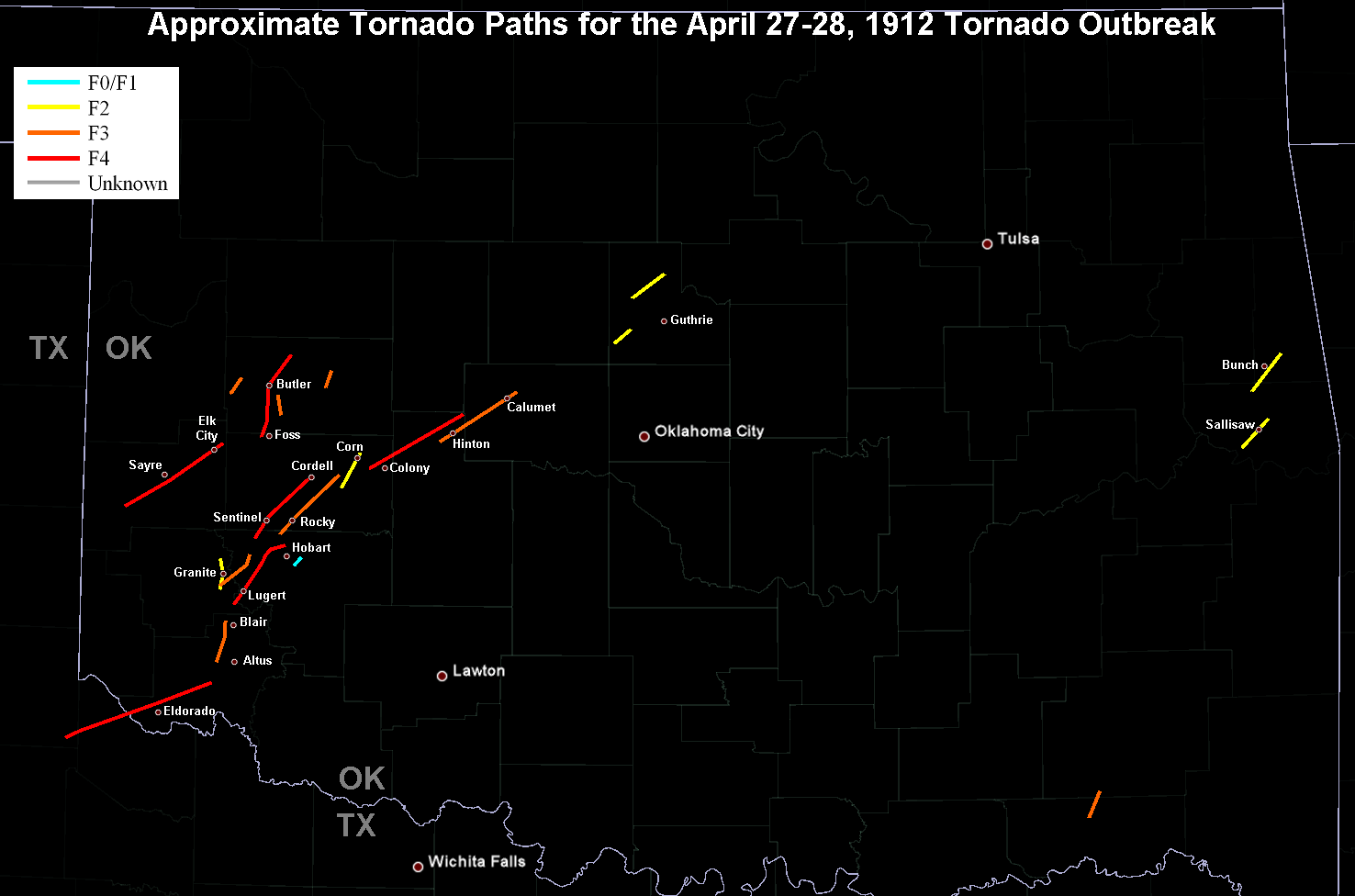
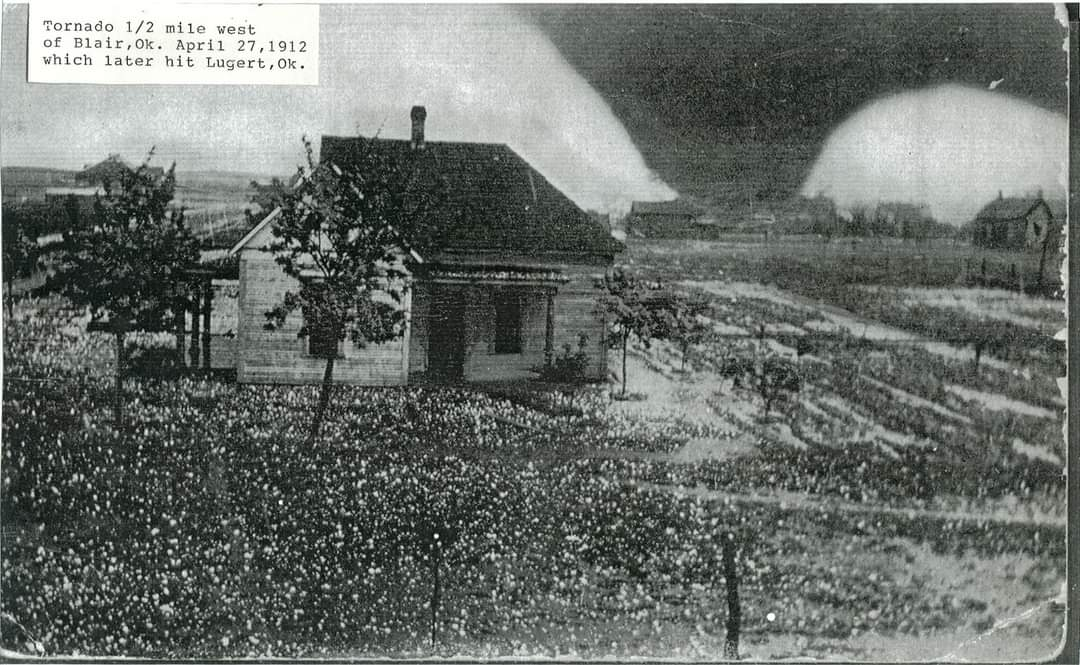
- Top: A map showing the tracks of tornadoes across Oklahoma on April 27. Bottom: A large tornado seen from Blair, Oklahoma. This tornado was later noted to have struck Lugert, Oklahoma.

Meteorological history
- Formed: April 27, 1912
- Dissipated: April 28, 1912

Tornado outbreak
- Tornadoes: 26
- Max. rating: F4 tornado
- Duration: Approximately 24 hours

Overall effects
- Fatalities: ≥ 47
- Injuries: ≥ 175

From April 27–29, 1912, a major tornado outbreak generated at least six violent tornadoes in Oklahoma, with near-constant activity until early the next day. At least 15 cities were affected, 40 people died, and 120 others were injured. Tornado researcher Thomas P. Grazulis considered this outbreak to be among the worst on record in the state of Oklahoma, as measured by fatalities and violent tornadoes. At least five strong tornadoes affected Washita County, Oklahoma, during this outbreak. (Note: An outbreak is generally defined as a group of at least six tornadoes (the number sometimes varies slightly according to local climatology) with no more than a six-hour gap between individual tornadoes. An outbreak sequence, prior to (after) the start of modern records in 1950, is defined as a period of no more than two (one) consecutive days without at least one significant (F2 or stronger) tornado.) (Note: The Fujita scale was devised under the aegis of scientist T. Theodore Fujita in the early 1970s. Prior to the advent of the scale in 1971, tornadoes in the United States were officially unrated. While the Fujita scale has been superseded by the Enhanced Fujita scale in the U.S. since February 1, 2007, Canada utilized the old scale until April 1, 2013; nations elsewhere, like the United Kingdom, apply other classifications such as the TORRO scale.) (Note: Historically, the number of tornadoes globally and in the United States was and is likely underrepresented: research by Grazulis on annual tornado activity suggests that, as of 2001, only 53% of yearly U.S. tornadoes were officially recorded. Documentation of tornadoes outside the United States was historically less exhaustive, owing to the lack of monitors in many nations and, in some cases, to internal political controls on public information. Most countries only recorded tornadoes that produced severe damage or loss of life. Significant low biases in U.S. tornado counts likely occurred through the early 1990s, when advanced NEXRAD was first installed and the National Weather Service began comprehensively verifying tornado occurrences.)

== Background ==
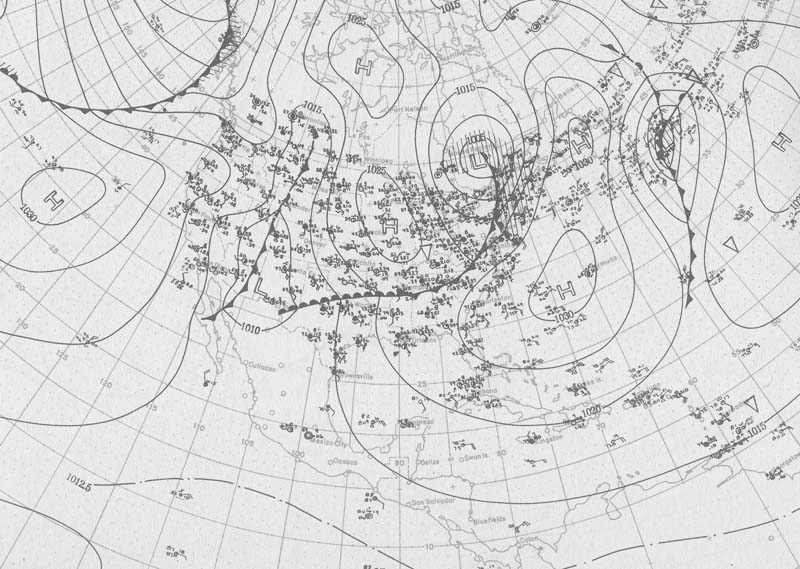
A weather map for April 27 at 7:00 am CST

Limited weather data was collected and recorded at that time in Oklahoma. Antedating upper atmospheric measurements, most data collection was of human observations, along with temperature, pressure, wind speed and direction, and rainfall. A cold front moved south through Oklahoma into Texas on April 26, before stalling as a stationary front draped across Central Texas, oriented from northeast to southwest. Early on April 27, it pushed back northward against a warm front to the east, due to a vigorous upper-atmospheric trough approaching from the west. The warm front was noted to have moved from the southeast on April 27 to the northeast on April 28; this movement of warm air against the cold front, in proximity to a low-pressure area over western Oklahoma, provided sufficient atmospheric lift, thereby fueling the storms that provided the tornado activity.

== Confirmed tornadoes ==
Confirmed tornadoes by Fujita rating
FU	F0	F1	F2	F3	F4	F5	Total
?	1	1	10	6	8	0	≥ 26

=== April 27 event ===
Confirmed tornadoes – Saturday, April 27, 1912 (Note: All dates are based on the local time zone where the tornado touched down; however, all times are in Coordinated Universal Time and dates are split at midnight CST/CDT for consistency.) (Note: Prior to 1994, only the average widths of tornado paths were officially listed.)
F#	Location	County / Parish	State	Time (UTC)	Path length	Max. width	Summary
F4	SE of Kirkland, TX to N of Eldorado, OK	Childress, Hardeman, Jackson	TX, OK	16:30–?	40 miles (64 km)	800 yards (730 m)	5 deaths – Major, long-tracked tornado killed five people, injured 23 others, and caused $77,000 in losses, including $65,000 in Texas and $12,000 in Oklahoma. Four of the five deaths were in a single family. Tornado struck 43 farms and destroyed or damaged 30 homes, some of which were swept away.
F2	Warren	Jackson	OK	18:15–?	Unknown	Unknown	Tornado hit Warren around noon CST. Details are unavailable.
F4	SE of Granite to Lugert to NW of Hobart	Greer, Kiowa	OK	18:30–?	20 miles (32 km)	800 yards (730 m)	7+ deaths – Tornado leveled all but two buildings in Lugert, killing a mother and her daughter there. Papers were found 75 mi (121 km) distant. Tornado also caused at least three—possibly five—deaths and killed at least 100 cattle near Hobart. 25 people were injured and losses totaled $300,000.
F3	Rocky	Washita	OK	19:15–?	20 miles (32 km)	800 yards (730 m)	Tornado destroyed about 50 homes, a school, and 10 barns in and near Rocky. Tornado began 5 mi (8.0 km) southwest of town and ended 15 mi (24 km) northeast of town. Two injuries were reported.
F2	Corn	Washita	OK	19:50–?	10 miles (16 km)	Unknown	4 deaths – Tornado hit Corn, then called Korn until World War I, and the nearby "Korn Valley", where four people died. No other information is available.
F4	W of Colony to S of Geary	Washita, Caddo, Blaine	OK	20:00–?	27 miles (43 km)	800 yards (730 m)	2 deaths – Large, powerful tornado devastated farms across Caddo County. Losses totaled $5,000 and 15 people were injured.
F3	W of Altus to W of Blair	Jackson	OK	20:30–?	11 miles (18 km)	250 yards (230 m)	Tornado devastated about 12 farms near Martha. One person was injured and losses totaled $19,000.
F3	SW of Hinton to Calumet to NW of El Reno	Caddo, Canadian	OK	21:00–?	23 miles (37 km)	400 yards (370 m)	3+ deaths – Strong tornado hit the towns of Hinton and Calumet, destroying 26 structures in the latter, where three people died. Four others may have been killed in Hinton. A sign from Hinton was found to have been carried north of Calumet. Losses totaled $125,000 and four injuries were reported.
F4	S of Bartley to Cambridge	Red Willow, Furnas	NE	22:00–?	10 miles (16 km)	Unknown	Violent tornado destroyed at least five barns, along with three farmhouses. An entire farmstead was swept clean. Four people survived the tornado in an orchard, but with injuries.
F4	E of Erick to E of Sayre to Elk City	Beckham	OK	22:45–?	23 miles (37 km)	150 yards (140 m)	2 deaths – Tornado destroyed 35 buildings, killed 15 livestock, and injured 15 people. Tornado destroyed 11 homes and caused fatalities near Sayre. Five funnel clouds were observed along the path of the storm, and debris from homes was strewn for miles.
F4	W of Foss to Butler	Washita, Custer	OK	00:30–?	20 miles (32 km)	150 yards (140 m)	6 deaths – Tornado destroyed the town of Foss and 32 homes on the eastern side of Butler. Debris from the latter town was found in Putnam, 15 mi (24 km) to the northeast. Losses totaled $50,000 and 20 injuries were reported.
F3	SW of Speer to S of Dela	Choctaw	OK	00:30–?	7 miles (11 km)	167 yards (153 m)	1 death – Details are unknown. Three injuries occurred.
F2	Granite	Greer	OK	02:20–?	8 miles (13 km)	Unknown	Details are unknown.
F3	NW of Stratford to SE of Butler	Custer	OK	02:30–?	5 miles (8.0 km)	Unknown	1 death – Tornado damaged or destroyed eight farmhouses. Losses totaled $50,000.
F4	NW of Hobart to Sentinel to NW of Cordell	Kiowa, Washita	OK	02:45–?	20 miles (32 km)	600 yards (550 m)	4 deaths – Violent tornado damaged or destroyed about 60 homes in Sentinel, mostly in the western half of the town. No injuries resulted, as the entire population had seen the funnel approaching 15 minutes in advance. Two people died on a farm southwest of Sentinel. The tornado then continued to the northwestern edge of Cordell, destroying six more homes and killing two people before turning east and dissipating. Losses reached $75,000 and 15 injuries occurred along the path.
F3	S of Granite to N of Lone Wolf	Greer, Kiowa	OK	02:45–?	12 miles (19 km)	Unknown	1 death – Tornado destroyed buildings and farmhouses on at least 14 farms. Five people were injured.

=== April 28 event ===
Confirmed tornadoes – Sunday, April 28, 1912
F#	Location	County / Parish	State	Time (UTC)	Path length	Max. width	Summary
F2	Crescent to Mulhall	Logan	OK	05:45–?	5 miles (8.0 km)	Unknown	2 deaths – Tornado destroyed at least two homes. Two people were crushed to death in a storm cave.
F2	W of Butler	Custer	OK	05:45–?	Unknown	Unknown	Tornado destroyed several barns.
F2	E of Cashion to Cedar Valley	Logan	OK	05:55–?	5 miles (8.0 km)	Unknown	Tornado destroyed a home and a barn 8 mi (13 km) southwest of Guthrie.
F0	SE of Hobart	Kiowa	OK	07:30–?	3 miles (4.8 km)	Unknown	Tornado reported.
F2	SW of Sallisaw	Sequoyah	OK	08:30–?	10 miles (16 km)	Unknown	Tornado destroyed six homes.
F2	N of Marble to E of Bunch	Sequoyah, Adair	OK	08:30–?	12 miles (19 km)	Unknown	2 deaths – Details are unknown. Four injuries were reported.
F2	N of Bono to S of Joshua	Johnson	TX	17:00–?	5 miles (8.0 km)	50 yards (46 m)	Tornado destroyed barns and small homes.
F4	SSW of Henderson to S of Church Hill to Tatum	Rusk, Panola	TX	19:30–?	30 miles (48 km)	200 yards (180 m)	4 deaths – Long-tracked tornado destroyed 30 or more homes in six communities. It destroyed a brick home, killing a man inside. Two people were thrown 500 yd (460 m) as well. Downburst damage occurred in Tatum. 14 injuries occurred along the path.
F1	Fouke	Cass	TX	01:00–?	Unknown	Unknown	2 deaths – Tornado occurred 12 mi (19 km) south of Texarkana, killing two women beneath a fallen tree. 10 other people were injured.

=== April 29 event ===
Confirmed tornadoes – Monday, April 29, 1912
F#	Location	County / Parish	State	Time (UTC)	Path length	Max. width	Summary
F2	S of Liddieville to N of Winnsboro	Franklin	LA	Unknown	10 miles (16 km)	400 yards (370 m)	3 deaths – Tornado destroyed considerable amounts of timberland, along with several homes. 15 people were injured.

== See also ==
- Tornadoes in Oklahoma
- List of North American tornadoes and tornado outbreaks
- Tornado outbreak of April 20–22, 1912 – Similarly severe outbreak impacted much of the same region

== Sources ==
- Grazulis, Thomas P. (July 1993). Significant Tornadoes 1680–1991: A Chronology and Analysis of Events. St. Johnsbury, Vermont: The Tornado Project of Environmental Films. ISBN 1-879362-03-1.
- Grazulis, Thomas P. (2001a). The Tornado: Nature's Ultimate Windstorm. Norman: University of Oklahoma Press. ISBN 978-0-8061-3538-0.
- Grazulis, Thomas P. (2001b). F5-F6 Tornadoes. St. Johnsbury, Vermont: The Tornado Project of Environmental Films.
