= Oklahoma State Reformatory =

Prison in Oklahoma, United States

Coordinates: 34°57′22″N 99°21′22″W

- Location in Oklahoma
- Location: Granite, Oklahoma
- Status: operational
- Security class: Medium
- Capacity: 1050
- Opened: 1910
- Managed by: Oklahoma Department of Corrections
- Warden: William "Chris" Rankins
- Website: Oklahoma Department of Corrections - Oklahoma State Reformatory

The Oklahoma State Reformatory is a medium-security facility with some maximum and minimum-security housing for adult male inmates. Located off of State Highway 9 in Granite, Oklahoma, the 10-acre (4.0 ha) facility has a maximum capacity of 1042 inmates. The medium-security area accommodates 799 prisoners, minimum-security area houses roughly 200, and the maximum-security area with about 43 inmates. The prison currently houses approximately 975 prisoners. The prison was established by an act of the legislature in 1909 and constructed through prison labor, housing its first inmate in 1910. The facility is well known for the significant roles women played in its foundation and governance, most notably having the first female warden administer an all-male prison in the nation.

== History ==
=== Founding of the prison ===
In 1907, Kate Barnard was appointed Oklahoma Commissioner of Charities and Corrections. After visiting prisons in Kansas detaining Oklahoma offenders, Barnard concluded that a more civil and humane prison needed to be constructed in Oklahoma. Within two years, Barnard persuaded the legislature to authorize development of both the Oklahoma State Penitentiary and the Oklahoma State Reformatory.

The reformatory was established by an act of the legislature in 1909. Construction began shortly thereafter, housing its first inmate in 1910. Situated adjacent to Granite Mountain (also known as "White Mountain"), the reformatory was constructed through prison labor using the granite quarried from the mountain. A large factor in the selection of the institution's site was the prospect of employing the prison's inmates to work in the quarry for minimal wages.

No original structures in the complex remain. The oldest standing, the Oklahoma State Industries broom factory/upholstery building, was constructed in 1921. All other buildings currently in use have been constructed since 1957. In 1928, the institution had one main guard tower, dedicated to a former warden, on which stood cell houses on either side. The facility currently operates two of the four towers which are manned by armed officers for direct observation. The granite walls surrounding the compound of radiating cell blocks rise approximately twenty-four feet tall with a thickness of three feet at grade level and two feet at its top. Layers of razor wire extend along the top as well as inside of the wall's interior. These wires are linked up to an Intrepid Micro-Point Intrusion Detection system, monitored by the central control room, which detects vibrations caused by cutting and/or climbing.

=== The early years ===
In 1914, Barnard stepped down after seven years as Commissioner of Charities and Corrections and was succeeded by William D. Mathews. After her departure, the original rehabilitative goals of the facility were weakened. The governor of Oklahoma in 1915, Robert L. Williams was primarily concerned with the economic interests of the reformatory. Through his speeches, he saw no difference between the penitentiary and the reformatory, believing that the reformatory should become a second penitentiary and its warden to be businessman-like. In an attempt to make the prison more self-sustaining, Governor Williams negotiated with the Rock Island Railroad Company, using the state-owned mountain of granite and the reformatory's inmates for labor. After three years, Governor Williams claimed an enlargement and improvement within several prison industrial and buildings. During World War I, the institution assisted the U.S. military by supplying the Aviation Field at Fort Sill with building materials.

=== Under Waters ===
When James B. A. Robertson replaced Williams as governor in 1919, Robertson appointed Dr. George A. Waters, a highly respected farmer and physician, as warden of the Reformatory. During his years as supervisor of the prison, Waters requested that the Board of Public Affairs create a general library for the inmates, consisting of 500 books while also connecting with local charity organizations willing to donate books. In addition to reforming the prison within its walls, Waters trained the prisoners in scientific agriculture on the farm land surrounding the Reformatory, establishing experimental seed farms and specialized husbandry for cattle, sheep, and hogs. Waters acquired technical aid from the Agricultural and Mechanical College at Stillwater.

In 1923, John C. Walton replaced Robertson as governor, splitting the Robertson-Waters team and ousting Waters from his position as warden. During his brief term, Governor Walton exchanged Waters' employees with unqualified people to work in the prisons' shops, which greatly damaged the shop's inventories. He altered, even eliminated, several constructive projects Waters had helped create and build. Due to massive amounts of corruption at all levels, Walton was impeached only a year into his term and replaced by Lieutenant Governor Martin E. Trapp. Waters was reappointed as warden and began to clean up the damage to the Reformatory. In 1926, Warden J. J. Savage made his Annual Report of the Oklahoma State Reformatory and observed that the inmates were going to school for half a day and working for the other half. He was impressed by how many of the prisoners were learning a trade, such as bakery, cooking, plumbing, cleaners, and stonemasonry. With the death of Warden George Waters in 1927, Mrs. Clara Waters replaced her deceased husband, becoming the first woman to head an all-male prison in the United States.

Mrs. Waters was well known for her unique style of punishment. It was not uncommon for the young men at the prison to be dressed in women's clothing and then displayed for visitors to taunt and ridicule them. In spite of her unusual punishments, Mrs. Waters focused mainly on educational and religious programs for prisoners. She created an educational program within the facility, which would later become the first official high school established behind the walls of a prison in the United States, Lakeside High School at Oklahoma State Reformatory.

Mrs. Waters was highly regarded locally as well as nationally. In October 1930, she was appointed to attend the annual meeting of the American Prison Congress in Louisville, Kentucky by the governor at the time, William J. Holloway, as his personal representative and delegate from Oklahoma. There she was nominated to the board of directors of the National Prison Organization. She was considered one of the most convincing women speakers in the country; indeed Mrs. Waters was informed by the Democratic National Committee in September 1932 that her name was on the list of speakers designated to tour the country. In October 1933, she was also elected in Atlantic City, New Jersey as the vice-president of the National Prison Association and was appointed into Oklahoma's Hall of Fame in 1935.

Mrs. Waters was warden during the infamous prison break in Granite on February 17, 1935. The prison employees of the Oklahoma State Reformatory were caught off guard when around 31 inmates attempted to escape. The prisoners had managed to smuggle two guns into their possession, using them to threaten the officers on duty. Eight surrendered and two returned voluntarily the day of the escape. Eighteen were still at large the next day. Mrs. Waters was fired from her position as Warden, ending the Waters' family era within the reformatory.

== Notable inmates ==
The Oklahoma State Reformatory was home for roughly fourteen months to aviator Wiley Post. A native Texan, Post moved to Oklahoma to work in the prosperous oil fields in order to raise money for his own personal airplane. During 1921, he was involved in a robbery and was sentenced to ten years in the reformatory. After only serving about one-tenth of his original sentence, Post was given a full pardon in December 1934. After his time at the Oklahoma State Reformatory, Post went on to be one of the first pilots to make a non-stop flight from the United States to Germany and the first to fly solo around the world, setting many record times. His life, as well as that of Oklahoma's beloved Will Rogers, ended on August 15, 1935 when his airplane crashed near Point Barrow, Alaska.

In 1945, Clarence Carnes, known as "Choctaw Kid," entered the Oklahoma State Reformatory charged with the murder of an Oklahoma service station attendant. During his time at the reformatory, Carnes and two other men were convicted on federal kidnapping charges and were sentenced to 99 years in prison. Instead of serving his time at the reformatory, Carnes was transferred due to his behavioral problems to Alcatraz in San Francisco Bay. At age 18, he was the youngest inmate ever imprisoned within its walls.

While serving his sentence in Alcatraz, Carnes was involved in an escape along with five fellow inmates and took over a section of their cell block. U.S. Marines as well as prison guards from distances as far away as Kansas were sent to retake the facility. Three of the six inmates died during the assault, and two others were executed shortly thereafter. Carnes avoided the death penalty because he did not murder officers assigned to him during the escape; he lived until 61, dying at the Medical Center for Federal Prisoners in Springfield, Missouri.
