= Mike Brumley (catcher) =

American baseball player (1938-2016)

- Catcher
- Born: July 10, 1938; Granite, Oklahoma, U.S.
- Died: August 8, 2016 (aged 78); Grapevine, Texas, U.S.
- Batted: Left Threw: Right

MLB debut
- April 18, 1964, for the Washington Senators

Last MLB appearance
- September 15, 1966, for the Washington Senators

MLB statistics
- Batting average: .229
- Home runs: 5
- Runs batted in: 50
- Stats at Baseball Reference

Teams
- Washington Senators (1964–1966)

Tony Mike Brumley (July 10, 1938 – August 8, 2016) was an American professional baseball player. A catcher and native of Granite, Oklahoma, he played for the Washington Senators of Major League Baseball for two full seasons (1964–1965) and part of a third (1966). The 5 ft 10 in (1.78 m), 195 lb (88 kg) Brumley batted left-handed and threw right-handed. His son, also named Mike, played in all or parts of eight MLB seasons as an infielder and remained in baseball as a minor-league manager and instructor.

Brumley graduated from Central High School in Oklahoma City in 1956, having played fullback on the football team and receiving all-city honorable mention as catcher on the baseball team. He played college baseball for the Oklahoma Sooners. Brumley originally signed with the Brooklyn Dodgers and played seven seasons in the Dodger farm system. A three-time minor league All-Star, Brumley appeared in a career-high 136 games with the Senators during his rookie season, earning the catcher spot on the Topps All-Star Rookie Team for 1964. A slump the next year relegated him to a reserve role after hitting .208.

In a three-season career, Brumley was a .229 hitter with five home runs and 50 RBI in 295 games. His 151 hits also included 24 doubles and two triples. He posted a .991 fielding percentage with only 10 errors in 1106 chances.

Brumley ended his pro career after the 1970 minor-league season. In retirement, he resided in Keller, Texas.

== See also ==
- Second generation MLB players
