= Granite, Oklahoma =

- Town
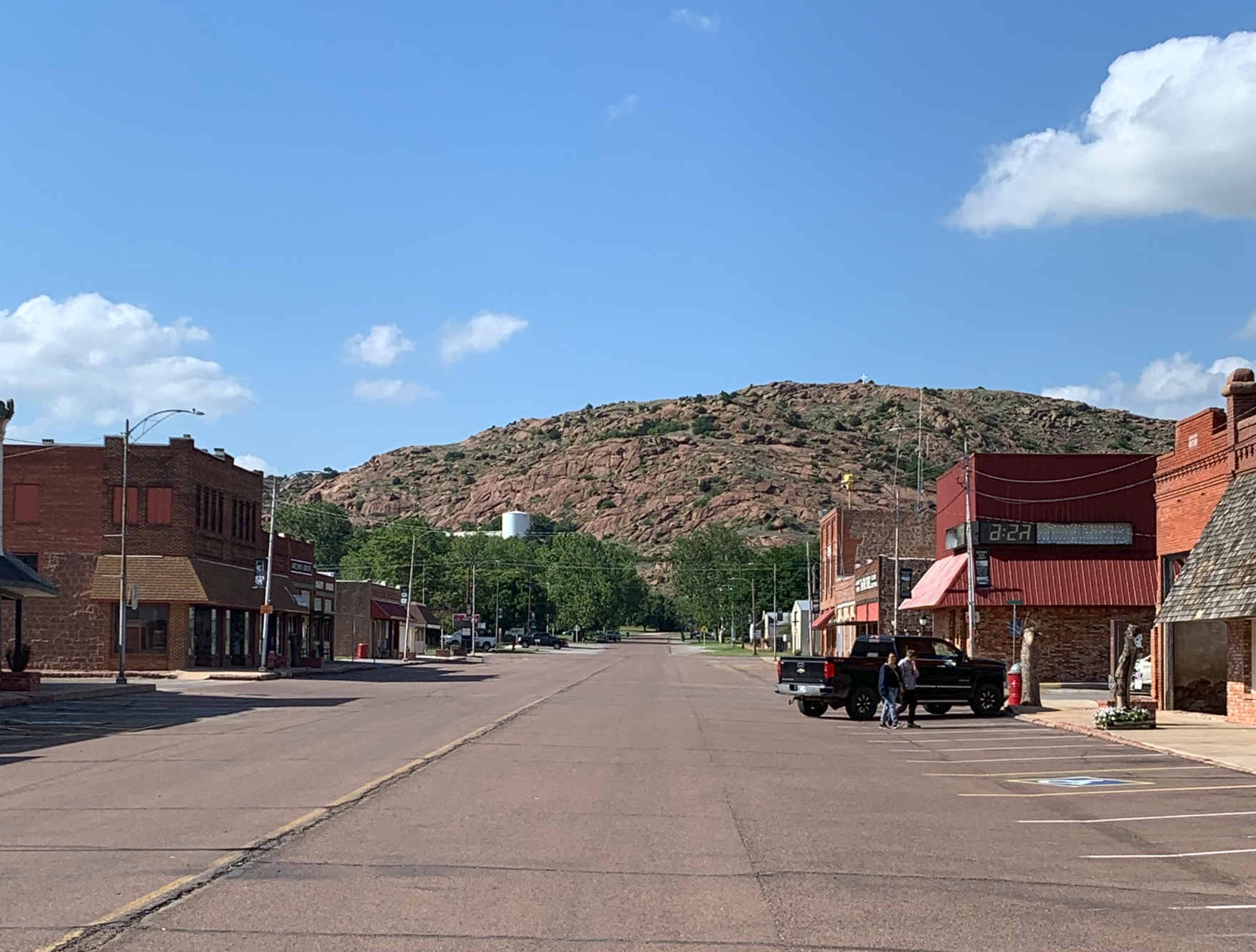
- Main Street, with Headquarters Mountain in the background.

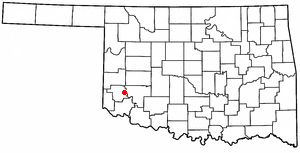
- Location of Granite, Oklahoma
- Coordinates: 34°57′44″N 99°23′03″W
- Country: United States
- State: Oklahoma
- County: Greer

Area
  - Total: 3.39 sq mi (8.77 km^{2})
  - Land: 3.37 sq mi (8.73 km^{2})
  - Water: 0.015 sq mi (0.04 km^{2})
- Elevation: 1,595 ft (486 m)

Population (2020)
  - Total: 1,628
  - Density: 482.9/sq mi (186.44/km^{2})
- Time zone: UTC-6 (Central (CST))
  - Summer (DST): UTC-5 (CDT)
- ZIP code: 73547
- Area code: 580
- FIPS code: 40-30950
- GNIS feature ID: 2412705
- Website: none

Granite is a town in Greer County, Oklahoma, United States. The population was 1,628 at the 2020 census.

== Geography ==
Granite is located in eastern Greer County. State Highways 6 and 9 intersect at the southern end of town; Highway 6 leads north 32 miles (51 km) to Elk City and south 23 miles (37 km) to Altus, while Highway 9 leads east 17 miles (27 km) to Hobart and west then south 13 miles (21 km) to Mangum.

Lake Altus on the North Fork Red River is 2 miles (3 km) east of the center of town. Headquarters Mountain, elevation 1,980 feet (600 m), rises 350 feet (110 m) directly above the north side of town.

According to the United States Census Bureau, the town has a total area of 3.2 square miles (8.4 km^{2}), all land.

== Demographics ==
Historical population
Census	Pop.	Note	%±
1910	1,229		—
1920	912		−25.8%
1930	1,341		47.0%
1940	1,058		−21.1%
1950	1,096		3.6%
1960	952		−13.1%
1970	1,808		89.9%
1980	1,617		−10.6%
1990	1,844		14.0%
2000	1,844		0.0%
2010	2,065		12.0%
2020	1,628		−21.2%
U.S. Decennial Census

=== 2020 census ===
As of the 2020 census, Granite had a population of 1,628. The median age was 39.7 years. 12.8% of residents were under the age of 18 and 11.7% of residents were 65 years of age or older. For every 100 females there were 275.1 males, and for every 100 females age 18 and over there were 326.4 males age 18 and over.

0.0% of residents lived in urban areas, while 100.0% lived in rural areas.

There were 347 households in Granite, of which 31.7% had children under the age of 18 living in them. Of all households, 44.4% were married-couple households, 17.9% were households with a male householder and no spouse or partner present, and 32.9% were households with a female householder and no spouse or partner present. About 31.7% of all households were made up of individuals and 17.3% had someone living alone who was 65 years of age or older.

There were 503 housing units, of which 31.0% were vacant. The homeowner vacancy rate was 9.2% and the rental vacancy rate was 20.3%.

Racial composition as of the 2020 census
Race	Number	Percent
White	1,137	69.8%
Black or African American	227	13.9%
American Indian and Alaska Native	118	7.2%
Asian	0	0.0%
Native Hawaiian and Other Pacific Islander	0	0.0%
Some other race	51	3.1%
Two or more races	95	5.8%
Hispanic or Latino (of any race)	113	6.9%

=== 2000 census ===
As of the census of 2000, there were 1,844 people, 443 households, and 283 families residing in the town. The population density was 1,166.3 inhabitants per square mile (450.3/km^{2}). There were 533 housing units at an average density of 337.1 per square mile (130.2/km^{2}). The racial makeup of the town was 69.47% White, 16.97% African American, 4.93% Native American, 0.38% Asian, 3.85% from other races, and 4.39% from two or more races. Hispanic or Latino of any race were 7.16% of the population.

There were 443 households, out of which 27.1% had children under the age of 18 living with them, 48.8% were married couples living together, 10.4% had a female householder with no husband present, and 36.1% were non-families. 33.9% of all households were made up of individuals, and 18.1% had someone living alone who was 65 years of age or older. The average household size was 2.26 and the average family size was 2.88.

In the town, the population was spread out, with 13.7% under the age of 18, 12.6% from 18 to 24, 43.2% from 25 to 44, 18.3% from 45 to 64, and 12.2% who were 65 years of age or older. The median age was 36 years. For every 100 females, there were 259.5 males. For every 100 females age 18 and over, there were 304.8 males.

The median income for a household in the town was $25,438, and the median income for a family was $30,703. Males had a median income of $23,125 versus $20,368 for females. The per capita income for the town was $12,599. About 13.1% of families and 17.5% of the population were below the poverty line, including 23.0% of those under age 18 and 12.3% of those age 65 or over.

== Local business ==
Willis Granite Products, makers of headstones and monuments is located in Granite.

Granite is also home to Oklahoma State Reformatory, a medium-security corrections facility also boasting some maximum and minimum-security housing for adult male inmates. Located off Oklahoma Highway 9, the 10-acre (40,000 m^{2}) facility has a maximum capacity of 999 inmates.

== Notable people ==
- Mike Brumley, Major League Baseball catcher
- Tony Scarborough, Skydiver and Mayor
