= Quartz Mountain =

Mountain in Oklahoma, United States

- Baldy Peak
- Location within Oklahoma

Highest point
- Elevation: 2,040 ft (620 m)
- Coordinates: 34°54′25″N 99°19′24″W

Geography
- Location: Greer County, Oklahoma, U.S.
- Parent range: Wichita Mountains
- Topo map: USGS Quartz Mountain

Quartz Mountain (also called Baldy Point) is located in Greer County in southwest Oklahoma. It is the namesake of Quartz Mountain Nature Park and the park boundaries enclose its eastern flank. It is near the cities of Mangum, Oklahoma and Altus, Oklahoma. The park is open to the public year-round for rock climbing, hiking, boating, camping, nature observation and photography, and environmental education and interpretation. The mountain overlooks scenic Lake Altus-Lugert.

== Geology ==
Quartz Mountain is one of the westernmost peaks in the Wichita Mountains. In simplest terms, the Wichita Mountains are rocky promontories and rounded hills made of red and black igneous rocks, light-colored sedimentary rocks, and boulder conglomerates. The Wichita Mountains were formed in four distinct geologic episodes.

1. Magmatism induced by continental rifting just prior to and in the Cambrian Period produced the granites and rhyolites (the red rocks), gabbroic rocks, anorthosites, and diabases (the black rocks).
2. Subsidence resulted in burial by sandstones and limestone (the light-colored rocks) during the early Paleozoic.
3. Uplift during the Pennsylvanian Ouachita Orogeny brought these rocks to the surface as mountains.
4. Weathering and erosion during the Permian Period flattened the mountains and produced a mantle of conglomerates.

The mountains are Permian landforms covered and preserved by river-borne sediments in the Permian and partially excavated only in recent geological times. Exposure of these fossil mountains is greatest towards the southeast; much of the western part of the Permian range remains buried under sandstones and shales.

Quartz Mountain is made of granite emplaced during the early Cambrian period. Like the other granite knobs nearby, and the larger masses of granite in the eastern Wichita Mountains, these rocks are part of the Wichita Granite Group. Most of Quartz Mountain and the other exposures in the park are homogeneous pink-red Lugert Granite. However, the flank of Quartz Mountain, and the adjacent peaks to the west are made of a coarser grained, red Reformatory Granite. The Reformatory Granite is quarried locally in and around the appropriately named town of Granite; the park's numerous monuments are polished monoliths of the quarry products. A mixed zone between the two units reveals that these are two separate pulses of magma intruding the same level of the crust, and that the Lugert post-dates the intrusion of the Reformatory. Numerous miarolitic cavities and hydrothermal veins pervade this zone and its surroundings. Both contain appreciable amounts of quartz.

== Climbing ==
Using modern techniques at Quartz Mountain, climbing began in the late 1960s and early 1970s. Between 1978 and 1982, the majority of climbing routes were established. The property where the mountain is located was privately owned by Ted and Margaret Johnson, who had allowed access to the mountain for several decades. To ensure the area was preserved, it was purchased in 2001 by The Access Fund and the Wichita Mountains Climbers Coalition (WMCC), then donated to the State of Oklahoma by Dr. Suzy Spradlin, daughter of Ted and Margaret Johnson. In 2002 the area was designated Quartz Mountain Nature Park.

There is no fee charged to climb the mountain. Activities at Baldy Point are only permitted during the daytime. Climbers must be off the mountain and out of the parking lot by dusk.

One source reports that Quartz Mountain climbing is very strenuous and that this mountain is not recommended for beginners. It has been compared to climbing at Joshua Tree National Park. Most of the climbing is done on the south face of the mountain, so summer is not a recommended time for climbing. Spring and fall are the best times for this activity.

Camping is not allowed at the climbing area (which is normally called Baldy Point area). Camping is available at Quartz Mountain park campground, about 3 miles (4.8 km) from the climbing area, where there are 100 RV hookups plus a number of tent sites. Fires, firearms, paintball guns, mountain bikes, and dirt bikes are prohibited at the climbing area.

== See also ==
- Quartz Mountain Nature Park
- Quartz Mountain Resort Arts and Conference Center
