= Mike Brumley (infielder) =

American baseball player and coach (1962–2024)

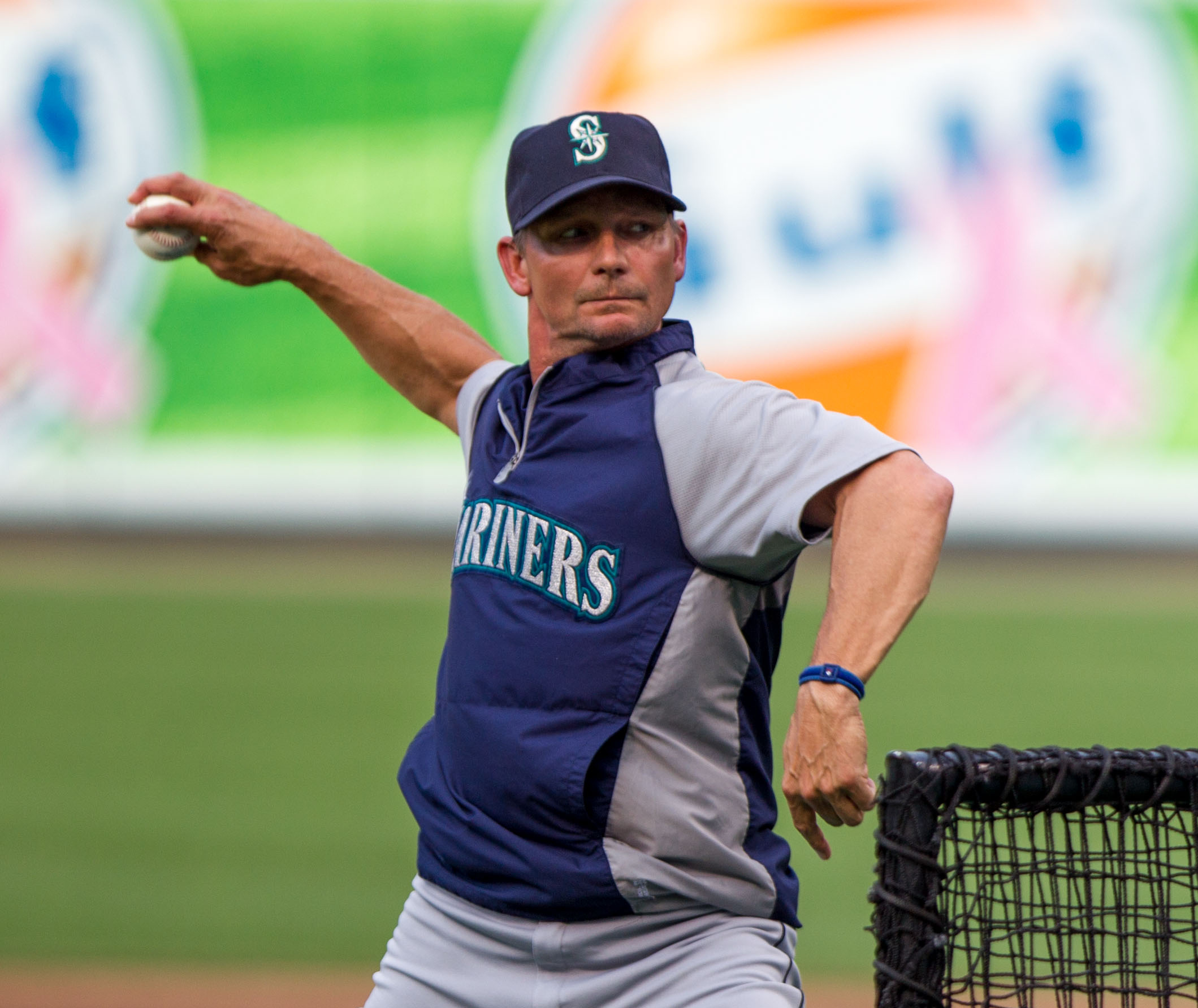
- Brumley pitching batting practice, 2012
- Shortstop
- Born: April 9, 1962; Oklahoma City, Oklahoma, U.S.
- Died: June 15, 2024 (aged 62); Mississippi, U.S.
- Batted: Switch Threw: Right

MLB debut
- June 16, 1987, for the Chicago Cubs

Last MLB appearance
- October 1, 1995, for the Houston Astros

MLB statistics
- Batting average: .206
- Home runs: 3
- Runs batted in: 38
- Stats at Baseball Reference

Teams
- As player: Chicago Cubs (1987); Detroit Tigers (1989); Seattle Mariners (1990); Boston Red Sox (1991–1992); Houston Astros (1993); Oakland Athletics (1994); Houston Astros (1995); As coach: Seattle Mariners (2010–2013); Chicago Cubs (2014)

Anthony Michael Brumley (April 9, 1962 – June 15, 2024) was an American professional baseball utility player in Major League Baseball (MLB), who played primarily as a shortstop. He played from 1987 through 1995 for the Chicago Cubs (1987), Detroit Tigers (1989), Seattle Mariners (1990), Boston Red Sox (1991–1992), Houston Astros (1993, 1995) and Oakland Athletics (1994). Brumley was a coach for the Mariners from 2010 to 2013 and for the Cubs in 2014. He was the son of the catcher Mike Brumley.

== Playing career ==
Brumley attended Southeast High School in Oklahoma City, Oklahoma, for three years. He moved to Tulsa, Oklahoma, and completed high school at Union High School. After graduating, Brumley enrolled at the University of Texas at Austin and played college baseball for the Texas Longhorns. The Boston Red Sox of Major League Baseball (MLB) selected him in the second round of the 1983 MLB draft.

On May 25, 1984, the Red Sox traded Brumley and Dennis Eckersley to the Chicago Cubs for Bill Buckner. The Cubs traded him along with Keith Moreland to the San Diego Padres for Goose Gossage and Ray Hayward on February 12, 1988. Brumley spent one year in the Padres organization but did not play in the major leagues as he was behind Roberto Alomar and Garry Templeton on their depth chart. On March 23, 1989, the Padres traded Brumley to the Detroit Tigers for Luis Salazar.

On January 10, 1990, the Tigers traded Brumley to the Baltimore Orioles for Larry Sheets. He never played a regular season game with the Orioles, who released him on April 3, just six days prior to the start of the 1990 campaign. He signed with the Seattle Mariners to back up Omar Vizquel, but was injured in June and lost playing time after his return to Brian Giles. He signed with the Red Sox for the 1991 season, and also played in the major leagues for the Red Sox in 1992, the Houston Astros in 1993, the Oakland Athletics in 1994, and Houston in 1995.

== Coaching career ==
After his playing career ended, he was the manager of the Salt Lake Stingers from 2002 to 2004, compiling a 202–229 record. From 2005 to 2007 he was the minor league field coordinator for the Texas Rangers. He was the manager of the Ogden Raptors for the 2008 season.

During 2009, Brumley worked in the Los Angeles Dodgers system, overseeing all aspects of instruction in the Dodgers minor league system. The Mariners hired him to serve as the team's third-base coach in 2010, replacing Bruce Hines. Brumley later moved to the first-base coach's box for Seattle. He joined the coaching staff of new Cubs manager Rick Renteria for 2014 as assistant hitting coach but was dismissed from his position at the end of that season.

Brumley was the minor league hitting coordinator for the Atlanta Braves from 2018 to 2022. Austin Riley credited Brumley with helping him to make a significant change to the mental aspect of his at bats, learning to recognize where an off-speed pitch would land, and avoid swinging at the sliders that pitchers had used against him in prior years. Brumley continued to work with Riley on his swing in the years after he stopped working for the Braves.

== Personal life ==
Brumley was the son of Mike Brumley, who played in MLB as a catcher.

Brumley died in a traffic collision near Jackson, Mississippi, on June 15, 2024, at the age of 61. Mike is survived by his wife and four children.

== See also ==
- List of second-generation Major League Baseball players
