= Quartz Mountain Resort Arts and Conference Center =

Resort in Oklahoma

Coordinates: 34°54′17″N 99°18′19″W

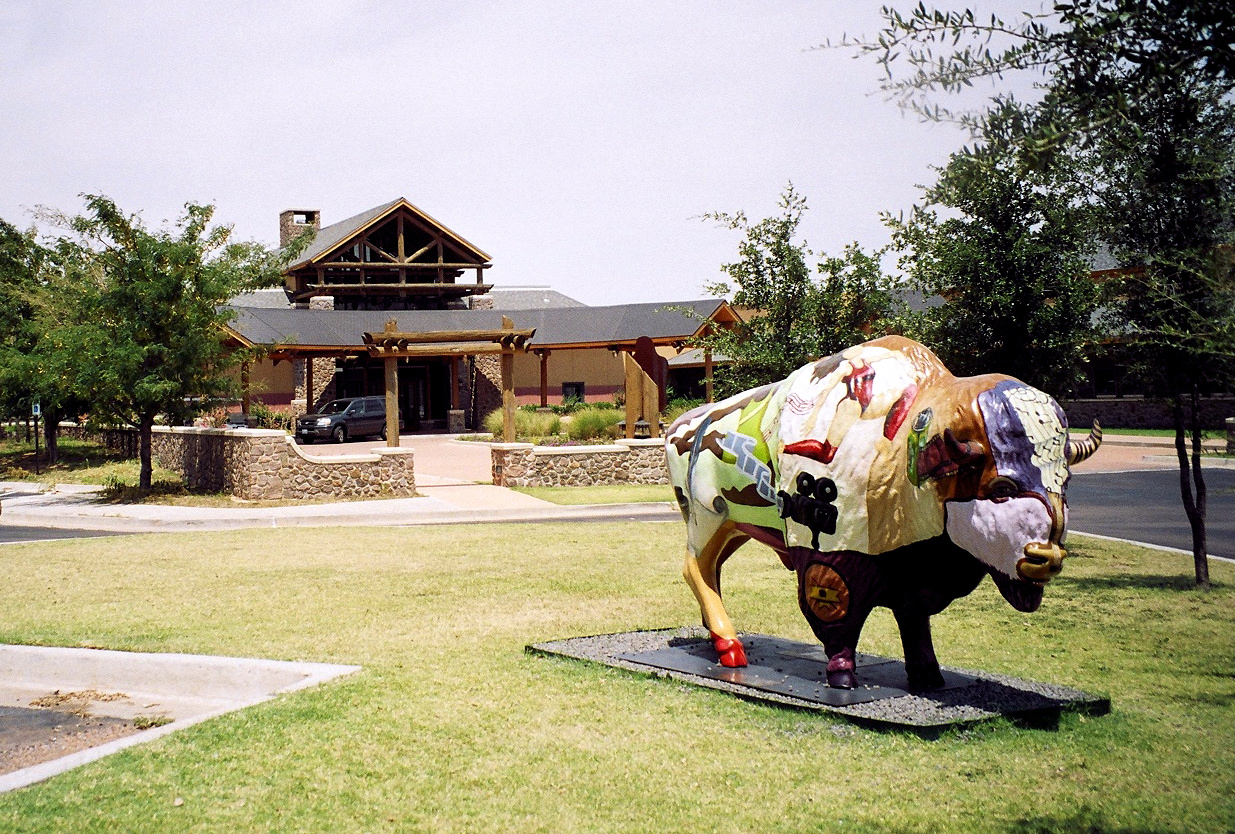
The entrance to the main building at the resort

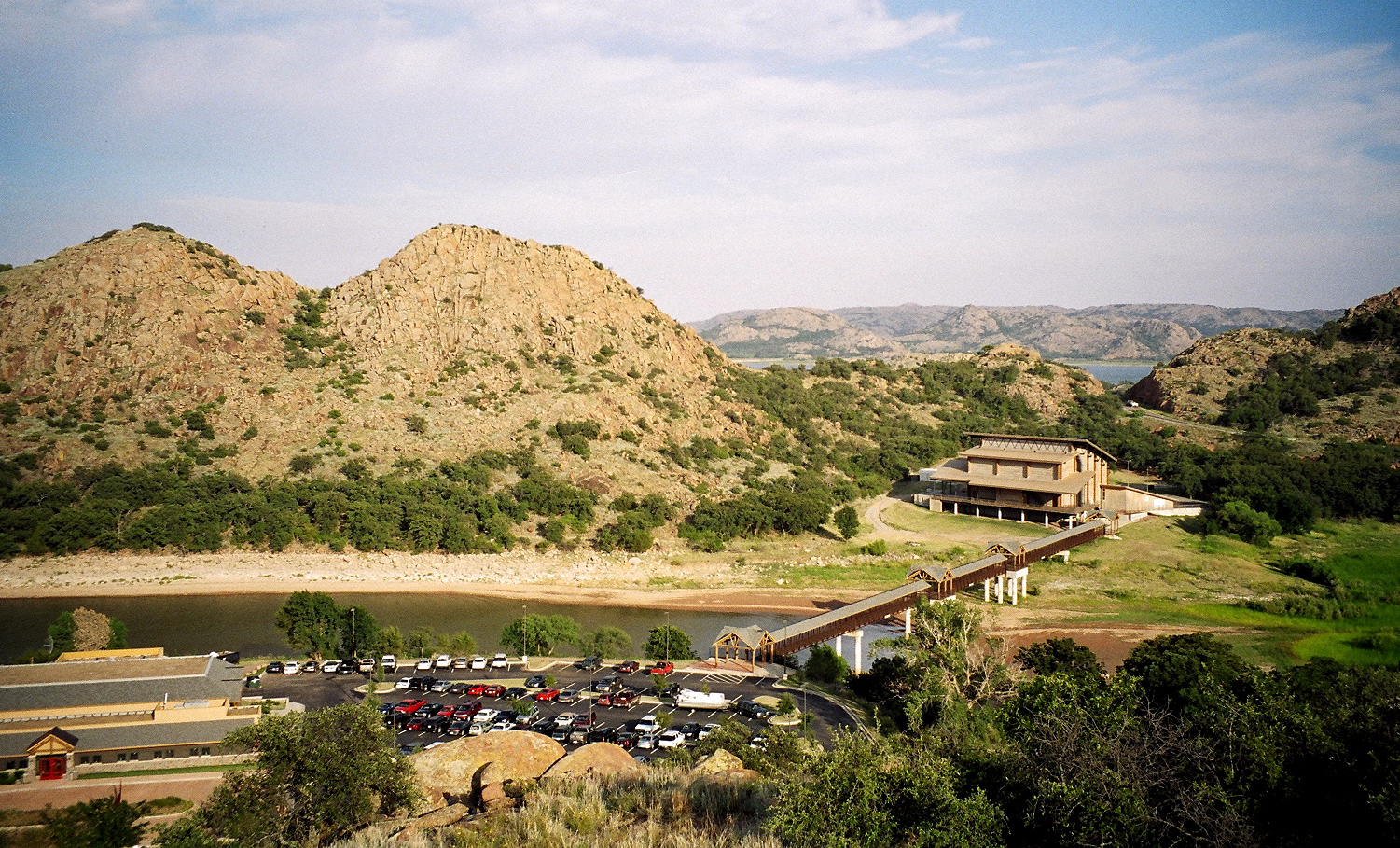
The Twin Peaks Performance Hall as seen overlooking the main building

The Quartz Mountain Resort Arts and Conference Center is a resort located 17 miles north of Altus in the Wichita Mountains of southwestern Oklahoma, United States. It is two and a half hours from Oklahoma City, four hours from Dallas, near the Texas border and 9 miles (14 km) west of Lone Wolf, Oklahoma on State Highway 44A.

== Oklahoma Summer Arts Institute at Quartz Mountain ==
250 students between the ages of 14 and 18 are selected for the annual Oklahoma Summer Arts Institute. They spend two weeks at Quartz Mountain, living in cabins and lodges, focusing on their area of discipline, and studying with well-known artists. According to the Oklahoma Arts Institute website, "The Oklahoma Summer Arts Institute (OSAI) is an intensive academy for Oklahoma high school students in the fields of acting, creative writing, ballet, modern dance, orchestra, chorus, drawing and painting, photography, and film and video. OSAI faculty artists include winners of the Pulitzer Prize and the Academy, Grammy, Emmy, and Tony Awards. You'll join over 250 students from across the state as you study your chosen field and attend or participate in performances, gallery openings, film screenings, poetry readings, and more."

The cost of attendance is very low due to extensive funding by the Oklahoma government and private donors. Some students who qualify only pay a participation fee of $250.

The current disciplines are Acting, Ballet, Chorus, Creative Writing, Drawing & Painting, Film & Video, Modern Dance, Orchestra, and Photography.

== History of Quartz Mountain (Baldy Point) ==
Quartz Mountain's history began due to local recreational climbers. The land was privately owned by Ted and Margaret Johnson, who allowed climbers to legally explore Baldy Point since the early 1970s. Ted died in 1993 and left the land to his wife. After seven years, she needed to sell the property to keep up with her medical bills. Because of the climbing community, the tourists who loved the beautiful Oklahoma land, and Margaret's daughter, on March 30, 2001, the Access Fund and the Wichita Mountains Climbers Coalition were able to purchase Baldy Point. The two partners then immediately donated the land to the State of Oklahoma, and it was dedicated as a part of the Quartz Mountain State Park. As of January 1, 2002, the State Park was renamed Quartz Mountain Nature Park.

== History of the Quartz Mountain Resort Arts and Conference Center ==
The Quartz Mountain Lodge was built in 1955. It included 44 rooms, a tennis court, and two pools: one indoor, and one outdoor. In 1959 a nine-hole golf course was added. In 1970, more construction led to more campgrounds on the north side of the land. Soon after all the construction was completed, the lodge burnt almost completely due to an electrical fire in the sauna area. The resort was forced to close until after the 750-seat theatre was completed in 2001. The total reconstruction cost over seventeen million dollars. In 2002, after Baldy Point was donated to the State of Oklahoma, the Dunnam property was also donated to the cause. In 2003, Quartz Mountain's "Baldy Point Trails" project was awarded $80,000 for construction and improvements.

Currently, the land is used as a conference center and the location of the Oklahoma Summer Arts Institute, and is still a hot spot for tourists and recreational climbers.
