= Lone Wolf, Oklahoma =

- Town
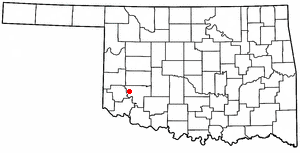
- Location of Lone Wolf, Oklahoma
- Coordinates: 34°59′26″N 99°14′44″W
- Country: United States
- State: Oklahoma
- County: Kiowa

Area
  - Total: 0.52 sq mi (1.35 km^{2})
  - Land: 0.52 sq mi (1.35 km^{2})
  - Water: 0 sq mi (0.00 km^{2})
- Elevation: 1,562 ft (476 m)

Population (2020)
  - Total: 373
  - Density: 717.2/sq mi (276.91/km^{2})
- Time zone: UTC-6 (Central (CST))
  - Summer (DST): UTC-5 (CDT)
- ZIP code: 73655
- Area code: 580
- FIPS code: 40-43850
- GNIS feature ID: 2412911

Lone Wolf is a town in Kiowa County, Oklahoma, United States. As of the 2020 census, Lone Wolf had a population of 373. The town was named for Chief Lone Wolf (1843–1923), a warrior chief of the Kiowa who fought to preserve his people's autonomy and way of life.

== History ==
The town of Lone Wolf was founded in August 1901, on the opening of the Kiowa-Comanche-Apache Reservation to settlement. It was located along the Chicago, Rock Island and Pacific Railroad. The population was 307 at the time of statehood in 1907. From its inception, Lone Wolf's economy has been supported by agriculture, specifically wheat farms nearby.

== Geography ==
According to the United States Census Bureau, the town has a total area of 0.5 square miles (1.3 km^{2}), all land.

Lake Altus-Lugert is about 6 miles southwest.

=== Climate ===
Climate data for Lone Wolf, Oklahoma
Month	Jan	Feb	Mar	Apr	May	Jun	Jul	Aug	Sep	Oct	Nov	Dec	Year
Mean daily maximum °F (°C)	48.7 (9.3)	53.9 (12.2)	63.8 (17.7)	74.1 (23.4)	82.1 (27.8)	90.4 (32.4)	96 (36)	94.3 (34.6)	85.6 (29.8)	75.2 (24.0)	61.6 (16.4)	51.5 (10.8)	73.1 (22.8)
Mean daily minimum °F (°C)	24.0 (−4.4)	29.1 (−1.6)	37.7 (3.2)	48.5 (9.2)	58.0 (14.4)	67.3 (19.6)	72.4 (22.4)	70.6 (21.4)	62.4 (16.9)	49.8 (9.9)	37.7 (3.2)	27.8 (−2.3)	48.8 (9.3)
Average precipitation inches (mm)	0.8 (20)	1.2 (30)	1.7 (43)	1.9 (48)	4.4 (110)	3.7 (94)	1.9 (48)	2.4 (61)	3.4 (86)	2.7 (69)	1.4 (36)	0.9 (23)	26.4 (670)
Source 1: weather.com
Source 2: Weatherbase.com

== Demographics ==
Historical population
Census	Pop.	Note	%±
1910	677		—
1920	657		−3.0%
1930	1,023		55.7%
1940	783		−23.5%
1950	660		−15.7%
1960	617		−6.5%
1970	584		−5.3%
1980	613		5.0%
1990	576		−6.0%
2000	500		−13.2%
2010	438		−12.4%
2020	373		−14.8%
U.S. Decennial Census

=== 2020 census ===
As of the 2020 census, Lone Wolf had a population of 373. The median age was 45.7 years. 24.1% of residents were under the age of 18 and 23.1% of residents were 65 years of age or older. For every 100 females there were 98.4 males, and for every 100 females age 18 and over there were 93.8 males age 18 and over.

0.0% of residents lived in urban areas, while 100.0% lived in rural areas.

There were 148 households in Lone Wolf, of which 30.4% had children under the age of 18 living in them. Of all households, 49.3% were married-couple households, 18.2% were households with a male householder and no spouse or partner present, and 25.7% were households with a female householder and no spouse or partner present. About 28.4% of all households were made up of individuals and 17.6% had someone living alone who was 65 years of age or older.

There were 219 housing units, of which 32.4% were vacant. The homeowner vacancy rate was 0.0% and the rental vacancy rate was 23.7%.

Racial composition as of the 2020 census
Race	Number	Percent
White	318	85.3%
Black or African American	4	1.1%
American Indian and Alaska Native	25	6.7%
Asian	0	0.0%
Native Hawaiian and Other Pacific Islander	0	0.0%
Some other race	12	3.2%
Two or more races	14	3.8%
Hispanic or Latino (of any race)	23	6.2%

=== 2000 census ===
As of the census of 2000, there were 500 people, 222 households, and 148 families residing in the town. The population density was 962.5 inhabitants per square mile (371.6/km^{2}). There were 263 housing units at an average density of 506.3 per square mile (195.5/km^{2}). The racial makeup of the town was 91.20% White, 0.60% African American, 3.80% Native American, 1.60% from other races, and 2.80% from two or more races. Hispanic or Latino of any race were 4.80% of the population.

There were 222 households, out of which 27.9% had children under the age of 18 living with them, 50.5% were married couples living together, 12.6% had a female householder with no husband present, and 32.9% were non-families. 30.6% of all households were made up of individuals, and 14.4% had someone living alone who was 65 years of age or older. The average household size was 2.25 and the average family size was 2.78.

In the town, the population was spread out, with 24.4% under the age of 18, 9.0% from 18 to 24, 24.6% from 25 to 44, 23.2% from 45 to 64, and 18.8% who were 65 years of age or older. The median age was 40 years. For every 100 females, there were 89.4 males. For every 100 females age 18 and over, there were 84.4 males.

The median income for a household in the town was $24,808, and the median income for a family was $32,000. Males had a median income of $25,972 versus $21,750 for females. The per capita income for the town was $13,525. About 15.4% of families and 20.6% of the population were below the poverty line, including 24.2% of those under age 18 and 15.9% of those age 65 or over.

=== Banat Bulgarian settlement ===
According to Veselin Traykov's study of Bulgarian emigration to North America, there was a Roman Catholic Banat Bulgarian settlement in Lone Wolf, established mainly through immigration from Romania in the 1920s and 1930s, with the Banat Bulgarians engaging primarily in farming.
