= Access Fund =

Non-profit US rock climbing advocacy group

- Type: Advocacy group
- Tax ID no.: 94-3131165
- Location: Boulder, CO
- Region served: United States
- Revenue: $2,025,000 (2015)
- Expenses: $2,022,000 (2015)
- Website: accessfund.org

Access Fund is a not-for-profit rock climbing advocacy group in the US. Their goals are twofold. First, keeping climbing areas open and gaining access to currently closed climbing areas. Second, they promote an ethic of responsible climbing and conservation of the climbing environment. Access Fund was originally the access committee of the American Alpine Club and was created as the climbing community realized the need for an organization to represent climbing and climbers' rights in the US.

Access Fund became its own 501(c)3 organization in 1991. The organization is based out of Boulder, Colorado and has a small full-time staff. Additionally, Access Fund has a nationwide network of volunteers and local climbing organizations that work locally to keep climbing areas open and preserved for future climbers.
