= Yakso Falls =

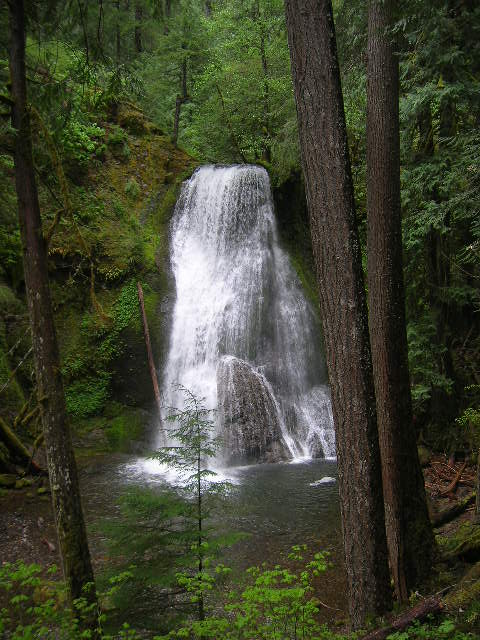
- Yakso Falls
- Interactive map of Yakso Falls
- Location: Cascade Range east of Roseburg in the U.S. state of Oregon
- Coordinates: 43°13′29″N 122°42′56″W
- Type: fan split by a large basalt outcrop near the base
- Elevation: 3,100 feet (940 m)
- Total height: 70 feet (21 m)
- Total width: 25 feet (7.6 m)
- Watercourse: Little River
- Average flow rate: 50 cubic feet per second (1.4 m^{3}/s)

Yakso Falls is a 70-foot (21 m) waterfall on Little River, in the Cascade Range east of Roseburg in the U.S. state of Oregon. The waterfall is about 27 miles (43 km) from the unincorporated community of Glide along Little River Road (County Road 17), which becomes Forest Road 27.

In Chinook Jargon, yakso means "hair". The waterfall is said to resemble the long hair of a woman.

Yakso Falls Trail, 0.7 miles (1.1 km) long, leads from Lake in the Forest Campground in Umpqua National Forest to the waterfall. The trail, open year-round, passes through selectively logged old-growth forest.

Other waterfalls in the vicinity include Hemlock Falls, Middle Hemlock Falls, and Upper Hemlock Falls (also known as Clover Falls), all on nearby Hemlock Creek, a Little River tributary. Additional falls within 5 miles (8.0 km) of Yakso Falls are Tributary Falls on an unnamed tributary of Hemlock Creek; Cedar Creek Falls on Cedar Creek; Flat Rock Falls on the Flat Rock branch of Clover Creek, and Grotto Falls on Emile Creek. Like Hemlock Creek, Cedar, Clover, and Emile creeks are tributaries that enter Little River downstream of Yakso Falls.
