= Lake Altus-Lugert =

Lake in Oklahoma, United States

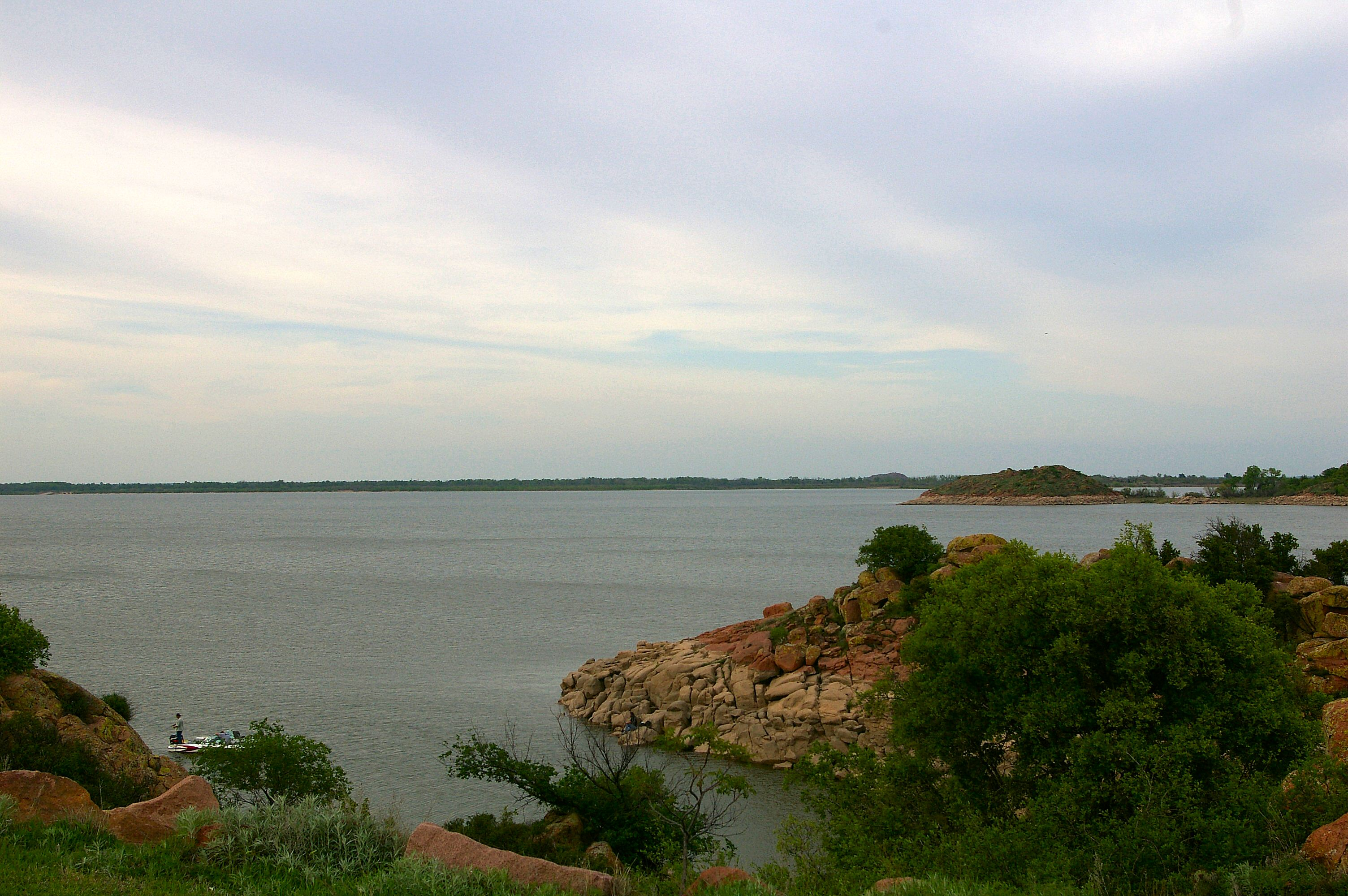
- Lake Altus-Lugert, looking east

- Location within Oklahoma Location within the United States
- Location: Greer / Kiowa counties, Oklahoma, United States
- Coordinates: 34.9251°N 99.3023°W
- Primary inflows: North Fork Red River
- Primary outflows: North Fork Red River
- Basin countries: United States
- Surface area: 6,260 acres (25.3 km^{2})
- Average depth: 21 ft (6.4 m)
- Max. depth: 71 ft (22 m)
- Water volume: 132,830 acre⋅ft (163,840,000 m^{3})
- Shore length^{1}: 49 mi (79 km)
- Surface elevation: 1,547 ft (472 m)
- Settlements: Altus, Oklahoma
- ^{1} Shore length is not a well-defined measure.

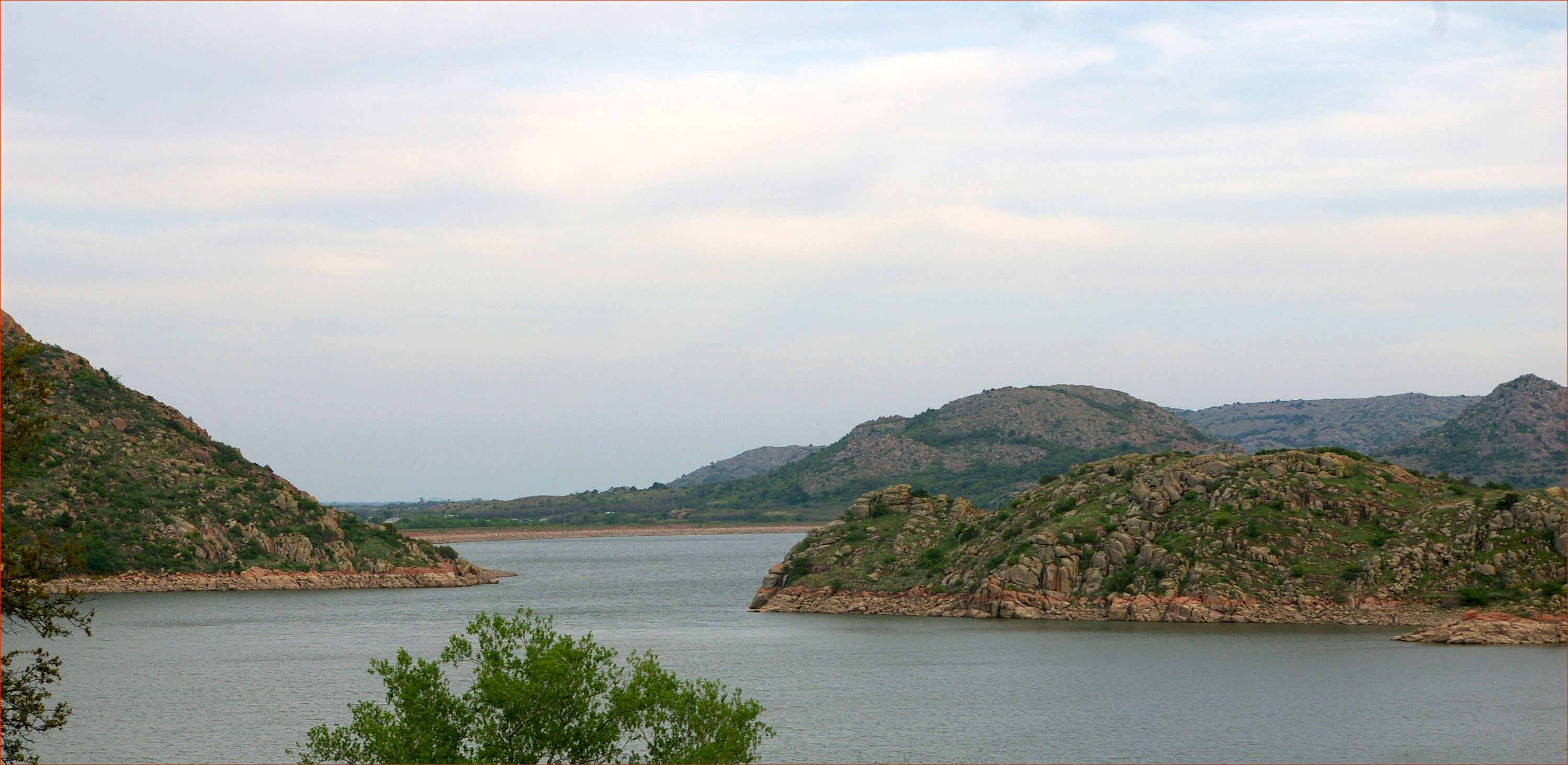
Lake Altus-Lugert, looking south

Lake Altus-Lugert, also known as Lake Altus, Lake Lugert, Lake Lugert-Altus, and Lugert Lake, is a reservoir located on the North Fork Red River, about 17 miles (27 km) north of Altus, Oklahoma on the former site of the town of Lugert, Oklahoma. The river is the boundary between Greer County and Kiowa County, Oklahoma. The lake is used for fishing, boating, swimming, and irrigation. This is also the principal water supply for Altus.

== History ==
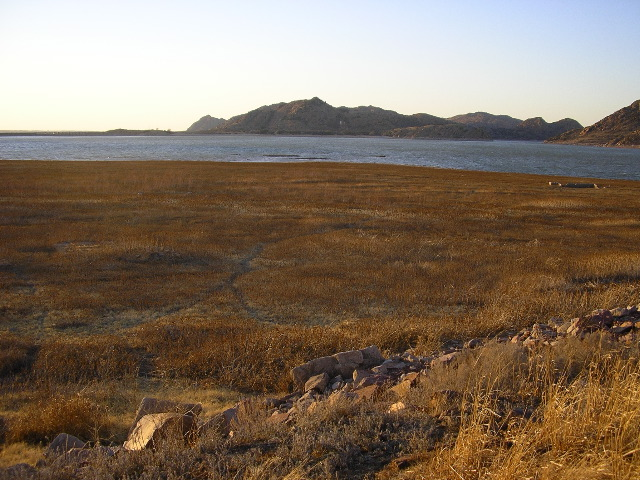
Foundations from the town of Lugert at the bottom of Lake Altus-Lugert

Lake Lugert was created over the former town of Lugert (founded in 1902) which was destroyed by a tornado on April 27, 1912. One can see the old foundations of the houses which used to stand in the area. Layers of brick and weeds dominate the area making it hard to walk through when the lake is dry. The town was hit by a tornado several times leaving the town to only rebuild. Later after the last tornado hit the town, the towns people decided to leave, abandoning the entire town. Lake Altus has been expanded to include the town of Lugert, also creating Lake Lugert.

Lake Altus-Lugert is the primary storage facility for the W.C. Austin Project of the U.S. Bureau of Reclamation. This project provides irrigation water to some 48,000 acres (190 km^{2}) of land located in southwestern Oklahoma.

Lake Altus had its beginnings in 1927 when the city of Altus, Oklahoma built Altus Dam as a source of municipal water for the city. Interest in providing irrigation water to farmers in the region prompted the U.S. Government to authorize construction of a larger reservoir in the Rivers and Harbors Act of 1938. The dam was to be raised 50 feet (15 m) to impound more water. Construction started in 1941, and was interrupted by World War II. Construction resumed in 1944. The dam, as it stands today, was completed in 1947.

There is also an extensive system of canals leaving Lake Altus in order to deliver the irrigation water to farmland. Most of these canals and distribution laterals were completed by 1953.

An 8-year drought that had largely depleted the lake ended in the Spring of 2015, when storms delivered 17.1 inches (43 cm) of rain in 60 days. (Note: The drought had caused the lake to drop to 9 percent of its normal capacity by April 2015, when the rainfall began.) The heavy rains caused local flooding and property damage in the Quartz Mountain Nature Park. The Altus Dam flood gates had to be opened to relieve excess water, after the lake reached its normal capacity.

== Dam ==
Altus Dam is a concrete gravity, partially curved structure faced with granite masonry except on the downstream face of the overflow section. The dam is 110 feet (34 m) above foundation and 1,104 feet (336 m) long. It contains 70,200 cubic yards (54,000 m^{3}) of concrete and masonry. Incorporated within the dam section are both controlled and uncontrolled overflow-type spillways and an irrigation outlet works which delivers water into the project canal system. The 58,000 cubic foot per second (1,600 m^{3}/s) spillway is regulated by nine radial gates. Lake Altus has a total capacity of 154,092 acre-feet (190,070,000 m^{3}), of which 1,663 acre-feet (2,051,000 m^{3}) are dead storage, 19,597 acre-feet (24,173,000 m^{3}) are flood control storage, and 132,832 acre-feet (163,846,000 m^{3}) are conservation storage. The last 10,000 acre-feet (12,000,000 m^{3}) of conservation storage is reserved for municipal water for Altus, Oklahoma. Appurtenant reservoir structures are Lugert, East, North, and South Dikes, located at low places on the reservoir rim. Lugert Dike, the largest, is 4,245 feet (1,294 m) long and has a maximum height of 45 feet (14 m).

== Recreation ==
Lake Altus, in the scenic Quartz Mountains, offers year-round recreation. The north portion of the reservoir area is managed for wildlife benefits by the Oklahoma Department of Wildlife Conservation. This includes a total water surface area of over 6,500 acres (26 km^{2}), and a land area of over 4,000 acres (16 km^{2}).

Many types of recreational activity are allowed on and around the lake. Water skiing, jet skiing and swimming are allowed. Fishing is quite popular. The most prevalent species of fish are: black bass, catfish, crappie, hybrid bass, sand bass, walleye and white bass. This lake holds the record for the largest walleye and hybrid bass caught in Oklahoma.

The Quartz Mountain Nature Park is located at the west edge of the reservoir. Public recreation facilities of all types are available, including an 18-hole golf course, lodging at Quartz Mountain Resort, Arts & Conference Center, grocery store, organized group camps, recreation-vehicle pads, tent spaces, two swimming beaches, boat launching ramps, trailer spaces, campgrounds, picnic areas with shelters and tables, drinking water, restrooms, hiking trails, and access roads with parking. Fishing and hunting are popular, as well as picnicking, sightseeing, and many water sport activities.

== Quartz Mountain Resort, Arts & Conference Center ==
The first Quartz Mountain Lodge was built on the west side of Lake Altus in 1955. An electrical fire in 1995 destroyed most of the structure, what remained was demolished in 1998 so that reconstruction could begin. The new Quartz Mountain Lodge was completed in 2001.

Quartz Mountain Resort, Arts & Conference Center consists of a main lodge facility offering 118 rooms, a performance center, outdoor amphitheater and 11 cabins. The lodge was recently rebuilt after a fire destroyed the original lodge. Once reconstruction was completed, ownership of the lodge was transferred from the Oklahoma Tourism & Recreation Department to the Regents for Higher Education who manages the property currently. The lodge rooms are decorated in western, Native American and southwestern decor and each features four pieces of original artwork. The lodge contains a large collection of art created by professional artists and the gifted students who attend the Quartz Mountain Arts Institute each summer.

== Golden algae fish kill (2013-2015) ==
Oklahoma Department of Wildlife Conservation biologists announced in 2013 that the lake was essentially dead as a fishery. After conducting a four-day survey in April 2013, using electrofishing and gill netting, they found no live fish. They estimated that toxic golden algae had killed more than 350,000 fish over a three-month period. The department then began stocking the lake with shad and sunfish, so that a good forage base could be established. When it appeared that a solid population of forage fish was present, the restocking began with largemouth bass, crappie, walleye and channel catfish. But sampling conducted in May 2015 showed the lake was virtually lifeless again, apparently as a result of another golden algae bloom in the summer of 2014. Nevertheless, given the heavy rains in May 2015 that refilled the lake and lowered its salt content, the department stated its efforts to re-establish a viable fishery in Lake Altus-Lugert would continue. In 2017, Fisheries Chief Barry Bolton reported that the Altus-Lugert fishery had recovered quickly, and that Altus-Lugert was once again a fishing destination in southwestern Oklahoma.
