= Overholser =

Overholser may refer to:

== People ==
- Henry Overholser (1846–1915), American businessman
- Ed Overholser (1869–1931), American politician and former mayor of Oklahoma City
- Geneva Overholser, American journalist
- Wayne D. Overholser (1906–1996), American writer
- Winfred Overholser (1892–1964), American psychiatrist

== Places ==
- Lake Overholser, Oklahoma, United States
- Overholser Mansion, Oklahoma, United States
