= Hawk & Parr =

American architectural firm

Practice information
- Founders: J. W. Hawk; J. O. Parr
- Founded: 1914
- Location: Oklahoma City

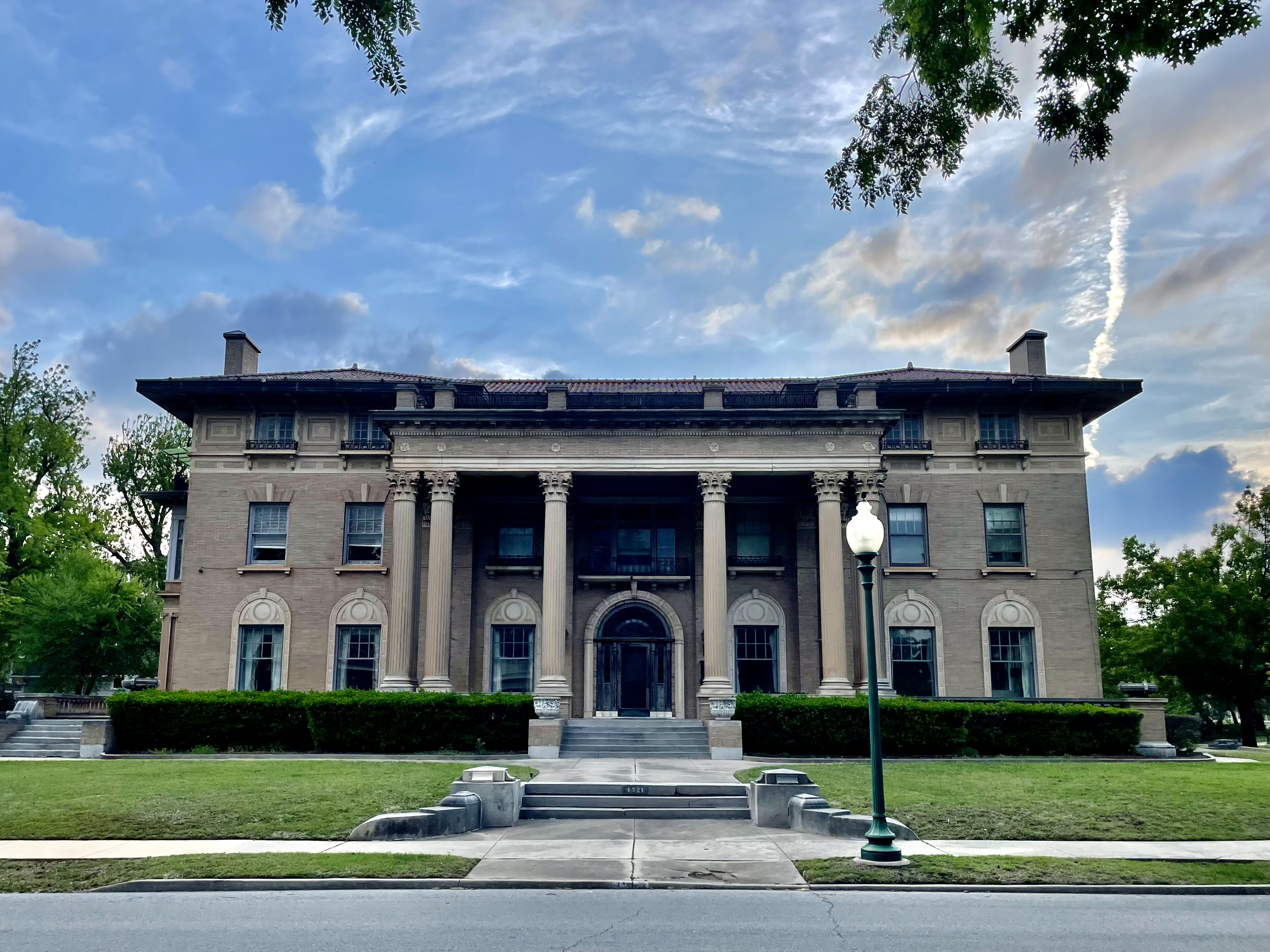
The Hales Mansion in Oklahoma City, designed by Hawk & Parr in the Italian Renaissance Revival style and completed in 1916.

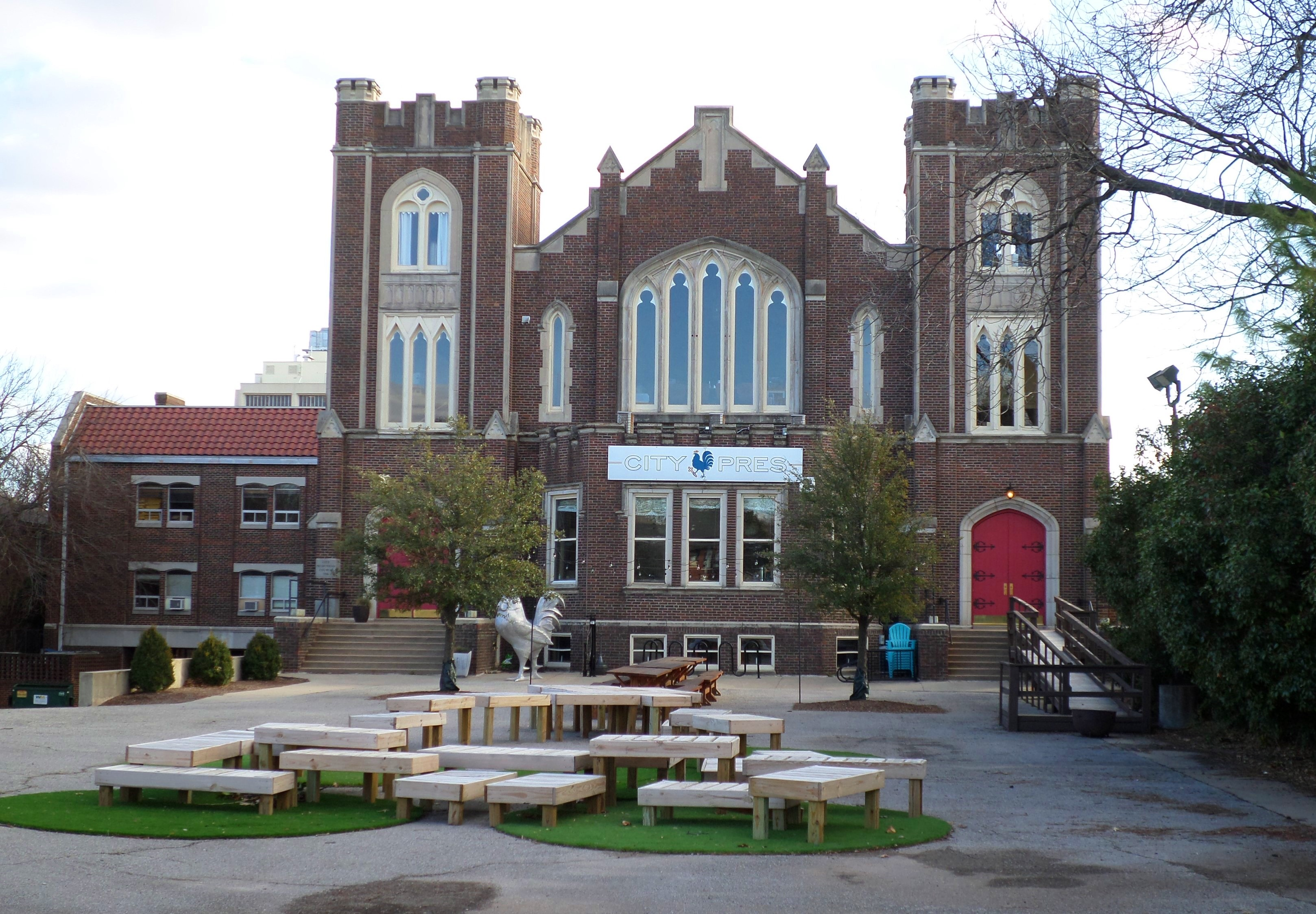
The City Presbyterian Church in Oklahoma City, designed by Hawk & Parr in the Gothic Revival style and completed in 1920.

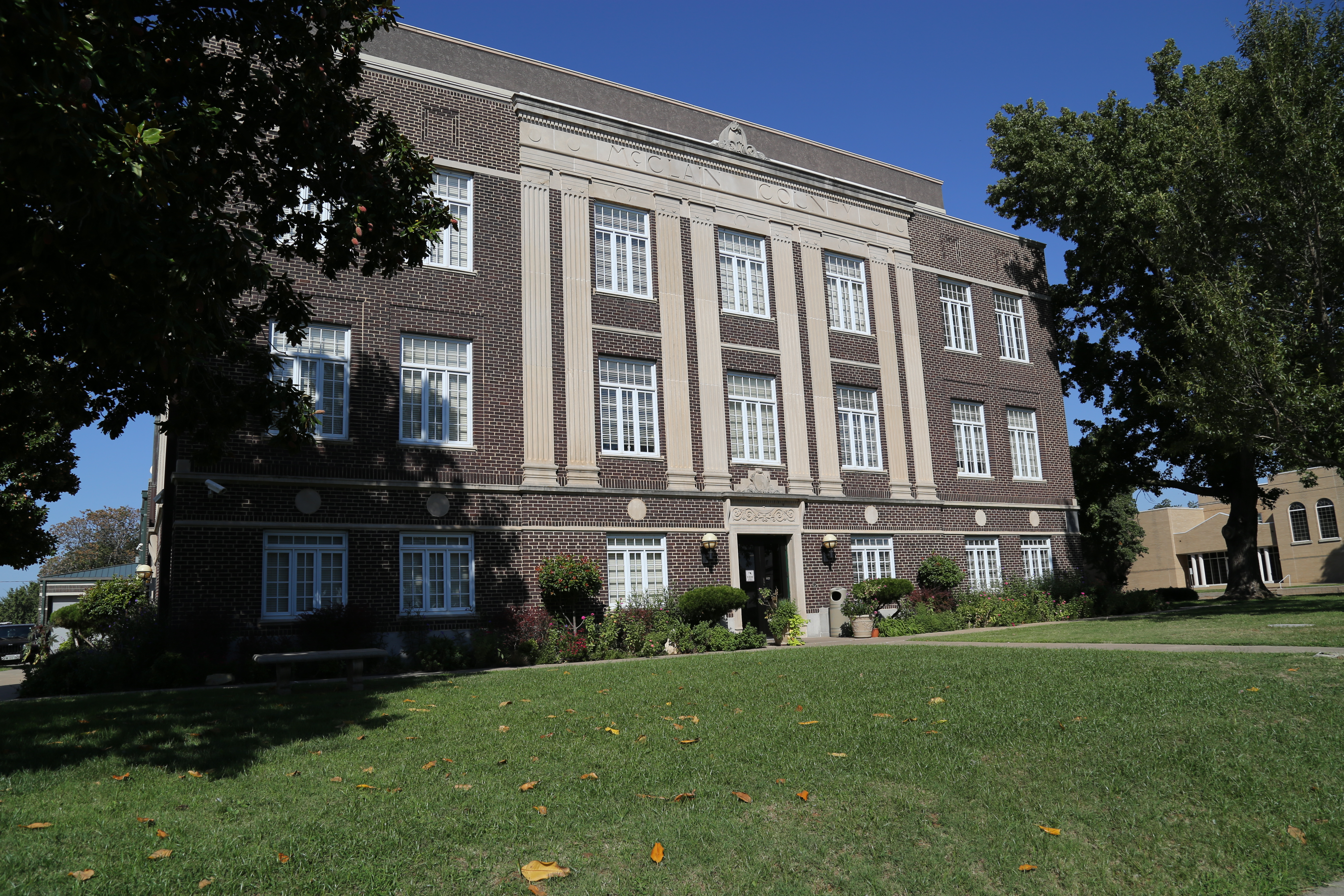
The McClain County Courthouse in Purcell, designed by Hawk & Parr in the Colonial Revival style and completed in 1928.

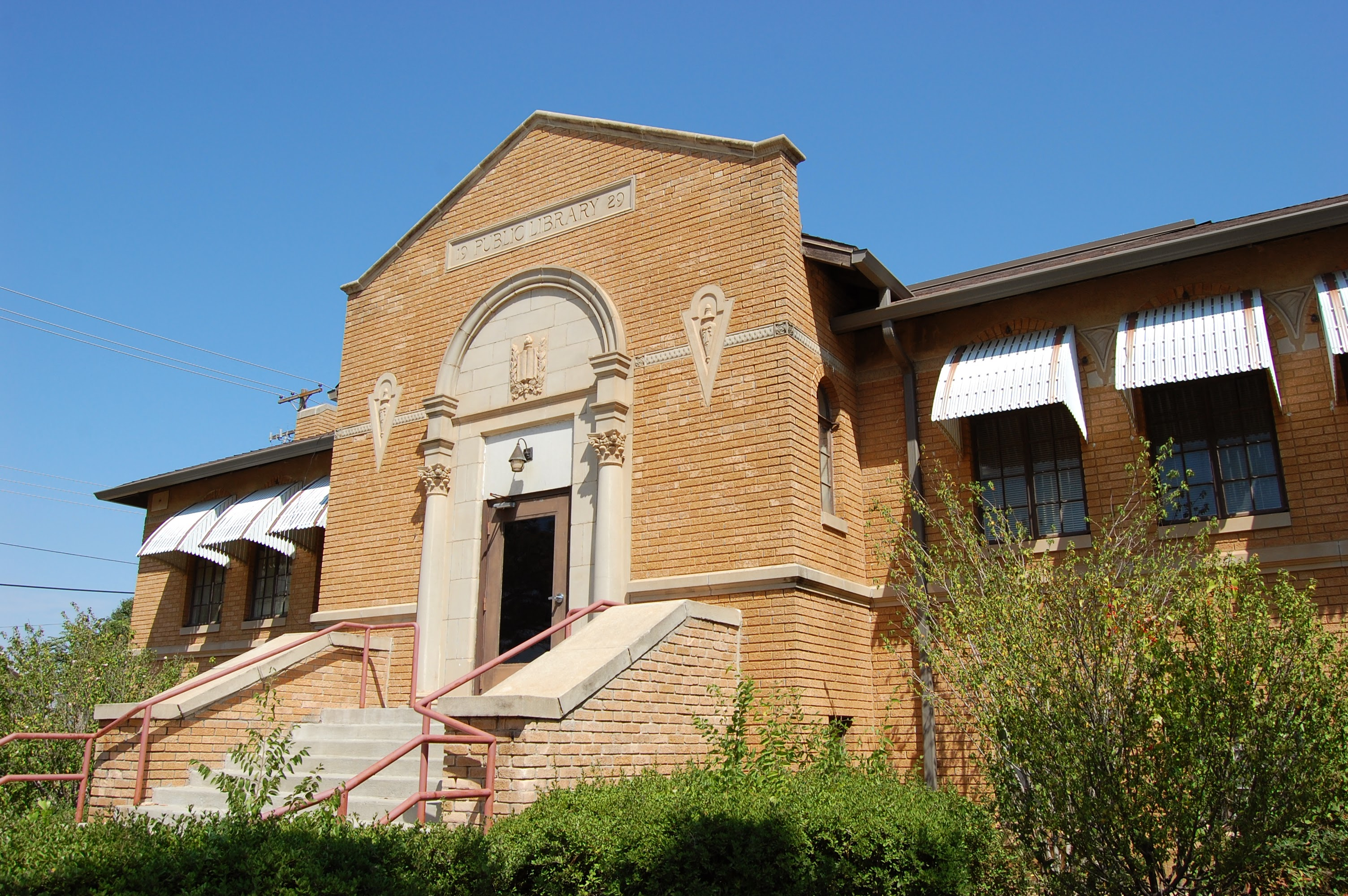
The former Norman Public Library in Norman, designed by Hawk & Parr in the Italian Renaissance Revival style and completed in 1929.

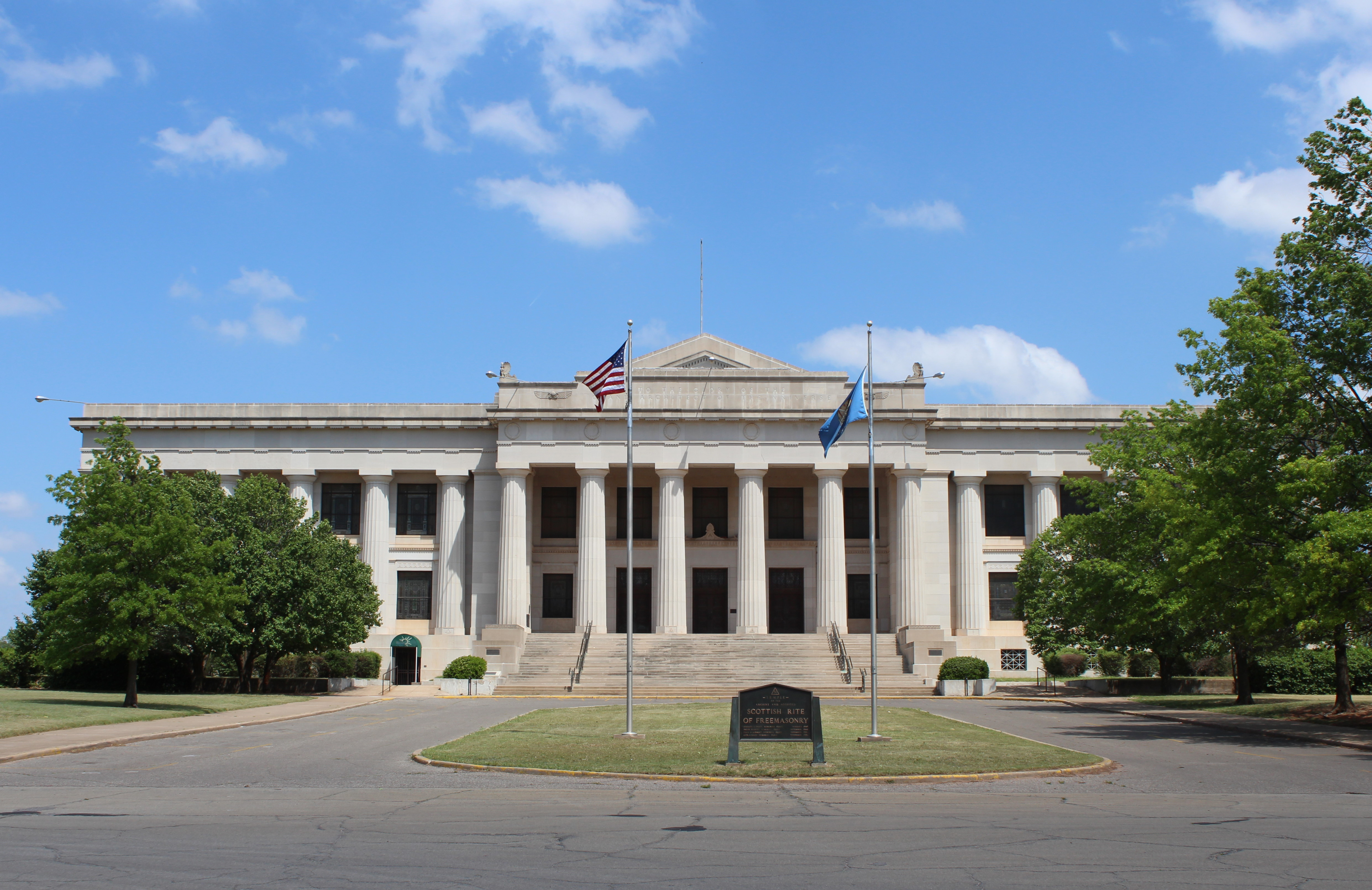
The Scottish Rite Temple in Guthrie, designed by Hawk & Parr in the Classical Revival style and completed in 1929.

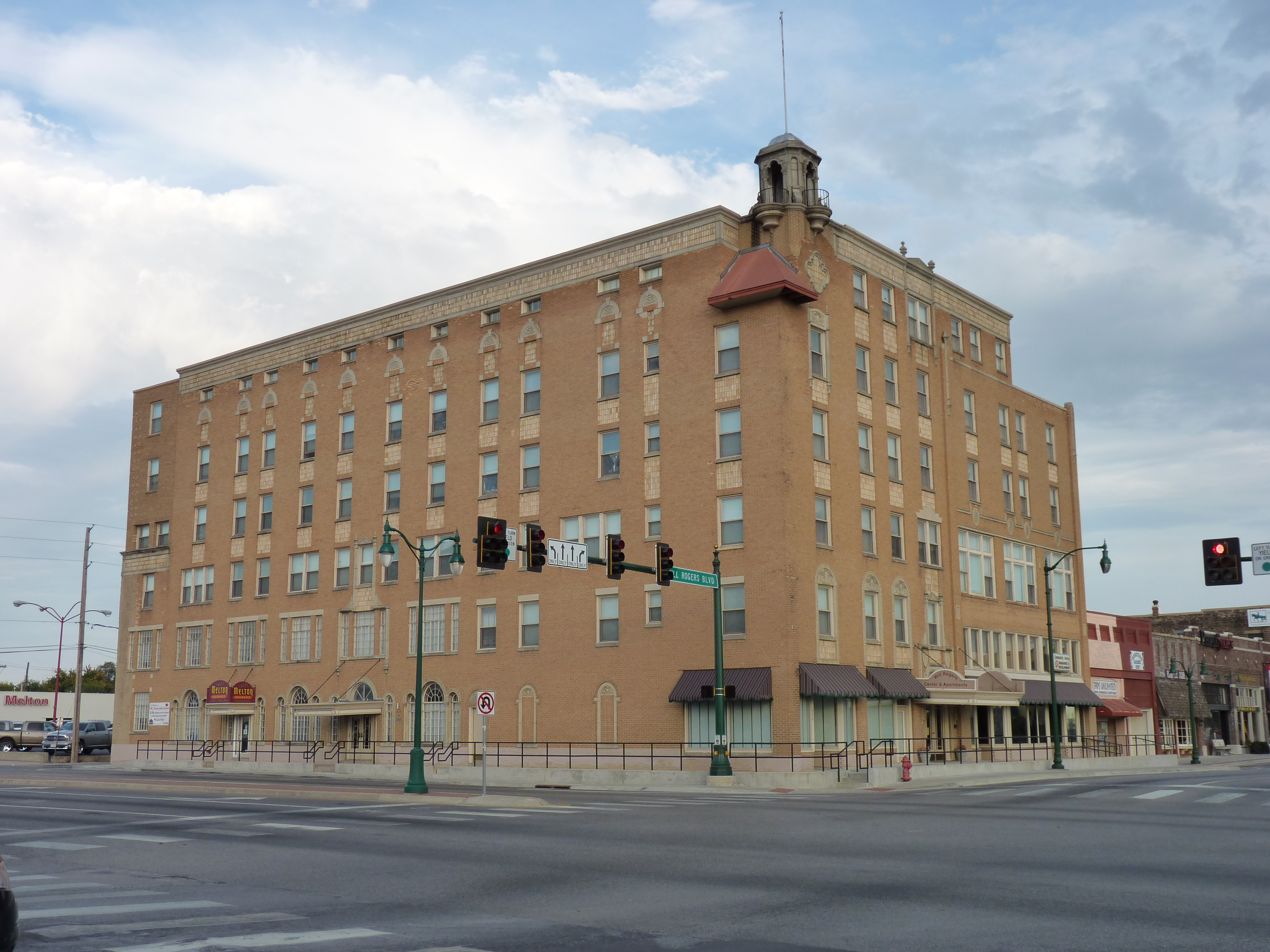
The Will Rogers Hotel in Claremore, designed by Hawk & Parr in the Spanish Colonial Revival style and completed in 1930.

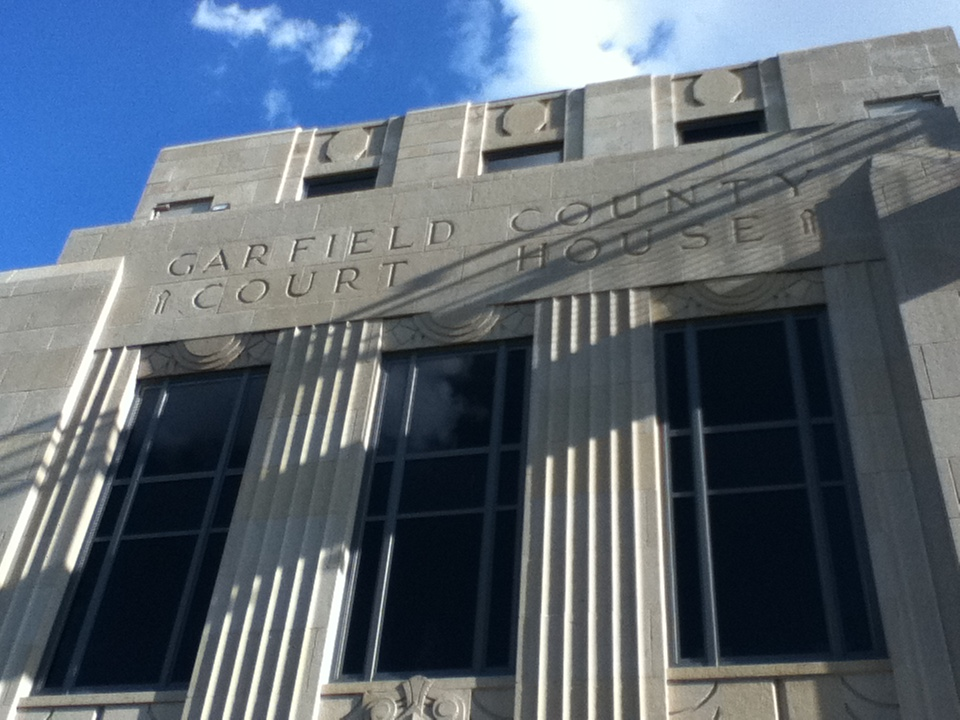
The Garfield County Courthouse in Enid, designed by Hawk & Parr in the Art Deco style and completed in 1936.

Hawk & Parr was an American architectural firm active in Oklahoma City. It was formed in 1914 as the merger of the offices of architects J. W. Hawk and J. O. Parr. After the retirement of Hawk in 1932 and the death of Parr in 1940, it was led by Parr's son into the 1980s.

== History ==
Hawk & Parr was formed in 1914 as the partnership of architects J. W. Hawk and J. O. Parr. Hawk had been in practice in Oklahoma City since 1899, Parr since 1910. Hawk retired from practice in 1932, but Parr continued to practice under the Hawk & Parr name until his death in 1930.

After Parr's death, the firm was reorganized as Parr, Frye & Aderhold by William G. Parr, his son, Harvey D. Frye and George Aderhold. In 1941 it became Parr & Aderhold. Aderhold withdrew from the firm in 1961 to become architectural director for the Federal Bureau of Prisons. Parr briefly worked alone before forming the partnership of Parr & Watkins with Dudley Watkins in 1962. Parr returned to independent practice in 1967. He practiced into the 1980s and died in 1994.

== Biographies of partners ==
=== J. W. Hawk ===
James Watson Hawk (March 26, 1864 – December 21, 1947) was born in Kenton, Ohio, to Jacob Hawk and Mary A. Hawk, née Cambell. Circa 1869 the family moved to Kirksville, Missouri, where Jacob Hawk worked as an architect and builder. Hawk was educated in the Kirksville public schools and at the First District Normal School, now Truman State University. He was trained as an architect in offices in Omaha, Nebraska and in Kansas City and St. Joseph, Missouri. He settled in Oklahoma City in 1899.

Before forming Hawk & Parr, Hawk practiced independently and as a member of four other partnerships. The first, Hawk & Van Meter, was formed in 1902 with George W. Van Meter, a recent graduate of the University of Illinois. This was dissolved in 1904. The second, Hawk & Wells, was formed in early 1905 with William A. Wells. This was dissolved when Wells was appointed building commissioner in July. The third, Hawk & Collignon, was formed in early 1907 with George W. Collignon of Birmingham, Alabama. This, too, was dissolved before the end of the year. In 1909 Hawk combined his office with that of Layton & Smith, forming Layton, Wemyss-Smith & Hawk, commonly known as Layton, Smith & Hawk. With this firm, Hawk completed the Beckham County Courthouse (1911) in Sayre. This was dissolved in 1911. He then practiced independently until joining Parr.

Hawk was married in 1892 to Harriet E. Coffey in Albany, Missouri. They had one child, a daughter. Mrs. Hawk died in 1930, shortly before his retirement. In retirement Hawk briefly lived in Arkansas and Louisiana before returning to Oklahoma City. About the time of the outbreak of World War II he moved into the Masonic Home for the Aged in Guthrie, the building of which had been completed by Hawk & Parr in 1926. He died there at the age of 83.

=== J. O. Parr ===
Josephus Overton Parr AIA (February 17, 1877 – January 26, 1940) was born in rural Denton County, Texas to Josephus Constantine Parr, a farmer and Confederate veteran, and Elizabeth Parr, née Bridges. He was educated at the North Texas Normal College, now the University of North Texas, and at the Armour Institute, now the Illinois Institute of Technology. Parr joined the office of architect E. C. Smith in Denison. In 1905 he became a partner in the firm of Smith & Parr and opened a second office for the firm in McAlester, Oklahoma. The partners moved to Oklahoma City in 1910. The work of this firm includes Troutt Hall (1911) of the University of Science and Arts of Oklahoma and the Winfield Public Carnegie Library (1912) in Winfield, Kansas. Circa 1912 the partnership was dissolved, and Parr continued alone until joining Hawk.

Parr was married in 1907 to Ida Gamble in McLean. They had five children, two sons and three daughters. He was a member of the American Institute of Architects (AIA) and local fraternal organizations. He died in Oklahoma City at the age of 62, following complications from a fall.

== Legacy ==
The firm designed many buildings that are listed on the U.S. National Register of Historic Places. Its Mission/Spanish Revival style Casa Grande Hotel, for example, was built in 1928 and was listed on the National Register in 1995.

== Architectural works ==
- Besse Hotel, 121 E. 4th St., Pittsburg, KS (Hawk & Parr), NRHP-listed
- Biltmore Hotel, Oklahoma City, OK, no longer surviving
- Casa Grande Hotel, 103 E. Third St., Elk City, OK (Hawk and Parr), NRHP-listed
- Commerce Exchange Building, Oklahoma City, OK, no longer surviving
- Concert Hall (Now part of the Seratean Center for the Performing Arts), Oklahoma A&M College, Stillwater, OK (J.W. Hawk)
- Cornelsen Hotel, Fairview, Okla, 121 East Broadway, Fairview, Okla. (Hawk & Parr) 1928-29
- Cotton-Exchange Building, 218 N. Harvey St., Oklahoma City, OK (Hawk & Parr), NRHP-listed
- Engineering Building (renamed Gundersen Hall), Oklahoma A&M College, Stillwater, OK (J.W. Hawk, successor to Hawk & Cook, Architects & Engineers)
- Farmers National Bank, Oklahoma City, OK, no longer surviving
- Garfield County Courthouse, W. Broadway, Enid, OK (Hawk & Parr), NRHP-listed
- W. T. Hales House, 1521 N. Hudson Ave., Oklahoma City, OK (Hawk & Parr), NRHP-listed
- Harbour-Longmire Building, 420 W. Main St., Oklahoma City, OK (Hawk & Parr), NRHP-listed
- Hightower Building, 105 N. Hudson, Oklahoma City, OK (Hawk, J.W. and Parr, J.O.), NRHP-listed
- Magnolia Petroleum Building, 722 N. Broadway St., Oklahoma City, OK (Hawk & Parr), NRHP-listed
- Noble County Courthouse, 300 Courthouse Drive, Perry, Oklahoma, NRHP-listed
- McClain County Courthouse, Courthouse Sq., Purcell, OK (Hawk & Parr), NRHP-listed
- Norman Public Library, 329 S. Peters Ave., Norman, OK (Hawk and Parr), NRHP-listed
- Oklahoma Club, Oklahoma City, OK, no longer surviving
- One or more works in Oklahoma College for Women Historic District, Roughly bounded by Grand Ave., 19th St., Alabama Ave., and alley west of 15th St., Chickasha, OK (Smith & Parr), NRHP-listed
- Perrine Building, Oklahoma City, OK, built 1927
- Pilgrim Congregational Church, 1433 Classen Dr., Oklahoma City, OK (Hawk & Parr), NRHP-listed
- Plaza Court, 1100 Classen Dr., Oklahoma City, OK (Hawk & Parr), NRHP-listed
- Will Rogers Hotel, 524 W. Will Rogers Blvd., Claremore, OK (Hawk and Parr), NRHP-listed (Note: No longer a hotel, has been renovated for use as senior citizens apartments. See Claremore, Oklahoma)
- Scottish Rite Temple, 900 E. Oklahoma, Guthrie, OK (Parr & Hawk), NRHP-listed
- Tonkawa Lodge No. 157 A.F. & A.M., 112 N. 7th St., Tonkawa, OK (Hawk & Parr), NRHP-listed
- Tradesman's National Bank, Oklahoma City, OK, built 1921
- Winfield Public Carnegie Library, 1001 Millington St., Winfield, KS (Parr, J.D.), NRHP-listed
