= Sam Murphy =

Sam Murphy is the name of:

- Samantha Leshnak Murphy (born 1997), American soccer player
- Sam Murphy (rugby league) (born 1981), Australian rugby league player

== See also ==
- Samantha Murphy (disambiguation)
- Sam R Murphy Wildlife Management Area
- Samuel Murphy, American politician
