= Heritage Hills, Oklahoma City =

Heritage Hills
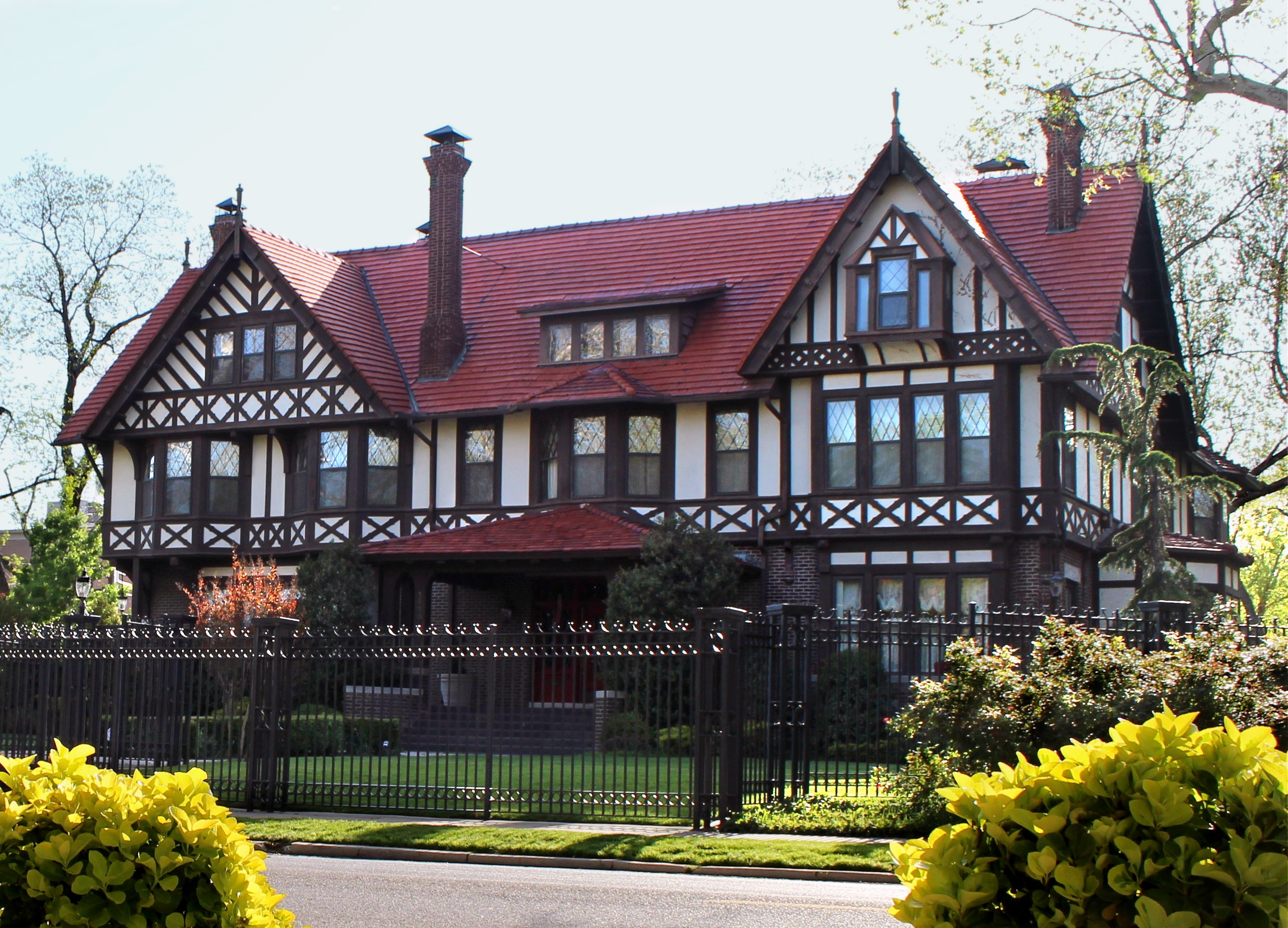
- 1415 North Hudson Avenue
- Interactive map of Heritage Hills
- Coordinates: 35.48599°N 97.51892°W
- Country: United States
- State: Oklahoma
- Counties: Oklahoma
- City: Oklahoma City

Area
  - Total: 0.24 sq mi (0.62 km^{2})
  - Land: 0.24 sq mi (0.62 km^{2})
  - Water: 0.0 sq mi (0 km^{2})

Population (2020)
  - Total: 1,189
  - Density: 4,954.2/sq mi (1,912.8/km^{2})
- ZIP code: 73103
- Area code: Area code 405
- Website: www.heritagehills.org

- Heritage Hills Historic & Architectural District
- U.S. National Register of Historic Places
- Location within Oklahoma Location within the United States
- Location: Oklahoma City, Oklahoma
- Area: 187.5 acres (75.9 ha)
- Built: 1903
- Architect: Multiple
- Architectural style: Multiple
- NRHP reference No.: 79002006
- Added to NRHP: June 4, 1979

Heritage Hills is a historic neighborhood near downtown Oklahoma City. It is known for its historic homes and mansions, some of which are the largest in the city, and the annual Heritage Hills Historic Homes and Gardens Tour. The area is home to Henry Overholser's Overholser Mansion as well as the Hales Mansion. Heritage Hills is bordered by Mesta Park to the west and north, Heritage Hills East to the east, and Midtown to the south.

== History ==
Heritage Hills is Oklahoma City's first historic preservation district. The name "Heritage Hills" was acquired in 1969 and the neighborhood is a conglomerate of several additions with development beginning just after 1900 and largely complete by 1930. Additions that make up Heritage Hills are Harndale, West Highland Parked Addition, Colcord Heights Addition, Classen's Highland Parked Addition, Winan's Highland Addition, and Winan's Second Addition. The establishment of Heritage Hills as a historic preservation district began when leaders from these neighborhood associations came together to form the Historic Preservation Commission to fight the widening proposal of NW 16th Street. These additions were collectively once known as "Highland Park" and "The Highlands" in advertisements from 1902 and 1904 respectively. The Overholser Mansion was the first mansion to begin construction and was, at the time, located away from the city.

== Architecture ==
Single-family detached houses are the dominant structures in Heritage Hills, with multi-family housing to a lesser extent. Various styles of architecture are represented throughout the neighborhood, including Châteauesque, Italian Renaissance Revival, Prairie School, Greek Revival, Neoclassical, American Craftsman, Colonial/Georgian Revival, Mission Revival, Tudor Revival, American Foursquare, and Dutch Colonial Revival.

Heritage Hills' largest house, and largest in Oklahoma City, is the Hales Mansion, spanning 20,021 square feet (1,860.0 m^{2}). The Châteauesque-style Overholser Mansion, the neighborhood's second largest house, is a historic house museum and is open to the public with guided tours.

Located to the southwest adjacent to Heritage Hills is the Gaylord-Pickens Museum, home to the Oklahoma Hall of Fame and located in the Neoclassical-style, former headquarters of Mid-Continent Life Insurance Company, built in 1926.

== Demographics ==
There are 493 households in Heritage Hills with a total population of 1,188. The racial make-up is 86.5% White, 1.0% Black, 1.7% Native American, 6.1% Asian, 3.6% two or more races, and 1.1% some other race. 1.9% of the total population is Hispanic or Latino of any race.

The median household income is $141,875.

The educational attainment of adults 25 years and older with a Bachelor's degree or higher is 81.1%

== Politics ==
Heritage Hills is located in a politically Democratic area, being represented by Democrats Ellen Pogemiller in the Oklahoma House of Representatives (District 88) and Mark Mann in the Oklahoma Senate (District 46). Al McAffrey, who lives in the adjacent Mesta Park neighborhood, was the state's first LGBT person to be elected to the Oklahoma Legislature, representing House District 88 from 2006 to 2012, and then representing Senate District 46 from 2012 to 2015. Kay Floyd, the state's first lesbian to be elected to the state legislature, succeeded McAffrey both in the House and Senate.

The precinct in which Heritage Hills is located within voted 61.4% for Hillary Clinton in the 2016 United States Presidential election, while voting only 28.7% for Donald Trump, and 9.9% for Gary Johnson.

== Notable residents ==
- John Fischer, judge on the Oklahoma Court of Civil Appeals
- Kay Floyd, State Senator
- Henry Overholser (1846-1915), businessman and contributor to early development of Oklahoma City
- Charles F. Urschel (1890-1970), oil tycoon
- Jack C. Walton (1881-1948), 18th mayor of Oklahoma City and fifth governor of Oklahoma
