= McClain County Courthouse =

- U.S. National Register of Historic Places
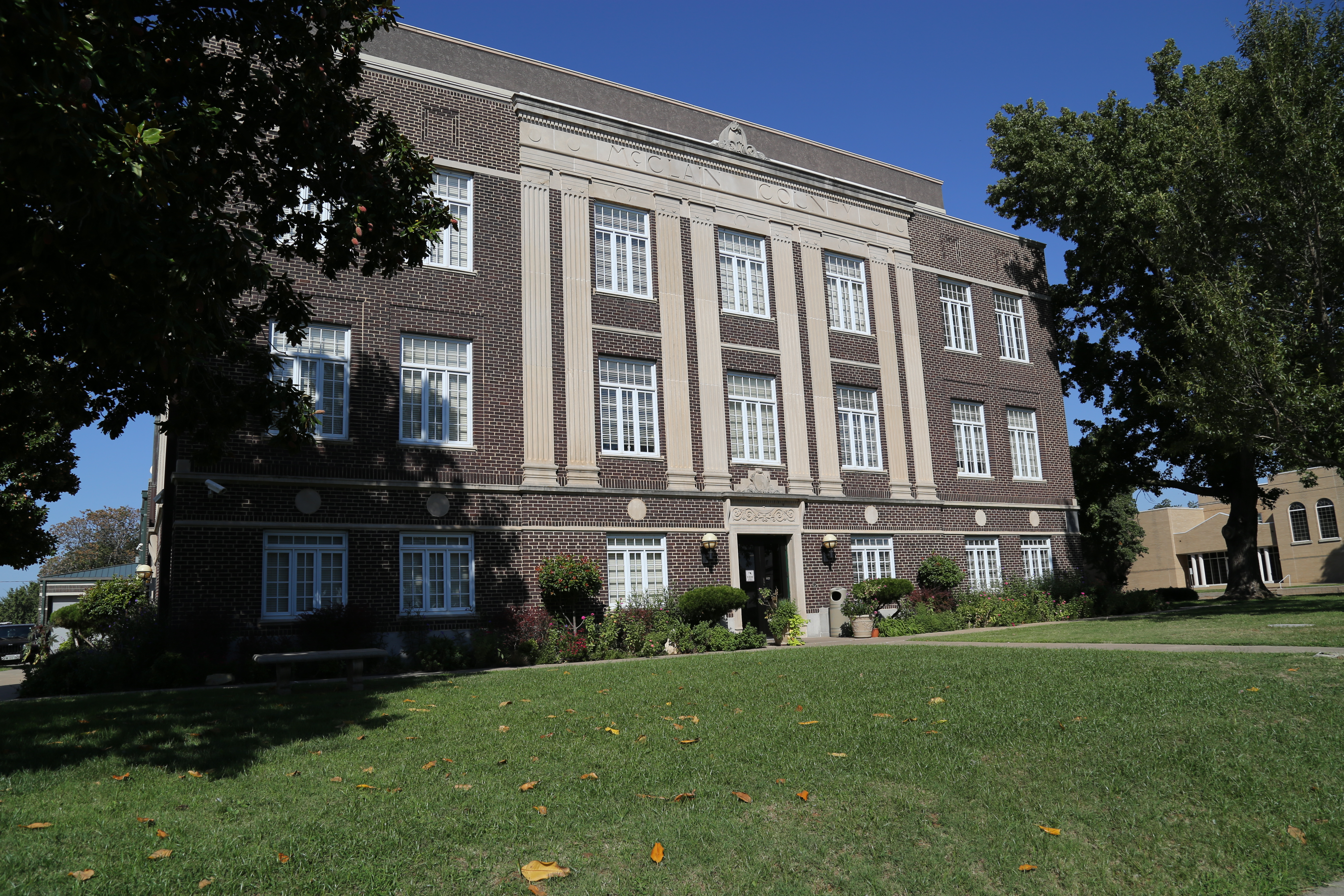

- Location within Oklahoma Location within the United States
- Interactive map showing the location of McClain County Courthouse
- Location: Courthouse Sq., Purcell, Oklahoma
- Coordinates: 35°00′47″N 97°21′40″W
- Area: 1 acre (0.40 ha)
- Built: 1928
- Built by: Cowen Bros.
- Architect: Hawk & Parr
- MPS: County Courthouses of Oklahoma TR
- NRHP reference No.: 84003347
- Added to NRHP: August 23, 1984

The McClain County Courthouse, on Courthouse Sq. in Purcell, Oklahoma, was built in 1928. It was listed on the National Register of Historic Places in 1984.

It was designed by architects Hawk & Parr. It is a three-story almost square red brick courthouse with a flat roof. A jail built of reinforced group forms a jail in a partial attic story. The building has, on each side, a composition of four pairs of pilasters framing three windows on the second and third floors.

It was deemed "significant because of the important role it has played in local government since its construction was completed in 1928. It also gains architectural significance from its unusual design which utilizes paired, fluted pilasters in centered facades. Such a use of classical architectural elements serves to enhance the otherwise functional appearance of this public building. The courthouse is a landmark and a vital center of activity in McClain County."
