= Samantha Murphy =

Samantha Murphy may refer to:

- Samantha Leshnak Murphy (born 1997), American soccer player
- Disappearance of Samantha Murphy

== See also ==
- Sam Murphy (disambiguation)
