= Guthrie Scottish Rite Museum =

Coordinates: 35°52′41″N 97°24′49″W

The Guthrie Scottish Rite Museum is a museum in Guthrie, Oklahoma, at the Scottish Rite Temple, which claims to be one of the world's largest Masonic Centers. It includes collections displaying items from many of the various Masonic orders, such as the Scottish Rite, the Order of the Eastern Star, and the International Order of the Rainbow for Girls.

The building was built in 1919 in Classical Revival style and is listed on the U.S. National Register of Historic Places in 1987.

== See also ==
- List of museums in Oklahoma
