= Tonkawa Lodge No. 157 A.F. & A.M. =

- U.S. National Register of Historic Places
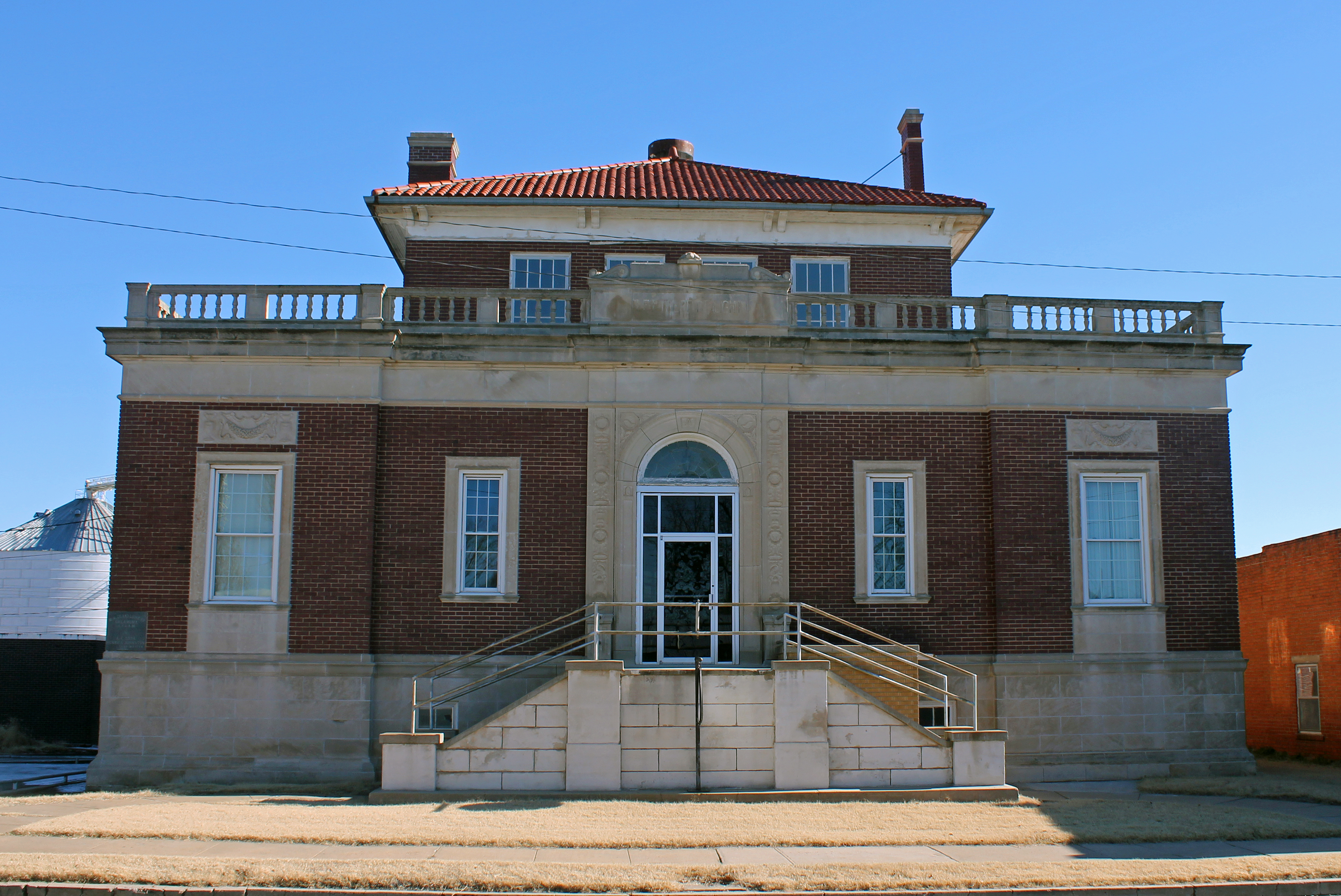

- Location within Oklahoma
- Location: 112 N. 7th St., Tonkawa, Oklahoma
- Coordinates: 36°40′45″N 97°18′28″W
- Area: less than one acre
- Built: 1924-25
- Architect: Hawk & Parr
- Architectural style: Classical Revival
- NRHP reference No.: 07000910
- Added to NRHP: September 6, 2007

Tonkawa Lodge No. 157 A.F. & A.M., at 112 N. 7th St. in Tonkawa, Oklahoma, was listed on the National Register of Historic Places in 2007.

It is a two-story red brick building, built in 1924 to 1925 and is Classical Revival in style. It was designed by Oklahoma City architects Hawk & Parr.
