= City Presbyterian Church =

Historic church in Oklahoma, United States

- Pilgrim Congregational Church
- U.S. National Register of Historic Places
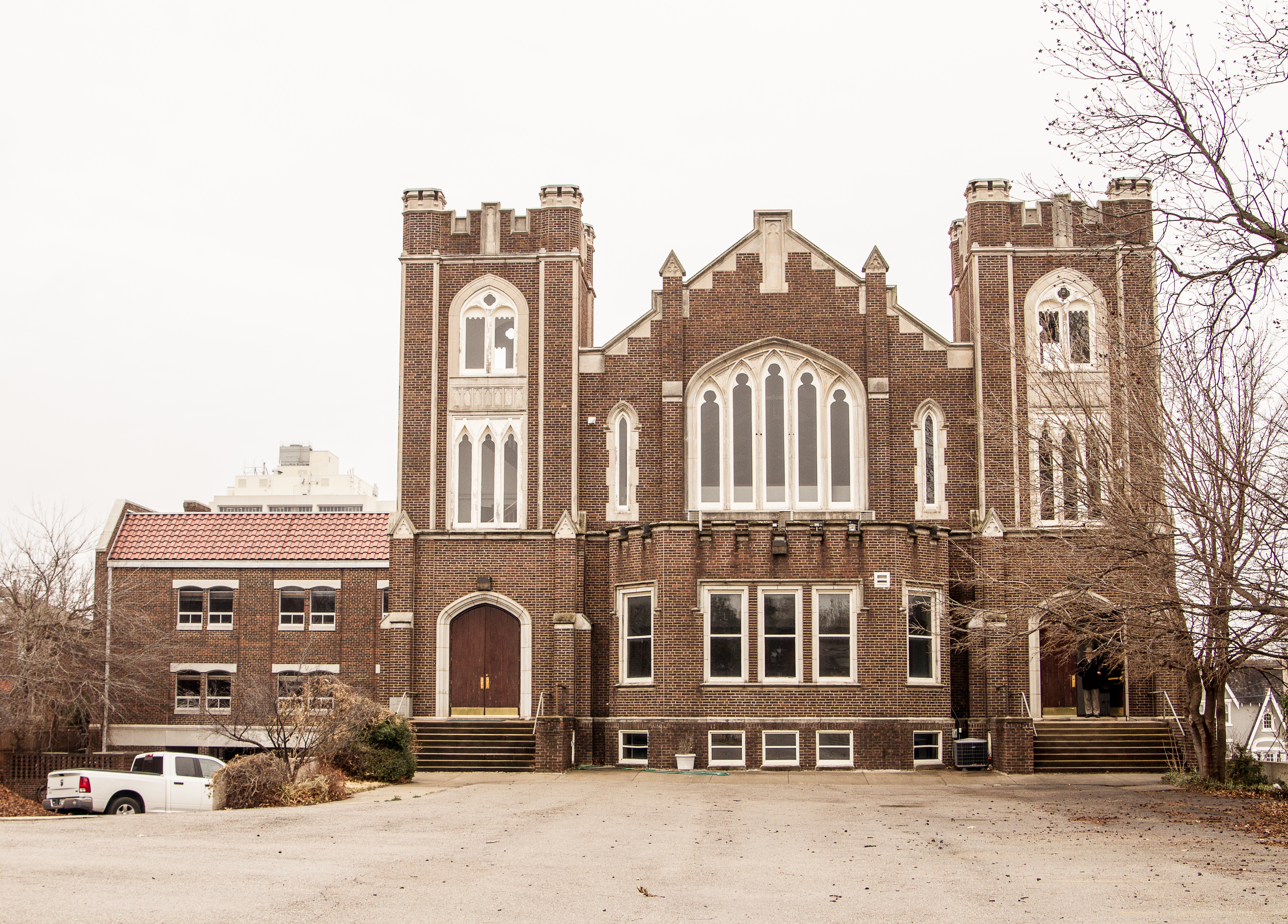

- Location within Oklahoma Location within the United States
- Location: 1433 Classen Drive; Oklahoma City, Oklahoma
- Coordinates: 35°29′0.24″N 97°31′37.07″W
- Built: 1920
- Architect: Hawk & Parr
- Architectural style: Late Gothic Revival
- NRHP reference No.: 84003389
- Added to NRHP: 1984

City Presbyterian Church (originally Park Congregational Church and later Pilgrim Congregational Church) is a church located in Oklahoma City, Oklahoma, United States. The current congregation has no direct connection to the one which originally occupied the building. The building sits on a lot bound by 13th Street and Classen Drive, and therefore has two different street addresses. The "front" (main entrance) of the church is at 1433 Classen Drive, but the address listed on church literature and used for mail delivery is 829 NW 13th Street. The congregation, which informally calls itself "City Pres," is affiliated with the Presbyterian Church in America.

== Building history ==
Originally called Park Congregational Church, the church was designed by the Oklahoma City architectural firm Hawk & Parr and built in 1920, of red brick and limestone in Late Gothic Revival style. The name of the congregation was changed to Pilgrim Congregational Church soon after, and the building was known by this name for most of its history. During its heyday the church was the place of worship for many of Oklahoma City's civic leaders, including The Oklahoman's publisher E.K. Gaylord. From 1924 to 1935 the church was led by Frank Milton Sheldon, who wrote a number of religious texts, later became the minister at Milwaukee's NRHP-listed Grand Avenue Congregational Church, and was described by the Milwaukee Journal as "one of America's best known ministers". The congregation was later absorbed into Oklahoma City's Mayflower Community Church, a member of the United Church of Christ, and sold the property to a local architect in the late 1970s. The architect used part of the property for offices while renting out the main worship space for religious functions, then attempted unsuccessfully to convert part of the space to residential use before selling it in 1989. The building was added to the National Register of Historic Places in 1984, but fell into disrepair under subsequent ownership. In 2000 the building was purchased by a pair of doctors, who later announced plans to convert it into a health spa. They added an indoor swimming pool and other facilities including saunas and steam rooms but the spa project was unsuccessful. The building was offered for sale by auction in June 2011, but failed to sell.

== Congregation history ==
City Presbyterian Church, founded by Doug Serven and Bobby Griffith, started with a group of about 20 people who began meeting in a private home in Norman, Oklahoma in the summer of 2011, with the goal of planting a PCA church in downtown Oklahoma City. That fall and winter they held a few worship services, started small group meetings throughout the city, and held social events and service projects in an effort to reach out to the Oklahoma City community. City Presbyterian held its first worship service on January 15, 2012. From January 2012 through March 2014 it met in space which was rented or borrowed from various churches in downtown Oklahoma City. On September 8, 2013, City Presbyterian Church announced that it had entered into an agreement to purchase the building formerly belonging to Pilgrim Congregational Church. The purchase was completed on November 1, 2013, and after completing renovations the church held a "grand opening" of the building on Easter Sunday, April 20, 2014. The church has continued to update and modernize the building including filling in the indoor pool in 2019, and roof replacement in 2021. On Pentecost Sunday, June 8, 2014, City Presbyterian Church officially transitioned from a mission church to a self-governing congregation within the Presbyterian Church in America.

== See also ==
- National Register of Historic Places listings in Oklahoma County, Oklahoma
