= Hales Mansion =

- W. T. Hales House
- U.S. National Register of Historic Places
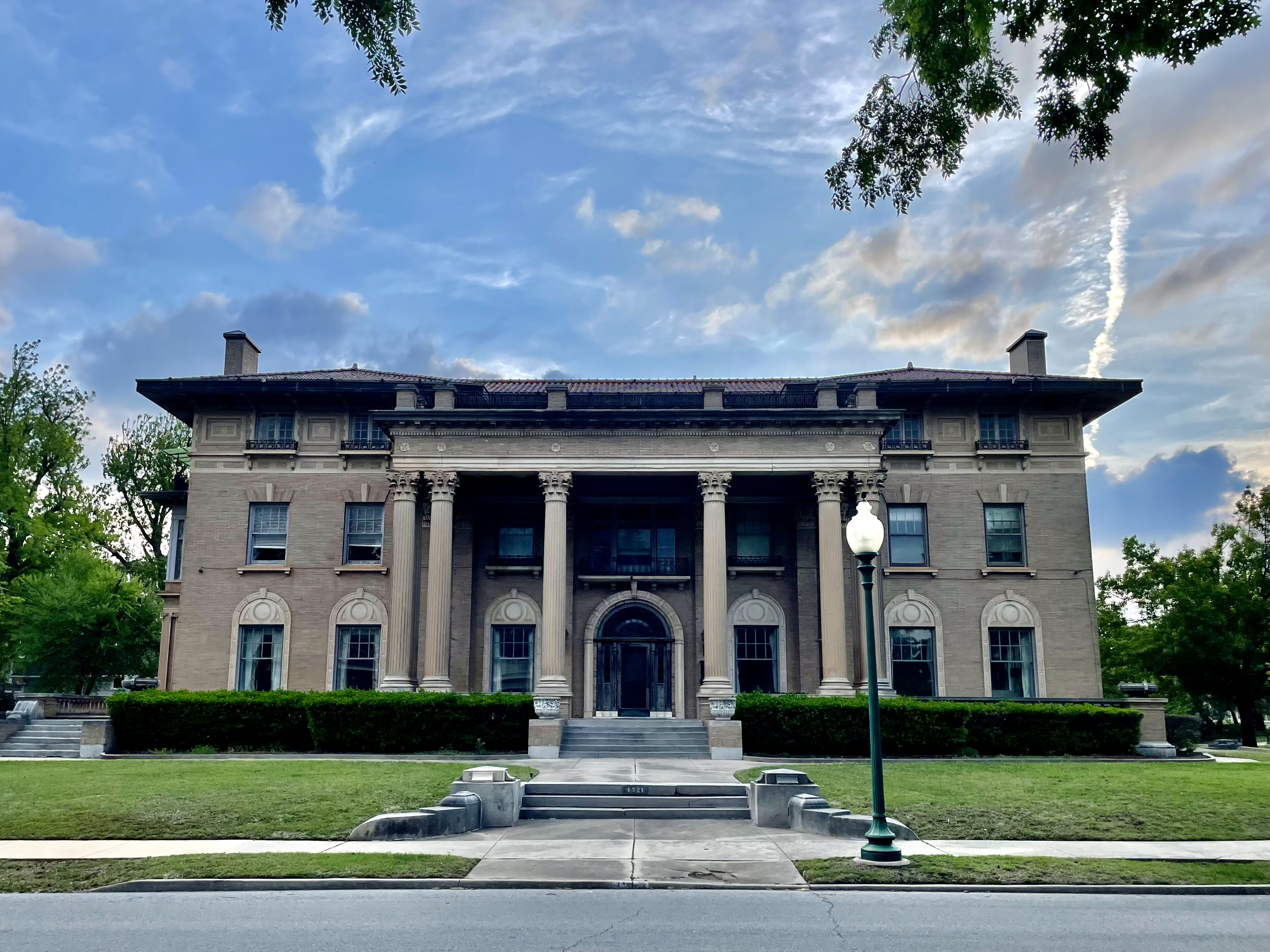

- Location within Oklahoma Location within the United States
- Location: 1521 N. Hudson Ave., Oklahoma City, Oklahoma
- Coordinates: 35°29′9″N 97°31′9″W
- Area: 1.17 acres (0.47 ha)
- Built: 1916
- Architect: Hawk & Parr
- Architectural style: Renaissance, Italian Renaissance Revival
- NRHP reference No.: 78002245
- Added to NRHP: March 29, 1978

The Hales Mansion is a mansion built in 1916 in the Heritage Hills neighborhood of Oklahoma City, Oklahoma, United States.

== History ==
The Second Renaissance Revival house was built for William Taylor Hales, a prominent business man of early Oklahoma City, in 1916 at a cost of 125,000 USD. In 1939, the mansion was bought by the Roman Catholic Archdiocese of Oklahoma City and served as the residence of the archbishop until it was converted back into a private residence in 1992. The mansion was added to the National Register of Historic Places in 1978. In April 2017, the mansion was bought by an Oklahoma City radiologist for $2.125 million.

== Architecture ==
The house contains 20,021 square feet of living space spread over three floors, and an additional 3,136 square feet of basement, making the Hales Mansion the largest residence in Oklahoma City. The mansion was designed by the firm Hawk & Parr and is constructed of Bedford limestone and bricks imported from Greece. The main entrance on the east facade is a large, two-story portico supported by eight Corinthian columns. The secondary entrance on the north facade, facing the Overholser Mansion, is also a two-story portico but supported by four columns. On the ground level, the main entrance opens into a grand hall and a grand staircase.
