= Anna Ione Murphy Overholser =

American socialite

- Born: Anna Ione Murphy; October 12, 1870; Holden, Missouri, U.S.
- Died: April 29, 1940 (aged 69); Oklahoma City, Oklahoma, U.S.
- Resting place: Fairlawn Cemetery, Oklahoma City
- Spouse: Henry Overholser
- Father: Samuel Murphy

Anna Ione Murphy Overholser (October 12, 1870 – April 29, 1940) was an American socialite who was active in Oklahoma City from 1889 until her death in 1940.

== Biography ==
Anna Ione Murphy was born on October 12, 1870, in Holden, Missouri to Delilah Floyd and Samuel Murphy, the first treasurer of Oklahoma Territory. The Murphy family moved to Oklahoma City on June 3, 1889, after finishing high school in Arkansas. On October 23, 1889 she married Henry Overholser. Anna was active in many women's clubs including the Philomathea, Modern Classics, Ladies' Chautauqua Circle, Ladies' Music and Art League, Duplicate Whist Club, Republican Women's Club, and Five O'Clock Tea Club. She founded the Chafing Dish Club, a social club, in 1899 and the First Families of Oklahoma, a charity, in 1908. She served as president of both organizations after their founding. She died on April 29, 1940, and was buried in Oklahoma City.

=== Overholser Mansion ===
In 1903, Anna and Henry built the Overholser Mansion, which they would both stay in until their deaths. In 1972 the Overholser's son-in-law David Jay Perry sold the mansion to the Oklahoma Historical Society. According to The Oklahoman local ghost stories in Oklahoma City claim her ghost haunts the mansion.
