= Mid-Continent Life Building =

Historic building in Oklahoma City, US

Coordinates: 35.48333°N 97.52601°W

The Mid-Continent Life Building is a historic building at 1400 Classen Drive in Heritage Hills, Oklahoma City, Oklahoma. It was built by Col. R.T. Stuart, who was the founder of the Mid-Continent Life Insurance Co to house his company and was designed by Solomon Layton and opened in 1927. It was listed on the National Register of Historic Places in 1979. The building was purchased in 2001 by the Oklahoma Heritage Association using a donation of $3 million by Edward Gaylord. The building is now home to the Gaylord-Pickens Oklahoma Heritage Museum, home of the Oklahoma Hall of Fame. The building's design is Neoclassical.
