= Overholser Mansion =

Historic house in Oklahoma, United States

- Henry Overholser Mansion
- U.S. National Register of Historic Places
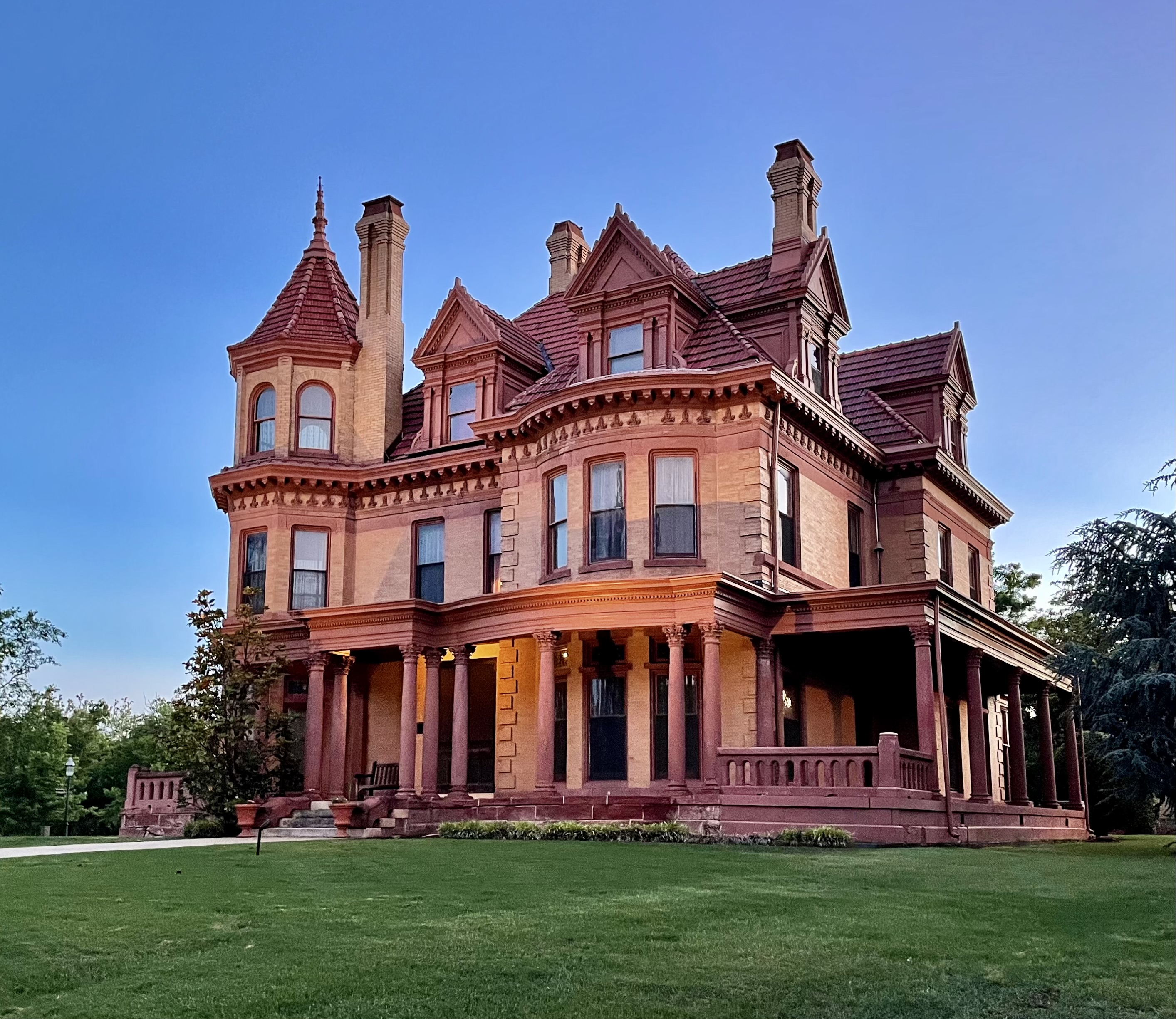

- Location within Oklahoma Location within the United States
- Location: 405 NW 15th St., Oklahoma City, Oklahoma
- Coordinates: 35°29′7″N 97°31′10″W
- Area: 1.1 acres (0.45 ha)
- Built: 1903
- Architect: W. S. Matthews
- Architectural style: Châteauesque
- NRHP reference No.: 70000536
- Added to NRHP: 1970

The Overholser Mansion is a historic house museum in Oklahoma City's Heritage Hills neighborhood, built in 1903.

== History ==
The mansion was built by Henry Overholser, considered to be the "father of Oklahoma City" by many, and his socialite wife Anna Ione Murphy Overholser, and is considered to be Oklahoma City's first mansion. Overholser bought the land for the purpose of building a residence in 1901 and, when built, the mansion was located away from the city center and surrounded by farmland. Mr. Overholser died in 1915. The couple's daughter, Henry Ione Overholser (born in 1905), married David Perry in 1926 and lived in the mansion with Mrs. Overholser until her death in 1940. Mrs. Overholser transferred ownership to Henry lone in 1937. After Henry Ione's death in 1959, the property was transferred to her husband David Perry, who then sold the mansion and its furnishings to the Oklahoma Chapter of American Institute of Architects and Historical Preservation Inc. The mansion was listed on the National Register of Historic Places in 1970. The mansion was later donated to the State of Oklahoma, where it became a museum. The Oklahoma Historical Society managed the property from 1982 to 2003, and from 2003 to the present the site has been managed by Preservation Oklahoma. The Overholser Mansion was restored in 2015 and is open for tours.

According to The Oklahoman, local ghost stories in Oklahoma City claim Anna Ione Murphy Overholser's ghost haunts the mansion.

== Architecture ==
The 11,700 square-foot Châteauesque-styled mansion was designed by London-trained architect W. S. Matthews and built at a cost of $38,000. On the south facade, facing the Hales Mansion, is a porte-cochère. At the southeast corner is a three-story octagonal tower capped with an 8-sided pyramidal roof with a finial. The mansion is clad in buff-colored brick and red sandstone. Interior walls and ceilings were hand-painted and are illuminated by light fixtures imported from Italy. Original French stained-glass windows remain, and the floors are original English carpets and are accented by Belgian woodwork.

A carriage house accompanies the mansion to the west and measures an additional 4,000 square feet (370 m^{2}). Built at the same time as the mansion, the carriage house is also clad in the same buff-colored brick. It has a square footprint and a pyramid roof with prominent wall dormers on all four sides. A cupola with a bell roof caps the apex of the pyramid roof.

== Layout ==
=== Mansion ===
==== Basement ====
Access to the basement is located under the back staircase, near the kitchen.

==== First floor ====
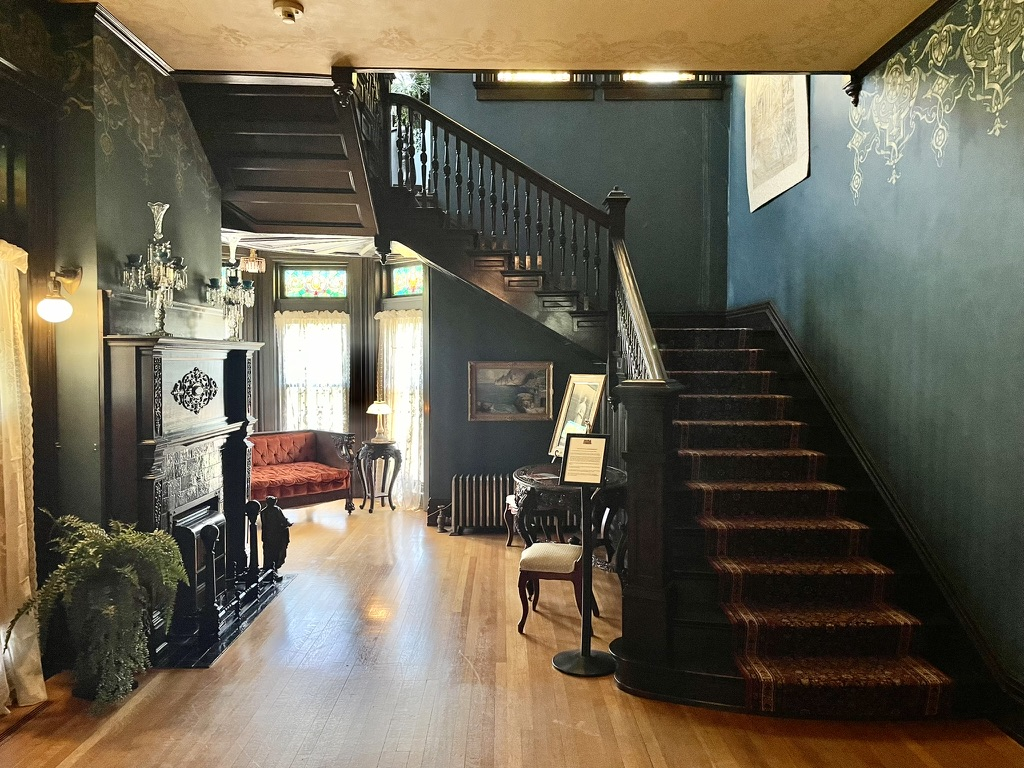
Main staircase

Two prominent entrances that face and N Hudson Avenue (east entrance) and NW 15th Street (south entrance) are located on the first floor. Connecting these two entrances is an L-shaped hallway. The main staircase is located at the east entrance, leading up to the second floor. Across the hall to the north is the drawing room. Connected to the west through a colonnade is the music room. Across the hall to the south of the music room is the library. At the confluence of the L-shaped hallway is the back staircase, leading up to the second and third floors. To the east of the library, across the hallway, is the dining room. Located to the north of the dining room is the butler's pantry, leading into the kitchen. The rear entrance leads out to the north from the kitchen. The kitchen connects to the main halls through another doorway to the east, leading to the underside of the back stairs, where the entrance to the basement is located.

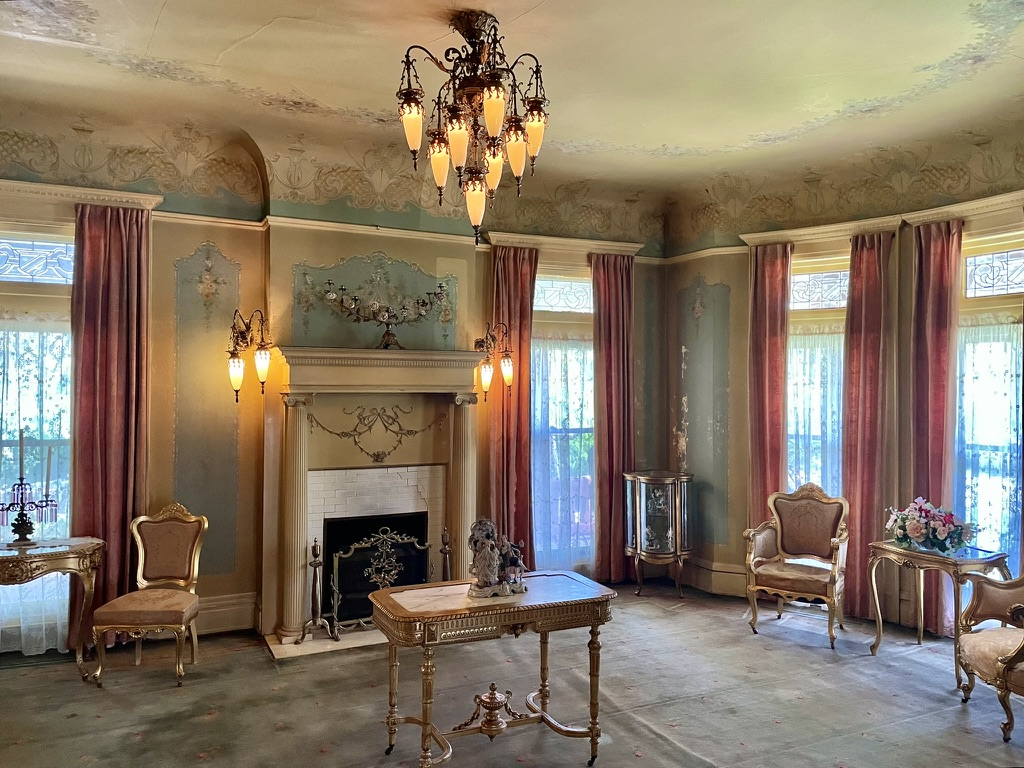
Drawing room

==== Second floor ====
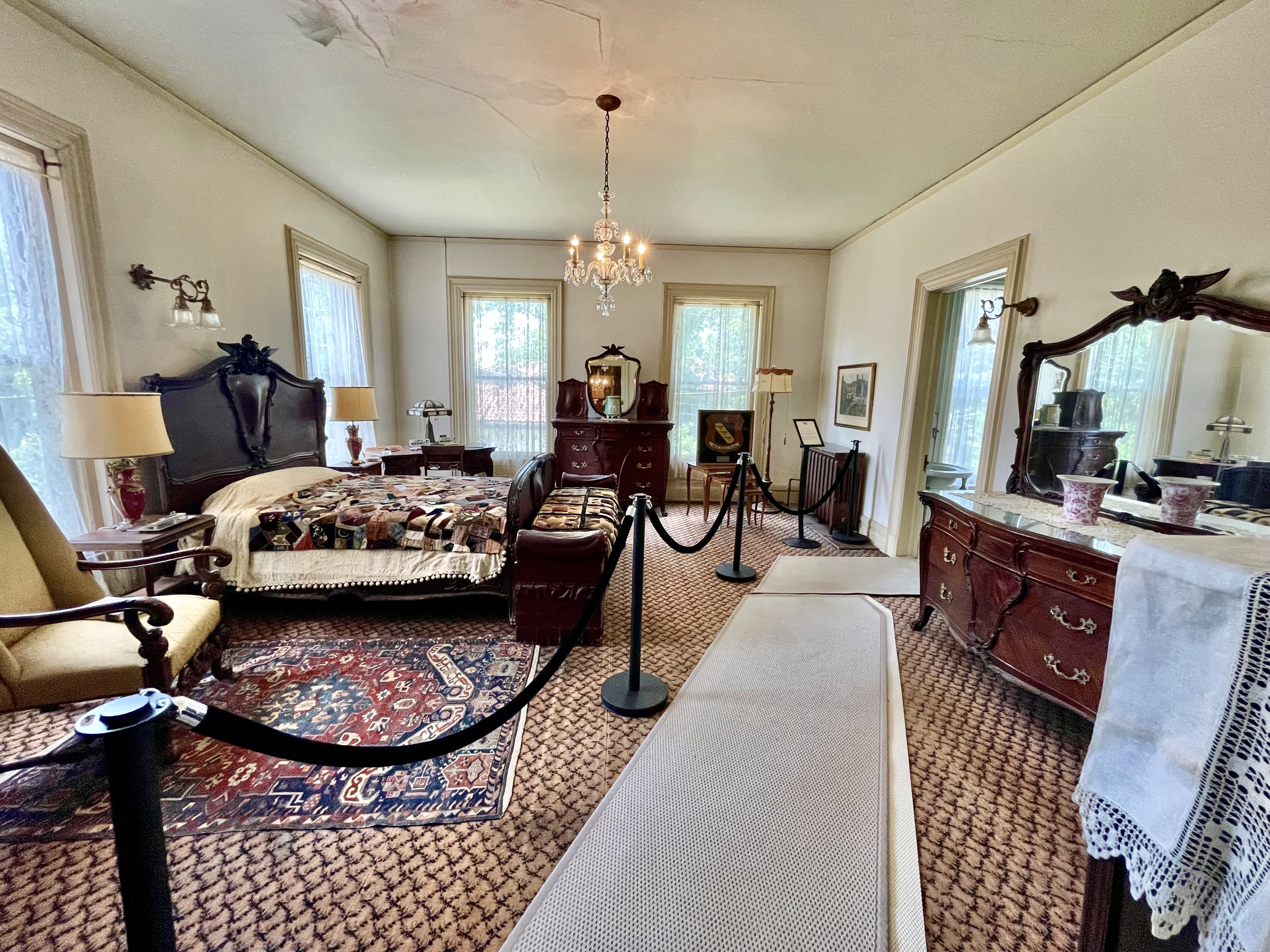
Overholser Bedroom

The second floor is accessible from two staircases. The main staircase leads up to two landings and a large hall. The second and larger stair landing has a small sitting area that occupies part of the tower. Also at the top of the staircase are two large stained-glass windows, each depicting Greek women playing an instrument, one a violin and the other a tambourine. To the north is the Monroney Bedroom. Connected to the Monroney Bedroom to the west is a bathroom, which then leads into the Overholser Bedroom. Across the hall from the main bedroom is the Perry Bedroom. This bedroom was updated and redecorated in the 1950s. Connected to the Perry Bedroom is another bathroom to the west, which then leads into the second floor sitting room. The sitting room is also accessible from a small hallway where the back stairs are located. To the north of the sitting room is a small sewing room that leads into the nursery. The nursery also connects to the small back hallway.

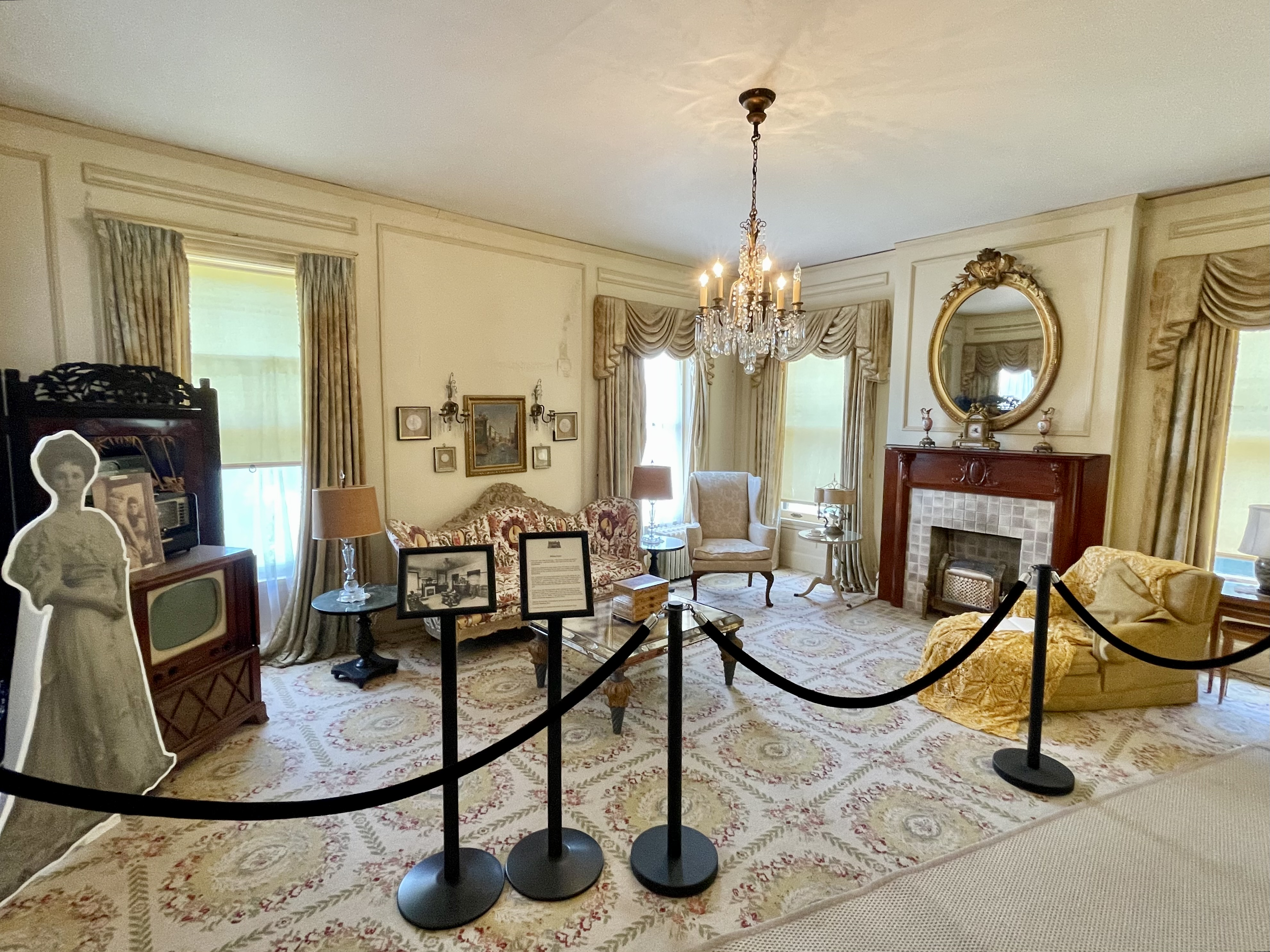
Second floor sitting room

==== Third floor ====
The third floor is only accessible from the back staircase. The stairs lead into a ballroom and nooks under three dormers. To the east is another room with access to another dormer nook and a hallway to a room in the tower. This room contains display cases containing antique furniture and items. To the northeast of the ballroom is a spacious maid's room with a bathroom and three more dormer nooks. Located throughout the third floor along the exterior walls are numerous closets and storage rooms.

=== Carriage house ===
Located to the west of the mansion and constructed at the same time is a two-story carriage house. The first floor originally housed stables, while the second floor was the hayloft. The first floor later became a garage and the second floor became servants' quarters. The carriage house now houses offices and event space.

== Gallery ==
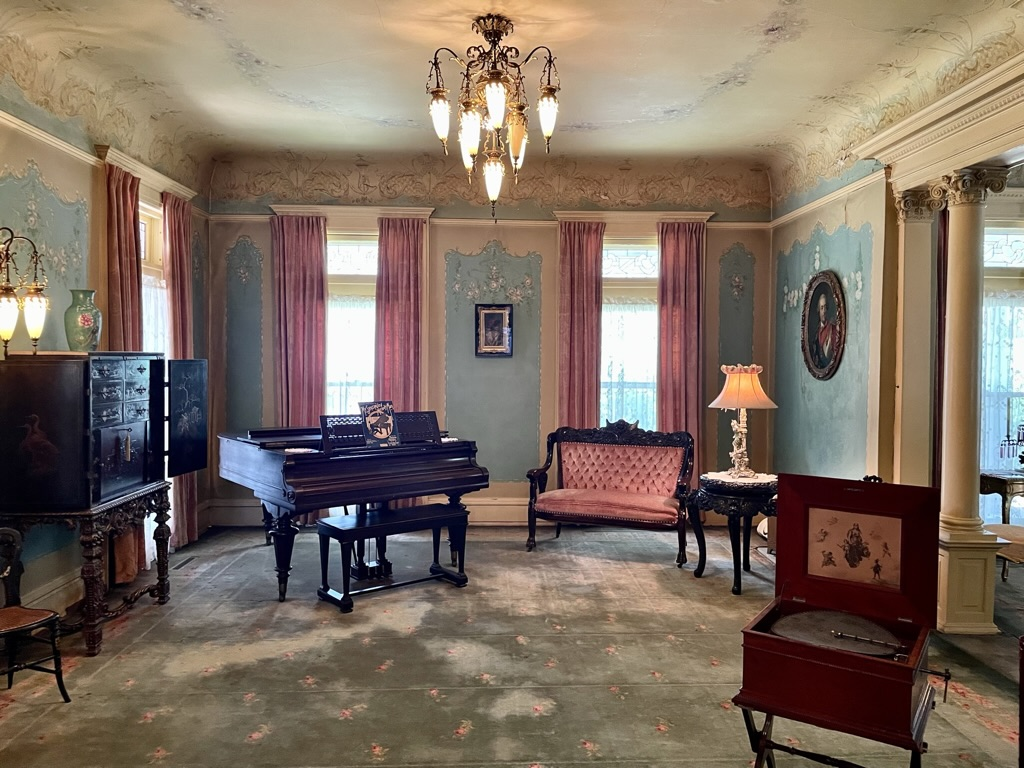
Music room

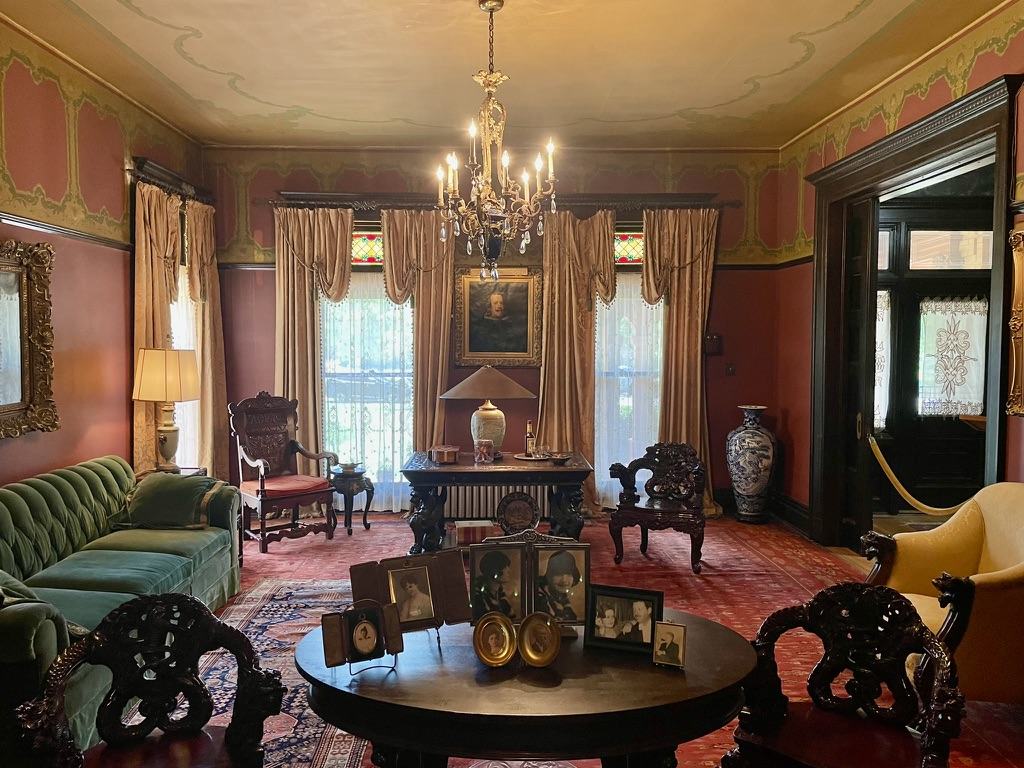
Library

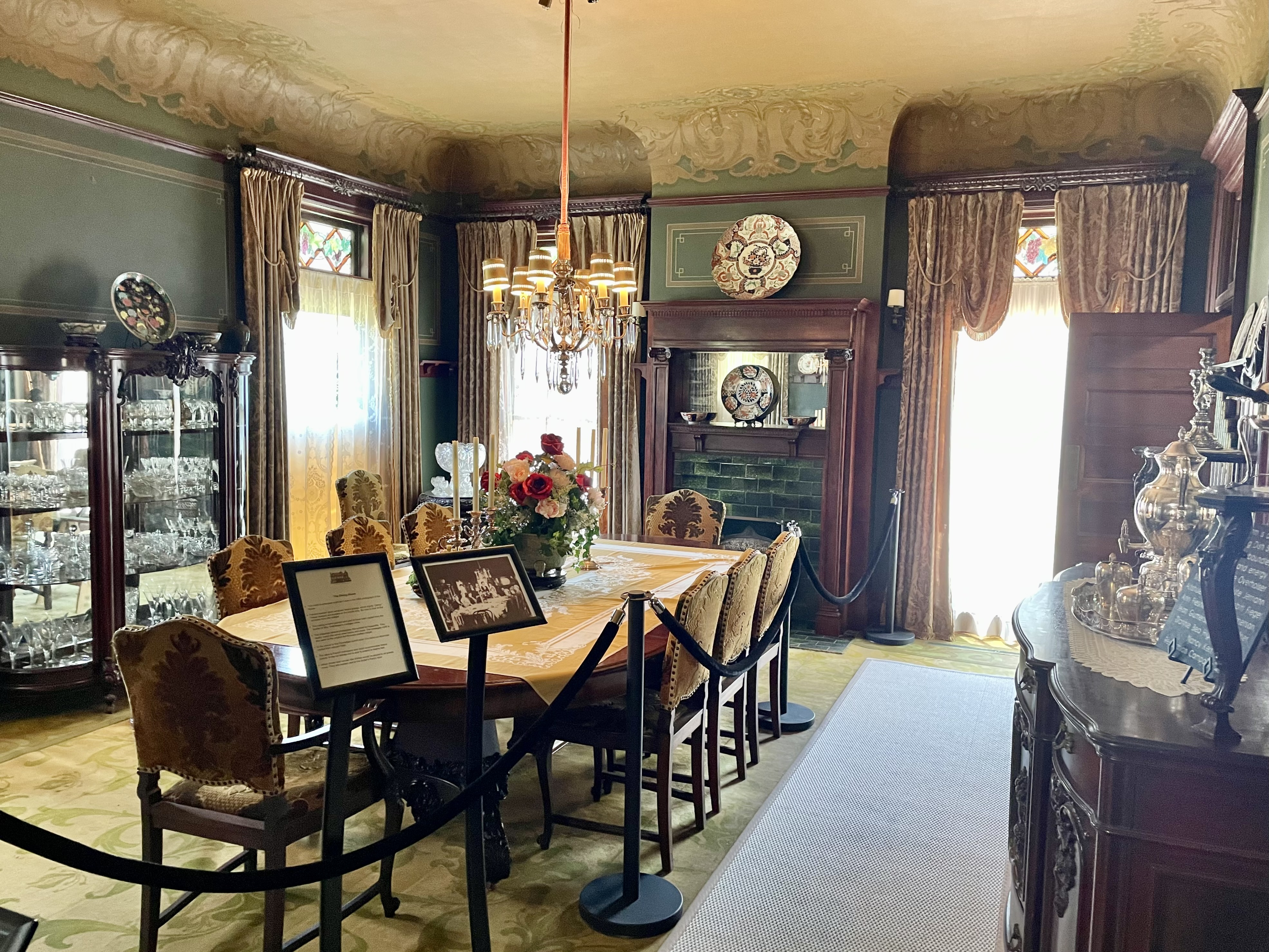
Dining room

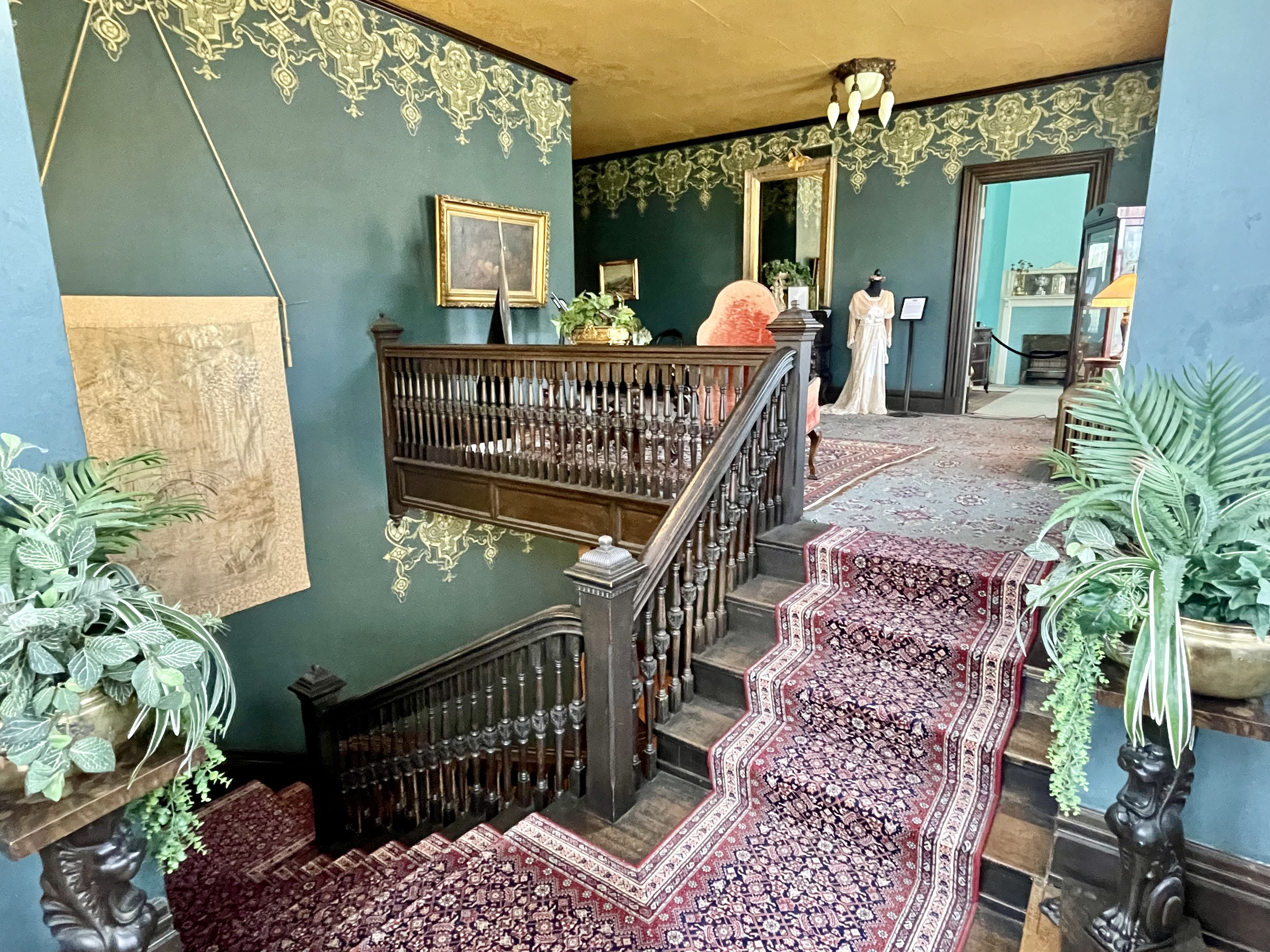
Main staircase landing

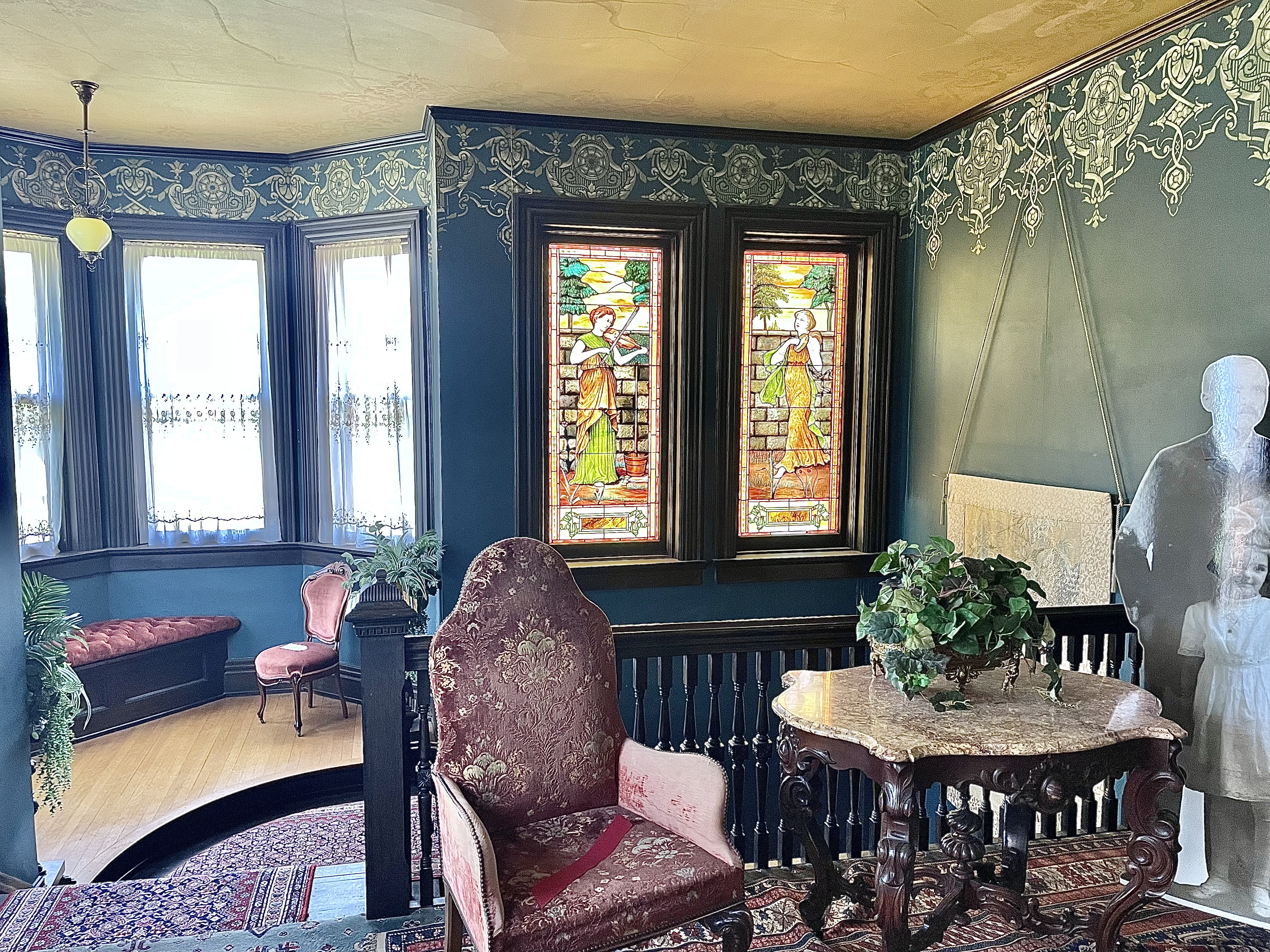
Main staircase landing and stained glass

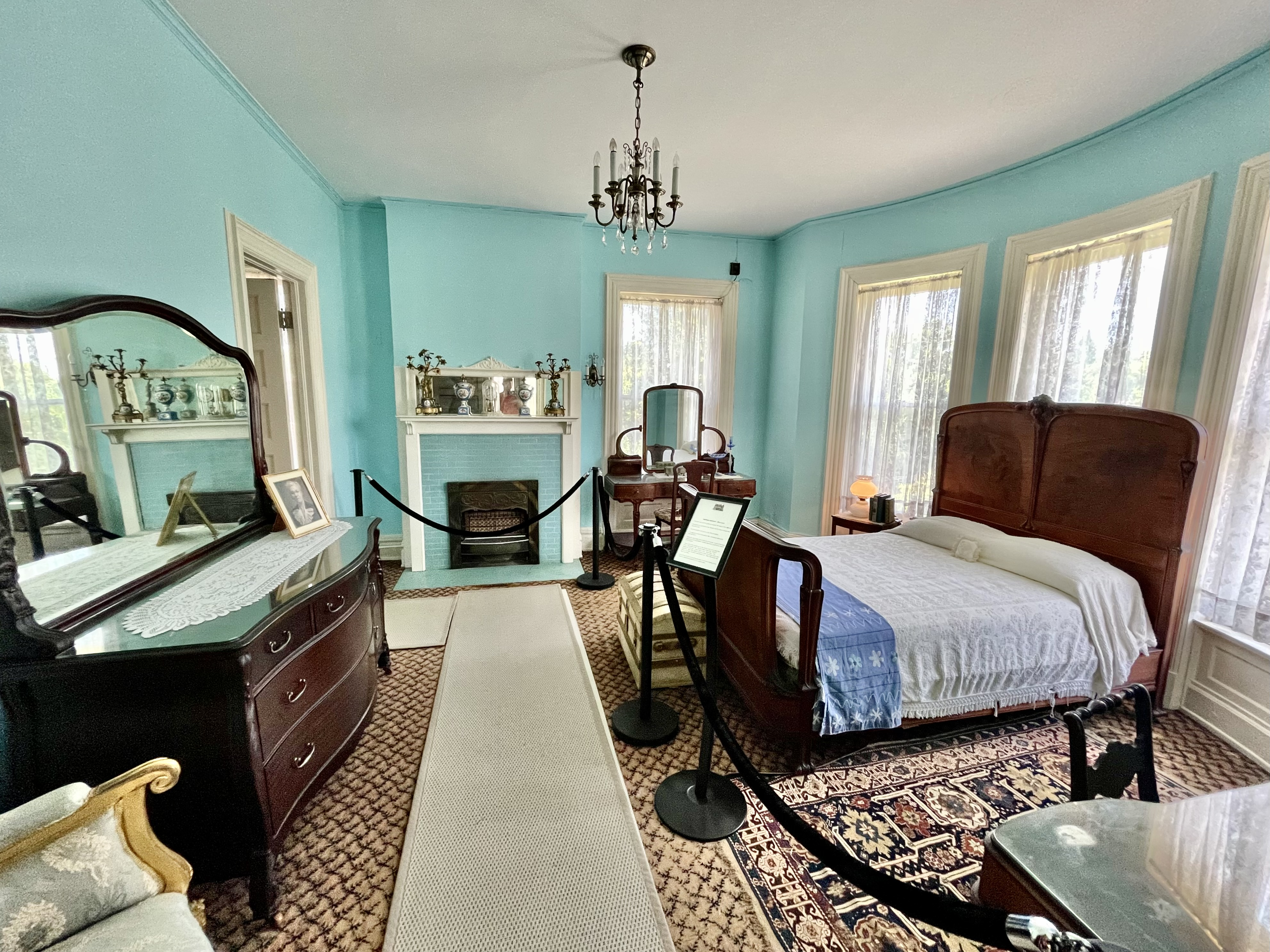
Monroney Bedroom

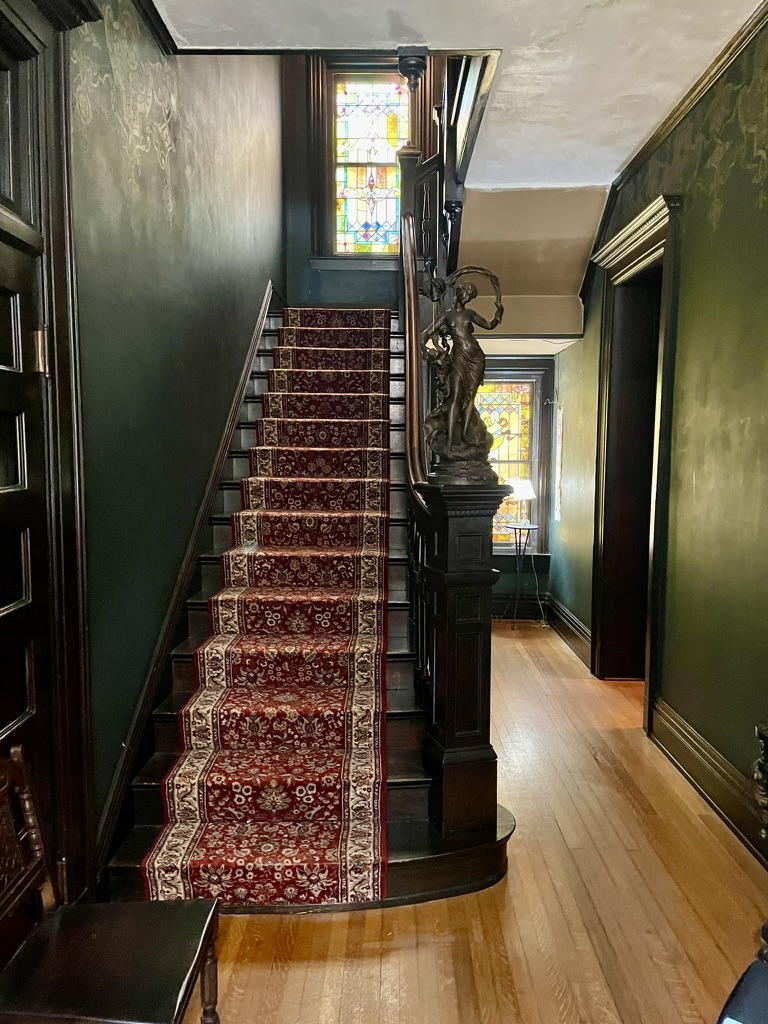
Back staircase

== See also ==
- National Register of Historic Places listings in Oklahoma County, Oklahoma
