= Scottish Rite Temple (Guthrie, Oklahoma) =

- U.S. National Register of Historic Places
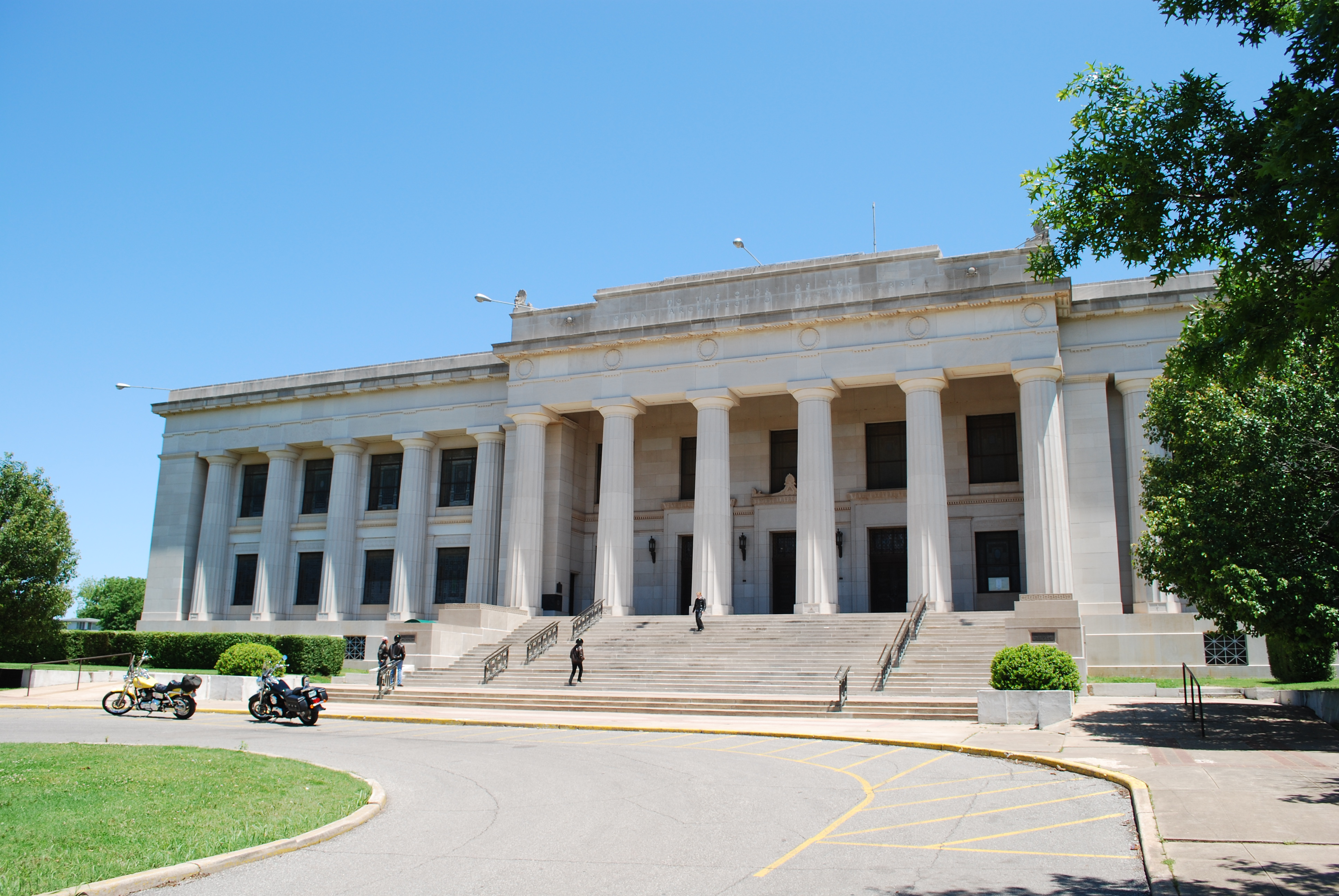

- Location within Oklahoma Location within the United States
- Location: 900 E. Oklahoma, Guthrie, Oklahoma
- Coordinates: 35°52′41″N 97°24′48″W
- Area: 10.6 acres (4.3 ha)
- Built: 1919
- Architect: Parr & Hawk
- Architectural style: Classical Revival
- NRHP reference No.: 87000503
- Added to NRHP: April 9, 1987

The Scottish Rite Temple in Guthrie, Oklahoma, is a Masonic temple that serves as the home of the Scottish Rite in the Guthrie Valley, Oklahoma Orient, Ancient and Accepted Scottish Rite of Freemasonry, Southern Jurisdiction, U.S.A. This is actually a complex consisting of two buildings on a 10 acres (40,000 m^{2}) plot of ground on Oklahoma Avenue in downtown Guthrie that was originally named Capitol Park.

== NRHP Assessment ==
The Scottish Rite Temple of Guthrie is architecturally and historically significant because it is one of the best examples of large scale, Neo-Classical Revival style in Oklahoma; it is the largest, most elaborately designed and constructed Masonic Temple in the state; and because of its importance historically to the Masonic fraternal organization in Oklahoma.

Also "it has been recognized as the center of state-level Masonic activities since 1923, when first used even before completion. It is ... the site of the Mason's statewide functions. ... "

== Description ==
=== Original building and park ===
The original building in this complex, now named the East Annex, was constructed in 1908 by the city of Guthrie and called Convention Hall. It was intended as the meeting place for the Oklahoma State Legislature. It was a rectangular brick structure with two two-story wings flanking a two-story atrium having a gallery promenade. A basement completed the internal space.

The East Annex was used for one regular session of the Legislature in 1909 and one special session in 1910. After the Legislature agreed to move the state capital from Guthrie to Oklahoma City in 1910, the city of Guthrie offered to sell the Convention Hall complex, including Capitol Park, to the Scottish Rite Masons, who wanted to construct a temple in Guthrie. A deal was concluded with the Parr & Hawk, an Oklahoma City architectural firm, to design the western building (designated as the Temple), and the James Stewart Construction Company began construction in May 1920.

It is "one of the world's largest Masonic Centers".

The building was designed by architects and built in 1919 in Classical Revival style. It was listed on the U.S. National Register of Historic Places in 1987.

From the NRHP nom:

It is located at 900 E. Oklahoma in Guthrie.

There is a museum, the Guthrie Scottish Rite Museum, there.
