= Ed Overholser =

American mayor (1869–1931)

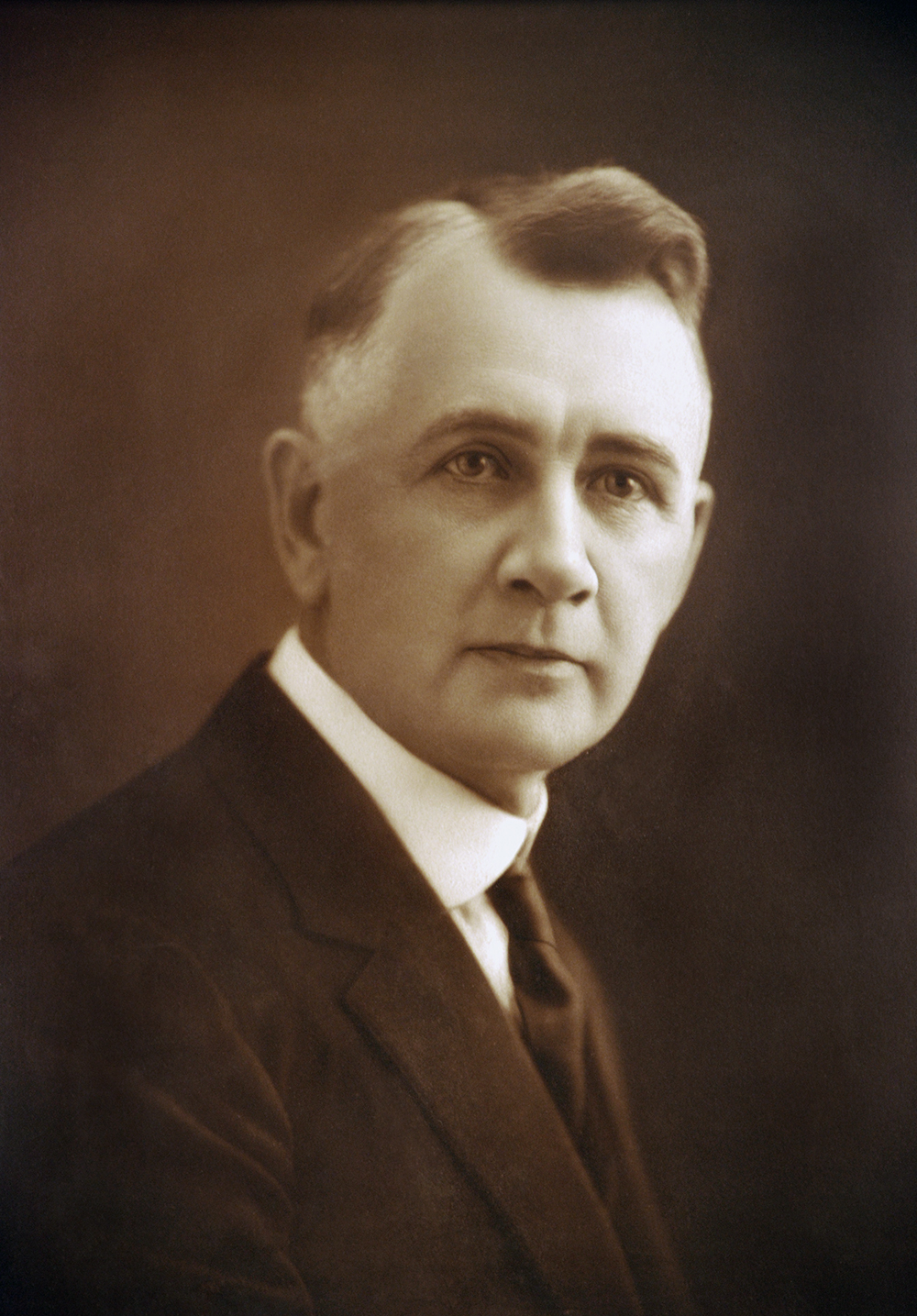

17th Mayor of Oklahoma City
- In office April 13, 1915 – December 24, 1918
- Preceded by: Whit M. Grant
- Succeeded by: Byron D. Shear

Personal details
- Born: June 20, 1869 Sullivan, Indiana
- Died: April 21, 1931 (aged 61) Oklahoma City, Oklahoma
- Party: Republican

Ed Overholser (June 20, 1869 – April 21, 1931) was an American politician who was the 16th mayor of Oklahoma City and a president of Oklahoma City Chamber of Commerce.

== Early life and career ==
Overholser was born in Sullivan, Indiana, to Henry Overholser and Emma Hanna Overholser. He was educated in public schools and attended a preparatory school for boys in Kansas. He arrived in Oklahoma City on April 2, 1890, and took over the management of the Overholser Opera House.

In the late 1890s, Overholser helped organized the townsites of Stroud, Wellston, Luther and Jones. He entered public service and worked as the manager of the Oklahoma City waterworks department and was the first Secretary of the State Fair Association. He also served as a school board member and as Chairman of the Board of County Commissioners. He was responsible for the large lake that was named in his honor, Lake Overholser. Overholser married Allie Garrison on May 26, 1903, and had two children, one of whom survived.

== Mayor ==
Overholser won the race for mayor despite being a Republican in a strongly Democratic city. He served from April 13, 1915, to December 24, 1918.

== Later life ==
Overholser became the President of the Oklahoma City Chamber of Commerce from 1922 to 1927. He was responsible for erasing the chamber's debt and increasing the membership to 5,000, an impressive feat at a time when only five cities in the U.S. claimed large memberships. He was a member of a Masonic lodge, the Lutheran Church, and numerous clubs. Illness took his life on April 21, 1931, in Oklahoma City.
