= Winfield Public Carnegie Library =

- U.S. National Register of Historic Places
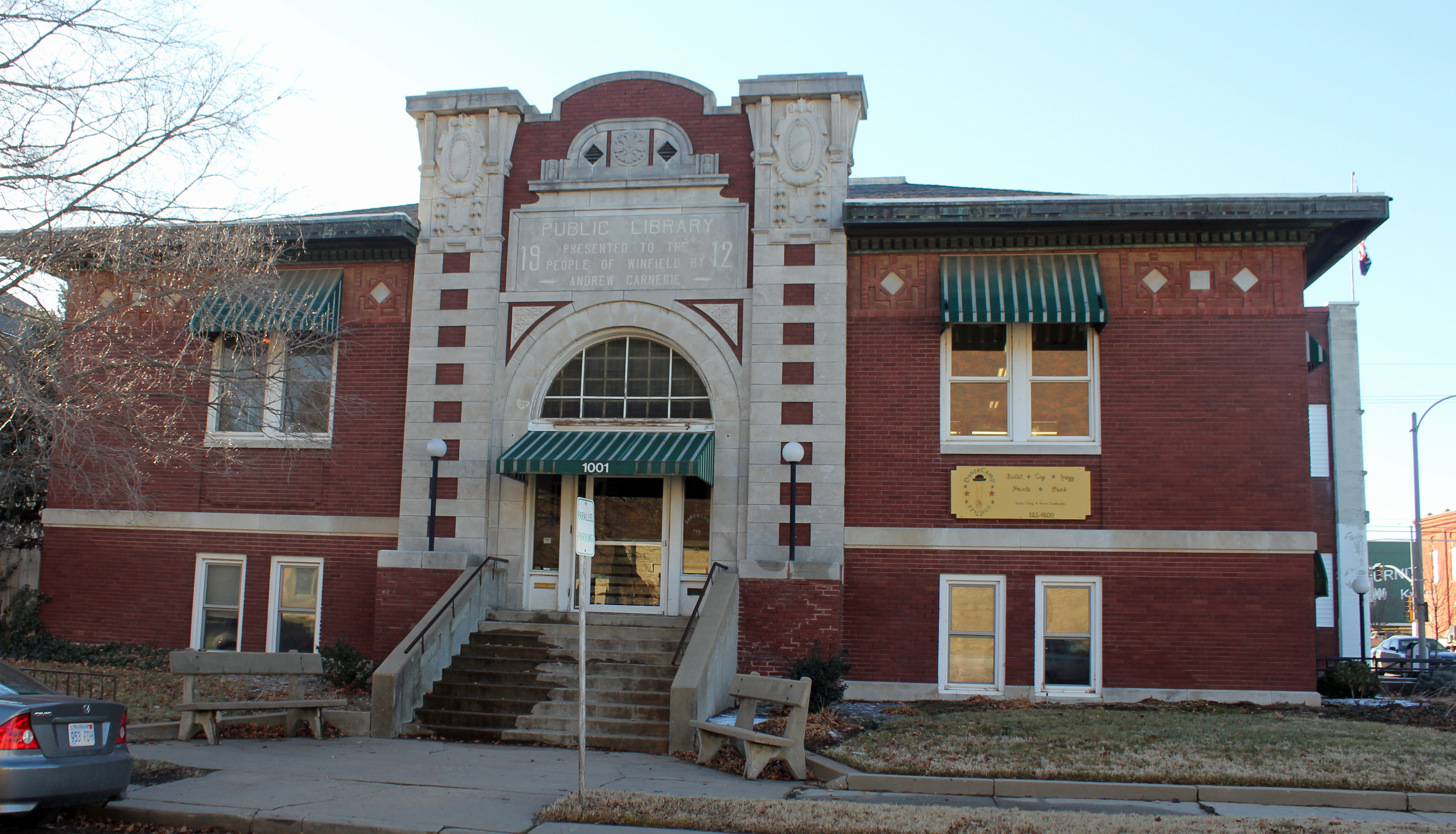
- The Winfield Public Carnegie Library in 2013

- Location within Kansas Location within the United States
- Location: 1001 Millington St., Winfield, Kansas
- Coordinates: 37°14′19″N 96°59′47″W
- Area: Less than one acre
- Built: c. 1912
- Architects: Smith, E.C.; Parr, J.D.
- Architectural style: Eclectic 20th C. Commercial
- MPS: Carnegie Libraries of Kansas TR
- NRHP reference No.: 87002230
- Added to NRHP: January 11, 1988

The Winfield Public Carnegie Library, located at 1001 Millington Street in Winfield, Kansas, is a Carnegie library which was built in c. 1912. It was listed on the National Register of Historic Places in 1988.

Its design is credited to Smith and Parr, architects of Oklahoma City.
