= Samuel Murphy =

American politician, died 1920

Treasurer of Oklahoma Territory
- In office 1891–1894
- Governor: George Washington Steele; Abraham Jefferson Seay; William Cary Renfrow
- Preceded by: Position established

Postmaster of Oklahoma City
- In office 1898–1902
- President: William McKinley

Personal details
- Born: January 31, 1845; Kingston, Arkansas, U.S.
- Died: May 8, 1920 (aged 75)
- Political party: Republican
- Children: Anna Ione Murphy Overholser
- Education: University of Michigan

Military service
- Branch/service: Union Army
- Unit: 2nd Arkansas Cavalry Regiment
- Battles/wars: American Civil War

Samuel Murphy was an American politician who served as the first territorial treasurer of Oklahoma Territory from 1891 until 1894 and the postmaster of Oklahoma City from 1898 to 1902.

== Early life and military career ==
Samuel Murphy was born in Kingston, Arkansas on January 31, 1845, to John Murphy and Perlenta Davis. His great-grandfather had immigrated from Ireland and fought in the American Revolution; his grandfather served in the War of 1812; and his family was staunchly anti-slavery with Samuel and four of his brothers serving in the Union Army. Samuel enlisted in 1863 at age 18 and served in the 2nd Arkansas Cavalry Regiment and left the army in August of 1865.

== Education, legal, and political careers ==
He settled in Springfield, Missouri to operate a ferry before travelling to Ewing College in Illinois to continue his education. By 1870 he was an instructor at Flowermont Academy in Denton County, Texas and served as the principal their for a year before returning to Arkansas to study law in 1873. In 1874 he was admitted to the bar in Arkansas where he practiced until 1876. In 1876, he refused the Republican Party's nomination for Arkansas's 4th congressional district to focus on his legal studies. In 1877 he travelled to the University of Michigan and earned his law degree. After graduation, he returned to Arkansas and practiced until 1889. In 1880, he accepted the Republican Party's nomination for the 4th district, but lost the election to Thomas M. Gunter. In 1889, he moved to Oklahoma City and declined the nomination for a seat in the territorial legislature, but in 1891 he accepted an appointment as the first territorial treasurer for Oklahoma Territory. He held that position until 1894. In 1898 he was appointed postmaster of Oklahoma City by President William McKinley and he served in that position until 1902. In 1907, he ran for the Oklahoma Senate, but lost the election.

== Personal life ==
Murphy married Delilah Floyd and the couple had one child before her death: Anna Ione Murphy Overholser. In Michigan he remarried Louise Beverly and the couple had four children:Pearl Griffith, Paul Murphy, Clyde Murphy, and Hazel Murphy. He died on May 8, 1920.
