= Hightower Building =

- U.S. National Register of Historic Places
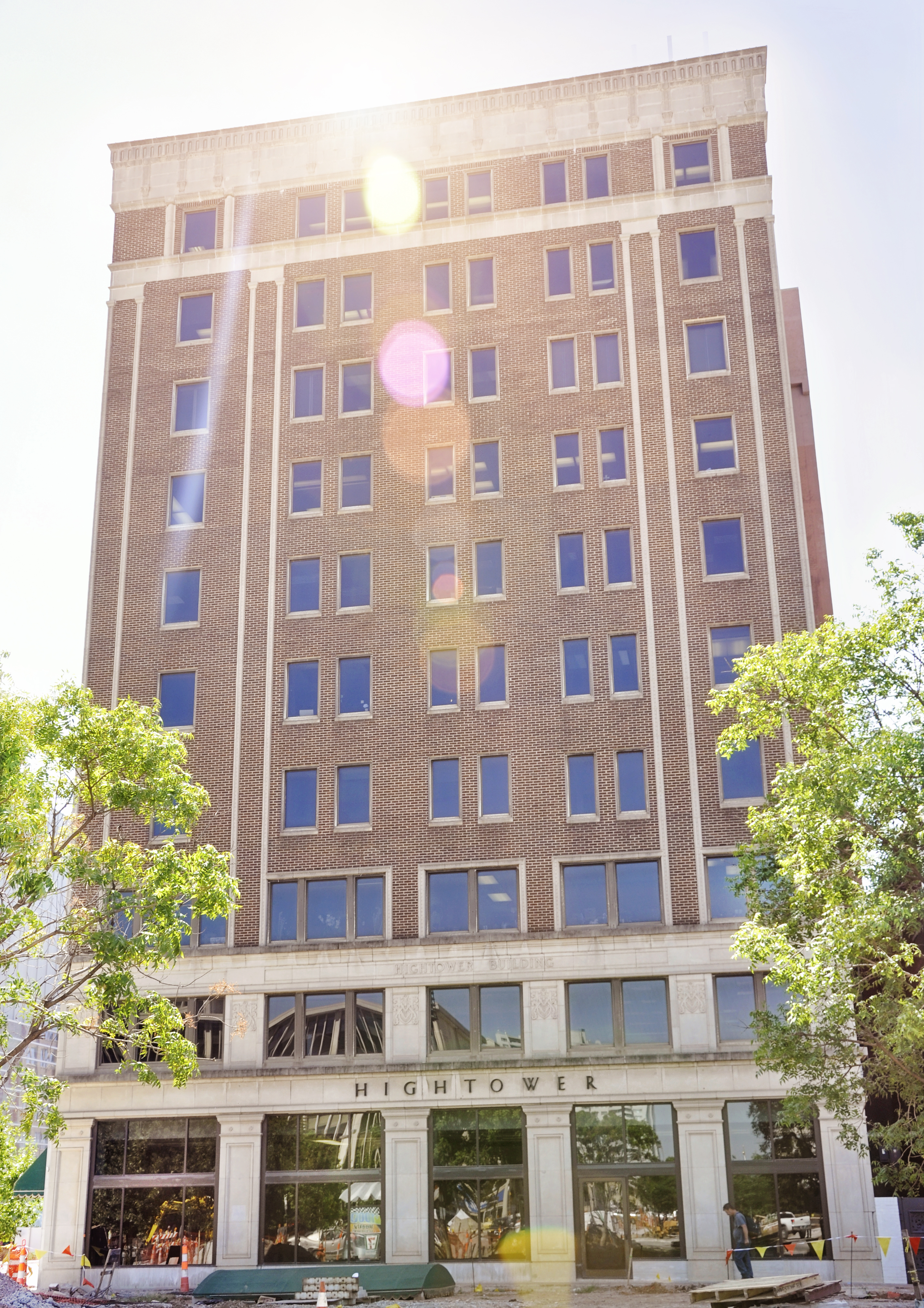

- Location within Oklahoma Location within the United States
- Location: 105 N. Hudson, Oklahoma City, Oklahoma
- Coordinates: 35°28′11″N 97°31′11″W
- Area: 1.2 acres (0.49 ha)
- Built: 1929
- Built by: Price and Kerns
- Architect: Hawk, J.W. and Parr, J.O.
- Architectural style: Classical Revival, Skyscraper
- NRHP reference No.: 02000176
- Added to NRHP: March 13, 2002

The Hightower Building is a historic commercial office building located at 105 North Hudson in Oklahoma City, Oklahoma.

== Description and history ==
Designed by J.W. Hawk and J.O. Parr, the Classical Revival style building was originally built in 1920 with three stories and four elevators, and underwent a seven-story addition, in 1929, making it the ten-story, 130 foot tall building it is today.

As described in its NRHP designation, “Although some alterations have been made to upper floor interiors and the original windows have been removed and replaced, the overall design, with smooth brickwork and classically-inspired, cast stone details, retain the original architectural design and integrity. It remains the only "skyscraper" of the 1920s era that utilizes the Classical Revival motif in Oklahoma City.”

“In 1959, the Johnson family purchased a three-story building adjacent to the west which was built in 1925. The interior and exterior of this building was remodeled to match the Hightower design and the addition blends perfectly.”

It was listed on the National Register of Historic Places on March 13, 2002.
