= Lake Overholser =

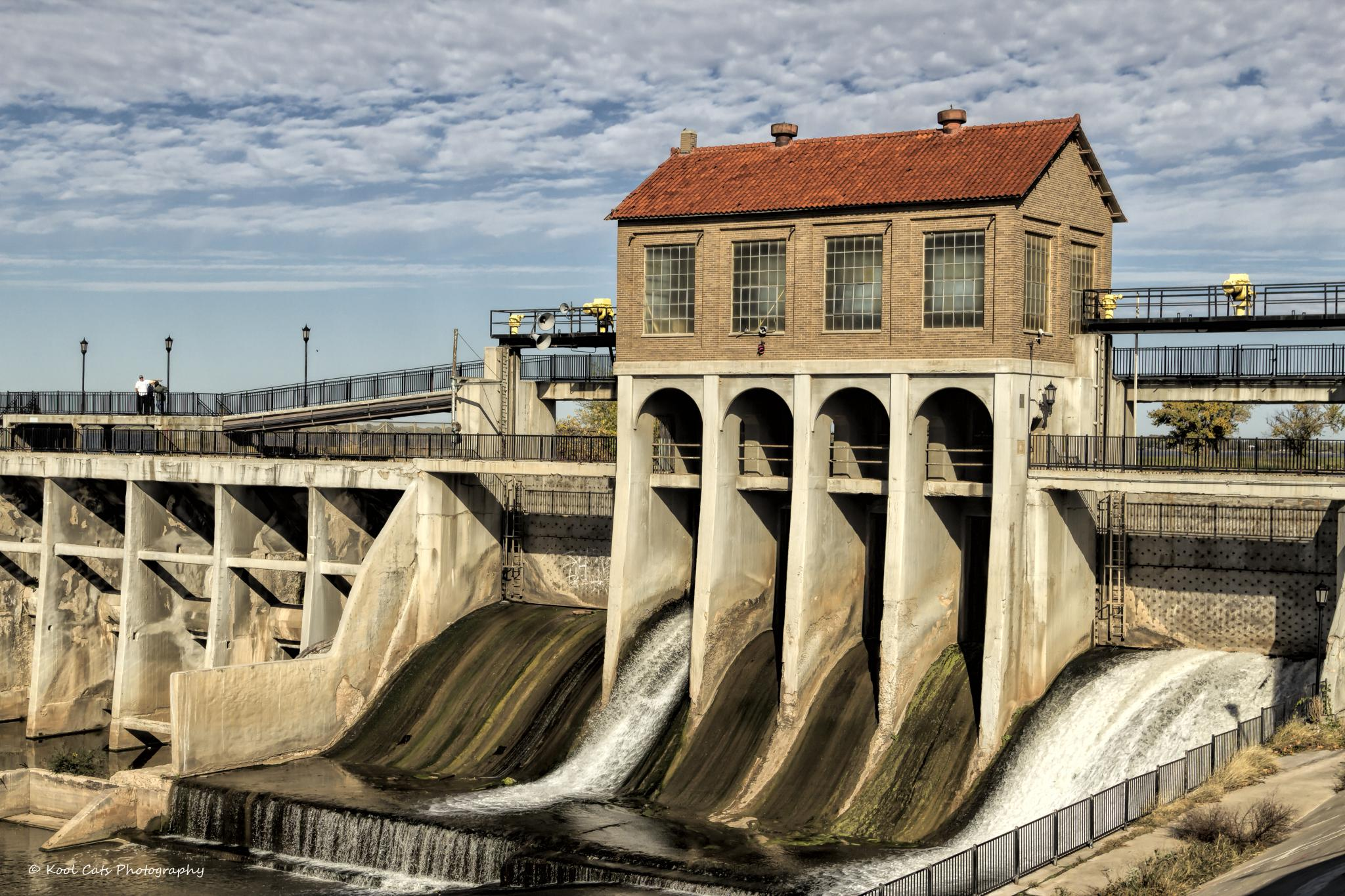
- Overholser Dam in 2013

- Location within Oklahoma Location within the United States
- Location: Oklahoma City, Oklahoma, United States
- Coordinates: 35.4977°N 97.6796°W
- Basin countries: United States
- Surface area: 1,500 acres (610 ha)
- Average depth: 6 ft (1.8 m)
- Max. depth: 13 ft (4.0 m)
- Water volume: 17,100 acre⋅ft (21.1 hm^{3})
- Shore length^{1}: 7 mi (11 km)
- Surface elevation: 1,242 ft (379 m)
- Settlements: Oklahoma City, Bethany
- ^{1} Shore length is not a well-defined measure.

Lake Overholser is a reservoir within the city limits of Oklahoma City, Oklahoma. (Note: Completed in 1919, the lake straddles the line separating Oklahoma and Canadian counties, and is the oldest reservoir in the Oklahoma City area.) Lake Overholser is formed by Overholser Dam on the North Canadian River in Oklahoma County, Oklahoma. (Note: A portion of the North Canadian River that flows through Oklahoma City was renamed the Oklahoma River in 2004.) The lake is 2.9 miles (4.7 km) west of Bethany and 4.4 mi (7.1 km) from Yukon. Lake Overholser is named after Ed Overholser who was the 16th Mayor of the City of Oklahoma City.

The lake was originally intended to assure an adequate supply of municipal water, since the city depended primarily on the North Canadian River as a source, supplemented by private wells. The need for flood control capability became obvious when the river flooded in 1923. It breached the Lake Overholser Dam and inundated much of the city.

== Description ==
=== Lake ===
The lake covers approximately 1,500 acres (6 km^{2}) and was constructed in 1919 to provide water to a treatment plant. According to USGS, its capacity is 17,100 acre-feet (21,100,000 m^{3}) The average depth is 6 feet (1.8 m) and the maximum depth is only 13 feet (4.0 m).

=== U.S. Route 66 ===
"The Mother Road" was situated along the North shore of Lake Overholser from 1926 to 1958. A 1958 Route 66 improvement project created a new alignment for the highway that relocated the roadbed about 1/4 mile North of the lake. The original 1926 section of Route 66 still exists and was renamed North Overholser Drive. This includes the picturesque Lake Overholser Bridge. The alignment runs south of the Stonebridge Lake Estates and Ramsey Lake and is considered one of the most scenic sections of the original Route 66.

=== Dam ===
Lake Overholser Dam
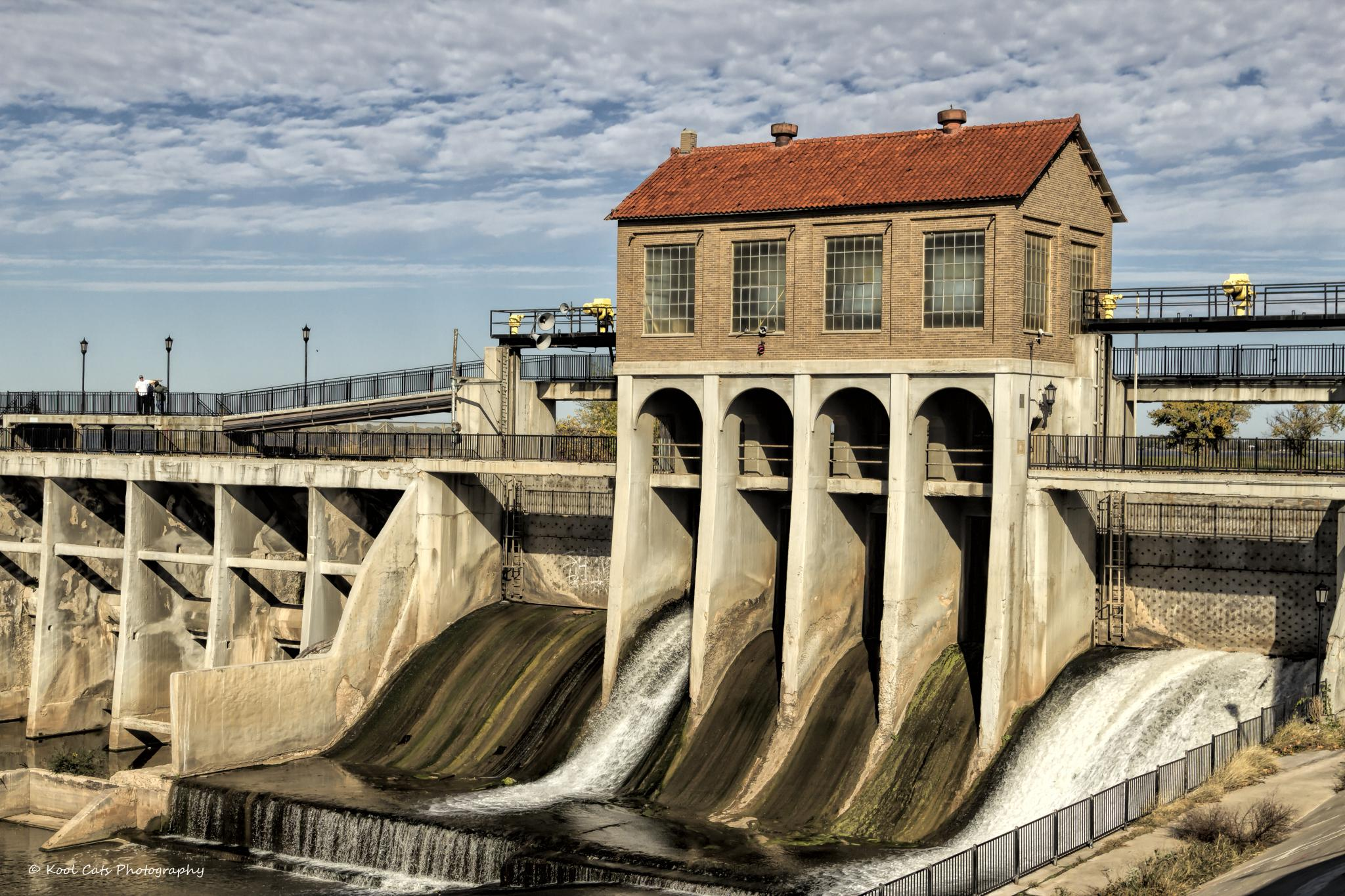
- Interactive map of Lake Overholser Dam
- Country: United States
- Location: Oklahoma City, Oklahoma
- Purpose: City water, recreation
- Status: Complete
- Construction began: 1917
- Opening date: 1918
- Owner: City of Oklahoma City

Dam and spillways
- Type of dam: Poured concrete buttress
- Impounds: North Canadian River (Oklahoma River)
- Height: 68 ft (21 m)
- Length: 1,650 ft (500 m)

The Lake Overholser Dam, designed by Niels Ambursen and built by the Ambursen Construction Company of New York, is 68 feet (21 m) high and 1,258 feet (383 m)long. Oklahoma City residents voted a $1.5 million bond issue in 1916 to pay for the project. The dam is built of reinforced poured concrete.

The dam has four distinct sections of buttressed spillways and a solid spillway. A concrete walkway extends across the dam over the buttresses until it comes to the larger spillway, where it is carried by a Pratt through truss.

A concrete wing wall anchors the dam into the eastern riverbank. The first span of the dam, between the eastern wing wall and the pump house, is wide. The brick-walled pump house has a gabled tile roof, a small chimney, and two round ventilators. It sits above four arched sluiceway openings.

== 1923 flood ==
On October 16, 1923, operators at the central telephone exchange of Oklahoma City began calling to notify subscribers living south of Grand Avenue (now Sheridan Avenue) of an impending flood caused by levee breakage at the recently built City Reservoir (now known as Lake Overholser). The daily newspaper, The Oklahoman, reported that 300 national guardsmen and American Legion volunteers had been sent to organize evacuation of a 117-block area of the city that was expected to be severely impacted by the 25-foot wall of water already heading in that direction.

Later, the paper reported that it was not the dam that had failed, but the embankment (levee) at the west end of the dam that had given way after being battered by flood waters that had built up behind the dam. Within thirty minutes, the initial rush of water had raised the downstream river level by 7 feet (2.1 m). The river held at that level for two hours, but by then the level at the east end of the dam failed, sending the downstream river level 2 feet (0.61 m) higher in a matter of minutes.

By the time the crisis had passed, Jones, Oklahoma and Spencer, Oklahoma, two towns downstream of Oklahoma City, had been surrounded by water. The official damage estimate was five people confirmed dead and property loss was $3,500,000.

== Recreational facilities ==
Lake Overholser is a popular fishing area for local residents. A covered fishing pier is on the southwest side of the lake. Species of fish include white bass, bream, bluegill, striped bass, flathead catfish, crappie, carp, catfish and largemouth bass.

Boating is allowed on the lake, but swimming is prohibited. Young students have nicknamed the lake "Lake Holdhercloser" due to the lake being a popular make out spot among teens.

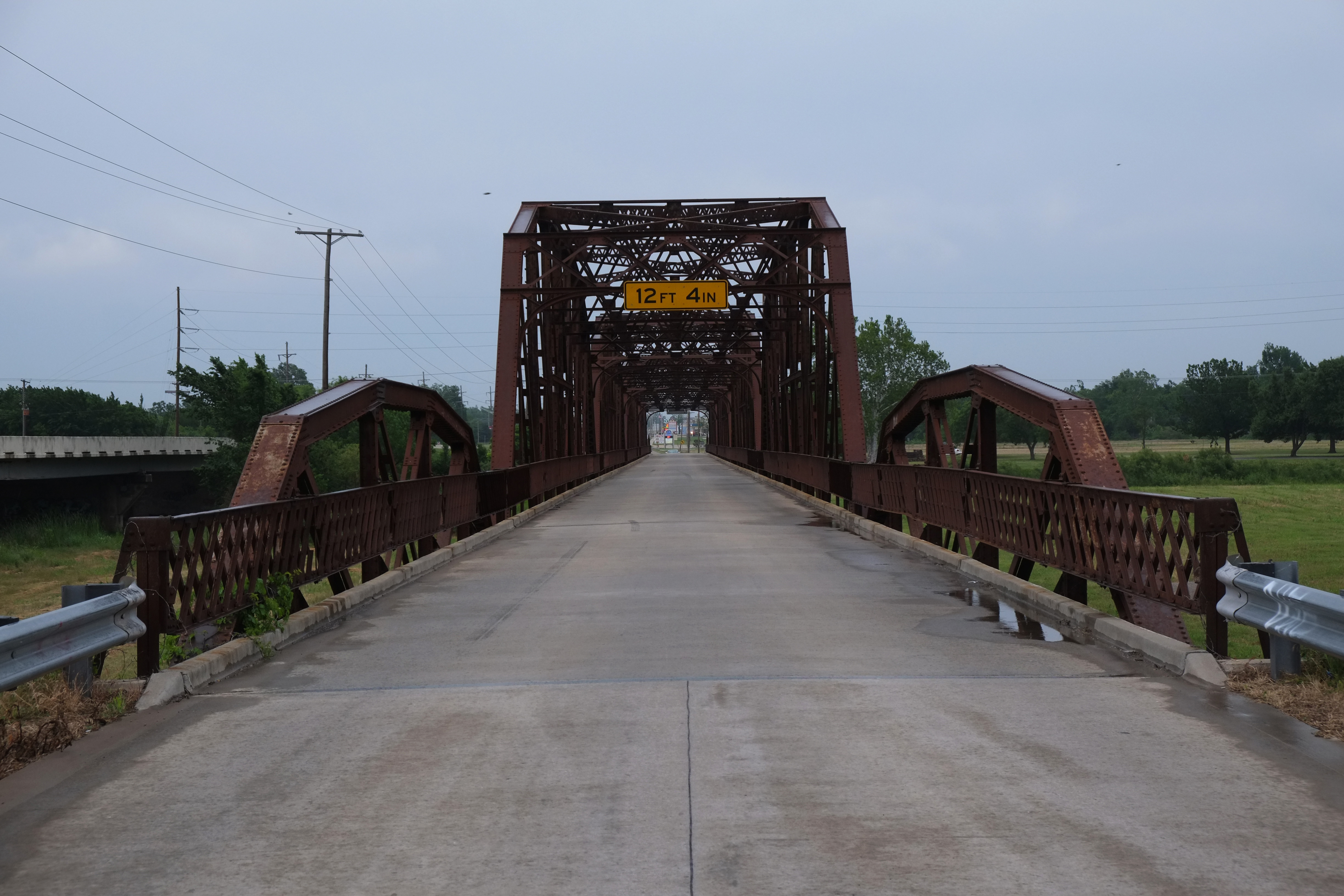
Lake Overholser bridge in Bethany, Oklahoma, 2017 courtesy Gorup de Besanez
