= Henry Overholser =

American politician

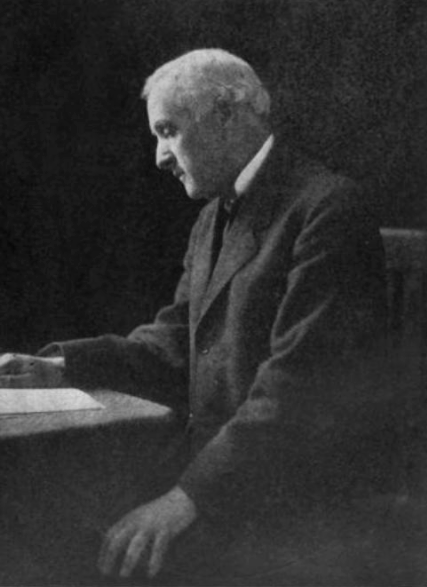
- Born: April 14, 1846; Montgomery County, Ohio
- Died: August 25, 1915 (aged 69); Oklahoma City, Oklahoma
- Resting place: Fairlawn Cemetery, Oklahoma City
- Occupation: Business
- Spouse(s): Emma Hanna Overholser (divorce c. 1880); Anna Ione Murphy Overholser (1872-1940)
- Children: Ed Overholser (1869-1931); Elizabeth Overholser; Henry Ione Perry (1904-1959)
- Parent(s): John Overholser; Elizabeth (Niswonger) Overholser

Henry Overholser (April 14, 1846 – August 25, 1915) was an American businessman, county commissioner, and important contributor to the development of Oklahoma City. He was the first to erect two-story buildings in the city, both of which were torn down in 1907. Overholser's son from a first marriage, Edward, was a mayor of Oklahoma City.

== Early life ==
Overholser was born April 14, 1846, on a farm in Montgomery County, Ohio, the son of John and Elizabeth (Niswonger) Overholser. He was one of 13 children.

Overholser married Emma Hannah and, on June 20, 1869, she gave birth to a son, Edward in Sullivan, Indiana The couple had a second child also, Elizabeth, who married George Pirtle and she used the name "Queen". They lived in Kansas and had two sons. Overholser worked in the mercantile business in Sullivan for 13 years. He started various real estate and building enterprises in Colorado and Ashland, Wisconsin before moving to Oklahoma Territory.

== Oklahoma City ==
Overholser had already made a fortune when he arrived in Oklahoma Territory in 1889. He quickly began buying lots, developing business buildings, and making capital improvements using his own money to what would become Oklahoma City Overholser married Anna Ione Murphy on October 23, 1889. His brother, Levi, and nephew, Will, lived in one of his buildings on West Grand in 1889.

Overholser ran unsuccessfully for mayor two times, but did succeed in becoming a county commissioner of Oklahoma County. He built the Overholser Opera House on Grand Avenue for $108,000 in 1903 and the Overholser Theater. In 1905, Henry and Anna Overholser had their only child together; a daughter, Henry Ione Overholser.

With collaborator Charles G. Jones, he was instrumental in the creation of two railways important to Oklahoma City: the St. Louis and Oklahoma City Railroad in 1895, and the Oklahoma City Terminal Railroad in 1900.

Just before statehood in 1906, Overholser helped the local chamber of commerce purchase land for the State Fair of Oklahoma, giving it a permanent home. He served on the fair's board for numerous years.

== Overholser Mansion ==
A prominent mansion in Oklahoma City stands as testament to the Overholser family. The 20-room, brick-and-stone Victorian mansion lies in Heritage Hills and was built in 1903. It passed through the family until it was transferred to David Perry, the husband of Overholser's daughter, after her death. In the 1970s, the mansion was donated to the state and is currently maintained as a historic house museum by Preservation Oklahoma through an agreement with the Oklahoma Historical Society.
