= List of Arkansas suffragists =

This is a list of Arkansas suffragists, suffrage groups and others associated with the cause of women's suffrage in Arkansas.

== Groups ==
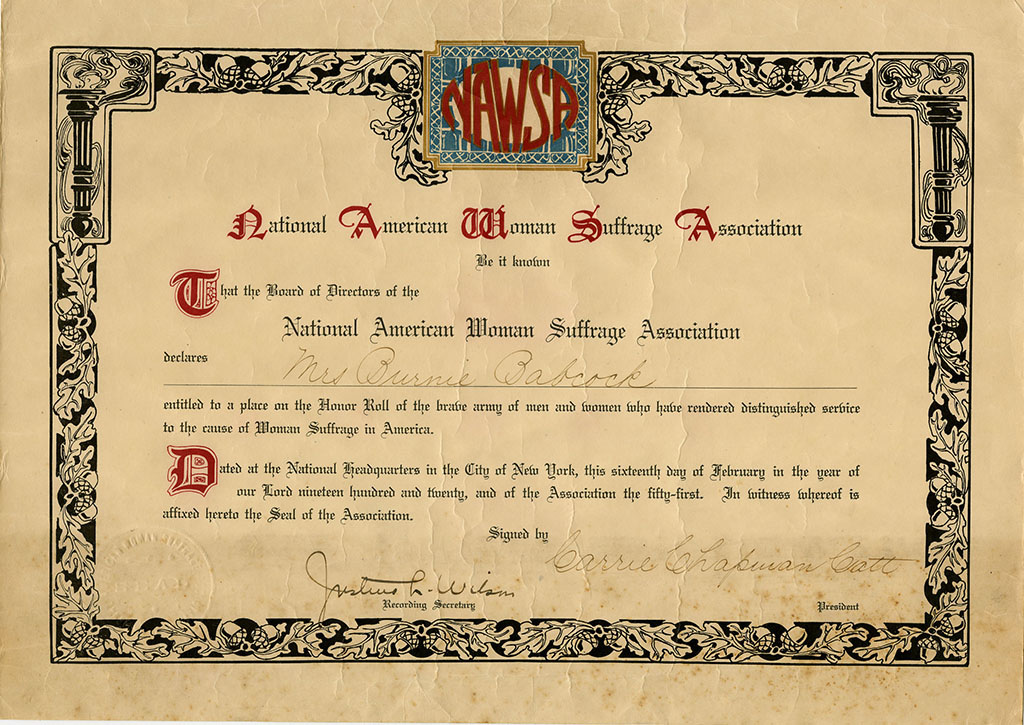
NAWSA certificate for Bernie Babcock, 1920

- Arkansas Equal Suffrage Association (AESA), organized in 1888.
- Arkansas Federation of Women's Clubs (AFWC).
- Arkansas Woman Suffrage Association (AWSA), formed in 1881.
- The second iteration of the Arkansas Woman Suffrage Association (AWSA), created in 1914. It was also known as the Arkansas Equal Suffrage Central Committee (AESCC).
- Washington County Women's Suffrage Association, formed in 1915.
- Women's Political Equality League (PEL), starts meeting in 1913.

== Suffragists ==
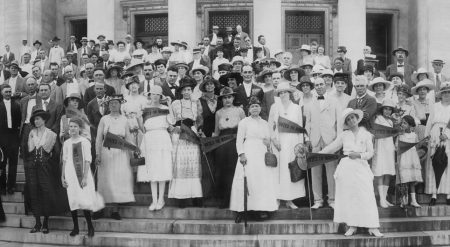
Women's suffrage delegation at the Arkansas State Capitol in Little Rock, 1917

- Freda Hogan Ameringer (Huntington).
- Bernie Babcock (Little Rock).
- Ida Jones Brooks (Little Rock).
- Mary Burt Brooks.
- Haryot Holt Cahoon.
- Hattie Wyatt Caraway.
- Fannie L. Chunn (Little Rock).
- Florence Brown Cotnam (Little Rock).
- Catherine Campbell Cunningham (Little Rock).
- Alice S. Ellington.
- Pauline Floyd (El Dorado).
- Minnie Rutherford Fuller (Little Rock).
- Lizzie Dorman Fyler (Eureka Springs).
- Olive Gatlin Leigh.
- Jean Vernor Jennings (Little Rock).
- Adele Johnson (Hot Springs).
- Mary W. Loughborough (Little Rock).
- Josephine Miller (Little Rock).
- James Mitchell (Little Rock).
- Clara McDiarmid (Little Rock).
- Adolphine Fletcher Terry (1882–1976) – author, advocate for women's suffrage, education reform and social justice in Arkansas.
- Gertrude Watkins (Little Rock).

=== Politicians supporting women's suffrage ===
- E.P. Hill.
- Miles Ledford Langley (Arkadelphia).
- John A. Riggs (Garland County).
- George P. Whittington (Hot Springs).

== Places ==
- Little Rock City Hall.

== Publications ==
- Woman's Chronicle.

== Suffragists campaigning in Arkansas ==
- Susan B. Anthony.
- Carrie Chapman Catt.
- Phoebe Couzins.
- Frances A. Griffin.
- Lide Meriwether.
- Alice Paul.
- Anna Howard Shaw.
- Mabel Vernon.
- Frances Woods.

== Anti-suffragists in Arkansas ==
People

- Walker Smith (Magnolia).

== See also ==
- Timeline of women's suffrage in Arkansas
- Women's suffrage in Arkansas
- Women's suffrage in states of the United States
- Women's suffrage in the United States
- Women's poll tax repeal movement
