= Women's suffrage in Arkansas =

Aspect of women's history

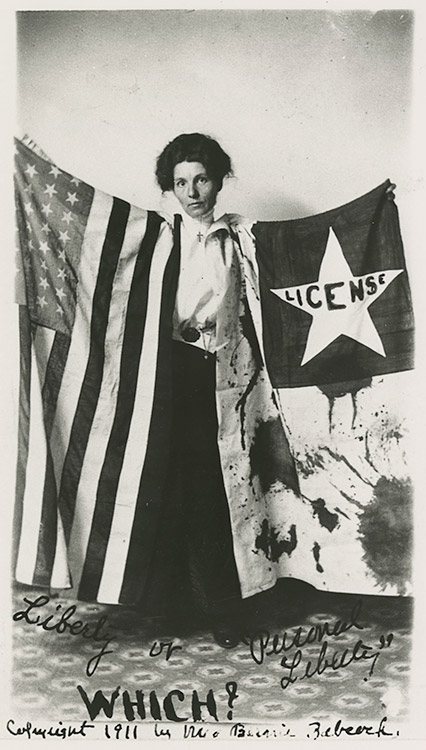
Bernie Babcock with flags, 1911

Women's suffrage had early champions among men in Arkansas. Miles Ledford Langley of Arkadelphia, Arkansas proposed a women's suffrage clause during the 1868 Arkansas Constitutional Convention. Educator, James Mitchell wanted to see a world where his daughters had equal rights. The first woman's suffrage group in Arkansas was organized by Lizzie Dorman Fyler in 1881. A second women's suffrage organization was formed by Clara McDiarmid in 1888. McDiarmid was very influential on women's suffrage work in the last few decades of the nineteenth century. When she died in 1899, suffrage work slowed down, but did not all-together end. Both Bernie Babcock and Jean Vernor Jennings continued to work behind the scenes. In the 1910s, women's suffrage work began to increase again. socialist women, like Freda Hogan were very involved in women's suffrage causes. Other social activists, like Minnie Rutherford Fuller became involved in the Political Equality League (PEL) founded in 1911 by Jennings. Another statewide suffrage group, also known as the Arkansas Woman Suffrage Association (AWSA) was organized in 1914. AWSA decided to work towards helping women vote in the important primary elections in the state. The first woman to address the Arkansas General Assembly was suffragist Florence Brown Cotnam who spoke in favor of a women's suffrage amendment on February 5, 1915. While that amendment was not completely successful, Cotnam was able to persuade the Arkansas governor to hold a special legislative session in 1917. That year Arkansas women won the right to vote in primary elections. In May 1918, between 40,000 and 50,000 white women voted in the primaries. African American voters were restricted from voting in primaries in the state. Further efforts to amend the state constitution took place in 1918, but were also unsuccessful. When the Nineteenth Amendment passed the United States Congress, Arkansas held another special legislative session in July 1919. The amendment was ratified on July 28 and Arkansas became the twelfth state to ratify the Nineteenth Amendment.

== Early efforts ==
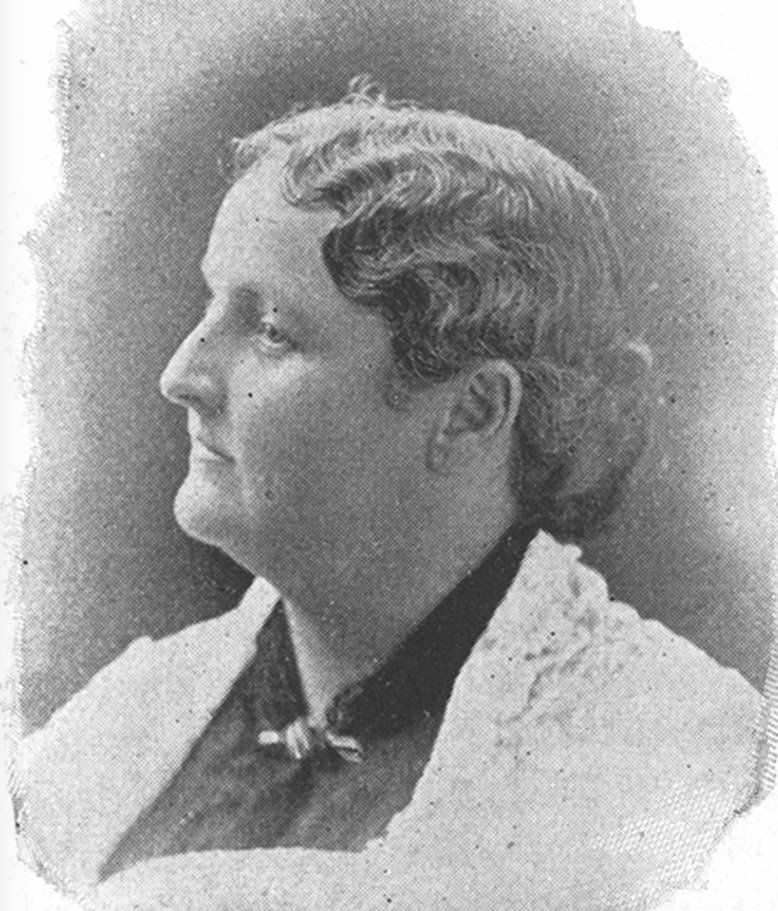
Clara McDiarmid

During the 1868 Arkansas Constitutional Convention, delegate Miles Ledford Langley from Arkadelphia, proposed an equal suffrage addition to the state constitution. Langley's language would provide for any literate citizen over the age of 21 to vote. On February 12, 1868, he addressed the Arkansas House of Representatives on why women's suffrage was necessary. His speech in favor of women's rights was ridiculed by many of the delegates. When women's suffrage was rejected and not included in the state constitution, Langley wrote to Susan B. Anthony and apologized that Arkansas had not given women their "God-given and well-earned rights of civil and political equality." Other men in Arkansas, like James Mitchell, felt that it was necessary for women to have equal rights, including suffrage, to have economic justice. Mitchell also hoped that his daughters would live in a more equal world. Suffragist Phoebe Couzins visited Little Rock in 1870, where she spoke on women's suffrage.

Lizzie Dorman Fyler organized the Arkansas Woman Suffrage Association (AWSA) in Eureka Springs, Arkansas by September 1881. Fyler was a lawyer and worked in the temperance movement. In 1884, Mary W. Loughborough started a woman's magazine called the Arkansas Ladies' Journal. The journal was not explicitly pro-suffrage, but hinted that women should be involved in politics. Also in 1884, Fyler attended the annual convention of the National Woman Suffrage Association (NAWSA), where she was the first delegate from Arkansas. Before Fyler died, she dissolved AWSA in October 1885. Another suffrage group that went by different names was founded by Clara McDiarmid, a Women's Christian Temperance Union (WCTU) officer, in 1888 in Little Rock. McDiarmid, a former resident of Kansas, was upset that she lost some of her rights in the move to Arkansas. A month after the formation of the new Little Rock suffrage group, the women started a journal called the Woman's Chronicle. The journal, edited by and for women, was a major source of information for Southern suffragists and temperance activists. Editor, Catherine Cunningham, shared that she received "much adverse criticism" due to her work on the journal. In March 1893, the last edition was published because of the editor, Cunningham, experienced an illness. In 1895, Lide Meriwether, a suffragists from Tennessee, spoke in many Arkansas cities, sometimes bringing the first women's suffrage lecture the citizens had ever seen.

In 1889, Susan B. Anthony toured Little Rock and other Arkansas towns. Anthony was well received by large audiences. The first suffrage parade in Arkansas was held in 1890 in Little Rock. In 1891, legislator E. P. Hill introduced a women's suffrage bill for "white women." The bill was not successful, and was probably unconstitutional. Hill again sponsored a women's suffrage bill, meant to allow women to vote for school boards, in March 1893. The bill passed the Senate, but not the House. A similar bill was presented by Senator Turner Butler in 1899, but again failed. When McDiarmid died in 1899, the suffrage movement in Arkansas slowed down. Several individuals attempted to keep the movement alive, but McDiarmid's death was a strong blow to the activists.

During the slow years, Jean Vernor Jennings kept the suffrage movement in Arkansas alive. Her nickname was "the keeper of the light." Another suffragist who continued to work on women's suffrage was Bernie Babcock who corresponded in the early 1900s with individuals in other countries to find out the status of women's rights in different places.

== Partial suffrage ==
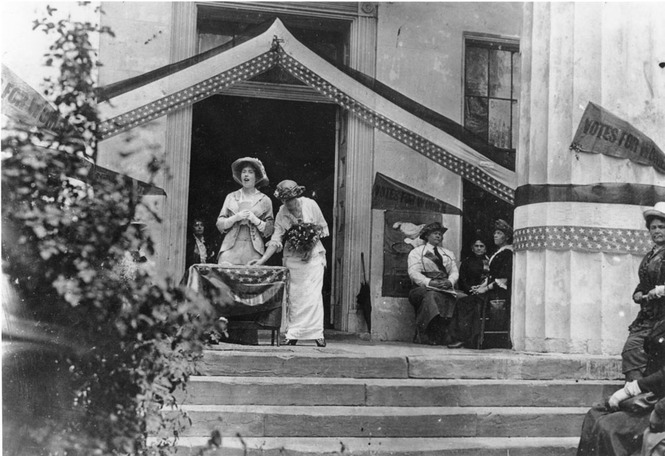
Suffrage Day at the Old State House in Arkansas, May 2, 1914

In the 1910s, Socialist women were very involved with promoting women's suffrage in Arkansas. Freda Hogan was an extremely active suffragist in the Socialist Party. in 1915, she joined the Socialist Party's Woman's National Committee (WNC) to help organize women and promote women's suffrage.

In 1911, Jennings was a founding member of the Political Equality League (PEL). The group was formed partly because of a pro-women's suffrage article written by Mrs. D. D. Terry in the Arkansas Gazette. Minnie Rutherford Fuller, a social activist, was one of the founders of PEL. For Fuller, women's suffrage would help the passage of the kinds of reforms and community improvement that she supported. Fuller and Olive Gatlin Leigh testified in 1911 about proposed suffrage legislation at a Committee meeting held at the Marion Hotel.

In October 1914, a State Woman Suffrage Association, also known as the Arkansas Woman Suffrage Association (AWSA), was formed. The group had the same name as the earlier suffrage group started by Fyler years ago. Alice S. Ellington was the first president. The new AWSA planned to work on fighting for women's right to vote in primary elections in the state. In Arkansas, most of the elections that really mattered were decided in the primary elections. In 1915, delegates of the Arkansas Federation of Woman's Clubs (AFWC) fully endorsed women's suffrage. Fuller, also active in the AFWC, continued to support the idea that women could better enact social change if they were able to vote. Florence Brown Cotnam was elected president of the PEL in 1915.

On February 5, 1915, Cotnam was the first woman to speak on the floor of the General Assembly. She was there to testify in favor of the joint resolution for a state constitutional amendment to give women full suffrage. The amendment passed, but was unable to be placed on the ballot due to technical reasons.

Cotnam helped persuade Governor Charles Hillman Brough to call a special legislative session to consider a primary election vote in 1917. State Representative John A. Riggs sponsored a bill for women to vote in primary elections. The bill was based on the text of one proposed earlier in Texas. Cotnam testified in front of the General Assembly on women's suffrage during this time. The bill passed easily in the House with 71 votes for and 19 against. On February 27, 1917, the state Senate considered the bill and the gallery was crowded with spectators watching the event. After a "spirited debate," the bill was adopted. Fuller, who had helped lead the suffragists during the consideration of the bill, was credited with helping secure the win. Arkansas became the first state that did not have equal suffrage to allow women to vote in primary elections.

After the primary suffrage bill passed, Hogan organized women in Huntington, Arkansas. She also helped organize 67 women in Huntington to pay their poll taxes in advance so they would be ready to vote. The State Woman Suffrage Association reorganized as the Equal Suffrage State Central Committee (ESSCC, also known as the Arkansas Equal Suffrage Central Committee) and Ellington served as the first chair. In May 1918, between 40,000 and 50,000 Arkansas women voted in their first primary election. Because of a previous ban enacted in 1906 on African Americans voting in primary elections, only white women were voting in the first primaries.

== Fighting for equal suffrage ==
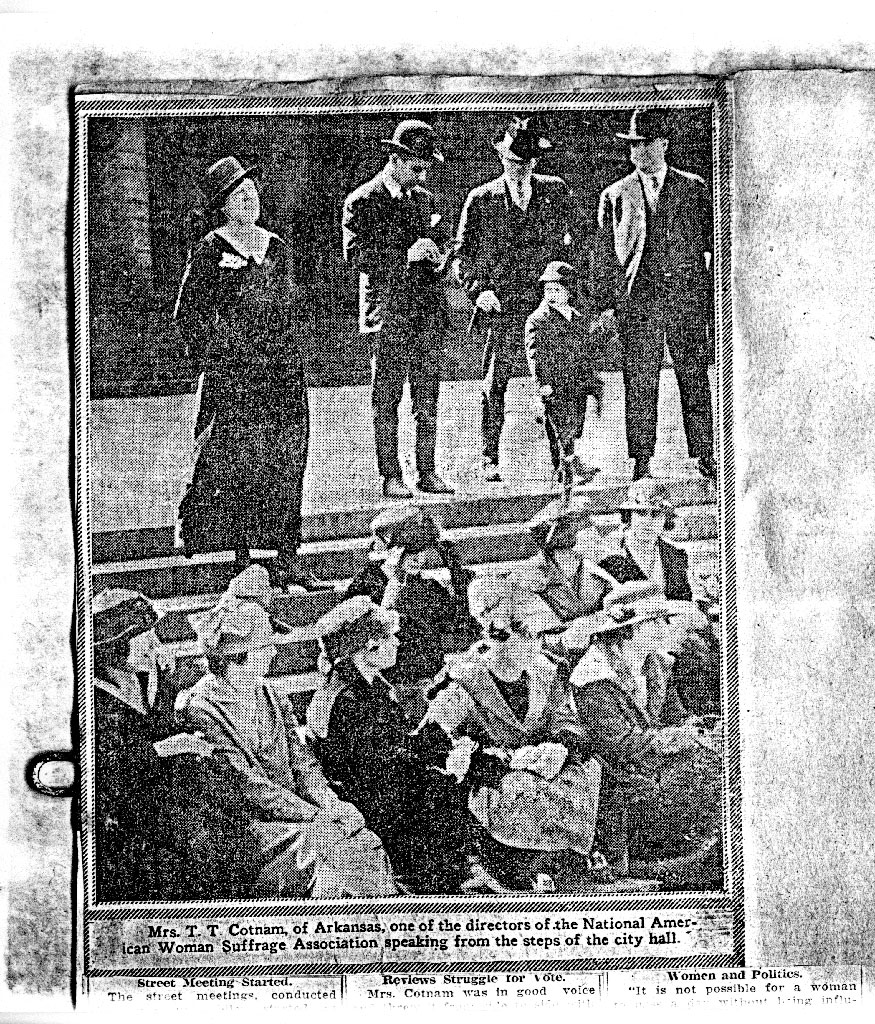
Florence Brown Cotnam speaking on the steps of city hall

The ESSCC had new leadership in August 1917, with Cotnam taking over as the new chair. The group decided to take a new direction and put their efforts into campaigning for a federal suffrage amendment. The NWP Little Rock branch joined ESSCC in their efforts.

During a state constitutional convention in July 1918, members of ESSCC worked to influence a women's suffrage amendment to the proposed constitutional changes. On the third day of the convention, a women's suffrage clause was adopted, but was removed because the clause also contained other issues that would cause too many issues to resolve during the convention. In the end, the changes to the Arkansas Constitution were rejected during a special election held on December 13, 1918.

Another event taking place in Arkansas in July 1918 was the state Democratic Party convention which included women delegates for the first time. Delegates met on July 10 in Little Rock and women were involved in committees and on the platform. The woman delegates wrote a women's suffrage platform plank which was adopted by all members of the convention.

When the Nineteenth Amendment went to the states for ratification, suffragists urged their legislators to call for a special legislative session. Many legislators replied promptly that they were interested in opening a special session. A committee of 50 suffragists went to urge Governor Brough to call for the session. He agreed, setting the date for July 28, 1919. When the votes were taken, both the state House and Senate voted overwhelmingly to ratify the amendment on the same day. Arkansas became the twelfth state to ratify the Nineteenth Amendment.

On December 3, 1919, the ESSCC dissolved and reformed as the League of Women Voters (LWV) of Arkansas with Cotnam as president. She also later became president of the LWV of Little Rock. Cotnam helped educate women about voting and politics in citizenship schools held around the country after the passage of the Nineteenth Amendment.

== Anti-suffragism in Arkansas ==
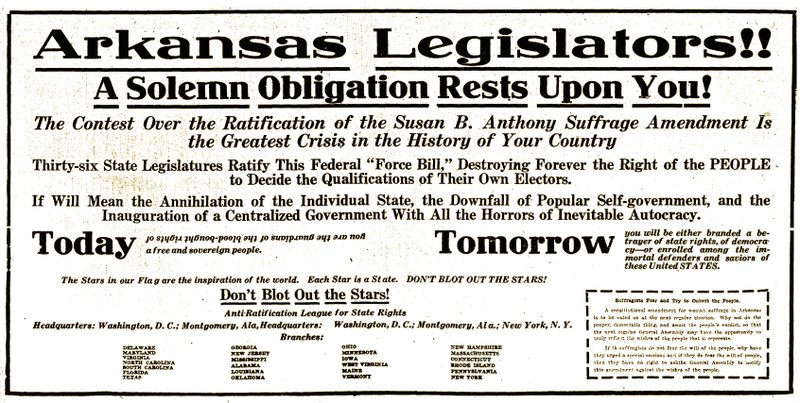
"Arkansas Legislators!!" Anti-suffrage ad from the Anti-Ratification League for States Rights, July 27, 1919

One anti-suffrage argument used in Arkansas was that women really didn't want to vote and wouldn't exercise their rights if they were enfranchised. Another argument against women's suffrage was that since women did not serve in the Army, they should not be allowed to vote.

Women who were anti-suffragist or who were hesitant to support the idea fully often argued that women were better suited to change laws, ideas, and policies through using their lobbying influence and other indirect techniques. Women often worked to influence the men in their lives to vote for issues they were interested in.

== See also ==
- List of Arkansas suffragists
- Timeline of women's suffrage in Arkansas
- Women's suffrage in states of the United States
- Women's suffrage in the United States
- Women's poll tax repeal movement
