= Ameringer =

Ameringer is a surname. Notable people with the surname include:

- Freda Ameringer (1892–1988), American socialist organizer
- Oscar Ameringer (1870–1943), German-American socialist editor, author, and organizer
