= Socialist Party of Oklahoma =

Semi-autonomous affiliate of the Socialist Party of America

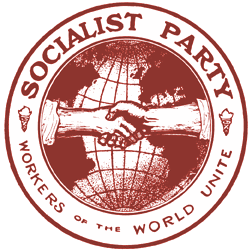
- Abbreviation: SPO
- Founded: 1901
- Ideology: Social democracy Socialism; Agrarian socialism
- Political position: Left-wing
- National affiliation: Socialist Party of America

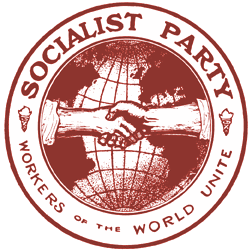
The Socialist Party of Oklahoma was a state affiliate of the Socialist Party of America, established in 1901

Oklahoma was the 46th state admitted to the United States, gaining statehood in November 1907

The Socialist Party of Oklahoma was a semi-autonomous affiliate of the Socialist Party of America located in the Southwestern state of Oklahoma. One of the last states admitted to the Union, the area later incorporated into Oklahoma had been previously used for reservations to which indigenous Native American populations were deported, with the area formally divided after 1890 into two entities — an "Oklahoma Territory" in the West and an "Indian Territory" in the East.

In April 1889 some 2 million acres of unassigned lands in the future Oklahoma Territory were opened up to non-Native American settlement in the first of a series of Oklahoma land runs. Dominated by agriculture in an often harsh climate, the Oklahoma Territory was in this period one of the last undeveloped frontiers of the continental United States. With the regional economy dominated by the massive economic power of great railroads and large financial entities, an ethic of agrarian radicalism developed among many of Oklahoma's debt-ridden and impoverished small-holding farmers. Powered more by religious fervor than by Marxist ideology, substantial sections of the People's Party and its eventual successor, the Socialist Party, sprung forth from the Oklahoma soil.

As the first decade of the 20th century drew to a close, the Socialist Party of Oklahoma was one of the most dominant state organizations of the national party, gaining the support of nearly one in five Oklahoma voters and electing candidates to office in various locales around the state.

This boom was followed by a bust, however. The anti-militarist stance taken by the Socialist Party towards World War I was deeply unpopular with many of the organization's generally patriotic rural party members and provoked disruptive and sometimes violent reactions by others in the community. In August 1917 a failed armed march on Washington, DC remembered to history as the Green Corn Rebellion, organized by a local radical organization close to the Industrial Workers of the World, was blamed on the Socialists. The massive public outrage which followed prompted the dismantling of the state organization. By 1920 organized socialism in Oklahoma had been almost completely extinguished.

A fledgling Oklahoma state socialist organization was reestablished in 1928 and grew somewhat during the first half of the 1930s during the years of the Great Depression.

== Organizational history ==
=== Background ===
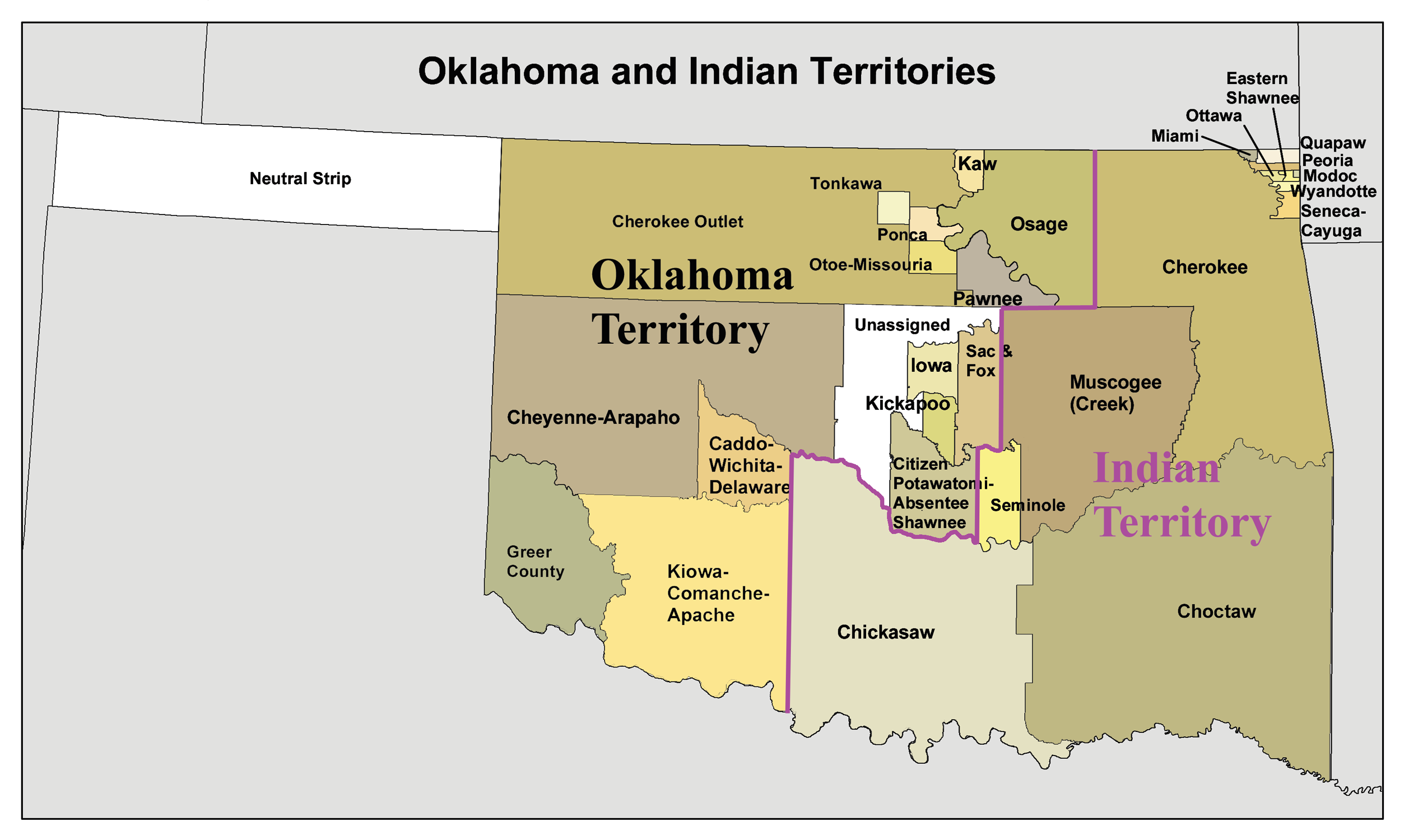
Map of the Oklahoma Territory and Indian Territory from the period preceding statehood in 1907.

The "Oklahoma lands" — the entire future state of Oklahoma with the exception of the narrow western panhandle — were first set aside as a site to which Native American populations were to be deported from their ancestral homelands in the 1830s. It was there that the so-called "Five Civilized Tribes" — the Cherokee, Seminole, Choctaw, Chickasaw, and Muscogee (Creek) peoples — were relocated at that time, clearing the way for European-American colonization of their previous lands. Following the conclusion of the American Civil War the Federal government used the fact of these five Native American peoples' support of the Confederate States of America as a pretext for retaking approximately half of these "Oklahoma lands." This freed new area for additional forced relocations of other Native American peoples.

In the years after the civil war the "Oklahoma lands" were administratively divided, with the Eastern territory remaining in the possession of the Cherokee, Seminole, Choctaw, Chickasaw, and Muscogee designated the Indian Territory and the Western area given the official designation Oklahoma Territory. It was originally envisioned that part of this land ceded back to the Federal government after the conclusion of the Civil War would be used for the settlement of freed African-American slaves, but no such systematic relocation campaign was conducted.

At the end of the 1880s, nearly two million acres (810,000 hectares) of unused land remained in the Federal inventory at the center of the present state. With little other free land available on the American frontier, public pressure grew for this land to be made available for settlement. Expectant settlers known as "Boomers" began to organize in neighboring Kansas, agitating the government to open the Unassigned Lands for settlement and promising the mutual support of their members for the establishment of their individual claims. Attempts were made by some of these Boomers to squat claims, which were met by ineffectual government dispersals of illegal settlers and their subsequent re-invasion of illegally claimed lands.

Public pressure and the ongoing pattern of illegal occupation began to move the wheels of government towards a fundamental transformation of its Indian policy. The Dawes Act of 1887 authorized the dismantling of collectively held tribal lands into individual allotments and signaled an intention to open the whole of the Unassigned Lands to parcelization and allocation to private landholders. Whereas commonly held tribal lands were unlikely to be leased out to white settlers, the Dawes Act with its individually owned parcels ranging from 60 to 320 acres created a situation in which individuals could be persuaded to make transactions that tribal governments would not.

The fragmentation of the collectively owned tribal lands was followed in April 1889 by the first and largest of a series of officially sanctioned Oklahoma land runs, in which prospective settlers rushed to stake claims to parcels previously part of the Unassigned Lands. Oklahoma became the new Kansas — a bustling, hardscrabble, agrarian frontier economy emerged, with Oklahoma City the nexus of the Oklahoma Colony.

White settlers flocked to the state in search of nominally priced virgin agricultural land. By August 1889 nearly 6,000 claims were filed on over 900,000 acres of land. The next year would see another 7,000 claims putting a million more acres behind fences. By 1901 virtually all the Oklahoma Territory — the western half of today's Oklahoma, land previously set-aside for displaced Native American populations — was in the hands of European-American homesteaders.

=== Oklahoma populism ===
Map illustrating the "Unassigned Lands" in 1887.

Obtaining land proved to be the simple part of the economic equation for the white newcomers to the Oklahoma Territory. Life proved difficult. The timing of the April 1889 land dash made the growing of a crop in the first year nigh impossible. Settlers, many of whom were of limited financial means to begin with, were forced to draw down the stocks of provisions which they carried with them to their new homesteads. Homes were built and wells dug, but 1890 was a year of severe drought, which made a second consecutive year of no farm income for many settlers.

Thugs squatting on prime land sometimes kept their rightful owners off their own property until matters could be litigated in court, further impeding the development of viable farms. Speculators claimed prime land and access to transportation and water. Some lost their claims and were rendered landless owing to a lack of funds to pay legal fees. Exacerbating these problems, for a full year no territorial government existed to adjudicate the myriad of legal issues which emerged.

On top of the difficulties faced in the launching of a new agricultural economy came the insertion from neighboring states of a resource-draining financial and business apparatus. Few Oklahomans had the financial resources to go into business for themselves on more than a personal subsistence level and a seller's market prevailed.

A costly credit system emerged in which merchants would frequently charge substantially higher prices for wares purchased on credit and then levy heavy interest rates on the unpaid balance — combined costs which could add as much as 50% to the total purchase price. Many were forced to mortgage their furniture and basic possessions at exorbitant interest rates in order to make ends meet. Defaulting families lost their possessions and were reduced into still more dire living conditions. Poverty was endemic. Nearly a decade after the great land grab of 1889, one study estimated the value of the furniture owned by the average Oklahoman family at just $7.50.

The widespread economic misery had the effect of radicalizing a significant segment of the Oklahoma population. This found expression in the 1890 establishment of the People's Party (commonly known as the "Populists") in Oklahoma in the summer of 1890. On June 21, 1890, representatives of the Farmers' Alliance, the Knights of Labor, and the Union Labor Party gathered in Oklahoma City for pre-convention planning. The group set August 13, 1890 as the date for the first territorial convention of the new political organization, which sought to challenge the dominant Democratic and less potent Republican parties in the Oklahoma Territory. The selection of this date proved unfortunate, however, as Governor George Washington Steele subsequently announced August 5 — a week ahead of the scheduled organizing convention — as the date for the election of a territorial legislature.

Despite being surprised by the snap election, the Populists still managed to win election to several seats in the first territorial legislature, including a sweep of Payne County's senator and three representatives and winning another seat in Payne County. People's Party supporters tended to be Northern-born, while the Democrats were skewed towards the Southern born. The Republicans tended to split the Northern-born vote with the Populists, dominated by those hailing from New England, while People's Party supporters tended to be of Midwestern origins. Six Republicans, 5 Democrats, 1 Populist, and 1 Republican-leaning Independent were elected to the 1890 Oklahoma Territorial Council (Senate), while the first House of Representatives included 14 Republicans, 8 Democrats, and 4 Populists. Oklahoma was, in short, a three party state from the outset.

The People's Party remained an extremely effective political entity for two more election cycles. In 1892 the Oklahoma People's Party advanced a full slate of its candidates, committed to the third party approach but relegated to third place. In the elections of November 1894, however, the People's Party seemed to break through, outpolling the candidate of the Democratic Party for Congress by drawing 33% of the vote in a losing effort.

The party was ultimately shattered in 1896 amidst a bitter division between "fusionists" who sought to cooperate with the Democratic Party headed by William Jennings Bryan, who seemed to share some of the Populists' programmatic interests and those who wished to "stick to the middle of the road" by nominating a full slate of candidates in the name of the People's Party. The victory of the "fusionists" over "mid-road" adherents, followed by Bryan's defeat at the polls in 1896 proved a near mortal blow to the People's Party, which very nearly dissolved in the aftermath. It would be the Democratic Party which would survive, with many former Populists moving over to the support of that organization.

The ground was cleared for a new political organization to represent the interests of common people against the monied interests which dominated each of the "old parties."

=== The Indiahoma Farmers' Union ===
With the effective demise of the People's Party, a new organization game to the fore to advance the issues of the impoverished small-holding and tenant farmers of the Oklahoma and Indian Territories. This was to be the Indiahoma Farmers' Union (IFU), a new entity harkening back to the Farmers' Alliance which was headed by a former Populist named Newt Gresham. The IFU was patterned after a similar organization established in neighboring Texas in 1902. Expansion was made northward into the Oklahoma and Indian Territories the following year. The fledgling organization remained part of the Texas Farmers' Union until early in 1905, when it was granted organizational independence and formally adopted the Indiahoma Farmers' Union

The Indiahoma Farmers' Union was an organization founded around the idea of advancing cooperative enterprise.

=== Socialist Party of America ===
Far from improving, the conditions faced by Oklahoma's small-holding and tenant farmers remained abysmal into the first years of the 20th century. Farmers continued to suffer greatly unfavorable terms for credit or rent while receiving extremely low prices for the cotton, corn, and wheat which they produced. Southern agriculture was the hardest hit in the nation, and the regional blight which plagued the cotton economy impacted even the Southwestern state of Oklahoma. By 1910 half the farmers of the South worked on land which they did not own, with between one-quarter and one-half of their annual production lost off the top to rent. The average income of such farmers in Oklahoma was estimated in one contemporary study at just $200 per year.

On December 27, 1899 a territorial meeting of Oklahoma socialists was held in a hall located above the old post office building in Oklahoma City, with 32 delegates representing 10 of the state's 23 counties in attendance. A committee was established to investigate establishing a socialist newspaper for the territory. The gathering was addressed by William Gibbs, a black teacher from Guthrie who was elected to the party's executive committee, about the relation between black people and socialism.

A 14-member permanent territorial socialist committee was established, including both white and black members, and H.E. Farnsworth of Newkirk was selected as Territorial Secretary. The decision was made to remain independent of any national organization until some plan of union of the dissident Socialist Labor Party headed by Henry Slobodin and Morris Hillquit and the Chicago-based Social Democratic Party of Victor L. Berger and Eugene V. Debs could be effected. The name "Socialist Party of Oklahoma" was adopted until such time that national affiliation could be concluded.

Organized in August 1901, the Socialist Party of America further carried on the legacy of the Farmers' Alliance and the People's Party. Although nominally a Marxist party based upon the idea of organization of the working class, in Oklahoma the impoverished and exploited small-holders and tenant farmers were seen as a sort of "substitute proletariat" by Socialist activists. One prominent party organizer, Oscar Ameringer, declared after his extensive travels throughout the state that "Oklahoma farmers' standard of living was so far below the sweatshop workers of the New York east side that comparison should not be thought of." Such farmers were "as wretched a set of slaves as ever walked the face of the earth, anywhere or at any time," Ameringer opined.

=== Growth ===
The Socialist Party of Oklahoma took its biggest steps forward in size and influence as the first decade of the 20th century came to a close, with the decline of the Farmers' Union opened the door for the Socialists organizationally. In 1908 the party for the first time attempted to mobilize tenant farmers through inclusion of "land planks" in the electoral platform.

The Oklahoma effort was aided by Julius Wayland and his widely circulated weekly, The Appeal to Reason, which published a special Oklahoma edition in 1908. The party's effort were rewarded, with Socialist candidates in the poorest cotton-growing areas of the state garnering the party's highest level of voter support. In certain counties the Socialist Presidential ticket of Eugene V. Debs and Ben Hanford drew a quarter of the votes cast. Statewide, the Debs-Hanford ticket won 21,425 votes — just short of 8.5% of the total ballots cast. The final departure of the People's Party from the political scene after the 1908 election further broadened Socialist horizons.

At the time of the 1908 campaign an astonishing 375 locals of the Socialist Party were scattered across the state of Oklahoma, working in support of candidates in 5 Congressional Districts, 12 State Senatorial Districts, and 35 Assembly Districts. The SPO maintained a corps of 15 traveling organizers in the field, with no fewer than 4 of these on tour at any one time. A movement was begun for the establishment of a Socialist daily newspaper in Oklahoma City.

The Socialists further advanced their demand for "constant enlargement of the public domain" on behalf of tenant farmers during the next election cycle. Oklahoma Socialists attempted to push the wage-labor-oriented Socialist Party to pass an agricultural program at its 1910 "National Congress," aided by Midwesterners Algie M. Simons and Kate Richards O'Hare. The agriculturally oriented Oklahoma party's call for the expansion of state ownership of farmland for the benefit of landless tenants, funded by stringent taxes upon land speculators, went unheeded.

In 1910, a grandfather clause for voting was submitted as a referendum by the Oklahoma legislature. Branstetter criticized this referendum as an attempt to disenfranchise the state's black population and formed a committee including Ameringer and Jack Hazel to oppose it. Patrick S. Nagle, the party's lawyer, filed a lawsuit to stop the referendum. The SPA voted to add support for unrestricted suffrage to its platform in 1910, and Ameringer wrote a 2,500 word party statement against the referendum. However, the referendum was approved by voters. 2/3rds of the state's black population was disenfranchised by the clause. In Guinn v. United States, the Supreme Court of the United States ruled against the state's grandfather clause. A literacy test referendum was held in 1916, but was defeated due to opposition from the Republicans and Socialists.

In 1911, Ameringer made a major push into politics running for mayor of Oklahoma City. He gathered twenty-three percent of the vote. In 1912, the Oklahoma Socialist Party voted to abolish the Oklahoma Pioneer as its official newspaper and a year later recalled Ameringer from his seat on the National Executive Committee. In 1931, Ameringer returned to Oklahoma and founded the American Guardian, which remained in circulation until 1942.

The rise of the party in Oklahoma was accompanied by a degree of factional tension, with its rank and file being dominated by the left-wing "Reds" who supported a decentralized form of organization, and its most prominent leaders including social democratic "Yellows" such as Ameringer and Otto Branstetter who wanted to implement more centralized structures along the lines of those established by Victor Berger in Milwaukee. Ameringer and Branstetter were removed from their roles in the state party in 1913 as a result of factional infighting.

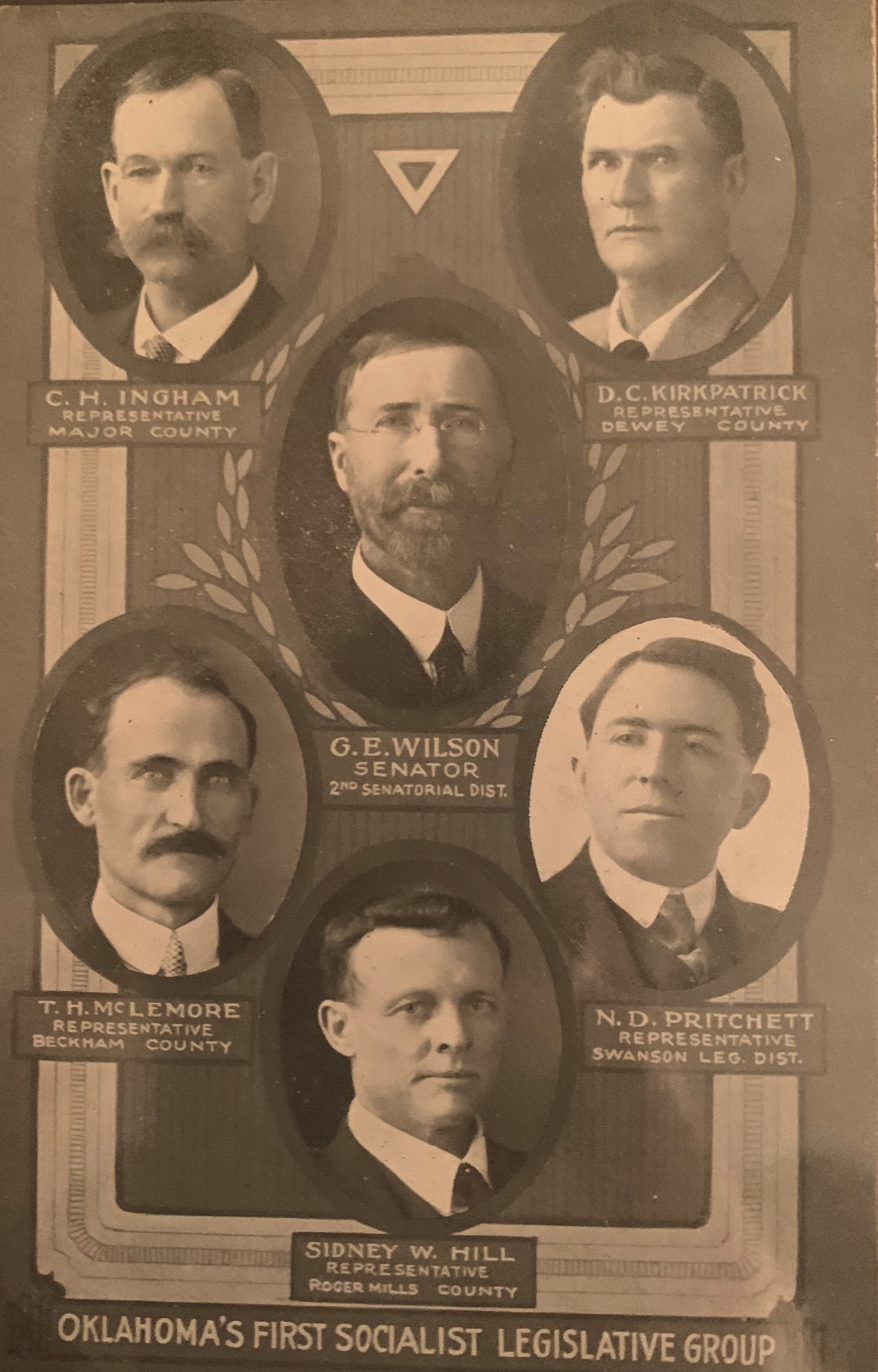
The six socialists elected to the Oklahoma Legislature in 1914.

In 1914, the SPO had over 800 locals and over 175 elected officials, including six state legislators - the second largest caucus of Socialist state legislators in the country, after Wisconsin. In that year's gubernatorial election, Socialist candidate Fred W. Holt took 20 percent of the vote. In the mid-1910s the party claimed around 10,000 members, giving it the highest membership per capita of any state affiliate of the Socialist Party. In the aftermath of the 1914 campaign, one friendly analyst offered reasons for the growth and success of the Socialist Party in the state:

"The first is the intelligence of the Oklahoma farmer, who reads a great deal, and the constant political agitation in Oklahoma, giving him an opportunity to hear the political situation discussed. He has discovered that he is not getting a square deal. Another reason for the gain of the Socialist vote and the loss of the Democratic vote in Oklahoma is the revolt against the corrupt conditions in Oklahoma politics."

While nationally the Democratic Party made inroads among progressive voters in 1916 behind Presidential nominee Woodrow Wilson and his anti-interventionist campaign slogan "He Kept Us Out of War," the Socialist Party retained substantial support in the cotton- and wheat-growing regions of Oklahoma. In the November 1916 elections Socialists maintaining at least a 20% share of the vote in 22 counties, with the percentage in some rural precincts hitting the 50% mark. The Socialist presidential ticket headed by Allan L. Benson gained 15% of the state vote, nearly equalling the 16% cast for Eugene V. Debs by Oklahoma voters in the previous election.

=== Socialist encampments ===
One particularly effective technique in building the socialist movement in Oklahoma surrounded the use of Socialist encampments, camping excursions in the countryside patterned off Protestant revival meetings and used previously in the state by the populist movement. In his 1940 memoir veteran socialist Ameringer remembered the Oklahoma encampments at length:

"These encampments were lineal descendants of the religious and Populist camp meetings of former days. They usually lasted a full week. The audience came in covered wagons from as far as 70 miles around. We furnished water, firewood, and toilet facilities. The pilgrims brought their own commissary, cooked, ate, and slept on the ground or in their covered wagons. Besides a large circus tent, we carried cooking and sleeping tents for the crew. Expenses were defrayed from collections taken at meetings and funds raised by chambers of commerce in the nearest trading centers...

"These encampments were attended by an average of 5,000 people, and they meant business. Furthermore, they were welcome because they brought customers together and stimulated business....

"In the course of the encampment we often arranged horseback parades through the town proper. Many of the younger people had arrived on horseback. Others rode the horses and mules of their covered wagons. A few thousand men riding through a town of perhaps not twice that many inhabitants looked like the migration of nations. Or at least it looked as though the social revolution were just around the corner..."

Question and answer sessions, educational lectures by prominent orators such as Eugene V. Debs, Walter Thomas Mills, and Kate Richards O'Hare, singing and instrumental music, and discussions around the campfire marked these Socialist encampments. In the process converts to the socialist cause made and the spirit of believers fortified. In 1915, over 100 encampments were held, with the largest hosting up to 10,000 participants.

=== Decline ===
Threats of violence against Socialists began in Oklahoma in 1916. The drive towards American intervention in Mexico against Pancho Villa inflamed patriotic sentiments throughout the Southwest, causing an anti-Socialist editor to opine of one local Socialist of purportedly pro-Mexican sympathies that "such a man does not deserve the protection of the American government" and hint broadly of a popular desire for a lynching rope. A Socialist newspaper editor was driven from his home after stating a desire that any American who invaded Mexico should be buried there.

The editor of the Marshall County News-Democrat threw more gasoline on the fire, condemning the Socialist opposition as "lying reprobates and degenerate libertines" who should "all be driven from the American continent."

With American entry into World War I, the rhetoric and the stakes were raised yet again, with the Democratic state government of Oklahoma establishing a state-level organization to promote the aims and policies of the national military effort, the Oklahoma Council of Defense. This group of wealthy citizens and community leaders launched a coordinated campaign against the "dangerous" internationalist and pacifist ideas of the Socialist movement. Local councils committed acts of violence against dissidents, including the use of tar and feathers, application of yellow paint, and flogging.

=== The Green Corn Rebellion ===
The Socialist Party opposed World War I, and came under fierce attacks for being unpatriotic. Oklahoma suffered from widespread Germanophobia, which saw the cities of Kiel, Bismark, and Korn were renamed Loyal, Wright, and Corn, respectively.

In late 1917, the leadership of the Oklahoma Socialist Party disbanded the state party, in the tumultuous aftermath of the failed Green Corn Rebellion, for which Socialists and Wobblies were blamed. However, this decision was contested by many rank and file as being illegal under party rules.

=== Reorganization of 1928 ===
Throughout the 1920s the Socialist Party of Oklahoma, formerly one of the strongest state divisions of the SPA, virtually vanished from the political landscape. Only a small handful of at large members remained on the party's membership rolls, with all locals and the state organization discontinued. In February 1928 effort on the part of the SPA's National Office in Chicago began to be exerted to reestablish the Socialist Party of Oklahoma, with the state's at large members reached via mail with a view to the calling of a state conference in Oklahoma City prior to the party's national convention late in the spring.

Around March 1, 1928 a formal call was issued for a reorganizational convention of the Socialist Party of Oklahoma, with a view to nomination of a full party ticket for the November elections in the state. The gathering, held in Musicians Hall in Oklahoma City, was freely delegated and open to "all party members and all those who expect to join before the date of the convention, or even at the beginning of the convention." Socialist Party observers optimistically predicted the rapid growth of the new Socialist Party of Oklahoma as soon as the reorganization had taken place.

The reorganizational convention was attended by 40 delegates from around the state. National Secretary of the Socialist Party William H. Henry was named chairman of the convention and Oklahoma Socialist Party veteran Freda Hogan was elected secretary. The gathering elected a new 7-member State Committee and chose Myrtle Blackwell of Oklahoma City as the temporary State Secretary until such time that a permanent State Secretary could be elected. Two delegates were elected to the forthcoming 1928 National Convention on behalf of the newly reorganized Oklahoma state party.

== Prominent members ==
- Freda Ameringer
- Oscar Ameringer
- Otto Branstetter
- Winnie Branstetter
- Ida Hayman Callery
- J. Tad Crumbie
- R.E. Dooley
- Orville E. Enfield
- Sydney W. Hill
- Charles Henry Ingham
- David C. Kirkpatrick
- Jeane Kirkpatrick
- Thomas Henry McLemore
- Patrick S. Nagle
- Frank P. O'Hare
- Kate Richards O'Hare
- N. D. Pritchett
- H.H. Stallard
- Thomas W. Woodrow
- G. E. Wilson

== Socialist and radical newspapers published in Oklahoma ==
| Publication | Town | County | Dates Published |
|---|---|---|---|
| The Agitator | Sayre | Beckham | 1913–191? |
| Beckham County Advocate | Carter | Beckham | |
| Berlin Herald | Berlin | Roger Mills | |
| Boswell Submarine | Boswell | Choctaw | 1912–1915 |
| The Bugle | Oklahoma City | Oklahoma | April 1922- Jan. 1924 |
| Cleo Chieftain | Cleo Springs | Major | 1895–1942 |
| Durant Independent Farmer | Durant | Bryan | |
| Ellis County Socialist | Shattuck | Ellis | 1914–1917 |
| Farmers' Union Advocate | Ardmore | Carter | 1908–1909 |
| Grant County Socialist | Medford | Grant | 1912–191? |
| Hammon Advocate | Hammon | Roger Mills | 1911–1969 |
| Indiahoma Union Signal | Shawnee | Pottawatomie | 1905–190? |
| Industrial Democrat | Oklahoma City | Oklahoma | Jan.–Nov. 1910 |
| Johnston County Socialist | Tishomingo | Johnston | 191?–191? |
| Kay County Populist | Newkirk | Kay | 189?–190? |
| Kiowa Breeze | | Kiowa | 1901–190? |
| Madill Socialist-Herald | Madill | Marshall | 1911–1912 |
| Musings of the Old Cuss | Sayre | Beckham | |
| New Century | Sulphur | Murray | Jan. 1911–June 1913 |
| Newkirk Populist | Newkirk | Kay | 1894–189? |
| Oklahoma Leader | Oklahoma City | Oklahoma | May 1918–Feb. 1928 |
| Oklahoma Pioneer | Oklahoma City | Oklahoma | Jan. 1910–March 1913 |
| Oklahoma Socialist | Newkirk | Kay | |
| Otter Valley Socialist | Snyder | Kiowa | Jan. 1915–May 1918 |
| Roger Mills Sentinel | Cheyenne | Roger Mills | |
| Sayre Citizen | Sayre | Beckham | |
| Sayre Social Democrat | Sayre | Beckham | Feb.–May 1912 |
| Sentinel Sword of Truth | Sentinel | Washita | |
| Sledge Hammer | Okemah | Okfuskee | June 1913–Oct. 1914 |
| Social Democrat | Oklahoma City | Oklahoma | Jan. 1913–Jan. 1914 |
| Socialist Herald | Madill | Marshall | |
| Strong City Herald | Strong City | Roger Mills | 1914–1918 |
| Taloga Times | Taloga | Dewey | |
| Tenant Farmer | Kingfisher | Kingfisher | |
| Union Review | Ardmore | Carter | |
| Woodrow's Monthly | Hobart | Kiowa | |
| Woods County Constructive Socialist | Alva | Woods | |

Sources: Jim Bissett, Agrarian Socialism in America, pp. 242–243; Burbank, When Farmers Voted Red, pp. 210-211.

== SPO average paid memberships ==
| Year | Average Paid Membership | Exempt Members | National SPA Membership |
|---|---|---|---|
| 1901 | | n/a | 4,759 paid (of 7,629) |
| 1902 | 75 | n/a | 9,949 |
| 1903 | | n/a | 15,975 |
| 1904 | 145 | n/a | 20,763 |
| 1905 | 505 | n/a | 23,327 |
| 1906 | 1,031 | n/a | 26,784 |
| 1907 | 1,542 | n/a | 29,270 |
| 1908 | 2,243 | n/a | 41,751 |
| 1909 | 1,858 | n/a | 41,470 |
| 1910 | 5,842 | n/a | 58,011 |
| 1911 | 4,067 | n/a | 84,716 |
| 1912 | | n/a | 118,045 |
| 1913 | | | 95,957 |
| 1914 | | | 93,579 |
| 1915 | | | 79,374 |
| 1916 | 9,369 | | 83,284 |
| 1917 | 3,303 | | 80,379 |
| 1918 | 3,840 (first 6 mos.) | | 82,344 |
| 1919 | | | 104,822 |
| 1920 | | | 26,766 |
| 1921 | | | 13,484 |
| 1922 | | | 11,019 |
| 1923 | | | 10,662 |
| 1924 | | | 10,125 |
| 1925 | | | 8,558 |
| 1926 | | | 8,392 |
| 1927 | | | 7,425 |
| 1928 | | | 7,793 |
| 1929 | | | 9,560 |
| 1930 | | | 9,736 |
| 1931 | | | 10,389 |
| 1932 | | | 16,863 |
| 1933 | | | 18,548 |
| 1934 | | | 20,951 |
| 1935 | | | 19,121 |
| 1936 | | | 11,922 |

Sources: Carl D. Thompson, "The Rising Tide of Socialism," The Socialist (Columbus, OH), Aug. 12, 1911, pg. 2; St. Louis Labor, Feb. 22, 1902, pg. 5; "Dues Paid Last Year," The Worker, March 22, 1903, pg. 4; Socialist Party Official Bulletin and successors, Executive Secretary state-by-state membership summaries, January issues; 1909 figure from Socialist Party Official Bulletin, April 1910, pg. 4;"Socialist Party Official Membership Series", (1932). Report to 1937 Convention, cited in "Socialist Party of America Annual Membership Figures," Early American Marxism website. "Exempt" members denote those receiving special dispensation from the state office due to unemployment starting 1913. Adoloph Germer, Report of Executive Secretary to the National Executive Committee: Chicago, Illinois — Aug. 8, 1918, pp. 5-6.

== See also ==
- Socialist Party of Missouri
- Socialist Party of North Dakota
- Socialist Party of Oregon
- Socialist Party of Washington
- Social-Democratic Party of Wisconsin

== Works cited ==
- Foner, Philip (1977). American Socialism and Black Americans: From The Age of Jackson to World War II. Greenwood Publishing Group. ISBN 0837195454.
