= Whit M. Grant =

15th mayor of Oklahoma City (1851–1927)

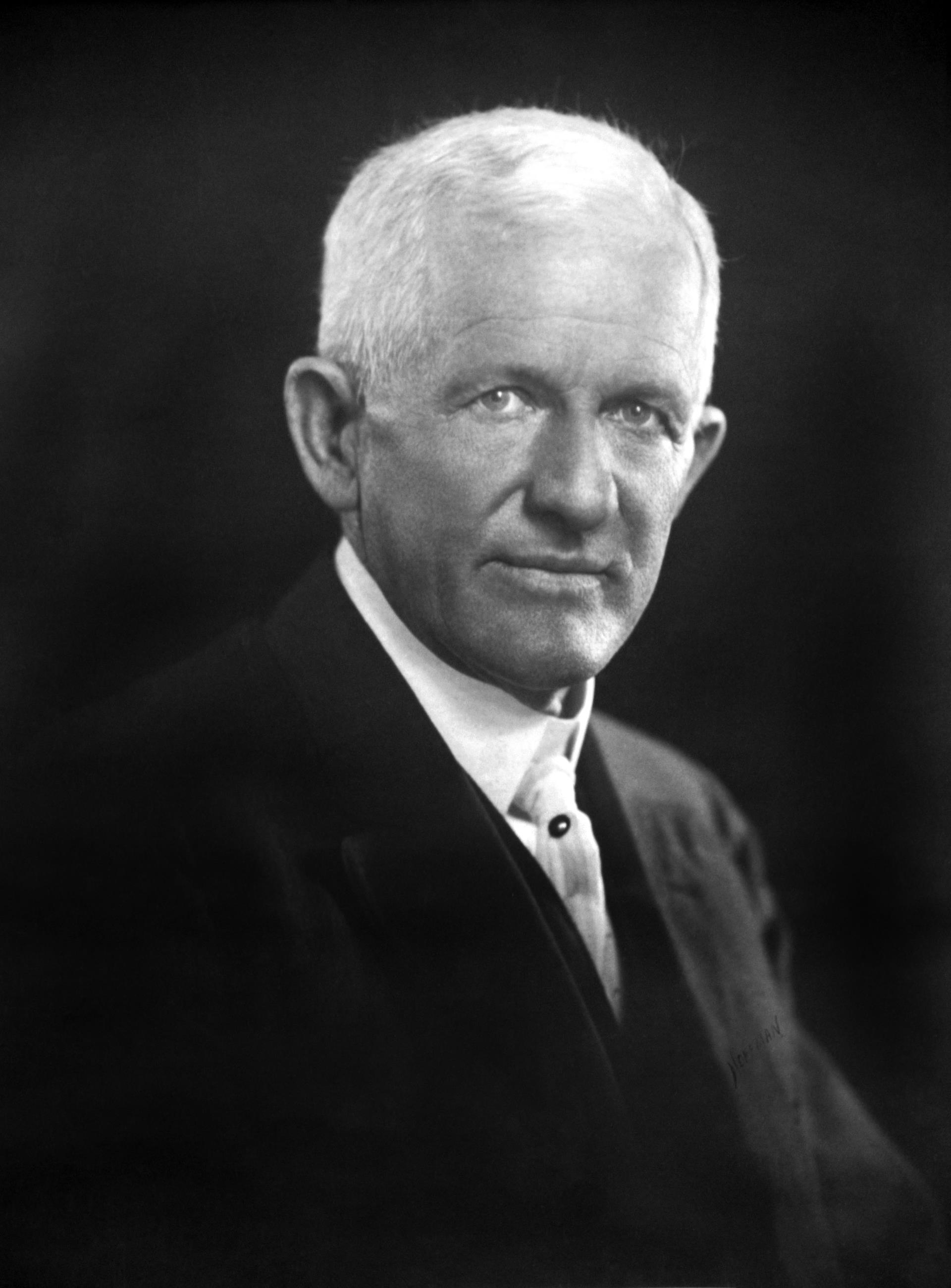

16th Mayor of Oklahoma City
- In office June 8, 1911 – April 13, 1915
- Preceded by: Dan V. Lackey
- Succeeded by: Ed Overholser

Personal details
- Born: Whitaker McDonough Grant; April 26, 1851 Alabama, U.S.
- Died: December 10, 1927 (aged 76)
- Party: Democratic Party

Whit M. Grant was an American politician who served as the 15th Mayor of Oklahoma City between June 8, 1911, and April 13, 1915.

== Biography ==
Whitaker McDonough Grant was born on April 26, 1851, in Alabama. He lived in Iowa and Alaska before settling in Oklahoma City where he practiced law. He was elected as a Democrat in the 1911 Oklahoma City mayoral election, defeating J.F. Warren and Oscar Ameringer. He served as mayor of Oklahoma City from June 8, 1911, to April 13, 1915. During his first term his wife Katie died of a stroke. Grant campaigned on cracking down on crime, but failed to combat illegal gambling and bootlegging. Two recall petitions filed against him failed during his tenure. He died on December 10, 1927.

== Electoral history ==
Oklahoma City mayoral election, 1911
Party	Candidate	Votes	%
Democratic	Whit M. Grant	3,438	41.6
Republican	J. F. Warren	2,946	35.7
Socialist	Oscar Ameringer	1,876	22.7
Total votes		8,260	100.00
