= Charles Henry Ingham =

American politician

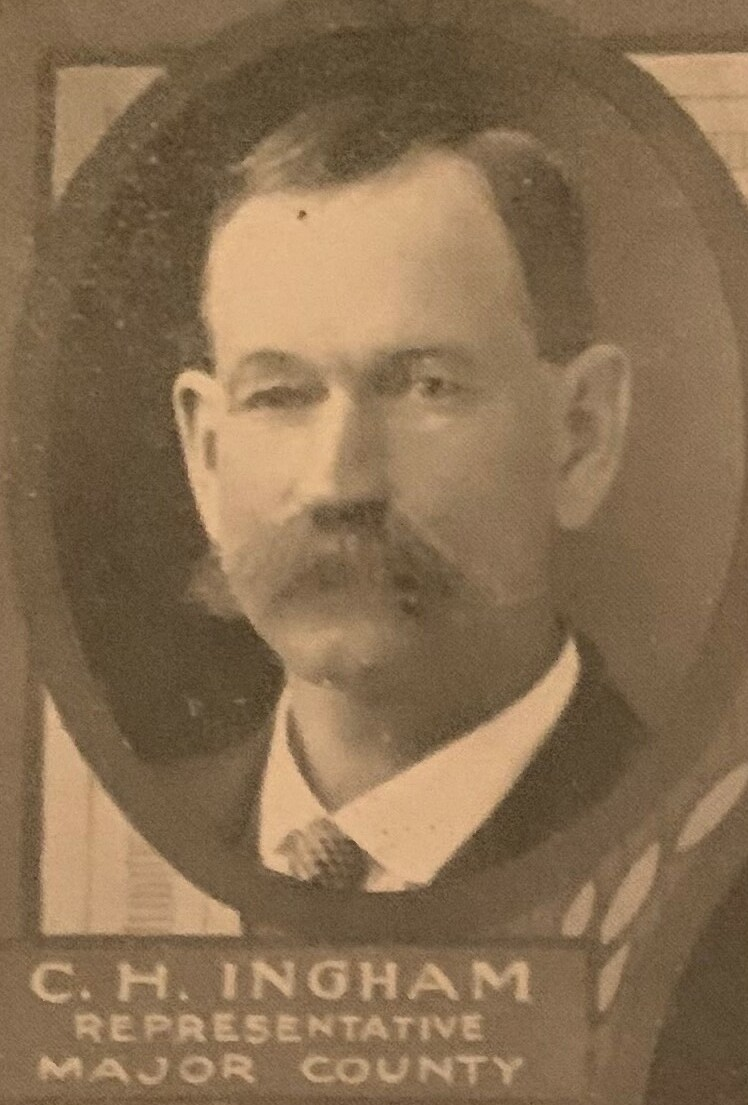

Member of the Oklahoma House of Representatives from the Major County district
- In office 1914–1916

Personal details
- Died: January 30, 1950
- Resting place: Forrest Cemetery; Ringwood, Oklahoma
- Political party: Socialist

Charles Henry Ingham was an American politician who served as a Socialist member of the Oklahoma House of Representatives representing Major County between 1914 and 1916. He was one of the first third party candidates elected to the Oklahoma House of Representatives alongside fellow Socialist Party Representatives David C. Kirkpatrick, N. D. Pritchett, Thomas Henry McLemore, and Sydney W. Hill.

== Political career ==
Ingham was elected to the Oklahoma House of Representatives in 1914 as a Socialist. After losing re-election in 1916, he ran for his former seat again in 1918 and won the Socialist primary, but withdrew and was replaced with another candidate for the general election. He ran again for the seat in 1920.

== Death ==
Ingham died on January 30, 1950, and is buried in Forrest Cemetery in Ringwood, Oklahoma.
