= The American Guardian =

American newspaper (1931–1942)

- Type: Weekly newspaper
- Founder: Oscar Ameringer
- Editor: Oscar Ameringer
- Founded: April 23, 1931
- Ceased publication: January 1, 1942
- Political alignment: Socialist
- Language: English
- Headquarters: Oklahoma City, Oklahoma
- Country: United States of America

The American Guardian was a newspaper published in Oklahoma City, Oklahoma, between 1931 and 1942. It succeeded The Oklahoma Weekly Leader. The American Guardian came out weekly from its start on April 23, 1931, to October 10, 1941. Then it was published on a bimonthly basis until its closure on January 1, 1942. The editor of The American Guardian was Oscar Ameringer. The paper had a socialist political stance.
