= Henry Scales =

Mayor of Oklahoma City (1861–1926)

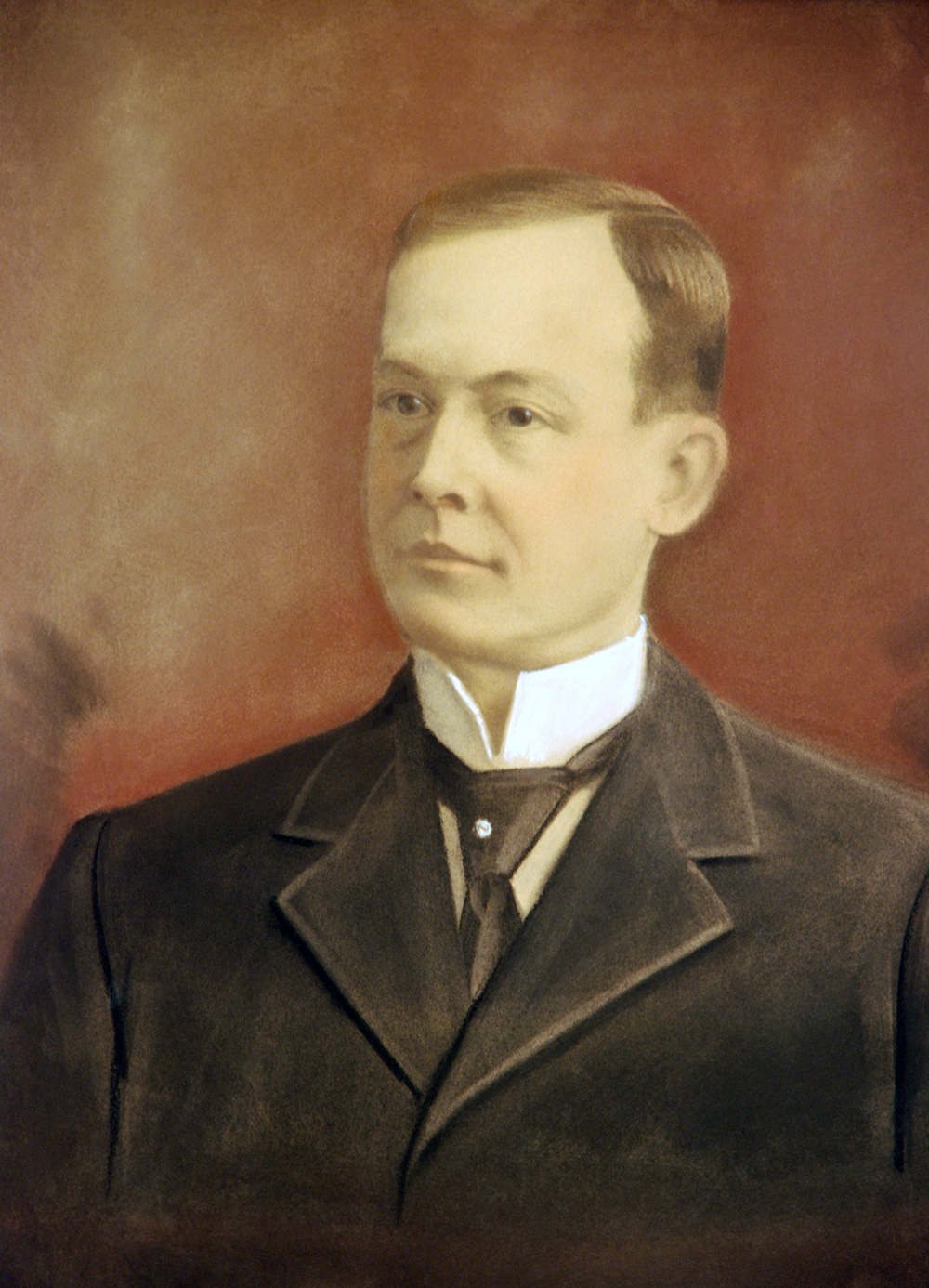
- Scales in 1910.

14th Mayor of Oklahoma City
- In office April 8, 1907 – October 18, 1910
- Preceded by: Joseph Fife Messenbaugh
- Succeeded by: Dan V. Lackey

Personal details
- Born: March 13, 1869 Holly Springs, Mississippi, U.S.
- Died: December 15, 1918 (aged 49)
- Education: Vanderbilt University; Johns Hopkins University

Henry Minor Scales was an American politician who served as the Mayor of Oklahoma City when the U.S. state of Oklahoma was admitted to the United States. He was in office between 1907 and 1910.

== Early life ==
Henry Minor Scales was born on March 13, 1869, in Holly Springs, Mississippi. He graduated from Vanderbilt University and Johns Hopkins University and settled in Oklahoma City in 1903.

== Mayor of Oklahoma City ==
He was elected Mayor of Oklahoma City in 1907 and focused on fighting gambling and enforcing prohibition during his first term. His second term he and the Oklahoma City Council were investigated for corruption, but Scales was not charged. He declared the first and second Oklahoma State Fairs city holidays. He took office April 8, 1907, and resigned on October 18, 1910, during his second term.

== Death ==
He died on December 15, 1918.
