= 1911 Oklahoma City mayoral election =

← 1907	May 9, 1911	1915 →
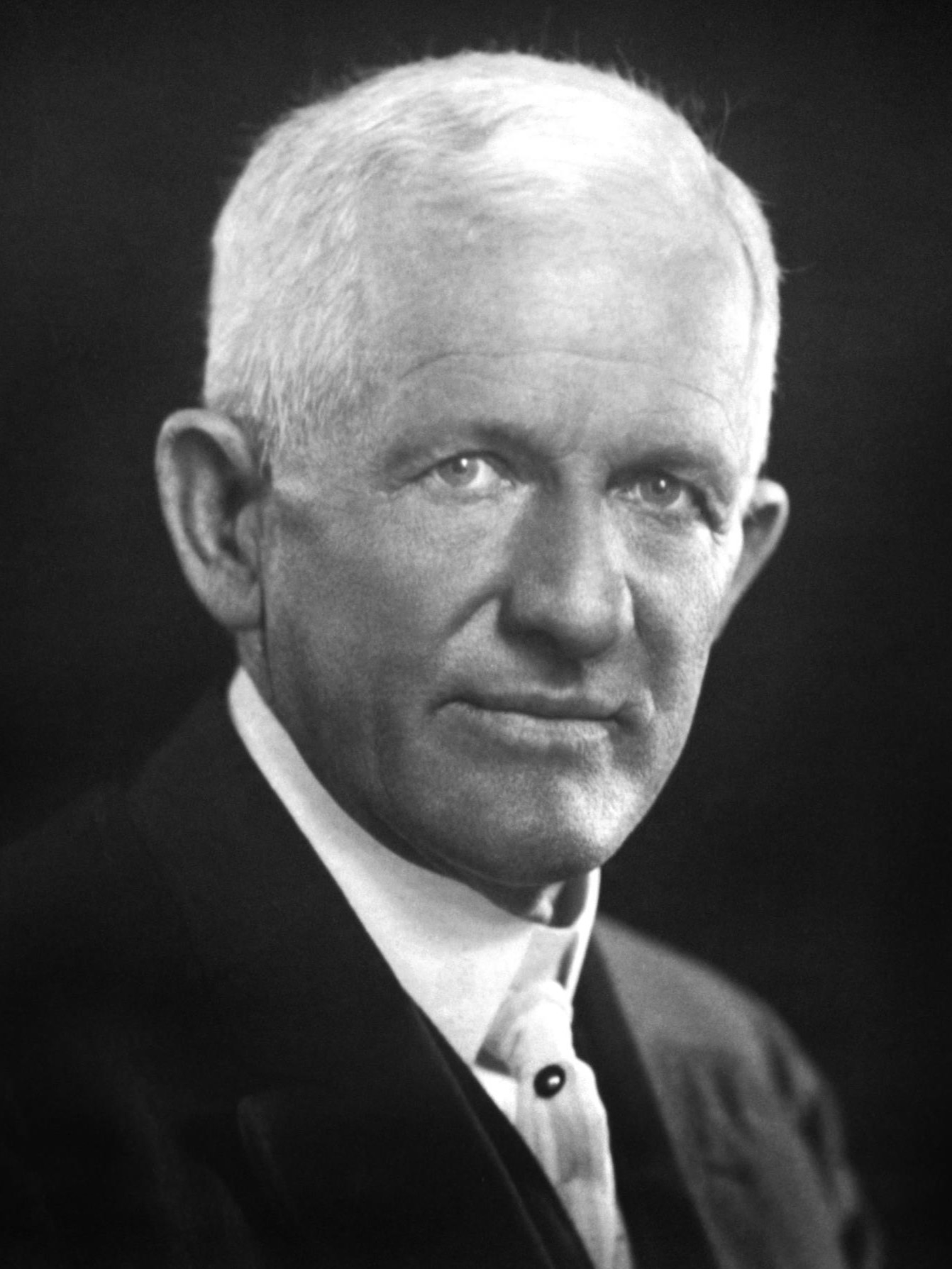

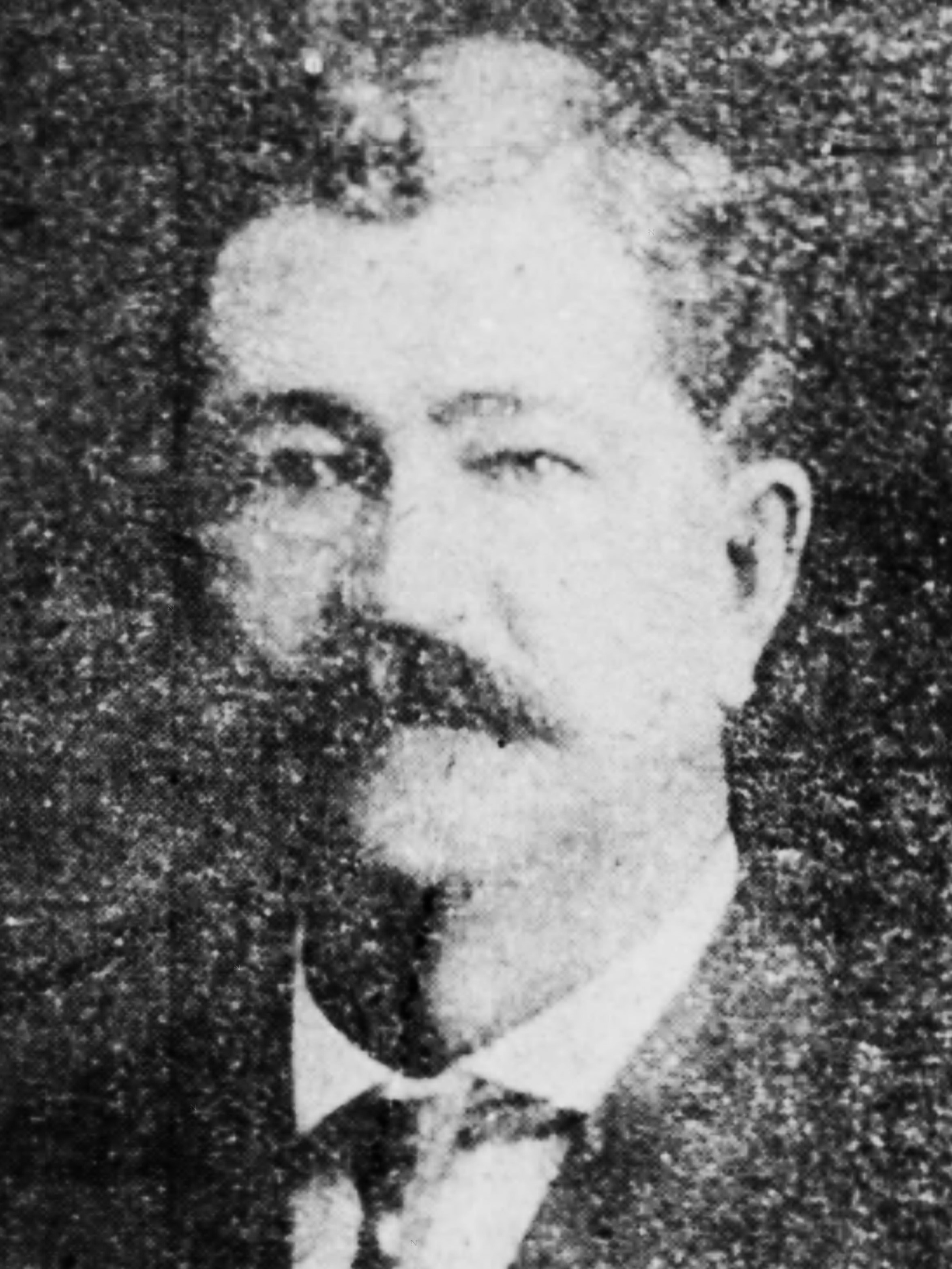

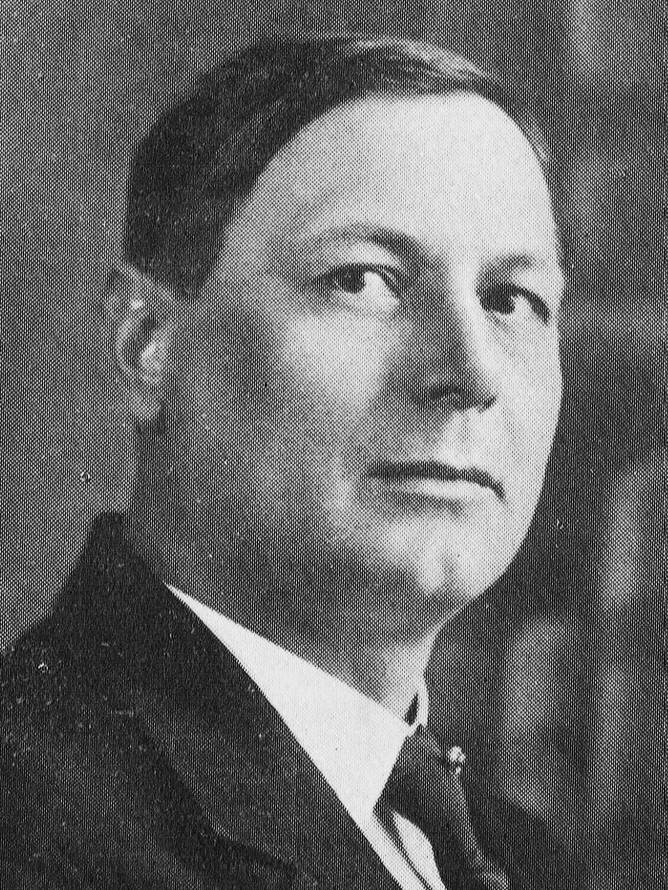
Nominee	Whit M. Grant	J. F. Warren	Oscar Ameringer
Party	Democratic	Republican	Socialist
Popular vote	3,438	2,946	1,876
Percentage	41.6%	35.7%	22.7%
Mayor before election
Dan V. Lackey
Elected mayor
Whit M. Grant
Democratic

An election for Mayor of Oklahoma City was held on May 9, 1911. Whit M. Grant was elected with 41% of the vote. He was sworn in on June 8, 1911.

Candidates included attorney and businessman Whit M. Grant, businessman J. F. Warren, and socialist author and organizer Oscar Ameringer.

== Results ==
Oklahoma City mayoral election, 1911
Party	Candidate	Votes	%
Democratic	Whit M. Grant	3,438	41.6
Republican	J. F. Warren	2,946	35.7
Socialist	Oscar Ameringer	1,876	22.7
Total votes		8,260	100.00
