= Thomas Henry McLemore =

American politician (died 1947)

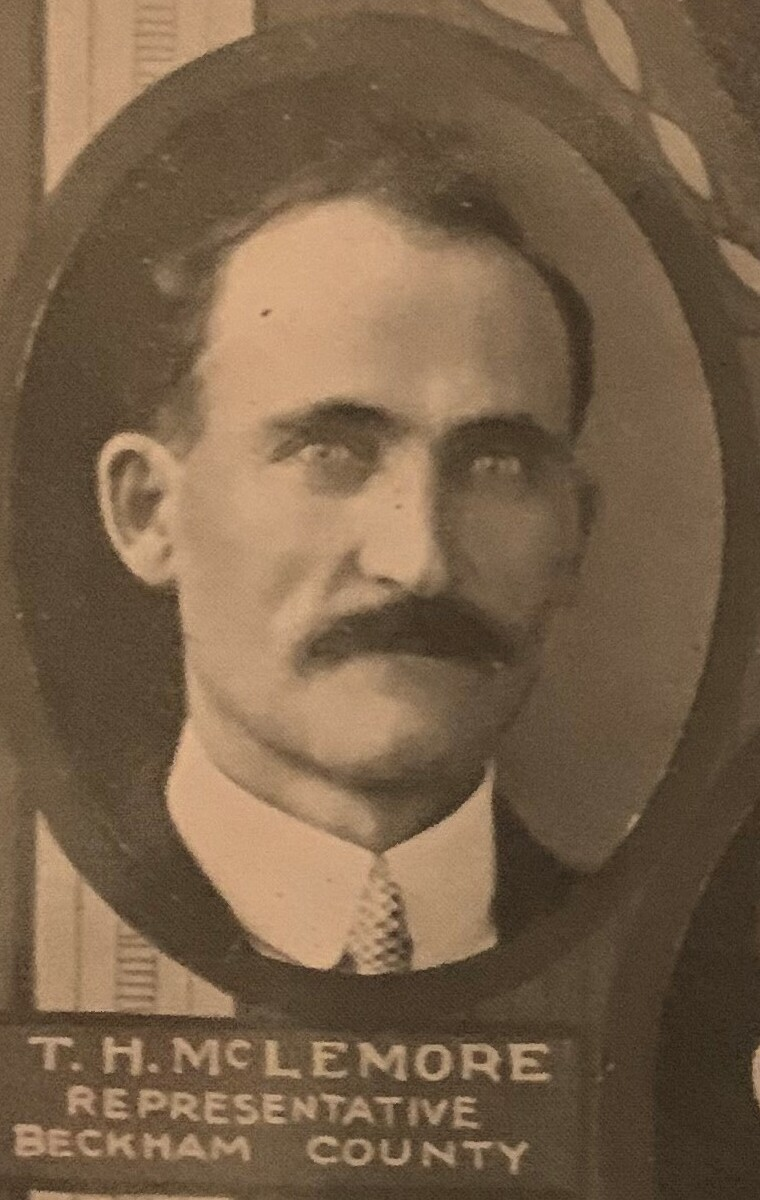

Member of the Oklahoma House of Representatives from the Beckham County, Oklahoma district
- In office 1914–1916

Personal details
- Died: June 28, 1947 Beckham County, USA
- Resting place: Fairlawn Cemetery; Elk City, Oklahoma
- Party: Socialist (1914-1918); Farmer-Labor (1924); Democratic (1928-1930, 1934-1938); Independent (1932)

Thomas Henry McLemore was an American politician who served as a Socialist member of the Oklahoma House of Representatives representing Beckham County between 1914 and 1916. He was one of the first third party candidates elected to the Oklahoma House of Representatives alongside fellow Socialist Party Representatives David C. Kirkpatrick, N. D. Pritchett, Charles Henry Ingham, and Sydney W. Hill.

== Political career ==
McLemore was born in Texas and he moved to Elk City, Oklahoma Territory in 1904 or 1905. He was known as a Campbellite and prohibitionist. He ran unopposed in the 1914 Beckham County state house Socialist primary receiving 368 votes. He was elected to the Oklahoma House of Representatives as a Socialist in 1914 with 1,100 votes. Democratic nominee H. V. Joseph received 1,020 votes and Republican nominee Marvin Fuchs received 566 votes. After McLemore lost re-election in 1916, he was the Socialist nominee for president of the Oklahoma Board of Agriculture in 1918. He later joined the Farmer-Labor Party and was their nominee for an Oklahoma Senate district in 1924, before registering as a Democrat in 1928. After switching to the Democratic Party, he ran for his old legislative seat in 1928, 1930, 1934, and 1938. He also ran an unsuccessful race for Congress in 1932 as an independent.

== Later years and death ==
McLemore later wrote a book on the Great Depression. He died in Beckham County on June 28, 1947, at 72 years old, and is buried in Fairlawn Cemetery in Elk City.
