= David C. Kirkpatrick =

American politician

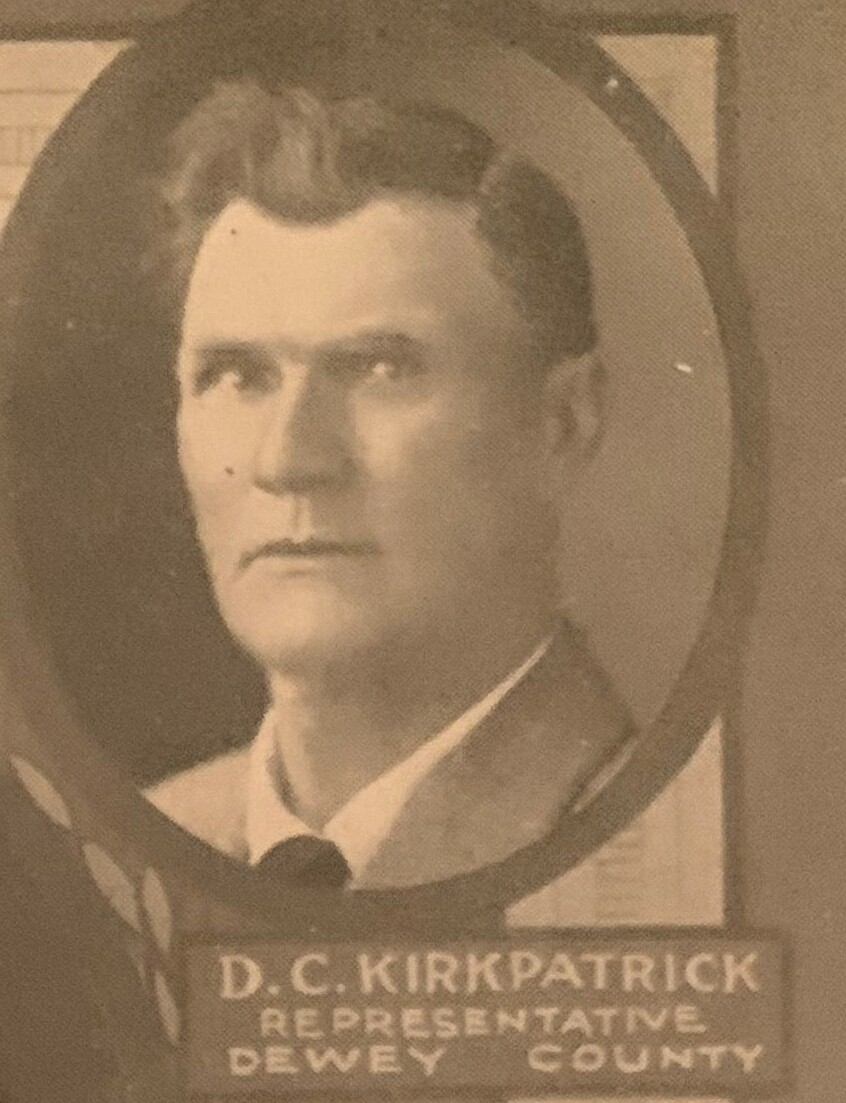

Member of the Oklahoma House of Representatives from the Dewey County district
- In office 1914–1916

Personal details
- Died: November 7, 1941
- Resting place: Brumfield Cemetery; Seiling, Oklahoma
- Political party: Socialist (until 1924); Farmer-Labor Party (after 1924)

David C. Kirkpatrick was an American politician who served as a Socialist member of the Oklahoma House of Representatives representing Dewey County between 1914 and 1916. He was one of the first third party candidates elected to the Oklahoma House of Representatives alongside fellow Socialist Party Representatives Thomas Henry McLemore, N. D. Pritchett, Charles Henry Ingham, and Sydney W. Hill.

== Political career ==
Kirkpatrick was elected to the Oklahoma House of Representatives in 1914 as a Socialist. After losing re-election in 1916, Kirkpatrick ran as the Socialist nominee for an Oklahoma Senate district. He later ran for an Oklahoma House of Representatives seat in Dewey County under the Farmer-Labor Party in 1924.

== Death ==
Kirkpatrick died on November 7, 1941, at the age of 89, and he is buried in Brumfield Cemetery in Seiling, Oklahoma.
