= N. D. Pritchett =

American politician and newspaper editor in the early 20th century

Neal Dow Pritchett
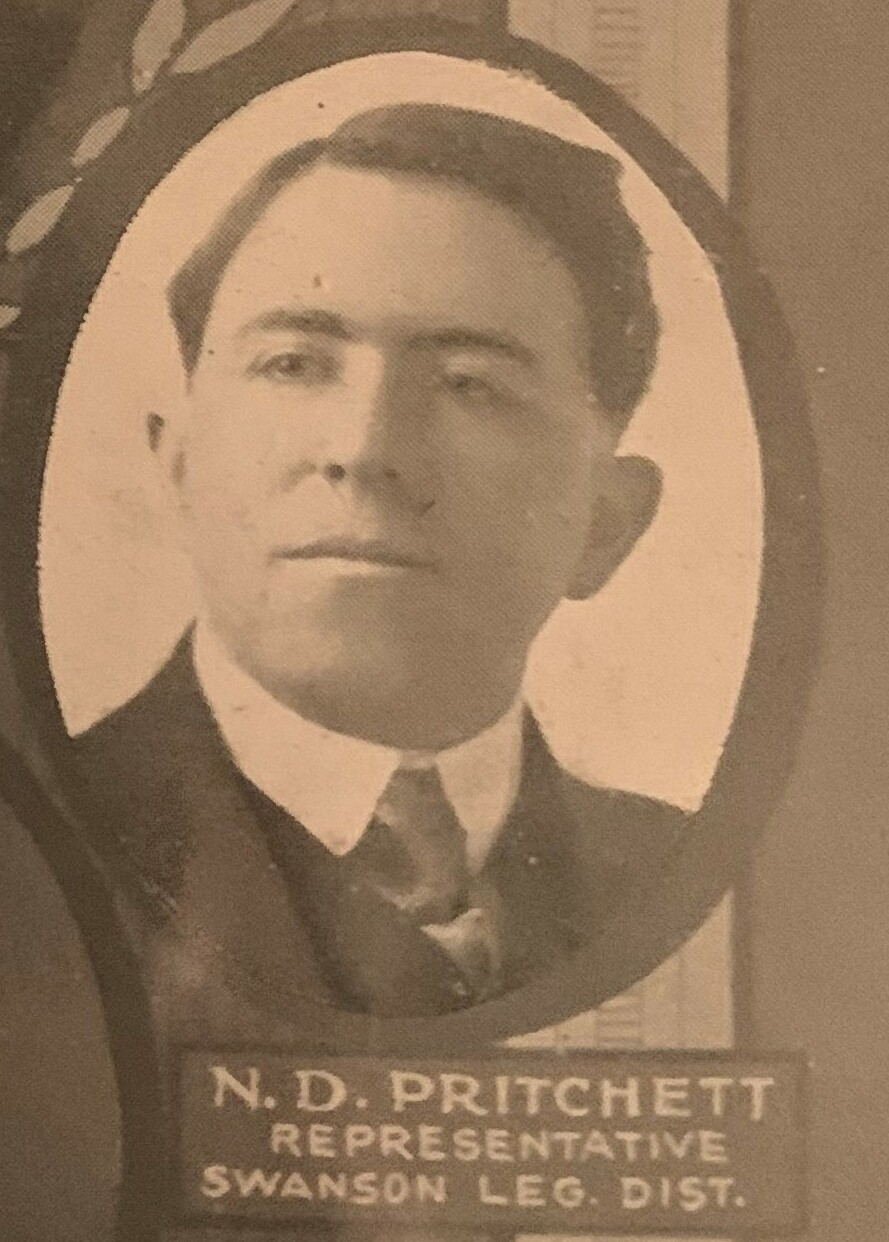

Member of the Oklahoma House of Representatives from the Kiowa County district
- In office 1914–1916

Personal details
- Political party: Socialist

Neal Dow Pritchett was an American politician and newspaper editor who served as a Socialist member of the Oklahoma House of Representatives representing Kiowa County between 1914 and 1916. He was one of the first third party candidates elected to the Oklahoma House of Representatives alongside fellow Socialist Party Representatives David C. Kirkpatrick, Thomas Henry McLemore, Charles Henry Ingham, and Sydney W. Hill, and the first third party nominee for Speaker of the Oklahoma House of Representatives.

== Political career ==
In 1913, Pritchett was the Secretary for the Snyder, Oklahoma local of the Socialist Party of Oklahoma. Pritchett ran for the Oklahoma House of Representatives as the Socialist Party's nominee in 1914. After winning the election, he was the first third party nominee for Speaker of the Oklahoma House of Representatives. During the 5th Oklahoma Legislature's special session, he wrote multiple columns for the Otter Valley Socialist proposing usury limits and supported various attempts at reform, but did not vote for that sessions final usury reform bill which increased the maximum interest rate to 15% on loans over $100.

In 1916 he ran unopposed in the Socialist Party primary. In June 1916, he became an associate editor for the Otter Valley Socialist. On October 19, 1916, during his reelection campaign, the Otter Valley Socialist accused Democratic politician Guy Parham of committing adultery in the Philippines and abandoning his wife and children. Parham, who was an associate editor of The Socialist Antidote, filed a complaint of criminal libel against Pritchett and the paper's editor V.L. Rhodyback. On October 23, the pair were arrested on the charges and held for $500 bond. Their bond was paid that day. Pritchett went on to lose the election to the Democratic candidate.

== Later life ==
After losing his re-election campaign in 1916, Pritchett filed for divorce in April 1917. The divorce was granted without contest on August 25, 1917. He resigned as associate editor of the Otter Valley Socialist in September of that year and left Oklahoma. The criminal libel case against him filed by Parham was later dismissed in August 1918. He registered for the World War I draft on September 12, 1918 in Brawley, California where he had remarried and started working as a railroad telegrapher. He sold his land in Oklahoma in July 1923 and in 1926 he disappeared from Brawley.

== Personal life and family ==
Pritchett's first wife, Eva Arnold, bought a photography business in 1912 which reopened in Snyder, Oklahoma the following year. She was also the superintendent of the local Sunday school.
