= Sydney W. Hill =

American politician

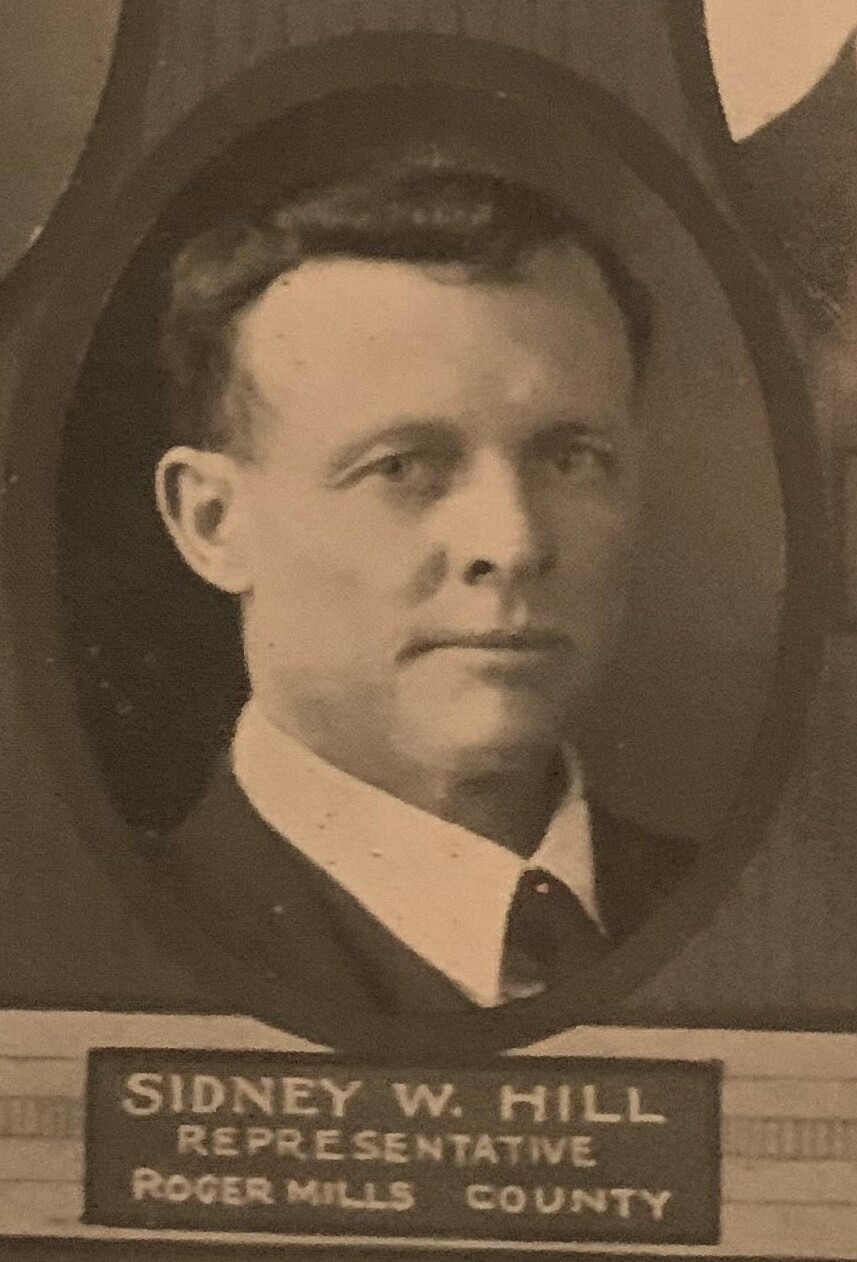

Member of the Oklahoma House of Representatives from the Roger Mills County district
- In office 1914–1916

Personal details
- Died: November 25, 1958
- Resting place: Silent Home Cemetery; Roll, Oklahoma
- Political party: Socialist (Until 1930); Democratic (After 1930)

Sydney W. Hill was an American politician who served as a Socialist member of the Oklahoma House of Representatives representing Roger Mills County between 1914 and 1916. He was one of the first third party candidates elected to the Oklahoma House of Representatives alongside fellow Socialist Party Representatives David C. Kirkpatrick, N. D. Pritchett, Charles Henry Ingham, and Thomas Henry McLemore.

He later ran for his former seat in the 1930 and 1940 elections as a Democrat. He later died on November 25, 1958, at the age of 85, and was buried at Silent Home Cemetery in Roll, Oklahoma.
