= Dan V. Lackey =

American urban developer and politician

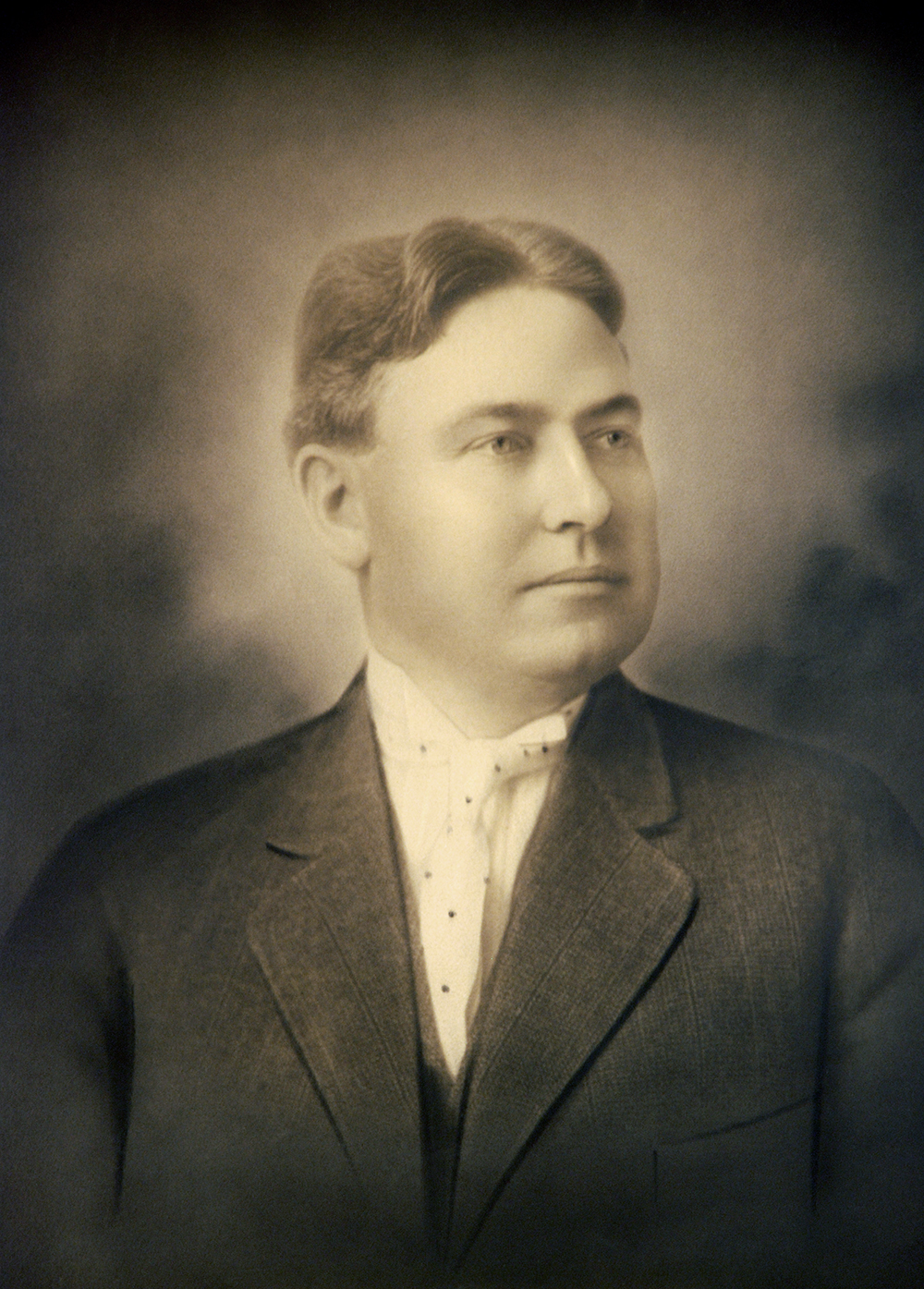
- Lackey in 1911.

15th Mayor of Oklahoma City
- In office October 18, 1910 – June 8, 1911
- Preceded by: Henry Scales
- Succeeded by: Whit M. Grant

Oklahoma City Councilor
- In office 1908–1910

Personal details
- Born: November 2, 1877 Lawrence County, Illinois, U.S.
- Died: January 14, 1959 (aged 81) Tulsa, Oklahoma, U.S.

Daniel Vorhes Lackey was an American politician who served as the Mayor of Oklahoma City between 1910 and 1911.

== Biography ==
Daniel Vorhes Lackey was born in Lawrence County, Illinois, on November 2, 1877. He served on the Oklahoma City Council from 1908 to 1910, when he was appointed Mayor of Oklahoma City when Henry Scales resigned. He campaigned alongside other city officials to make Oklahoma City the capital of Oklahoma in the 1910 Oklahoma elections. He served between October 18, 1910, and June 8, 1911. During World War II he moved to Abilene, Texas. He later moved to Tulsa and died on January 14, 1959.
