= Little Rock City Hall =

- U.S. National Register of Historic Places
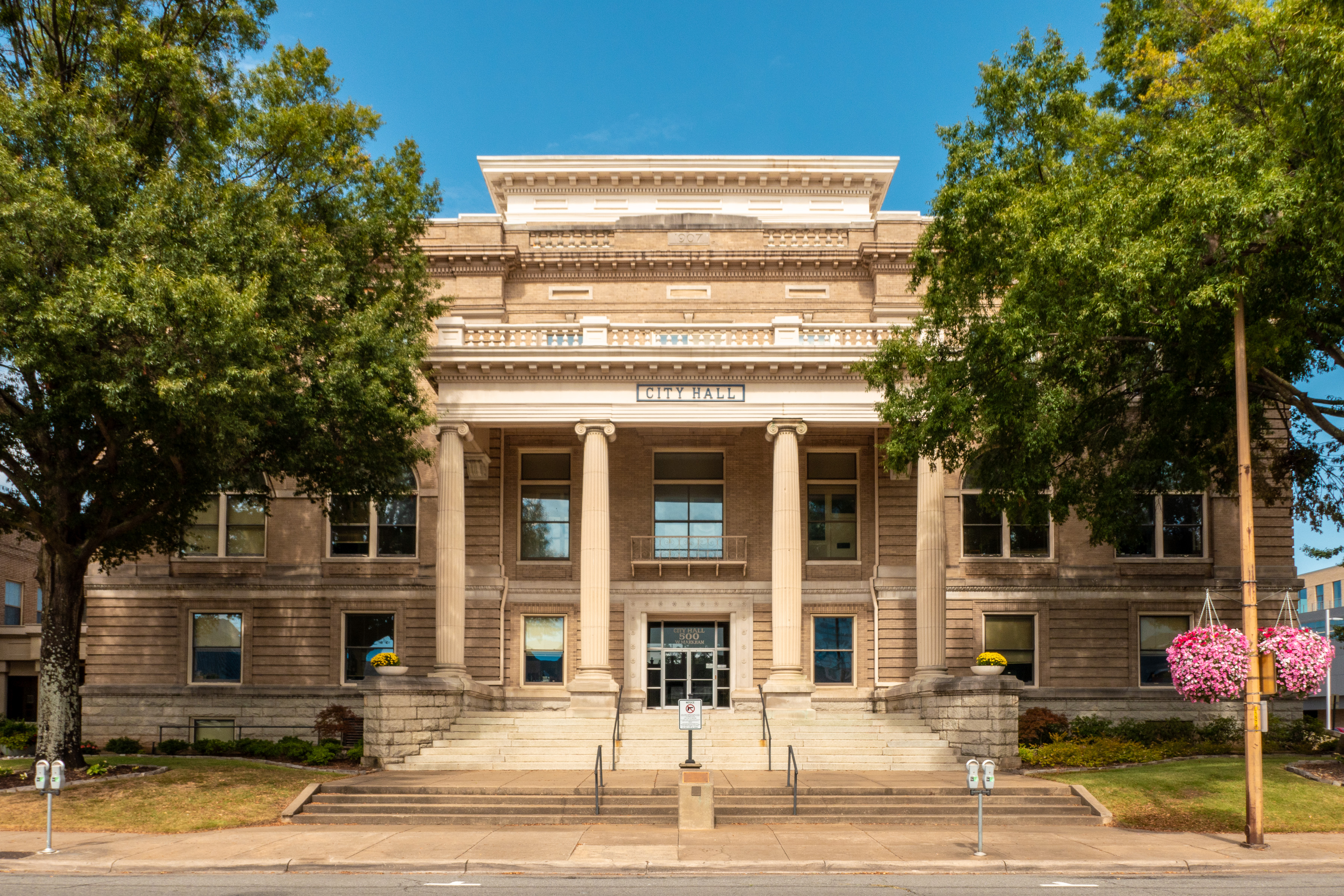
- City Hall in 2022

- Location within Arkansas Location within the United States
- Location: 500 W. Markham St., Little Rock, Arkansas
- Coordinates: 34°44′57″N 92°16′31″W
- Area: less than one acre
- Built: 1907
- Architect: Charles L. Thompson
- Architectural style: Renaissance
- NRHP reference No.: 79000452
- Added to NRHP: October 18, 1979

Little Rock City Hall, the seat of municipal government of the city of Little Rock, Arkansas, is located at 500 West Markham Street, in the city's downtown. It is a Renaissance Revival structure, designed by Arkansas architect Charles L. Thompson and built in 1907. Its main facade has a projecting Roman portico, supported by fluted Ionic columns, with flanking sections that have Roman-style round-arch openings. The building housed most of the city's departments until the 1950s.

The building was listed on the National Register of Historic Places in 1979.

== See also ==
- National Register of Historic Places listings in Little Rock, Arkansas
