= Oscar Ameringer =

German born American opinion journalist, joiner and musician

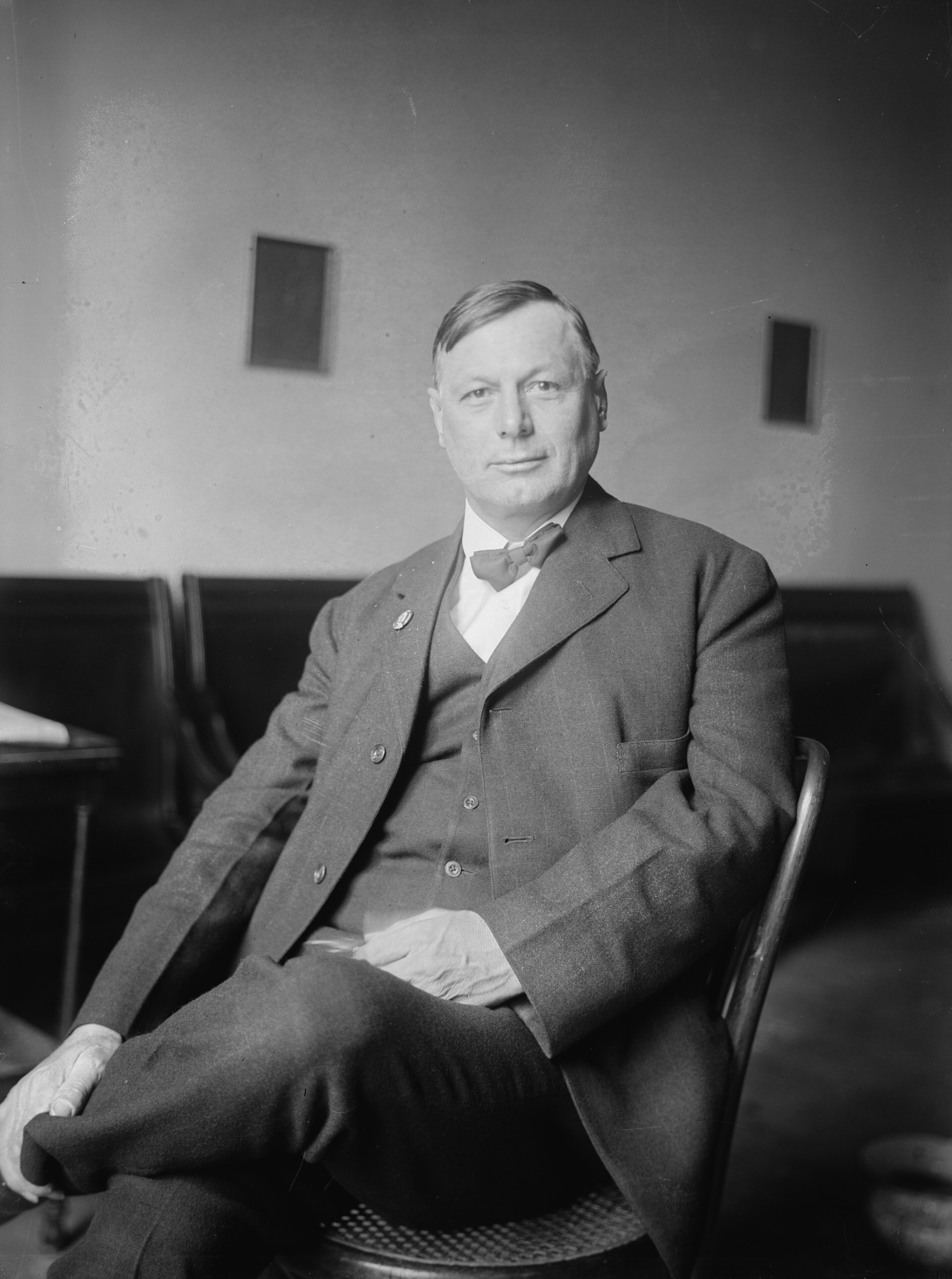
- Ameringer in 1920
- Born: August 4, 1870; Achstetten, Kingdom of Württemberg
- Died: November 5, 1943 (aged 73); Oklahoma City, Oklahoma, U.S.
- Occupations: Editor; Author; Political Organizer
- Known for: Editor, American Guardian; leader and organizer, Oklahoma Socialist Party
- Spouse: Freda Ameringer

Oscar Ameringer (August 4, 1870 – November 5, 1943) was a German-American Socialist editor, author, and organizer from the late 1890s until his death in 1943. Ameringer made a name for himself in the Socialist Party of Oklahoma as the editor of its newspaper and a prominent organizer for the party. His most famous work, The Life and Deeds of Uncle Sam, was a widely read satire of American history that sold over half a million copies and was translated into 15 languages. His wit as a speaker and writer and his reputation as being one of the grand old men of left-wing politics in the United States led to him being described as the "Mark Twain of American Socialism".

== Background ==
Oscar Ameringer was born in Achstetten, Germany in 1870. He came to America at the age of 15.

He taught himself English by reading library books, and went on to become a self-taught musician, portrait painter, writer, editor, political organizer, and standup-comedian who warmed up crowds for Eugene Debs and other socialist luminaries.

== Career ==
=== Ohio ===
His father, a cabinet maker, sent young Oscar to join his brother in Cincinnati, Ohio, where he tried his hand as a furniture maker and musician. He joined the Knights of Labor in 1886 and the American Federation of Musicians in 1903, but soon found his way into the newspaper industry working for a union newspaper in Columbus, Ohio. This paper, called the Labor World, introduced Ameringer to the labor struggles in the South, and he was soon on the front lines of a bitter labor dispute in New Orleans, Louisiana.

=== Oklahoma ===
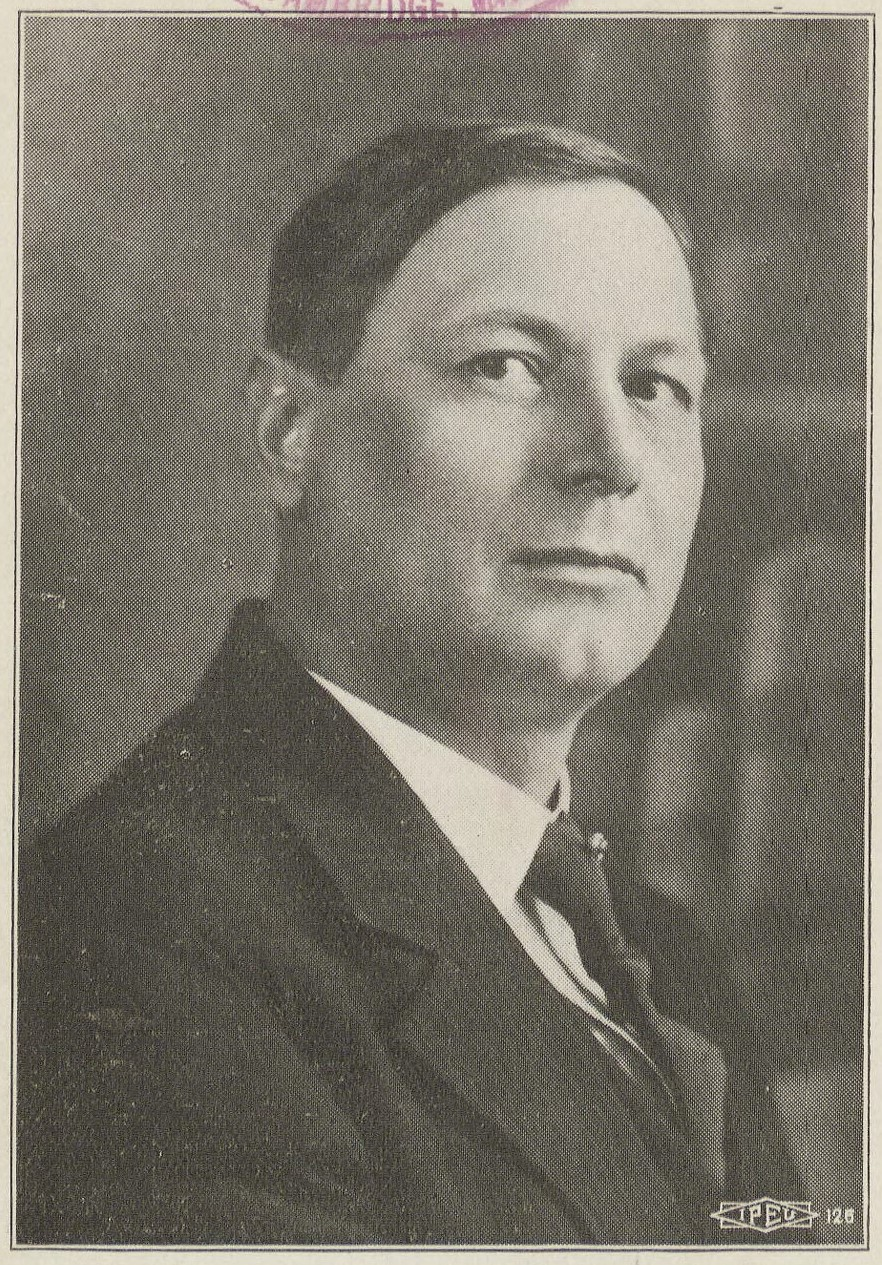
Ameringer in 1911.

After briefly organizing workers in Louisiana, Ameringer moved to Oklahoma to work for the Socialist Party. In Oklahoma, he was identified with the state party's social democratic "Yellow" faction, which supported replicating the centralized organizational model established by Victor L. Berger in Milwaukee, which was opposed by the more left-wing "Red" faction, which advocated greater decentralization. In spring of 1907, Ameringer started his first camp meeting tour of Oklahoma moving from town to town and relying on the hospitality of local farmers sympathetic to his cause. Although known for rousing speeches filled with humor and wit, Ameringer believed "something more than schoolhouse meeting, encampments and soap-box preaching was needed if the world was to be saved".

In 1909, Ameringer along with other Socialists formed the Industrial Democrat, but the paper's initial assignment covering a debate on a proposed amendment to weaken state power over corporations caused a fracture between Ameringer and the paper. He was fired from the editor position, only to move to the Socialist party's new paper, the Oklahoma Pioneer.

In 1911, Ameringer made a major push into politics running for mayor of Oklahoma City. He gathered twenty-three percent of the vote and "came within a few hundred votes of being elected". Of course, the noted humorist described his loss as "a narrow escape both for Oklahoma socialism and [himself]". In 1912, the Oklahoma Socialist Party voted to abolish the Oklahoma Pioneer as its official newspaper and a year later recalled Ameringer from his seat on the National Executive Committee as a result of a factional struggle within the party.

=== Wisconsin ===
By 1913, Ameringer had already moved to Milwaukee to serve as county organizer for the Socialist Party of Milwaukee County and work as a columnist and editor on their newspaper, the Milwaukee Leader. After another unsuccessful foray into politics in Wisconsin, in which his campaign was derailed by his arrest and indictment for obstruction of recruiting by the United States army, Ameringer decided to move again. He claims in his autobiography that "the idea behind the sensational arrests was to destroy [him and other Socialists] politically".

=== Oklahoma ===
After his Wisconsin years, Ameringer moved back down to Oklahoma to fight against a Ku Klux Klan candidate for governor and then to Illinois in 1920 where he edited the Illinois Miner, a publication aimed against UMWA president John L. Lewis. In 1931, Ameringer again returned to Oklahoma and founded what would be his last newspaper, The American Guardian.

The American Guardian continued in existence for a decade, finally being terminated early in 1941. The paper's subscriber list was assumed by the national liberal news weekly, The Nation, with the folksy populist Ameringer bringing his regular column to that publication's pages.

== Personal life and death ==
Oscar Ameringer died age 73 on November 5, 1943.
