= Minnie Rutherford Fuller =

American reformer and suffragist (1868–1946)

- Born: Minnie Ursula Oliver; January 25, 1868; Ozark, Arkansas, U.S.
- Died: October 15, 1946 (aged 78)
- Education: Sullins College (MA)
- Occupations: Farmer; broker; temperance leader; suffragist; lobbyist
- Spouse(s): O. H. Scott (m. 1882) W. B. Rutherford (m. 1889) Seabron J. Fuller (m. 1915)

Minnie Rutherford Fuller (née, Oliver; after first marriage, Scott; after second marriage, Rutherford; after third marriage, Fuller; January 25, 1868 – October 15, 1946) was an American farmer, broker, temperance leader, suffragist, and lobbyist. She served as president of the Arkansas Woman's Christian Temperance Union (W.C.T.U.).

== Early life and education ==
Minnie Ursula Oliver was born at Ozark, Arkansas, January 25, 1868.

She was educated at Sullins College, Bristol, Virginia (A.M). She also studied at University of Chicago, at Nancy, France, at Florence, Italy, and at the Leipzig University (Germany), Harvard University, and University of California, Berkeley.

== Career ==
Fuller was an active worker for temperance as well as for other reforms. In spite of the duties necessarily connected with her vocation of farm manager and broker, she found time to devote herself to work for the betterment of others. In 1913, she accepted the position of president of the Arkansas W.C.T.U. Before this, she had been actively engaged with the Union as organizer and speaker and in other capacities, campaigning throughout the State, besides spending time attending sessions of the Legislature, seeking to promote the passage of various reform measures. Among these were the White Slave Law, the Juvenile Court, and several Prohibition bills. Under her presidency, the State W.C.T.U. membership increased and continued to grow. As president of the State Union, she was an ex-officio vice-president of the National W.C.T.U.

During the 1918-20 term of the General Federation of Women's Clubs, Fuller served as vice-chair of the Legislation Department. In 1921, Fuller was a member of the commission appointed by the Governor of Arkansas to make a survey of the state's school system. Owing largely to the resourcefulness and activity of Fuller, Arkansas obtained a Woman’s State Farm, State Industrial School, and its Commission of Charities and Correction.

A social activist, Rutherford Fuller was one of the founders of the Political Equality League (PEL). For Fuller, women's suffrage would help the passage of the kinds of reforms and community improvement that she supported. Fuller and Olive Gatlin Leigh testified in 1911 about proposed suffrage legislation at a Committee meeting held at the Marion Hotel. Fuller was involved in the state's suffrage struggle of 1915.

== Personal life ==
Rutherford-Fuller was married three times: in 1882 to O. H. Scott, Magazine, Arkansas; in 1889 to W. B. Rutherford, Little Rock, Arkansas; and in 1915 to Dr. Seabron J. Fuller.

Minnie Rutherford Fuller died October 15, 1946.
