= Lizzie Dorman Fyler =

American suffragist

- Born: Eliza Dorman; March 11, 1850; Massachusetts
- Died: November 11, 1885 (aged 35); Eureka Springs, Arkansas
- Spouse: Frank F. Fyler (m. 1870)
- Children: 1

Eliza A. Dorman Fyler (March 11, 1850 – November 11, 1885) was an American political activist and suffragist who formed the first Arkansas Woman Suffrage Association in 1881. Although women were disallowed from becoming lawyers, Fourth Circuit judge J. M. Pittman allowed Fyler to practice law in his court.

== Early life ==
Eliza Dorman was born to parents Dr. Uriah Dorman and Eliza Alma Dormanon on March 11, 1850, in Massachusetts. She moved with her family to Wisconsin in 1853.

== Career ==
Fyler moved to Arkansas in 1880, and applied for admission to the state bar association to practice law. Although she was originally denied, Fourth Circuit judge J. M. Pittman allowed Fyler to practice law in his court due to a loophole in the constitutional provision. The next year, Fyler formed and became president of the first Arkansas Woman Suffrage Association in Eureka Springs. A major part of her advocacy was encouraging women to vote, as this was seen as "unwomanly."

In 1884, she traveled to Washington, D. C, to attend the annual convention of the National American Woman Suffrage Association. However, by 1885 the Arkansas Woman Suffrage Association was dissolved and Fyler died.

== Personal life ==
Fyler married Frank F. Fyler in 1870. They had one daughter, born in 1871.
