= Freda Ameringer =

Socialist organizer (1892–1988)

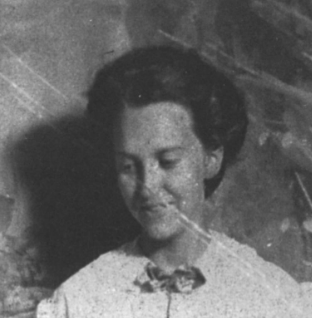
- Freda Hogan in the 1910s
- Born: November 17, 1892; Huntington, Arkansas, U.S.
- Died: October 4, 1988 (aged 95); Oklahoma City, Oklahoma, U.S.
- Spouse: Oscar Ameringer

Freda Hogan Ameringer (November 17, 1892 – October 4, 1988) was a socialist organizer in Arkansas and Oklahoma. She founded the Oklahoma Urban League in 1946. She was also involved in fighting for women's suffrage in Arkansas.

== Biography ==
Ameringer was born in Huntington, Arkansas on November 17, 1892. Her parents were members of the Socialist Party in Arkansas. When her father ran for office in 1910, Ameringer took over the daily operations of the Huntington Herald newspaper. In 1914, she was heavily involved with the Socialist Party of Arkansas, serving as secretary. During the 1914 conflict with the United Mine Workers (UMWA) and the management at Prairie Creek Mine No. 4, Ameringer publicized the events. She wrote about how guards associated with management intimidated workers and their families.

By 1912, she was well-known as an active suffragist in Arkansas. In 1915, Ameringer joined the Socialist Party's Woman's National Committee (WNC) to work on equal suffrage and organizing women. When women were granted partial suffrage in Arkansas in 1917, she worked to organize women in Huntington on voting issues. Ameringer organized women in Huntington to pay poll taxes in order to vote in the 1918 primary elections.

Ameringer was opposed to the United States entry in World War I. Around 1917, Ameringer moved to Oklahoma City where she worked as an organizer and journalist. She was one of the founders of the Oklahoma Daily Leader. In 1930, she married Oscar Ameringer. Frieda went on to organize community centers and organizations in Oklahoma City. She fought against segregation and "right to work" rules.

She died in Oklahoma City on October 4, 1988.
