= Tornado outbreak sequence of March 18–24, 2012 =

Tornado outbreak in the United States

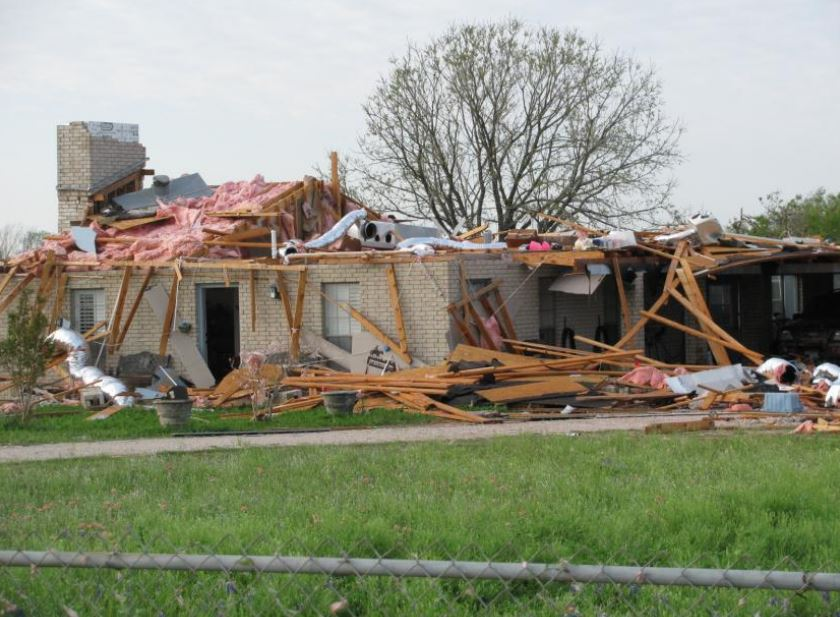
- EF2 damage to a home near LaCoste, Texas.

Meteorological history
- Formed: March 18, 2012
- Dissipated: March 24, 2012

Tornado outbreak
- Tornadoes: 63
- Max. rating: EF3 tornado
- Duration: 7 days

Overall effects
- Fatalities: 1
- Injuries: 15
- Damage: $325 million (estimated)

The Tornado outbreak sequence of March 18–24, 2012 was a long lasting tornado outbreak that occurred due to a slow moving, but powerful trough and cutoff low. The outbreak began in the Great Plains, where, over a two-day period, several tornadoes touched down, some of which were significant. The North Platte area was damaged by an EF3 that was produced by a supercell that spawned many tornadoes throughout its lifespan. The tornadic activity then shifted the Southern United States over subsequent days, particularly in Louisiana and Mississippi. These states were struck by a series of tornadoes for 3 days, most of which were relatively weak on the Enhanced Fujita Scale. However, a few reached EF2 intensity and caused considerable damage. Tornado activity continued across the Ohio Valley on the 23rd, with one confirmed fatality in southern Illinois.

== Meteorological synopsis ==
=== March 18–19 ===
As a powerful trough ejected into the Central Plains on March 18, the Storm Prediction Center issued a Slight risk for Severe Weather stretching from southern Nebraska to western Texas. That evening, many supercells evolved across the Texas Panhandle and Oklahoma, producing large hail and damaging wind gusts. As the supercells moved towards the northeast, four tornadoes were produced across western Oklahoma, all rated an EF0 on the Enhanced Fujita Scale. Early that night, a tornado-producing supercell moved across southwestern Nebraska, where four tornadoes were confirmed. The first was an EF3, the second was an EF1, the third was an EF3, and the fourth was an EF2. Severe damage was noted just to the west of the city of North Platte, Nebraska. The following day, the Storm Prediction Center issued a Moderate risk of Severe Weather, encompassing much of central and eastern Texas, into southeastern Oklahoma and extreme western Arkansas. Although this event was not as severe as initially anticipated, EF2 tornadoes caused severe damage in Texas as they impacted areas in and around Devine, Gardendale, and Lytle.

=== March 20–22 ===
The slow moving system produced a series of tornadoes across the South for 3 days. Most of the damage occurred in Mississippi and Louisiana. An EF2 caused significant damage near Port Gibson, Mississippi, and another EF2 badly damaged a home near Pelahatchie. The town of Gueydan, Louisiana also sustained a direct hit from an EF2 tornado. An EF1 tornado also damaged at least 30 homes in Lake Arthur, Louisiana. Other tornadoes occurred along the Gulf Coast, and one touched down in North Carolina as well.

=== March 23–24 ===
A slight risk was issued for parts of the Ohio Valley, but notable tornado activity was not expected. However, several tornadoes touched down across Indiana, Illinois, Ohio, and Kentucky. Supercell thunderstorms developed and produced large hail as well. One high-end EF1 tornado caused considerable damage to homes in the Louisville metro area. An EF2 tornado caused one fatality in southern Illinois when a mobile home was thrown and completely destroyed. On the 24th, an isolated EF0 touched down in Florida as the outbreak moved eastward and came to an end.

== Confirmed tornadoes ==
Confirmed tornadoes by Enhanced Fujita rating
EFU	EF0	EF1	EF2	EF3	EF4	EF5	Total
0	36	17	8	2	0	0	63

=== March 18 event ===
List of reported tornadoes - Sunday, March 18, 2012
EF#	Location	County	Coord.	Time (UTC)	Path length	Comments/Damage
Oklahoma
EF0	W of Mangum	Greer	34.88°N 99.68°W	2350	3.85 miles (6.20 km)	No damage reported with this tornado.
EF0	WSW of Brinkman	Greer	34.96°N 99.60°W	0010	0.1 miles (160 m)	No damage reported with this tornado.
EF0	WNW of Willow	Greer	35.07°N 99.56°W	0027	1.4 miles (2.3 km)	No damage reported with this tornado.
EF0	NW of Willow	Greer	35.10°N 99.57°W	0037	1 mile (1.6 km)	No damage reported. This tornado was from the same supercell that produced the other tornadoes in Greer County.
Nebraska
EF3	SW of North Platte	Lincoln	41.09°N 100.83°W	0210	6.7 miles (10.8 km)	Two homes were damaged and a large metal truss tower was destroyed. Outbuildings are garages were destroyed or damaged, two irrigation pivots were overturned, and a wooden transmission tower was destroyed. Extensive tree and power line damage occurred along the path. Two people were injured.
EF1	WSW of North Platte	Lincoln	41.12°N 100.86°W	0213	1.5 miles (2.4 km)	A semi-truck and fence line were destroyed. A garage was damaged and an irrigation pivot was destroyed. Extensive tree damage occurred, debris was scattered through fields, and one person was injured.
EF3	NW of North Platte (1st tornado)	Lincoln	41.13°N 100.85°W	0214	1.7 miles (2.7 km)	Two homes were destroyed and two others suffered significant damage. Debris from impacted structures was scattered up to a mile and a half away. Fifteen train cars and an irrigation pivot were overturned. Two people were injured.
EF2	NW of North Platte (2nd tornado)	Lincoln	41.17°N 100.87°W	0218	1.7 miles (2.7 km)	Two homes were heavily damaged and a barn was destroyed, with debris from the barn driven into the ground. Garages and outbuildings were damaged or destroyed, and extensive tree damage occurred.
EF0	SSE of Ringgold	McPherson	41.44°N 100.77°W	0239	5.3 miles (8.5 km)	A church and a small storage building were damaged, and a pivot irrigation system was twisted and overturned. Trees were uprooted and limbs were snapped as well.
EF0	NNW of Valentine	Cherry	42.92°N 100.59°W	0319	100 yards (91 m)	Brief touchdown with no damage.
Sources: SPC Storm Reports for 03/18/12, NWS Norman, OK, NWS North Platte, NE

=== March 19 event ===
List of reported tornadoes - Monday, March 19, 2012
EF#	Location	County	Coord.	Time (UTC)	Path length	Comments/Damage
Texas
EF2	Gardendale	Ector	32.03°N 102.34°W	0628	1 mile (1.6 km)	A camper was flipped, a cinder block fence was toppled, and a barn and trailer were destroyed. One house in Gardendale suffered significant roof damage and was shifted off of its foundation, and several power poles were damaged. A horse trailer and a cotton trailer were tossed, and a travel trailer was destroyed. Large amounts of debris was scattered throughout the area, some of which was speared into the walls of adjacent structures. Three people were injured.
EF2	WNW of Devine	Medina	29.14°N 98.94°W	0106	3.5 miles (5.6 km)	A semi-trailer was overturned and a mobile home was destroyed. Multiple permanent homes had roofs torn off or sustained major structural damage. A metal storage shed was largely destroyed, and trees and power lines were downed. 14 homes were destroyed, 11 sustained major damage, and 7 others sustained minor damage.
EF1	W of Lytle	Medina	29.18°N 98.84°W	0120	7 miles (11 km)	Power lines were knocked down and an RV was flipped.
EF2	ENE of Lytle to E of LaCoste	Bexar	29.24°N 98.76°W	0130	5 miles (8.0 km)	This strong tornado destroyed four frame homes and four mobile homes. Five other homes were severely damaged, and two others sustained minor damage. Four people were injured.
Kansas
EF0	ESE of Montrose	Jewell	39.77°N 98.04°W	1055	0.8 miles (1.3 km)	A large machine shed was destroyed.
Minnesota
EF0	S of Elysian	Waseca, Le Sueur	44.17°N 93.68°W	2325	7 miles (11 km)	Numerous trees and several structures were damaged along the path. Homes sustained roof damage, a metal shed was destroyed, and boat docks were lifted and thrown at Lake Francis.
Oklahoma
EF0	NW of Vian	Sequoyah	35.52°N 95.00°W	0120	0.1 miles (160 m)	Brief tornado remained over open country, causing no damage.
Arkansas
EF1	SW of Uniontown to WSW of Chester	Crawford	35.58°N 94.44°W	0252	13 miles (21 km)	The roof of a mobile home was damaged, and numerous trees were snapped or uprooted.
EF0	Fayetteville	Washington	36.09°N 94.14°W	0320	1 mile (1.6 km)	Several homes and a Walmart in town sustained damage, and a few trees and tree limbs were snapped.
Sources: SPC Storm Reports for 03/19/12, NWS Odessa, TX, NWS San Antonio, TX, NWS Tulsa, OK

=== March 20 event ===
List of reported tornadoes - Tuesday, March 20, 2012
EF#	Location	County	Coord.	Time (UTC)	Path length	Comments/Damage
Texas
EF0	E of San Antonio International Airport	Bexar	29.54°N 98.41°W	0555	0.75 miles (1.21 km)	A post office and 10 homes suffered minor damage, with another home suffering major damage. Fences and vegetation sustained damage as well.
EF0	Kirby	Bexar	29.49°N 98.38°W	0559	0.25 miles (400 m)	A few homes sustained minor damage, along with fences and vegetation.
EF0	Runge	Karnes	28.88°N 97.72°W	0905	0.25 miles (400 m)	Houses and outbuildings in Runge suffered minor damage. A few trees were downed as well.
Louisiana
EF0	E of Zwolle	Sabine	31.64°N 93.56°W	1636	3 miles (4.8 km)	Several trees were snapped and uprooted and a few power lines were downed.
EF0	SE of Goldonna	Natchitoches, Winn	32.00°N 92.89°W	1815	2.1 miles (3.4 km)	Several trees were snapped or blown down, some of which landed on railroad tracks. Power lines were also downed.
EF0	E of Natchitoches	Natchitoches	31.76°N 93.06°W	0228	1 mile (1.6 km)	Three mobile homes sustained damage, one with moderate roof damage. One tree was snapped as well.
Sources: SPC Storm Reports for 03/20/12, NWS Shreveport, LA

=== March 21 event ===
List of reported tornadoes - Wednesday, March 21, 2012
EF#	Location	County	Coord.	Time (UTC)	Path length	Comments/Damage
Louisiana
EF0	S of Sikes	Winn	32.05°N 92.49°W	0814	0.4 miles (0.64 km)	A few trees were snapped.
EF1	Lake Arthur	Jefferson Davis	30.08°N 92.68°W	0930	2 miles (3.2 km)	An estimated 30 to 40 homes were damaged, barns were destroyed, trees we’re downed, and an antenna was blown off the top of a water tower in town.
EF2	Gueydan	Vermilion	30.01°N 92.51°W	0945	2.5 miles (4.0 km)	A tied-down mobile home in Gueydan was rolled upside down and completely destroyed. Five homes and city hall sustained significant roof damage. About 20 more homes received minor damage, and grave stones were blown over at a local cemetery. Several outbuildings were destroyed and numerous trees were downed. One minor injury occurred.
EF0	W of Henry	Vermilion	29.88°N 92.10°W	1035	1 mile (1.6 km)	Damage consisted of a roof blown off of a barn, several outbuildings damaged, and several trees snapped.
EF1	E of Abbeville	Vermilion	29.97°N 92.12°W	1045	1.5 miles (2.4 km)	A garage and a portable building were destroyed, and trees and telephone poles were snapped.
EF0	Patterson	St. Mary	29.69°N 91.31°W	1257	1 mile (1.6 km)	A large industrial building had its garage doors blown in, and sheet metal was removed from other buildings and scattered throughout the area.
EF1	N of Clarks	Caldwell	32.05°N 92.15°W	1330	4.1 miles (6.6 km)	Twenty homes were damaged, while one mobile home and several outbuildings were destroyed. Many trees were snapped or uprooted.
EF1	Prairieville	Ascension	30.30°N 90.97°W	1434	3 miles (4.8 km)	Several homes in town sustained significant roof damage, and numerous trees were snapped or uprooted by this high-end EF1 tornado.
EF1	E of Kleinpeter	East Baton Rouge	30.34°N 90.94°W	1443	0.6 miles (0.97 km)	Several homes suffered roof damage and numerous trees were downed.
EF1	NE of Corbin	Livingston	30.53°N 90.83°W	1505	0.6 miles (0.97 km)	Several trees were downed, and a house lost part of its roof.
EF0	NE of Madisonville	St. Tammany	30.43°N 90.13°W	1716	0.5 miles (0.80 km)	Brief tornado caused minor damage to two homes and downed trees.
EF0	NE of Abita Springs	St. Tammany	30.49°N 90.02°W	1735	1.4 miles (2.3 km)	Several trees were downed, one of which fell through the roof of a house.
North Carolina
EF0	ENE of Wenona	Washington	35.73°N 76.63°W	1500	100 yards (91 m)	Brief tornado remained over an open field and caused no damage.
Mississippi
EF1	E of McNair	Jefferson	31.64°N 91.02°W	1523	3 miles (4.8 km)	Numerous trees were snapped or uprooted along the path.
EF2	NNE of Port Gibson	Claiborne, Warren	32.09°N 90.99°W	1551	10 miles (16 km)	Two mobile homes were destroyed and four power poles were snapped. A brick home sustained major roof damage, and three large outbuildings were destroyed. Numerous trees were snapped or uprooted, one of which landed on a house and caused significant damage.
EF1	SE of Vicksburg	Warren	32.30°N 90.86°W	1611	1.75 miles (2.82 km)	A building had its metal roof peeled back, while a trailer and a mobile home were overturned. Many trees were downed, some of which landed on homes.
EF2	WSW of Pelahatchie	Rankin	32.29°N 89.84°W	1904	6.3 miles (10.1 km)	Narrow but strong tornado tore much of the roof from a large home and partially collapsed the back exterior wall. Many large trees were snapped and uprooted along the path.
EF0	SE of Eastabuchie	Forrest	31.42°N 89.25°W	2100	0.3 miles (0.48 km)	Brief tornado snapped several trees, one of which fell on and destroyed a fence. Shingles were torn off of a home.
EF0	SW of Soso	Jones	31.73°N 89.33°W	2231	0.2 miles (0.32 km)	Brief tornado heavily damaged the roof of a chicken house and uprooted a tree.
EF0	NW of Long Beach	Harrison	30.48°N 89.31°W	0132	0.25 miles (0.40 km)	Brief tornado damaged a trailer.
EF0	ESE of Paulding	Jasper	32.02°N 89.02°W	0203	0.5 miles (0.80 km)	Brief tornado uprooted several trees.
EF1	NNE of Gulfport	Harrison	30.59°N 88.97°W	0535	1 mile (1.6 km)	A trailer was flipped and several homes lost part of their roofs. Trees were damaged as well.
Sources: SPC Storm Reports for 03/20/12, SPC Storm Reports for 03/21/12, NWS Shreveport, LA, NWS Lake Charles, LA, NWS Newport / Morehead City, NC, NWS Jackson, MS

=== March 22 event ===
List of reported tornadoes - Thursday, March 22, 2012
EF#	Location	County	Coord.	Time (UTC)	Path length	Comments/Damage
Mississippi
EF0	N of Biloxi	Harrison	30.49°N 88.93°W	1010	4.1 miles (6.6 km)	A large shed had its door blown in and sustained roof damage. Several residences sustained fence and shingle damage, and a patio roof was lifted off.
Sources: SPC Storm Reports for 03/21/12

=== March 23 event ===
List of reported tornadoes - Friday, March 23, 2012
EF#	Location	County	Coord.	Time (UTC)	Path length	Comments/Damage
Alabama
EF1	NNW of Troy	Pike	31.83°N 86.04°W	1426	1.7 miles (2.7 km)	Several trees and tree limbs were snapped or uprooted. Two houses, three chicken barns, and a single-wide manufactured home also sustained damage.
EF0	NW of Malvern	Geneva	31.15°N 85.56°W	1748	1.7 miles (2.7 km)	A few houses suffered minor roof damage and several trees were downed.
Missouri
EF0	Cape Girardeau	Cape Girardeau	37.33°N 89.50°W	1633	0.25 miles (400 m)	Brief tornado caused roof damage to several homes in a neighborhood and downed a few small trees.
EF1	NW of Neely's Landing	Cape Girardeau	37.52°N 89.52°W	1638	0.6 miles (0.97 km)	Trees and power lines were downed by this brief tornado.
Illinois
EF0	E of Murphysboro	Jackson	37.76°N 89.27°W	1714	1.8 miles (2.9 km)	A few trees and tree limbs were downed along the path.
EF1	NW of Desoto	Jackson	37.85°N 89.27°W	1724	7.5 miles (12.1 km)	Dozens of trees were uprooted or snapped, and homes sustained roof and siding damage. Several sheds, barns, and carports were damaged, and a flag pole was blown down.
EF2	NW of Opdyke	Jefferson	38.26°N 88.79°W	1826	2.5 miles (4.0 km)	1 death – A tied-down double-wide mobile home was thrown 100 feet (30 m) and obliterated by this high-end EF2 tornado, killing one person inside and injuring two others. The metal undercarriage was found 200 yards (180 m) away from where it originated. A house had its windows blown out, and trees were snapped and uprooted. Three barns were also damaged, one heavily.
EF0	NNE of Kell	Marion	38.53°N 88.88°W	1857	100 yards (91 m)	Brief touchdown caused no damage.
Kentucky
EF1	Heritage Creek	Jefferson	38.09°N 85.62°W	1807	2.5 miles (4.0 km)	This high-end EF1 tornado caused considerable damage in suburban areas of southeastern Louisville. A frail modular home sustained collapse of its first floor, causing it to pancake underneath the second floor. Another home had its roof blown off, while numerous other homes sustained roof, window, and siding damage.
EF1	E of Finchville	Shelby	38.15°N 85.29°W	1828	2.25 miles (3.62 km)	Two barns were destroyed and a trailer was overturned. Two more barns lost their roofs, with metal debris from one of them scattered through fields and into trees. Dozens of trees were snapped or uprooted as well.
Georgia
EF0	S of Kolomoki Mounds State Park	Early	31.43°N 84.95°W	2020	3.6 miles (5.8 km)	Several trees were downed and a few structures sustained minor roof damage.
Indiana
EF0	WNW of Center Square	Switzerland	38.83°N 85.05°W	2039	unknown	Brief tornado remained over open country and caused no damage.
Ohio
EF0	NE of Butlerville	Warren	39.32°N 84.07°W	2330	0.5 miles (0.80 km)	A pole barn sustained severe damage, with debris scattered up to a quarter-mile away. Debris from the pole barn was driven into the roof of a house, a second barn also sustained damage, and trees were snapped or uprooted.
EF0	Clarksville	Clinton	39.39°N 83.98°W	2350	0.3 miles (0.48 km)	Brief tornado touched down in Clarksville, where homes sustained roof damage and had windows blown out. Fences and play sets were blown over, and trees were snapped or uprooted.
Sources: SPC Storm Reports for 03/23/12, NWS Louisville, NWS Birmingham, NWS Paducah, KY, NWS Wilmington, OH

=== March 24 event ===
List of reported tornadoes - Saturday, March 24, 2012
EF#	Location	County	Coord.	Time (UTC)	Path length	Comments/Damage
Florida
EF0	Alachua	Alachua	29.75°N 82.56°W	1840	4.6 miles (7.4 km)	Two homes and a carport were damaged, and trees were snapped.
Sources: SPC Storm Reports for 03/24/12, NCDC Storm Events Database

== See also ==
- List of North American tornadoes and tornado outbreaks
- Tornadoes of 2012
  - List of United States tornadoes in March 2012
