= List of United States tornadoes in March 2012 =

This is a list of all tornadoes that were confirmed by local offices of the National Weather Service in the United States in March 2012.

== United States yearly total ==
Confirmed tornadoes by Enhanced Fujita rating
EFU	EF0	EF1	EF2	EF3	EF4	EF5	Total
0	583	241	94	26	4	0	939

== March ==
Confirmed tornadoes by Enhanced Fujita rating
EFU	EF0	EF1	EF2	EF3	EF4	EF5	Total
0	75	39	22	12	2	0	150

=== March 1 event ===
List of reported tornadoes - Thursday, March 1, 2012
EF#	Location	County	Coord.	Time (UTC)	Path length	Comments/Damage
Virginia
EF0	NW of Bristol	Washington	36.63°N 82.22°W	0532	0.6 miles (0.97 km)	A shed, several barns, and numerous trees were damaged.
Tennessee
EF0	S of Seymour	Blount	35.83°N 83.80°W	0705	1.5 miles (2.4 km)	Tornado damaged a few trees.
Alabama
EF1	S of Slocomb	Geneva	31.05°N 85.61°W	1912	1.25 miles (2.01 km)	Power poles were toppled and several trees were uprooted or snapped. Two houses were damaged.
EF1	SSE of Slocomb	Geneva	31.081°N 85.579°W	1914	0.3 miles (0.48 km)	Brief tornado snapped a number of trees.
Sources: SPC Storm Reports for 03/01/12, NWS Morristown, NWS Tallahassee, FL

=== March 2 event ===
List of reported tornadoes – Friday, March 2, 2012 (Note: All dates are based on the local time zone where the tornado touched down; however, all times are in Coordinated Universal Time and dates are split at midnight CDT for consistency.)
EF#	Location	County / Parish	State	Start Coord.	Time (UTC)	Path length	Max width	Summary
EF3	S of Athens to N of Meridianville to NE of New Market	Limestone, Madison	AL	34.7597°N 86.9531°W	15:10–16:00	33.99 mi (54.70 km)	250 yd (230 m)	This tornado first moved through multiple subdivisions near Athens, with roofs torn off homes, windows and garage doors blown out, exterior walls damaged, and garages collapsed. The tornado then caused major roof and exterior wall damage to homes in and around Harvest. Homes at the north edge of Meridianville had their roofs torn off, a metal shed was severely damaged, a concrete power pole was snapped, and buildings at Meridianville Middle School sustained roof damage. The most intense damage occurred near Hazel Green, where several homes had roofs torn off and walls collapsed, and three were reduced to rubble. Several additional concrete power poles were snapped as well. The tornado then caused shingle damage to homes near New Market before dissipating. Many trees and power lines were downed along the path as well.
EF2	Meridianville to SW of New Market	Madison	AL	34.8502°N 86.5702°W	16:06–16:15	7.26 mi (11.68 km)	220 yd (200 m)	Homes were damaged to varying degrees by this high-end EF2 tornado, with a few poorly constructed homes destroyed. Silos, garages, and barns were damaged or destroyed, and many trees and power poles were snapped. Buckhorn High School was damaged, with vehicles moved and damaged in the parking lot and a cinder block structure on the property collapsed.
EF1	N of Francisco, AL	Jackson (AL), Franklin (TN)	AL, TN	34.985°N 86.2552°W	16:08–16:15	0.93 mi (1.50 km)	100 yd (91 m)	Trees were snapped and uprooted. This tornado came from the same supercell that produced the Athens EF3.
EF0	Northern New Baden	Clinton	IL	38.5528°N 89.6933°W	16:11–16:12	0.65 mi (1.05 km)	50 yd (46 m)	Weak tornado struck the north side of New Baden, causing minor roof damage to several homes in a subdivision and snapping off tree tops. Several fences were blown over as well.
EF1	N of Haletown (1st tornado)	Marion	TN	35.05°N 85.5416°W	17:15–17:16	0.5 mi (0.80 km)	100 yd (91 m)	Brief tornado snapped trees and tree limbs.
EF3	NW of Harrison to N of Cleveland to SE of Etowah	Hamilton, Bradley, Polk, McMinn	TN	35.128°N 85.1608°W	17:41–18:35	41 mi (66 km)	400 yd (370 m)	This long-tracked, rain-wrapped tornado first produced high-end EF3 damage in the Chattanooga suburb of Harrison as it impacted multiple subdivisions and badly damaged a marina. 80 homes were destroyed, 85 were severely damaged, and 260 were damaged to a lesser extent in Harrison. One home in this area was leveled, and large wooded areas were completely mowed down. EF2 house and tree damage occurred further northeast before the tornado struck northern Cleveland, destroying two businesses and five homes, and damaging 41 more homes. Many trees were snapped and a few barns were destroyed in this area as well. The tornado continued to weaken as additional barns were destroyed further along the path, while minor tree and house damage occurred. Restrengthening occurred near Etowah before the tornado dissipated. High-end EF2 damage was observed near Etowah, with 4 homes and 7 mobile homes destroyed and 37 others damaged. 44 people were injured, some severely.
EF0	S of Carmi	White	IL	38.0378°N 88.1708°W	18:28–18:31	2.6 mi (4.2 km)	100 yd (91 m)	A body shop was damaged, some tree damage was observed, and a metal carport was destroyed by this short-lived tornado.
EF2	S of Wadesville	Posey	IN	38.083°N 87.8494°W	18:37–18:43	6.07 mi (9.77 km)	140 yd (130 m)	One wood-frame home had its roof torn off and part of an exterior wall collapsed, while several other homes were damaged to varying degrees. A wooden beam was driven through the brick exterior wall of one home. Over 100 trees were snapped and uprooted and grain bins were destroyed. Oil tanks were blown over, and several sheds and garages were destroyed.
EF2	NW of Tellico Plains to Eastern Unicoi Mountains	Monroe	TN	38.083°N 87.8494°W	1847–19:03	14.31 mi (23.03 km)	400 yd (370 m)	This tornado moved directly through downtown Tellico Plains. About 30 homes, businesses, mobile homes, and other structures were damaged in town. A few of these structures were destroyed, including the police department and a telephone company building. The cabins, main lodge, and pavilion at a campground were leveled. Hundreds of trees were snapped or uprooted along the path as well, and three people were injured.
EF0	SE of Darmstadt	Vanderburgh	IN	38.0924°N 87.5707°W	19:00–19:03	2.05 mi (3.30 km)	50 yd (46 m)	Tornado remained over open country, causing no damage.
EF2	SE of Uniontown	Union	KY	37.7451°N 87.9085°W	19:38–19:44	6.56 mi (10.56 km)	200 yd (180 m)	A home had its roof torn off. A grain bin and several barns were destroyed or damaged, along with mainly minor damage to a few homes and other structures. Several trees and power poles were blown down. One person sustained minor injuries.
EF4	Southern Fredericksburg, IN to Henryville, IN to NNW of Bedford, KY	Washington (IN), Clark (IN), Scott (IN), Jefferson (IN), Trimble (KY)	IN, KY	38.4316°N 86.1893°W	19:50–20:39	46.61 mi (75.01 km)	800 yd (730 m)	11 deaths – See section on this tornado.
EF0	W of Elkmont	Limestone	AL	34.9155°N 87.0466°W	19:55–19:59	2.73 mi (4.39 km)	50 yd (46 m)	Weak tornado uprooted several trees and snapped tree limbs.
EF0	E of Rock Springs	Henderson	KY	37.7242°N 87.5804°W	19:55–19:59	3.84 mi (6.18 km)	100 yd (91 m)	A small shed was destroyed and several barns lost portions of their roofs. A house also lost a few shingles and several trees were downed.
EF0	Dixon	Webster	KY	37.5108°N 87.7068°W	20:06–20:08	0.76 mi (1.22 km)	50 yd (46 m)	A brief tornado downed tree limbs and a few signs in and around Dixon.
EF0	E of Owensboro	Daviess	KY	37.7615°N 87.0509°W	20:22	0.25 mi (400 m)	50 yd (46 m)	Brief tornado remained over open country, causing no damage.
EF1	Henryville	Clark	IN	38.5154°N 85.8758°W	20:30–20:36	6.57 mi (10.57 km)	60 yd (55 m)	This tornado was spawned by a second supercell that trailed behind the initial EF4 that struck town less than 30 minutes earlier. The tornado caused damage to trees and homes in Henryville and was accompanied by very large damaging hail.
EF2	SSW of Hawesville to SE of Stephensport	Hancock, Breckinridge	KY	37.8345°N 86.7814°W	20:38	16.49 mi (26.54 km)	200 yd (180 m)	Intermittent tornado struck two chicken farms with large chicken houses damaged and destroyed, and hundreds of chickens killed or lost. Several trees were downed, and outbuildings were damaged or destroyed. Several homes sustained minor to moderate damage as well. The circulation passed over the city of Cloverport as a funnel cloud, causing no damage there.
EF3	SSE of Milton	Trimble, Carroll	KY	38.6579°N 85.2632°W	20:41–20:48	5.66 mi (9.11 km)	75 yd (69 m)	A metal fire station building was destroyed, with a pumper tanker inside being damaged. A nearby two ton concession trailer was moved 30 yards, while a pickup truck was moved 60 yards. Several homes were damaged, one of which sustained collapse of exterior walls. Mobile homes were destroyed, and a metal truss tower was toppled to the ground. Outbuildings were damaged and destroyed, and extensive tree damage occurred.
EF0	Boonshill	Lincoln	TN	35.2116°N 86.7422°W	20:45–20:47	0.62 mi (1.00 km)	50 yd (46 m)	Weak tornado struck the rural community of Boonshill, causing shingle damage to the community center building, downing several trees, and destroying an old barn.
EF3	Holton to SE of Osgood	Ripley	IN	39.0667°N 85.407°W	20:52–21:02	8.69 mi (13.99 km)	350 yd (320 m)	3 deaths – This strong tornado caused major damage in Holton, where frame homes were heavily damaged or destroyed and mobile homes were obliterated. A cinder-block structure was leveled, vehicles were moved and damaged, outbuildings and large grain bins were destroyed, and many trees in town were snapped and denuded. Minor damage to farms occurred outside of town before the tornado dissipated. Two people died in Holton immediately after the tornado. A third fatality occurred when an injured person succumbed in January 2013. Five other people were injured.
EF1	SSE of Bedford	Trimble	KY	38.5374°N 85.2893°W	21:01–21:04	2.73 mi (4.39 km)	100 yd (91 m)	Numerous trees and power lines snapped and a 4-wheeler was moved 30 feet. Two barns and a mobile home were destroyed. Homes sustained roof and gutter damage as well.
EF0	SW of Guston	Meade	KY	37.88°N 86.24°W	2102	0.66 mi (1.06 km)	30 yd (27 m)	Brief tornado blew the porch off of a house and damaged a sign at a business.
EF1	WNW of Port Royal	Henry	KY	38.56°N 85.11°W	2112	0.25 mi (0.40 km)	40 yd (37 m)	Trees were twisted and downed along a narrow path.
EF4	Crittenden to S of Morning View	Grant, Kenton	KY	38.79°N 84.63°W	2123	9.85 mi (15.85 km)	880 yd (800 m)	4 deaths – See section on this tornado. 8 people were injured.
EF2	N of Owenton	Owen	KY	38.60°N 84.89°W	2124	5.4 mi (8.7 km)	150 yd (140 m)	A house sustained total removal of its roof and partial collapse of some exterior walls. Several barns were completely destroyed, and a semi-trailer was overturned. Several other homes and outbuildings sustained minor damage. Three people were injured.
EF0	N of Athens	Limestone	AL	34.86°N 87.01°W	2126	5 mi (8.0 km)	75 yd (69 m)	Weak tornado uprooted several trees and snapped tree limbs.
EF3	W of Peach Grove, KY to S of Hamersville, OH	Campbell (KY), Pendleton (KY), Clermont (OH), Brown (OH)	KY, OH	38.84°N 84.35°W	2139	20.4 mi (32.8 km)	440 yd (400 m)	3 deaths – See section on this tornado. 13 people were injured.
EF1	NE of Athens	Limestone	AL	34.92°N 86.86°W	2139	2.6 mi (4.2 km)	150 yd (140 m)	Homes sustained mostly minor siding and shingle damage, though one home sustained severe damage to its roof. A garage was damaged, and a well-built barn lost most of its roof. Many trees were snapped and uprooted as well.
EF1	S of Kingston Springs	Cheatham	TN	36.10°N 87.10°W	2148	1 mi (1.6 km)	100 yd (91 m)	A barn was destroyed, several houses sustained minor roof damage, and trees were snapped. Widespread downburst and hail damage occurred north of the tornado track across the remainder of Kingston Springs, where many buildings suffered considerable roof, window and siding damage.
EF1	N of Braggs to E of Hayneville	Lowndes	AL	32.09°N 86.78°W	2153	17.64 mi (28.39 km)	400 yd (370 m)	Many trees were snapped and uprooted and two homes sustained roof damage. Barns and outbuildings were damaged and destroyed, and pieces of farming equipment were tossed up to 100 yards away. Sheet metal was wrapped around trees and power lines were downed as well.
EF0	Berlin	Bracken	KY	38.69°N 84.17°W	2202	0.15 mi (240 m)	50 yd (46 m)	A garage was destroyed, a power pole was snapped, and there was heavy damage to a barn. Wooden 2x4s from the barn were speared deeply into the ground, and numerous trees were snapped by this brief tornado.
EF1	E of Alvaton	Warren	KY	36.87°N 86.31°W	2205	0.5 mi (0.80 km)	60 yd (55 m)	A tornado embedded within a larger area of straight line winds destroyed a barn and tool shed.
EF1	NNW of Seaman	Adams	OH	38.95°N 83.59°W	2225	2.95 mi (4.75 km)	400 yd (370 m)	Tornado destroyed several outbuildings and pole barns, tore part of the roof off of a home, and caused roof damage to another home. Numerous trees were snapped or uprooted.
EF0	SW of West Union	Adams	OH	38.78°N 83.57°W	2230	0.15 mi (0.24 km)	25 yd (23 m)	Brief tornado damaged a barn, with debris from the structure being driven into the ground. Many trees were snapped in a nearby grove as well.
EF2	NE of West Union	Adams	OH	38.81°N 83.52°W	2233	11.1 mi (17.9 km)	330 yd (300 m)	1 death – Five mobile homes were destroyed and two frame homes were damaged. Dozens of cattle were killed, and power transmission poles were knocked over. Many trees were snapped and uprooted along the path. Two people were injured.
EF3	SW of Mariba, KY to West Liberty to E of Ranger, WV	Menifee (KY), Morgan (KY), Johnson (KY), Lawrence (KY), Wayne (WV), Lincoln (WV)	KY, WV	37.91°N 83.61°W	2239	84.99 mi (136.78 km)	1,580 yd (1,440 m)	10 deaths – See article on this tornado. 118 people were injured.
EF0	Otway	Scioto	OH	38.85°N 83.21°W	2246	2.05 mi (3.30 km)	100 yd (91 m)	Tornado damaged two homes and a fire station were damaged in Otway. Numerous trees were snapped outside of town as well.
EF0	NE of Rarden	Scioto, Pike	OH	38.96°N 83.21°W	2246	4.15 mi (6.68 km)	200 yd (180 m)	A mobile home sustained significant damage and numerous trees were snapped and uprooted.
EF0	ENE of Dayton	Rhea	TN	35.49°N 85.01°W	2252	2.6 mi (4.2 km)	75 yd (69 m)	A shed was destroyed, four barns were damaged, and trees were downed.
EF0	SW of Piketon	Pike	OH	39.00°N 83.10°W	2253	2.8 mi (4.5 km)	100 yd (91 m)	Numerous trees were snapped and uprooted. One tree fell upon a mobile home, severely damaging it.
EF0	W of Brooklyn	Coffee	AL	31.31°N 86.19°W	2301	0.46 mi (740 m)	25 yd (23 m)	Brief tornado caused no damage.
EF1	SW of Owingsville to NW of Salt Lick	Bath	KY	38.14°N 83.78°W	2308	7.4 mi (11.9 km)	250 yd (230 m)	Numerous trees were snapped or uprooted and several barns and residences were damaged.
EF1	N of Haletown (2nd tornado)	Marion	TN	35.05°N 85.54°W	2310	0.2 mi (0.32 km)	100 yd (91 m)	Brief tornado snapped trees and tree limbs. This tornado north of Haletown struck very close to the first one.
EF2	N of Cookeville	Jackson, Putnam, Overton	TN	36.28°N 85.57°W	2326	12.3 mi (19.8 km)	800 yd (730 m)	This large wedge tornado damaged or destroyed many outbuildings, homes, and mobile homes along its path. Hundreds of trees and power lines were downed, and 20 people were injured.
EF3	W of Salyersville, KY to SE of Kermit, WV	Wolfe (KY), Magoffin (KY), Johnson (KY), Martin (KY), Mingo (WV)	KY, WV	37.70°N 83.27°W	2350	49.2 mi (79.2 km)	1,207 yd (1,104 m)	2 deaths – See section on this tornado. 37 people were injured.
EF0	SW of Jamestown	Fentress	TN	36.38°N 85.10°W	2356	6.42 mi (10.33 km)	300 yd (270 m)	Dozens of trees were downed across very mountainous terrain.
EF2	NW of East Bernstadt	Laurel	KY	37.20°N 84.21°W	0004	7.15 mi (11.51 km)	310 yd (280 m)	6 deaths – Numerous mobile homes were completely destroyed, and several other homes and mobile homes were damaged. An RV dealership was severely impacted, with multiple metal industrial buildings destroyed, along with many recreational vehicles. Large trees were snapped and uprooted, vehicles were moved and damaged, and outbuildings were destroyed as well. All deaths occurred in mobile homes, and 40 other people were injured.
EF0	NNE of Dundee	Geneva	AL	31.13°N 85.67°W	0017	0.1 mi (0.16 km)	30 yd (27 m)	Brief tornado touchdown in a peanut field caused no damage.
EF1	NE of Baxterville to NE of Purvis	Lamar, Forrest	MS	31.08°N 89.59°W	0023	12 mi (19 km)	300 yd (270 m)	This tornado impacted the northwestern fringes of Purvis, causing minor tree damage at that location. Elsewhere along the path, multiple mobile homes were blown off their foundations and heavily damaged, and a large storage shed also sustained major damage. Frame homes sustained roof and siding damage and many trees were snapped along the path, one of which fell onto a house.
EF1	SE of Midkiff to NE of Alkol	Lincoln	WV	38.15°N 82.16°W	0032	16 mi (26 km)	300 yd (270 m)	Trees and a few homes were damaged along the path.
EF2	Kildeer Mountain to E of Murphy	Cherokee	NC	35.27°N 82.65°W	0044	21.5 mi (34.6 km)	400 yd (370 m)	This tornado caused heavy damage in the northern part of Murphy, where a feed store and two rows of commercial storage units were destroyed. A shopping plaza and a paint store sustained heavy damage as well, and sheet metal was wrapped around trees. A total of 118 structures were damaged along the path, including five homes or mobile homes and five businesses that were destroyed. Many trees were snapped and uprooted as well.
EF3	NW of Buchanan to Dallas	Haralson, Paulding	GA	33.87°N 85.30°W	0109	29 mi (47 km)	200 yd (180 m)	Near Buchanan, this high-end EF3 tornado caused a home to collapse into its basement, injuring one person inside. A nearby repair shop was destroyed, and a church had its steeple blown off. Further along the path near Dallas, numerous homes were damaged or destroyed, a hangar at an airport was destroyed along with 19 planes inside, and a church had its roof ripped off. An elementary school sustained major roof damage and had an exterior wall blown out, with six nearby portable classrooms destroyed. An RV was overturned and a box truck was impaled by a wooden 2x4. Less intense damage occurred in Dallas before the tornado dissipated, though many trees in town were snapped and uprooted and some landed on homes. A total of 10 homes were destroyed, 58 were moderately damaged, and 92 others sustained minor damage in or near Dallas. Numerous trees and power lines were downed along the path.
EF2	Northern Harrogate	Claiborne	TN	36.58°N 83.64°W	0123	2.6 mi (4.2 km)	250 yd (230 m)	Several houses in the northern part of Harrogate sustained major roof damage and others lost their roofs entirely. Many trees were snapped and uprooted, fences were downed, and sheds were destroyed.
EF1	NW of Union, TN to SW of Ewing, VA	Claiborne (TN), Lee (VA)	TN, VA	36.63°N 83.43°W	0145	5 mi (8.0 km)	200 yd (180 m)	A few homes were heavily damaged or destroyed, with many others suffering minor damage. Numerous outbuildings were damaged or destroyed and trees were uprooted. Miles of agricultural fencing was destroyed and one person was injured.
EF0	Lake Glenville	Jackson	NC	35.18°N 83.19°W	0204	1.75 mi (2.82 km)	100 yd (91 m)	Numerous trees were snapped and uprooted, with one falling on a house. A church and a few homes had shingle damage as well.
EF1	SE of Jonesville	Lee	VA	36.66°N 83.08°W	0210	1 mi (1.6 km)	100 yd (91 m)	A mobile home was moved 15 feet (4.6 m) off of its foundation, a camper was rolled 40 yards (37 m), and several outbuildings were destroyed.
EF1	Eastern Marietta	Cobb	GA	33.97°N 84.45°W	0214	1 mi (1.6 km)	150 yd (140 m)	A daycare center and several homes had roof damage, and many trees were snapped or uprooted.
EF0	N of Farragut	Knox	TN	35.92°N 84.17°W	0233	0.31 mi (0.50 km)	70 yd (64 m)	Brief tornado downed a few trees.
EF0	S of Mascot	Knox	TN	36.02°N 83.77°W	0300	2.1 mi (3.4 km)	100 yd (91 m)	Tornado pushed a mobile home over onto its side and caused sporadic tree damage.
EF1	NE of Suttle to NE of Vine Hill	Perry, Dallas, Autauga	AL	32.54°N 87.15°W	0315	18.99 mi (30.56 km)	750 yd (690 m)	Tornado moved through sparsely populated areas, downing thousands of trees. Shingles and windows were damaged at the Paul M. Grist State Park park center building. Hunting camp trailers were destroyed, and a brick home sustained minor damage as well.
EF2	SW of Verbena to NE of Nixburg	Chilton, Coosa	AL	32.72°N 86.56°W	0401	28.58 mi (46.00 km)	700 yd (640 m)	This tornado passed just south of Verbena, damaging or destroying 13 homes and mobile homes, along with several outbuildings. Damage along the rest of the path was limited to snapped trees.
EF2	W of Wind Creek State Park to W of Five Points	Tallapoosa, Chambers	AL	32.87°N 85.97°W	0440	34.26 mi (55.14 km)	1,000 yd (910 m)	1 death – This large multiple-vortex tornado crossed Lake Martin near the beginning of its path before passing near Jackson's Gap, Eagle Creek, and Trammel Crossroads. Several homes sustained significant damage, and multiple mobile homes were completely destroyed. One mobile home frame was wrapped completely around a tree trunk. Thousands of trees were snapped and uprooted along the path, and two other people were injured.
EF0	NNE of Carson	Jefferson Davis	MS	31.59°N 89.76°W	0547	0.25 mi (0.40 km)	50 yd (46 m)	A mobile home's porch was destroyed, and another mobile home was knocked off its piers. A few trees were snapped and uprooted.

=== March 3 event ===
List of confirmed tornadoes – Saturday, March 3, 2012
EF#	Location	County / Parish	State	Start Coord.	Time (UTC)	Path length	Max width	Summary
EF2	Charlotte to Harrisburg	Mecklenburg, Cabarrus	NC	35.257°N 80.687°W	07:35–7:39	2.94 mi (4.73 km)	200 yd (180 m)	Nearly 200 homes were damaged in residential areas of Charlotte and Harrisburg as a result of this strong early morning tornado, including a few frail homes that slid off of their foundations and collapsed. Vehicles were flipped, trees were downed, and sheds were destroyed as well. Four people were injured, including a child who was thrown from his home across Interstate 485.
EF0	Northern Columbia	Richland	SC	34.072°N 81.076°W	10:35–10:38	2.54 mi (4.09 km)	80 yd (73 m)	Weak tornado downed trees and tree branches, some of which landed on a mobile home.
EF0	ENE of Colquitt	Miller	GA	31.1964°N 84.683°W	12:15–12:17	0.3 mi (0.48 km)	25 yd (23 m)	Several trees were snapped and a home suffered roof damage and had its front porch torn off.
EF0	SSW of Vada	Decatur	GA	31.05°N 84.43°W	13:30–13:35	3.27 mi (5.26 km)	25 yd (23 m)	Tornado destroyed a home's attached garage, a camper, and multiple sheds. A car and irrigation pivots were also overturned.
EF0	S of Quincy	Gadsden	FL	30.4738°N 84.6159°W	14:25–14:26	0.55 mi (0.89 km)	25 yd (23 m)	About two dozen trees were downed in a rural area.
EF3	NW of Moody Air Force Base to Lakeland	Lowndes, Lanier	GA	31.008°N 83.2517°W	17:56–18:10	10.45 mi (16.82 km)	390 yd (360 m)	Near Moody Air Force Base, this wedge tornado caused EF2 damage as frame homes were damaged and pushed off of their foundations, a mobile home was destroyed with debris scattered downwind, a tree was ripped out of the ground by its roots and thrown, and a silo was destroyed. Other homes in this area sustained minor damage, while a shed was destroyed and a camper was flipped as well. Further along the path, EF3 damage occurred as trees sustained almost complete debarking, ground scouring and deep gouging marks were noted, shrubbery and an electric meter was ripped out of the ground, a mobile home was totally obliterated to its site being unrecognizable, a mower and a propane tank were thrown for hundreds of yards, and a large shed structure was swept away. Projectiles were driven deeply into the ground along this segment of the path, a small grain silo was destroyed, a house at the edge of the damage path had roof and window damage, and a wooden 2x4 was speared into a metal trailer. The tornado weakened and struck Lakeland before dissipating, where another mobile home was destroyed, a full shipping container was rolled 50 ft (15 m), a hospital sustained damage to its rooftop antennas and air conditioning units. The hospital's ambulance station was also damaged, and a nearby trailer was moved. Many trees and power poles were snapped along the path.

=== March 9 event ===
List of reported tornadoes - Friday, March 9, 2012
EF#	Location	County	Coord.	Time (UTC)	Path length	Comments/Damage
Hawaii
EF0	ESE of Kailua	Honolulu	21.40°N 157.72°W	0910	1.5 miles (2.4 km)	Tornado started as a waterspout that moved ashore. Roofs were damaged, signs and power lines were knocked down, and trees were snapped.
Sources: NWS Honolulu

=== March 11 event ===
List of reported tornadoes - Sunday, March 11, 2012
EF#	Location	County	Coord.	Time (UTC)	Path length	Comments/Damage
Texas
EF0	NW of San Augustine	San Augustine	31.56°N 94.15°W	1920	4 miles (6.4 km)	A large tree was uprooted, large tree limbs were broken, and metal was peeled from a chicken house.
Louisiana
EF0	W of Oak Grove	West Carroll	32.86°N 91.49°W	0057	2.6 miles (4.2 km)	Multiple trees were snapped or uprooted, and one manufactured home was damaged by a falling tree.
EF0	NE of Jennings	Acadia	30.27°N 92.62°W	0402	1.5 miles (2.4 km)	Several trees were snapped or uprooted, and one home lost a significant number of shingles. Three other homes received minor roof damage. A barn had a wall blown out, and an unsecured storage building was flipped and destroyed.
Sources: SPC Storm Reports for 03/11/12, NWS Shreveport, LA, NWS Jackson, MS, NWS Lake Charles, LA

=== March 12 event ===
List of reported tornadoes - Monday, March 12, 2012
EF#	Location	County	Coord.	Time (UTC)	Path length	Comments/Damage
Michigan
EF1	SSE of Coleman	Midland	43.71°N 84.57°W	2243	5.1 miles (8.2 km)	A garage was destroyed and three pole barns were damaged. Trees were uprooted
Sources: SPC Storm Reports for 03/12/12, NWS Detroit

=== March 15 event ===
List of confirmed tornadoes – Thursday, March 15, 2012 (Note: All dates are based on the local time zone where the tornado touched down; however, all times are in Coordinated Universal Time for consistency.)
EF#	Location	County / Parish	State	Start Coord.	Time (UTC)	Path length	Max width	Summary
EF3	Dexter	Washtenaw	MI	42.39°N 83.96°W	21:18–21:56	7.6 miles (12.2 km)	800 yd (730 m)	About a dozen houses were destroyed along a damage path 800 yards (730 m) wide through town. One poorly anchored home was leveled, with a hundred homes and businesses suffering varying degrees of damage in Dexter. This would be the last intense tornado in the state in over 10 years, until a deadly EF3 tornado impacted Gaylord, on May 20, 2022.
EF2	SSW of Columbiaville	Lapeer	MI	43.12°N 83.42°W	22:49–23:04	4.5 miles (7.2 km)	400 yd (370 m)	Trees were uprooted, one house was shifted off of its foundation and heavily damaged, and a garage was destroyed.
EF0	S of Ida	Monroe	MI	41.87°N 83.56°W	22:51	0.5 miles (0.80 km)	50 yd (46 m)	Trees were downed, shingles were blown off a roof, a shed was destroyed, and a car was flipped.

=== March 17 event ===
List of reported tornadoes - Saturday, March 17, 2012
EF#	Location	County	Coord.	Time (UTC)	Path length	Comments/Damage
California
EF0	WSW of Tranquility	Fresno	36.63°N 120.32°W	2230	unknown	No damage was reported.
Sources: SPC Storm Reports for 03/17/12, NWS San Joaquin Valley, CA: ,

=== March 18 event ===
List of reported tornadoes - Sunday, March 18, 2012
EF#	Location	County	Coord.	Time (UTC)	Path length	Comments/Damage
Oklahoma
EF0	W of Mangum	Greer	34.88°N 99.68°W	2350	3.85 miles (6.20 km)	No damage reported with this tornado.
EF0	WSW of Brinkman	Greer	34.96°N 99.60°W	0010	0.1 miles (160 m)	No damage reported with this tornado.
EF0	WNW of Willow	Greer	35.07°N 99.56°W	0027	1.4 miles (2.3 km)	No damage reported with this tornado.
EF0	NW of Willow	Greer	35.10°N 99.57°W	0037	1 mile (1.6 km)	No damage reported. This tornado was from the same supercell that produced the other tornadoes in Greer County.
Nebraska
EF3	SW of North Platte	Lincoln	41.09°N 100.83°W	0210	6.7 miles (10.8 km)	Two homes were damaged and a large metal truss tower was destroyed. Outbuildings are garages were destroyed or damaged, two irrigation pivots were overturned, and a wooden transmission tower was destroyed. Extensive tree and power line damage occurred along the path. Two people were injured.
EF1	WSW of North Platte	Lincoln	41.12°N 100.86°W	0213	1.5 miles (2.4 km)	A semi-truck and fence line were destroyed. A garage was damaged and an irrigation pivot was destroyed. Extensive tree damage occurred, debris was scattered through fields, and one person was injured.
EF3	NW of North Platte (1st tornado)	Lincoln	41.13°N 100.85°W	0214	1.7 miles (2.7 km)	Two homes were destroyed and two others suffered significant damage. Debris from impacted structures was scattered up to a mile and a half away. Fifteen train cars and an irrigation pivot were overturned. Two people were injured.
EF2	NW of North Platte (2nd tornado)	Lincoln	41.17°N 100.87°W	0218	1.7 miles (2.7 km)	Two homes were heavily damaged and a barn was destroyed, with debris from the barn driven into the ground. Garages and outbuildings were damaged or destroyed, and extensive tree damage occurred.
EF0	SSE of Ringgold	McPherson	41.44°N 100.77°W	0239	5.3 miles (8.5 km)	A church and a small storage building were damaged, and a pivot irrigation system was twisted and overturned. Trees were uprooted and limbs were snapped as well.
EF0	NNW of Valentine	Cherry	42.92°N 100.59°W	0319	100 yards (91 m)	Brief touchdown with no damage.
Sources: SPC Storm Reports for 03/18/12, NWS Norman, OK, NWS North Platte, NE

=== March 19 event ===
List of reported tornadoes - Monday, March 19, 2012
EF#	Location	County	Coord.	Time (UTC)	Path length	Comments/Damage
Texas
EF2	Gardendale	Ector	32.03°N 102.34°W	0628	1 mile (1.6 km)	A camper was flipped, a cinder block fence was toppled, and a barn and trailer were destroyed. One house in Gardendale suffered significant roof damage and was shifted off of its foundation, and several power poles were damaged. A horse trailer and a cotton trailer were tossed, and a travel trailer was destroyed. Large amounts of debris was scattered throughout the area, some of which was speared into the walls of adjacent structures. Three people were injured.
EF2	WNW of Devine	Medina	29.14°N 98.94°W	0106	3.5 miles (5.6 km)	A semi-trailer was overturned and a mobile home was destroyed. Multiple permanent homes had roofs torn off or sustained major structural damage. A metal storage shed was largely destroyed, and trees and power lines were downed. 14 homes were destroyed, 11 sustained major damage, and 7 others sustained minor damage.
EF1	W of Lytle	Medina	29.18°N 98.84°W	0120	7 miles (11 km)	Power lines were knocked down and an RV was flipped.
EF2	ENE of Lytle to E of LaCoste	Bexar	29.24°N 98.76°W	0130	5 miles (8.0 km)	This strong tornado destroyed four frame homes and four mobile homes. Five other homes were severely damaged, and two others sustained minor damage. Four people were injured.
Kansas
EF0	ESE of Montrose	Jewell	39.77°N 98.04°W	1055	0.8 miles (1.3 km)	A large machine shed was destroyed.
Minnesota
EF0	S of Elysian	Waseca, Le Sueur	44.17°N 93.68°W	2325	7 miles (11 km)	Numerous trees and several structures were damaged along the path. Homes sustained roof damage, a metal shed was destroyed, and boat docks were lifted and thrown at Lake Francis.
Oklahoma
EF0	NW of Vian	Sequoyah	35.52°N 95.00°W	0120	0.1 miles (160 m)	Brief tornado remained over open country, causing no damage.
Arkansas
EF1	SW of Uniontown to WSW of Chester	Crawford	35.58°N 94.44°W	0252	13 miles (21 km)	The roof of a mobile home was damaged, and numerous trees were snapped or uprooted.
EF0	Fayetteville	Washington	36.09°N 94.14°W	0320	1 mile (1.6 km)	Several homes and a Walmart in town sustained damage, and a few trees and tree limbs were snapped.
Sources: SPC Storm Reports for 03/19/12, NWS Odessa, TX, NWS San Antonio, TX, NWS Tulsa, OK

=== March 20 event ===
List of reported tornadoes - Tuesday, March 20, 2012
EF#	Location	County	Coord.	Time (UTC)	Path length	Comments/Damage
Texas
EF0	E of San Antonio International Airport	Bexar	29.54°N 98.41°W	0555	0.75 miles (1.21 km)	A post office and 10 homes suffered minor damage, with another home suffering major damage. Fences and vegetation sustained damage as well.
EF0	Kirby	Bexar	29.49°N 98.38°W	0559	0.25 miles (400 m)	A few homes sustained minor damage, along with fences and vegetation.
EF0	Runge	Karnes	28.88°N 97.72°W	0905	0.25 miles (400 m)	Houses and outbuildings in Runge suffered minor damage. A few trees were downed as well.
Louisiana
EF0	E of Zwolle	Sabine	31.64°N 93.56°W	1636	3 miles (4.8 km)	Several trees were snapped and uprooted and a few power lines were downed.
EF0	SE of Goldonna	Natchitoches, Winn	32.00°N 92.89°W	1815	2.1 miles (3.4 km)	Several trees were snapped or blown down, some of which landed on railroad tracks. Power lines were also downed.
EF0	E of Natchitoches	Natchitoches	31.76°N 93.06°W	0228	1 mile (1.6 km)	Three mobile homes sustained damage, one with moderate roof damage. One tree was snapped as well.
Sources: SPC Storm Reports for 03/20/12, NWS Shreveport, LA

=== March 21 event ===
List of reported tornadoes - Wednesday, March 21, 2012
EF#	Location	County	Coord.	Time (UTC)	Path length	Comments/Damage
Louisiana
EF0	S of Sikes	Winn	32.05°N 92.49°W	0814	0.4 miles (0.64 km)	A few trees were snapped.
EF1	Lake Arthur	Jefferson Davis	30.08°N 92.68°W	0930	2 miles (3.2 km)	An estimated 30 to 40 homes were damaged, barns were destroyed, trees we’re downed, and an antenna was blown off the top of a water tower in town.
EF2	Gueydan	Vermilion	30.01°N 92.51°W	0945	2.5 miles (4.0 km)	A tied-down mobile home in Gueydan was rolled upside down and completely destroyed. Five homes and city hall sustained significant roof damage. About 20 more homes received minor damage, and grave stones were blown over at a local cemetery. Several outbuildings were destroyed and numerous trees were downed. One minor injury occurred.
EF0	W of Henry	Vermilion	29.88°N 92.10°W	1035	1 mile (1.6 km)	Damage consisted of a roof blown off of a barn, several outbuildings damaged, and several trees snapped.
EF1	E of Abbeville	Vermilion	29.97°N 92.12°W	1045	1.5 miles (2.4 km)	A garage and a portable building were destroyed, and trees and telephone poles were snapped.
EF0	Patterson	St. Mary	29.69°N 91.31°W	1257	1 mile (1.6 km)	A large industrial building had its garage doors blown in, and sheet metal was removed from other buildings and scattered throughout the area.
EF1	N of Clarks	Caldwell	32.05°N 92.15°W	1330	4.1 miles (6.6 km)	Twenty homes were damaged, while one mobile home and several outbuildings were destroyed. Many trees were snapped or uprooted.
EF1	Prairieville	Ascension	30.30°N 90.97°W	1434	3 miles (4.8 km)	Several homes in town sustained significant roof damage, and numerous trees were snapped or uprooted by this high-end EF1 tornado.
EF1	E of Kleinpeter	East Baton Rouge	30.34°N 90.94°W	1443	0.6 miles (0.97 km)	Several homes suffered roof damage and numerous trees were downed.
EF1	NE of Corbin	Livingston	30.53°N 90.83°W	1505	0.6 miles (0.97 km)	Several trees were downed, and a house lost part of its roof.
EF0	NE of Madisonville	St. Tammany	30.43°N 90.13°W	1716	0.5 miles (0.80 km)	Brief tornado caused minor damage to two homes and downed trees.
EF0	NE of Abita Springs	St. Tammany	30.49°N 90.02°W	1735	1.4 miles (2.3 km)	Several trees were downed, one of which fell through the roof of a house.
North Carolina
EF0	ENE of Wenona	Washington	35.73°N 76.63°W	1500	100 yards (91 m)	Brief tornado remained over an open field and caused no damage.
Mississippi
EF1	E of McNair	Jefferson	31.64°N 91.02°W	1523	3 miles (4.8 km)	Numerous trees were snapped or uprooted along the path.
EF2	NNE of Port Gibson	Claiborne, Warren	32.09°N 90.99°W	1551	10 miles (16 km)	Two mobile homes were destroyed and four power poles were snapped. A brick home sustained major roof damage, and three large outbuildings were destroyed. Numerous trees were snapped or uprooted, one of which landed on a house and caused significant damage.
EF1	SE of Vicksburg	Warren	32.30°N 90.86°W	1611	1.75 miles (2.82 km)	A building had its metal roof peeled back, while a trailer and a mobile home were overturned. Many trees were downed, some of which landed on homes.
EF2	WSW of Pelahatchie	Rankin	32.29°N 89.84°W	1904	6.3 miles (10.1 km)	Narrow but strong tornado tore much of the roof from a large home and partially collapsed the back exterior wall. Many large trees were snapped and uprooted along the path.
EF0	SE of Eastabuchie	Forrest	31.42°N 89.25°W	2100	0.3 miles (0.48 km)	Brief tornado snapped several trees, one of which fell on and destroyed a fence. Shingles were torn off of a home.
EF0	SW of Soso	Jones	31.73°N 89.33°W	2231	0.2 miles (0.32 km)	Brief tornado heavily damaged the roof of a chicken house and uprooted a tree.
EF0	NW of Long Beach	Harrison	30.48°N 89.31°W	0132	0.25 miles (0.40 km)	Brief tornado damaged a trailer.
EF0	ESE of Paulding	Jasper	32.02°N 89.02°W	0203	0.5 miles (0.80 km)	Brief tornado uprooted several trees.
EF1	NNE of Gulfport	Harrison	30.59°N 88.97°W	0535	1 mile (1.6 km)	A trailer was flipped and several homes lost part of their roofs. Trees were damaged as well.
Sources: SPC Storm Reports for 03/20/12, SPC Storm Reports for 03/21/12, NWS Shreveport, LA, NWS Lake Charles, LA, NWS Newport / Morehead City, NC, NWS Jackson, MS

=== March 22 event ===
List of reported tornadoes - Thursday, March 22, 2012
EF#	Location	County	Coord.	Time (UTC)	Path length	Comments/Damage
Mississippi
EF0	N of Biloxi	Harrison	30.49°N 88.93°W	1010	4.1 miles (6.6 km)	A large shed had its door blown in and sustained roof damage. Several residences sustained fence and shingle damage, and a patio roof was lifted off.
Sources: SPC Storm Reports for 03/21/12

=== March 23 event ===
List of reported tornadoes - Friday, March 23, 2012
EF#	Location	County	Coord.	Time (UTC)	Path length	Comments/Damage
Alabama
EF1	NNW of Troy	Pike	31.83°N 86.04°W	1426	1.7 miles (2.7 km)	Several trees and tree limbs were snapped or uprooted. Two houses, three chicken barns, and a single-wide manufactured home also sustained damage.
EF0	NW of Malvern	Geneva	31.15°N 85.56°W	1748	1.7 miles (2.7 km)	A few houses suffered minor roof damage and several trees were downed.
Missouri
EF0	Cape Girardeau	Cape Girardeau	37.33°N 89.50°W	1633	0.25 miles (400 m)	Brief tornado caused roof damage to several homes in a neighborhood and downed a few small trees.
EF1	NW of Neely's Landing	Cape Girardeau	37.52°N 89.52°W	1638	0.6 miles (0.97 km)	Trees and power lines were downed by this brief tornado.
Illinois
EF0	E of Murphysboro	Jackson	37.76°N 89.27°W	1714	1.8 miles (2.9 km)	A few trees and tree limbs were downed along the path.
EF1	NW of Desoto	Jackson	37.85°N 89.27°W	1724	7.5 miles (12.1 km)	Dozens of trees were uprooted or snapped, and homes sustained roof and siding damage. Several sheds, barns, and carports were damaged, and a flag pole was blown down.
EF2	NW of Opdyke	Jefferson	38.26°N 88.79°W	1826	2.5 miles (4.0 km)	1 death – A tied-down double-wide mobile home was thrown 100 feet (30 m) and obliterated by this high-end EF2 tornado, killing one person inside and injuring two others. The metal undercarriage was found 200 yards (180 m) away from where it originated. A house had its windows blown out, and trees were snapped and uprooted. Three barns were also damaged, one heavily.
EF0	NNE of Kell	Marion	38.53°N 88.88°W	1857	100 yards (91 m)	Brief touchdown caused no damage.
Kentucky
EF1	Heritage Creek	Jefferson	38.09°N 85.62°W	1807	2.5 miles (4.0 km)	This high-end EF1 tornado caused considerable damage in suburban areas of southeastern Louisville. A frail modular home sustained collapse of its first floor, causing it to pancake underneath the second floor. Another home had its roof blown off, while numerous other homes sustained roof, window, and siding damage.
EF1	E of Finchville	Shelby	38.15°N 85.29°W	1828	2.25 miles (3.62 km)	Two barns were destroyed and a trailer was overturned. Two more barns lost their roofs, with metal debris from one of them scattered through fields and into trees. Dozens of trees were snapped or uprooted as well.
Georgia
EF0	S of Kolomoki Mounds State Park	Early	31.43°N 84.95°W	2020	3.6 miles (5.8 km)	Several trees were downed and a few structures sustained minor roof damage.
Indiana
EF0	WNW of Center Square	Switzerland	38.83°N 85.05°W	2039	unknown	Brief tornado remained over open country and caused no damage.
Ohio
EF0	NE of Butlerville	Warren	39.32°N 84.07°W	2330	0.5 miles (0.80 km)	A pole barn sustained severe damage, with debris scattered up to a quarter-mile away. Debris from the pole barn was driven into the roof of a house, a second barn also sustained damage, and trees were snapped or uprooted.
EF0	Clarksville	Clinton	39.39°N 83.98°W	2350	0.3 miles (0.48 km)	Brief tornado touched down in Clarksville, where homes sustained roof damage and had windows blown out. Fences and play sets were blown over, and trees were snapped or uprooted.
Sources: SPC Storm Reports for 03/23/12, NWS Louisville, NWS Birmingham, NWS Paducah, KY, NWS Wilmington, OH

=== March 24 event ===
List of reported tornadoes - Saturday, March 24, 2012
EF#	Location	County	Coord.	Time (UTC)	Path length	Comments/Damage
Florida
EF0	Alachua	Alachua	29.75°N 82.56°W	1840	4.6 miles (7.4 km)	Two homes and a carport were damaged, and trees were snapped.
Sources: SPC Storm Reports for 03/24/12, NCDC Storm Events Database

=== March 28 event ===
List of reported tornadoes - Wednesday, March 28, 2012
EF#	Location	County	Coord.	Time (UTC)	Path length	Comments/Damage
Kansas
EF0	SSW of Allen	Lyon	38.55°N 96.21°W	0132	0.1 miles (160 m)	Very brief touchdown with no damage.
EF0	S of Madison	Greenwood	38.08°N 96.13°W	0137	0.25 miles (400 m)	Very brief touchdown with no damage.
EF0	ESE of Madison	Greenwood	38.11°N 96.07°W	0217	0.25 miles (400 m)	Very brief touchdown with no damage.
Sources: SPC Storm Reports for 03/28/12, NCDC Storm Events Database

=== March 30 event ===
List of reported tornadoes - Friday, March 30, 2012
EF#	Location	County	Coord.	Time (UTC)	Path length	Comments/Damage
Florida
EF0	WSW of Vicksburg	Bay	30.30°N 85.75°W	2052	0.2 miles (320 m)	Waterspout moved onshore and caused no damage.
Sources: SPC Storm Reports for 03/28/12, NCDC Storm Events Database

== See also ==
- Tornadoes of 2012
- List of United States tornadoes from January to February 2012
- List of United States tornadoes in April 2012
