= Duke School =

Duke School may refer to:

- Dukes Middle School, formerly Dukes Grammar School (Alnwick, Northumberland) England
- Duke School (Durham, North Carolina) USA
- Duke University (Durham, North Carolina) USA
- Schools in East Duke, Oklahoma USA
