= Ernest L. Massad =

United States Army general

Ernest Louis Massad
- Ernest L. "Iron Mike" Massad
- Born: December 25, 1908; Brinkman, Oklahoma
- Died: February 20, 1993 (aged 84); Oklahoma City, Oklahoma
- Military career
- Allegiance: United States of America
- Branch: United States Army
- Service years: 1933–1968
- Rank: Lieutenant General
- Nickname: Iron Mike
- Commands: 675th Glider Field Artillery Battalion
- Awards: Distinguished Service Medal; Silver Star; Legion of Merit; Bronze Star (OLC); Purple Heart; Silver Arrowhead; Presidential Unit Citation

Ernest Louis "Iron Mike" Massad (December 25, 1908 — February 20, 1993) was a college football star, major general of the U.S. Army, and successful oilman.

== Biography ==
Massad was born in 1908 in Brinkman, Oklahoma to a Lebanese family, Namey and Shafiga Kouri Massad, both from Jdeidet Marjayoun, modern-day Lebanon. After graduation from Ardmore High School, he enrolled in the University of Oklahoma in 1928. He starred in football, playing fullback, linebacker and kicker, and earned the nickname "Iron Mike" for his athletic ability. In 1956, he was chosen by Sports Illustrated magazine for inclusion in a set of "Men of Achievement" who had excelled at football in 1931, and in 1956 were "furnishing U.S. leadership in business, medicine, law, theology, diplomacy, teaching, coaching and the military."

Massad was a member of Reserve Officers' Training Corps from 1928 to 1932 and was commissioned as a Second Lieutenant in 1933. He married Mozelle Sockwell on January 30, 1939, in Shreveport, Louisiana, and had a son, Michael Louis, and a daughter, Elaine.

He was a member of the First Cavalry Division from 1940 to 1943. During World War II, he served in the 82nd Airborne Division and was promoted to battalion commander in the Eleventh Airborne Division, which fought in the Pacific Theater of Operations. He served as commander of the 675th Para-Glider Field Artillery Battalion and fought in the New Guinea campaign and the battles of Leyte and Luzon. He was promoted to colonel in 1945 and left active duty in 1946.

Massad moved to Ardmore, Oklahoma, where he re-joined the US Army Reserve. In January 1958 he was named assistant division commander of the 95th Infantry Division in January 1958 and was promoted to brigadier general in May 1959. He was promoted to major general on December 11, 1962, and left the Reserve in 1968.

He served as deputy assistant secretary of defense receiving his 3rd Star for reserve affairs in Washington D.C., appointed by President Lyndon B. Johnson. He served as chairman of the State of Oklahoma Fair Board and was inducted into the Oklahoma Hall of Fame. He was elected vice president of the Oklahoma Heritage Association on January 27, 1984.

In 1963 the Western Federation of American Syrian and Lebanese Clubs named Massad American Lebanese Man of the Year.

After military life, he was an independent operator of the E.L. "Mike" Massad Oil Company and a successful businessman in housing and real estate. He died on February 20, 1993, in an Oklahoma City hospital.

== Awards and decorations ==
Among Massad's service awards and decorations were the Army Distinguished Service Medal, Silver Star, Legion of Merit, Bronze Star with Oak Leaf Cluster, Purple Heart, Silver Arrowhead, and Presidential Unit Citation.

- Army Distinguished Service Medal
- Silver Star
- Legion of Merit
- Bronze Star with one Oak Leaf Cluster
- Purple Heart
- Army Presidential Unit Citation
