= Oklahoma State Highway 34 =

Highway in Oklahoma

State Highway 34

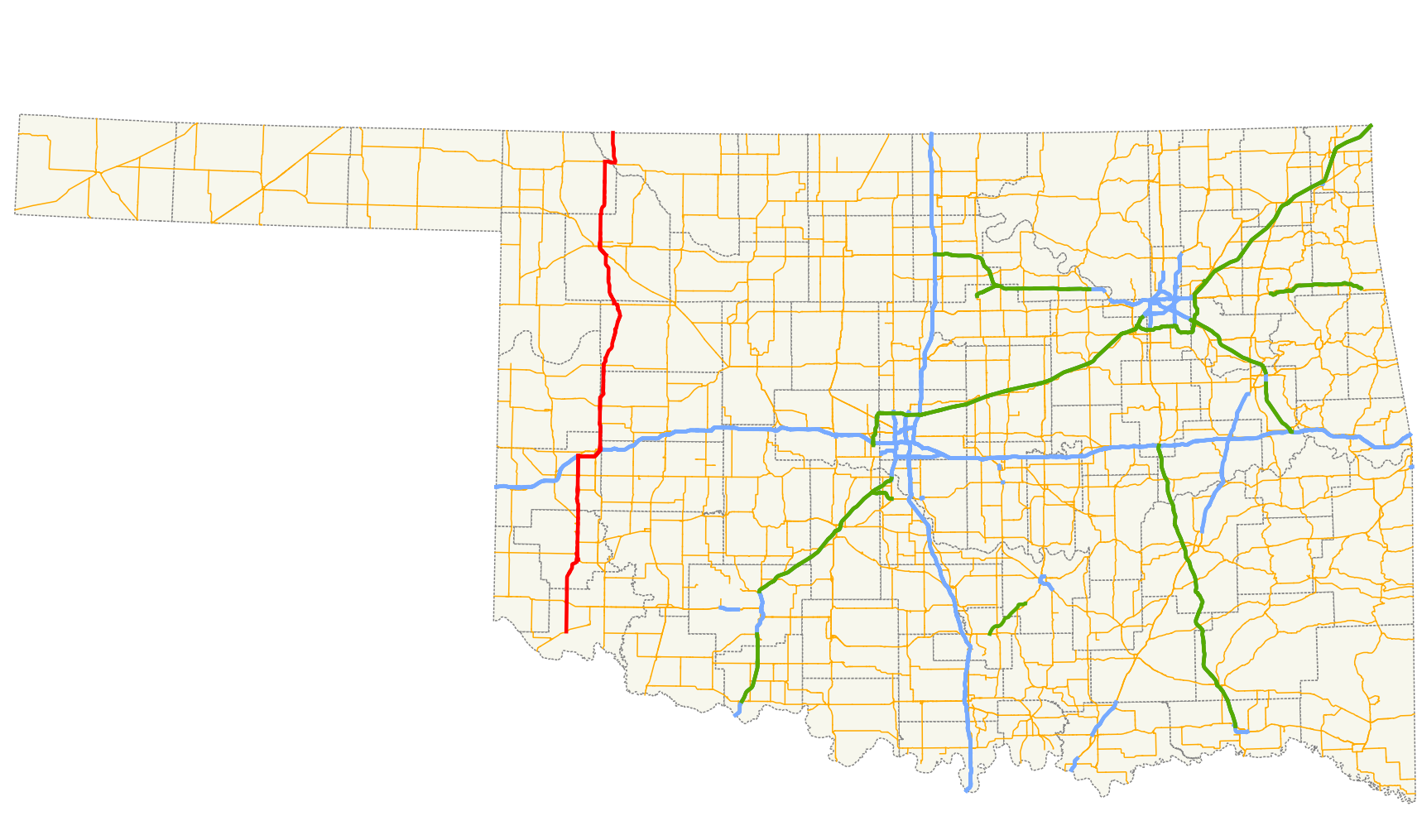

Route information
- Maintained by ODOT
- Length: 188.3 mi (303.0 km)
- Existed: June 15, 1931–present

Major junctions
- South end: SH-6 northeast of Eldorado
- US 62 in East Duke; US 283 in Mangum; I-40 at Elk City; US 60 / SH-51 at Vici; US 183 / US 270 / US 412 / SH-3 at Woodward; US 64 near Buffalo
- North end: K-1 at the Kansas state line near Buttermilk, KS

Location
- Country: United States
- State: Oklahoma

Highway system
- Oklahoma State Highway System; Interstate; US; State; Turnpikes
← SH-33	→ I-35

State Highway 34 (abbreviated SH-34) is a state highway in the U.S. state of Oklahoma. It runs for 188.3 miles (303.0 km) south-to-north in the western part of the state. The highway begins northeast of Eldorado, in the southwest corner of the state, and extends north to the Kansas state line between Woodward and Coldwater, Kansas.

SH-34 has always been a lengthy highway, starting with its commissioning in June 1931, when it was a border-to-border highway stretching from Texas to Kansas. Most of SH-34 has followed the same basic corridor since its inception, with the exception of the portion of highway north of Woodward. The southernmost portion of highway, connecting it to Texas, became solely SH-6 in 1987.

There are three letter-suffixed spur highways branching from SH-34. SH-34A and SH-34B serve small towns in Greer County off the mainline of SH-34, while SH-34C serves Boiling Springs State Park.

== Route description ==
For much of its extent, State Highway 34 passes through rural areas, running through the plains of western Oklahoma. The highway begins at SH-6 six miles (10 km) northeast of Eldorado. Heading north from there, it intersects U.S. Route 62 (US-62) just east of Duke. The highway continues north into Greer County to its county seat of Mangum, where SH-34 joins US-283. Two miles (3.2 km) north of Mangum, SH-9 joins for a four-mile (6 km) concurrency with SH-34 and US-283. Thereafter, SH-9 splits off to the east.

Nine miles (14 km) north of Mangum, SH-34B branches off to the west, connecting to the town of Brinkman, and four miles (6.4 km) later, SH-34A branches off to the west to the town of Willow. US-283 splits off to the northwest two miles (3.2 km) after that, and SH-34 continues north, crossing into Beckham County. SH-34 then bridges over the North Fork of the Red River. In Carter, the highway serves as the western terminus of SH-55. Five miles (8.0 km) north of Carter, SH-34 crosses SH-152.

SH-34 continues on to an interchange with Interstate 40 (I-40) west of Elk City. Here, the highway begins a concurrency with eastbound I-40. SH-34 accesses I-40 from exit 32, a partial diamond interchange, with no access to or from I-40 eastbound; the missing movements must be completed via another partial interchange further to the east, also numbered as exit 32, which serves Business I-40 (I-40 BUS). SH-34 follows I-40 to the east for 6 miles (9.7 km). While concurrent with I-40, SH-34 has an interchange with SH-6, its northernmost junction with the latter highway. SH-34 exits the interstate from the left at exit 41 on the east side of Elk City, turning back to the north and intersecting I-40 BUS. The highway continues north out of Elk City, exiting Beckham County.

After leaving Beckham County, SH-34 enters Roger Mills County. SH-73's western terminus is at SH-34 at nine miles (14 km) north of Elk City. North of this junction, SH-34 lies along the Roger Mills–Custer county line, which it continues to follow as it passes through the east side of Hammon, where it meets State Highway 33. North of town, the route crosses over the Washita River, and shortly thereafter turns northeast to fully enter Custer County. Northwest of Moorewood, the highway crosses into Dewey County.

In Dewey County, SH-34 crosses SH-47, two miles (3.2 km) south of Leedey, and crosses the Canadian River near the unincorporated settlement of Trail. The highway then passes through Camargo. Just east of Vici, SH-34 joins US-60 and SH-51 for a one-mile (1.6 km) concurrency, then SH-34 heads north again at Vici. The highway passes through Sharon north of Vici, then joins US-183/US-270/SH-3 four miles (6.4 km) southeast of Woodward. At Woodward, SH-34 again sets off to the north alone, and right after crossing the North Canadian River, SH-34C branches to the east about two miles (3.2 km) north of Woodward, connecting to Boiling Springs State Park.

SH-34 joins US-64 in far eastern Harper County for a four-mile (6 km) concurrency to the east, crossing the Cimarron River 17 miles (27 km) east of Buffalo. The highway then turns back to the north, where it is 10 miles (20 km) to its terminus at the Kansas state line.

== History ==
State Highway 34 was first designated on June 15, 1931. At that time, the highway began at the free bridge over the Red River north of Quanah, Texas, and followed what is today SH-6 to the point that is now SH-34's southern terminus. There, it turned north, following its current alignment. Its 1931 alignment did not differ significantly from that of the present day (although it followed US-66 through Elk City prior to the establishment of I-40) until it got to Woodward. Rather than continue north out of town, the SH-34 of that day instead turned west, then north, passing through Fort Supply and crossing into Harper County just north of that town. It then began a concurrency with US-60 in Buffalo, turning east and connecting with its final segment, bringing it to the Kansas state line. Thus, SH-34 started life as a border-to-border highway.

SH-34 was rerouted north of Buffalo on January 30, 1934. The new alignment continued due north out of Buffalo to the Kansas state line along a new road. The old portion of SH-34 between US-64 and the Kansas state line became part of SH-50.

The next major change to SH-34 occurred in 1954. On November 1 of that year, the highway was realigned to follow a new road extending north of Woodward, intersecting US-64 east of Buffalo, and following existing highways north to the state line. This would put SH-34 on its present-day route north of Woodward. SH-50 would remain concurrent with SH-34 north of US-64 until November 9, 1964.

The next major change to SH-34 would be brought about by the establishment of the southern part of State Highway 6. The new highway was introduced on July 7, 1975. SH-34 remained in place; the two highways were concurrent from northwest of Eldorado to the Red River bridge, where they both ended. On January 5, 1987, the redundant section of SH-34 was removed, truncating it to its current southern terminus.

The final modification to SH-34 occurred just under a month later, on February 2, 1987, when SH-34 was realigned in Elk City to follow I-40 instead of the old alignment of the now-dead US-66, which had become a business loop of I-40. No further changes have taken place since then.

== Junction list ==
County	Location	mi	km	Exit	Destinations	Notes
Jackson		0.0	0.0		SH-6	Southern terminus
Jackson	Duke	10.5	16.9		US 62	
Greer	Mangum	26.4	42.5		US 283	Southern end of US-283 concurrency
Greer		28.3	45.5		SH-9	Southern end of SH-9 concurrency
Greer		32.3	52.0		SH-9	Northern end of SH-9 concurrency
Greer		35.8	57.6		SH-34B	Eastern terminus of SH-34B
Greer		38.7	62.3		SH-34A	Eastern terminus of SH-34A
Greer		40.5	65.2		US 283	Northern end of US-283 concurrency
Beckham	Carter	50.4	81.1		SH-55	Western terminus of SH-55
Beckham		55.4	89.2		SH-152	
Beckham		62.1	99.9		I-40	Western end of I-40 concurrency, I-40 exit 32
Beckham	Elk City	63.9	102.8	34	Merritt Road	
Beckham	Elk City	67.8	109.1	38	SH-6	
Beckham	Elk City	69.5	111.8	40	East 7th Street	
Beckham	Elk City	70.2	113.0		I-40	Eastern end of I-40 concurrency, exit 41
Beckham	Elk City	70.7	113.8		I-40 BL	
Roger Mills–Custer county line		79.7	128.3		SH-73	Western terminus of SH-73
Roger Mills–Custer county line	Hammon	85.7	137.9		SH-33	
Custer	No major junctions					
Dewey		100.1	161.1		SH-47	
Dewey	Vici	122.6	197.3		US 60 / SH-51	Eastern end of US-60/SH-51 concurrency
Dewey	Vici	123.6	198.9		US 60 / SH-51	Western end of US-60/SH-51 concurrency
Woodward		141.0	226.9		US 183 / US 270 / SH-3	Southern end of US-183/US-270/SH-3 concurrency
Woodward	Woodward	144.8	233.0		US 183 / US 270 / US 412 / SH-3	Northern end of US-183/US-270/SH-3 concurrency
Woodward		146.3	235.4		SH-34C	Western terminus of SH-34C
Woodward		174.4	280.7		US 64	Western end of US-64 concurrency
Woods		177.9	286.3		US 64	Eastern end of US-64 concurrency
Oklahoma–Kansas state line		188.3	303.0	K-1 continues north into Kansas		
1.000 mi = 1.609 km; 1.000 km = 0.621 mi: Concurrency terminus

== Spurs ==
=== SH-34A ===
State Highway 34A
- Location: Willow
- Length: 1.00 mi (1.61 km)
- Existed: c. 1943–present

SH-34A is a 1.00-mile (1.61 km) spur connecting SH-34 with Willow, north of Mangum. The highway begins at the west edge of Willow and follows Main Street east as it bisects the town. East of the town limits, the highway intersects US-283/SH-34 and ends.

SH-34A first appeared on the 1944 state highway map.

=== SH-34B ===
State Highway 34B
- Location: Brinkman
- Length: 1.03 mi (1.66 km)
- Existed: c. 1943–present

SH-34B is a 1.03-mile (1.66 km) spur connecting SH-34 with Brinkman, north of Mangum. The highway follows Main Street from unincorporated Brinkman to US-283/SH-34.

SH-34B first appeared on the 1944 state highway map.

=== SH-34C ===
State Highway 34C
- Location: Boiling Springs State Park
- Length: 4.52 mi (7.27 km)
- Existed: c. 1947–present

SH-34C is a 4.52-mile (7.27 km) spur connecting SH-34 with Boiling Springs State Park north of Woodward. The highway heads east from SH-34, curving northeast near the park's golf course, before making a sharp turn toward the northeast. The highway ends on the west side of the park, with an access road continuing through it; on the east side of the park, the access road intersects SH-50B at its western terminus.

The road that is currently SH-34C first appeared on the 1948 state highway map as SH-15A. At this time, the highway began at US-183/US-270/SH-15/SH-34 in Woodward and headed north, then turned east north of the city and headed to Boiling Springs State Park. When SH-34 was realigned north of Woodward on November 1, 1954, it took over the portion of SH-15A in Woodward, severing the highway's link to its parent. SH-15A had been renumbered as SH-34C by 1956. By 1957, the highway was extended east, passing through the park and continuing onward to SH-50. However, by 1959, the road through the park had been removed from the state highway system; the segment of highway east of the park was renumbered to SH-50B.
