= KS-1 =

KS1 or KS-1 may refer to:

== Weapons ==
- KS-1 (missile), a Chinese surface-to-air missile
- Raduga KS-1 Komet, a Soviet anti-ship missile
- KS-1 rifle, an assault rifle adopted by the British Armed Forces

== Other uses ==
- Kansas's 1st congressional district, to the United States House of Representatives
- K-1 (Kansas highway), an American road
- Key Stage 1, a British primary educational term
