= The Duke Times =

Oklahoma newspaper published from - 1908

- Type: Weekly newspaper
- Editor: W. F. Kane
- Founded: June 11, 1908; 117 years ago
- City: Oklahoma
- Country: United States
- Website: https://theduketimes.com

The Duke Times was a weekly newspaper published in Duke, Oklahoma from 1908. Founded by W. F. Kane in 1908, the newspaper was published as a weekly printed every Thursday with eight pages and four columns and included local, state, and national news along with advertising. The subscription cost to the paper was $1.00 annually.

The weekly paper served Duke from 1908 and into the 1970s. There is no indication this paper supported any political, religious or ethnic groups. It succeeded as The Duke Times and Jackson County News and was published by Mary Osborne from 1970 to 1983.

== Notable people ==
- W. F. Kane, founder and editor.
- Roberts, Jasper N, editor and publisher.
