= K-1 (Kansas highway) =

State highway in Kansas, U.S.

K-1
- K-1 highlighted in red

Route information
- Maintained by KDOT
- Length: 13.363 mi (21.506 km)

Major junctions
- South end: SH-34 south of Buttermilk
- North end: US-160 / US-183 south of Coldwater

Location
- Country: United States
- State: Kansas
- Counties: Comanche

Highway system
- Kansas State Highway System; Interstate; US; State; Spurs
← I-670	→ K-2

K-1 is a 13.363-mile-long (21.506 km), north-south state highway in southern Comanche County, Kansas, United States, that connects Oklahoma State Highway 34 (SH‑34), with U.S. Route 160/U.S. Route 183 (US‑160/US‑183).

== Route description ==
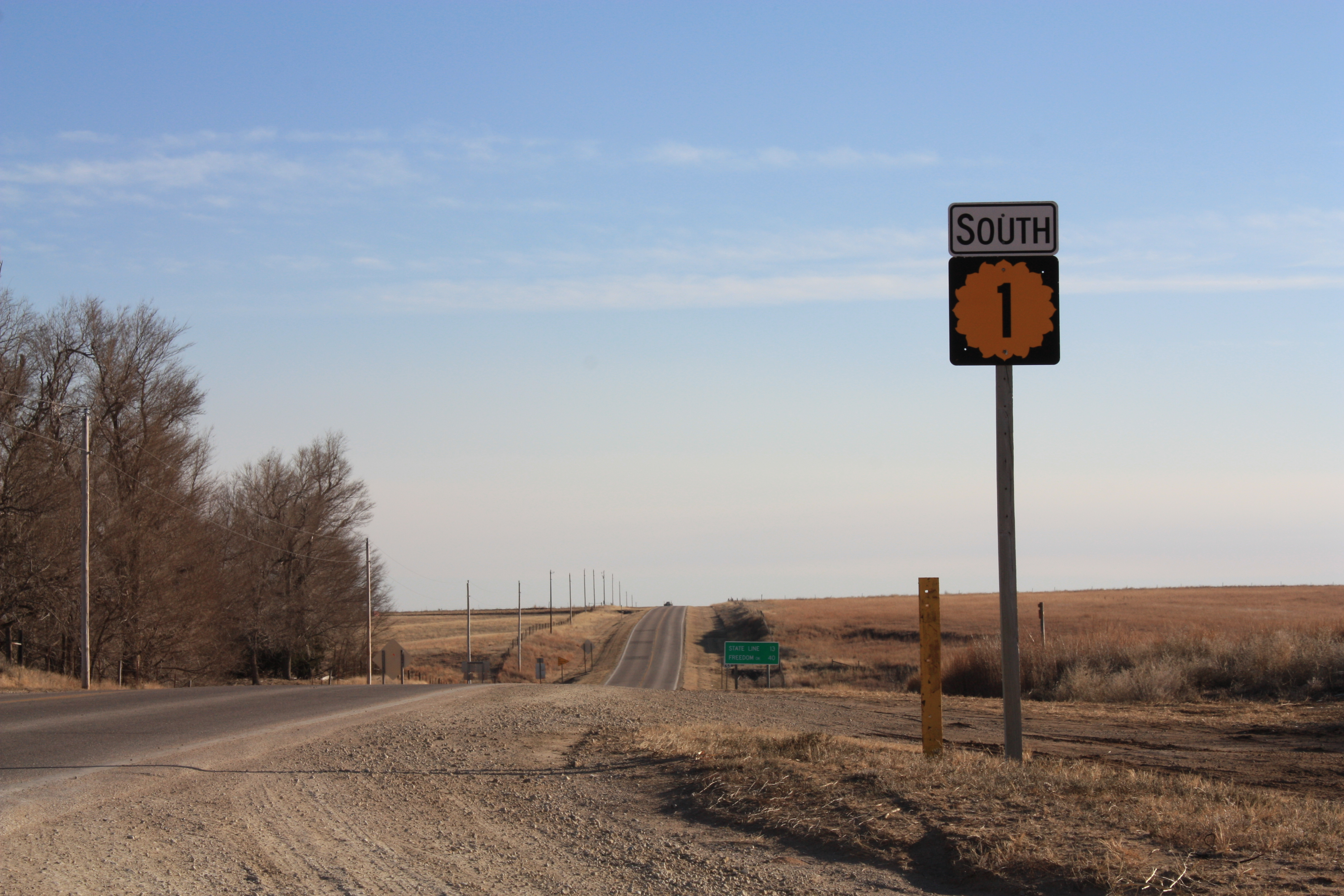
K-1 looking south from its northern terminus, February 2011

K-1 begins at the Oklahoma state line, where it is a continuation of Oklahoma State Highway 34. From its southern terminus it heads in north, turning slightly to the northwest before heading directly north again. It passes through the unincorporated community of Buttermilk, which is the only community on the route. From Buttermilk, K-1 continues north until it reaches it northern terminus at an intersection with US‑160/US‑183, south of Coldwater. US‑160/US‑183 continues north to Coldwater and west to Protection.

The entire route of K-1 is paved with partial design bituminous pavement, a type of bituminous pavement that is not designed or constructed to carry the highway's expected traffic. Annual average daily traffic values for the highway rise slowly from 600 over the southernmost 4.000 miles (6.437 km) of the route to 645 over the northernmost 5.363 miles (8.631 km) of the route. K-1 highway is not a part of the United States National Highway System.

== History ==
K‑1 highway was originally established sometime between 1918 and 1932. Originally, it ran much farther to the north than its current terminus, passing from the Oklahoma–Kansas border south of Coldwater north through Greensburg, Kinsley, western sections of Pawnee County, La Crosse, Hays, Plainville, Stockton, and Phillipsburg to a northern terminus just northeast of the town of Woodruff. It terminated at K-22, which was later known as U.S. Route 83, close to the border with Nebraska. In 1941, the majority of K‑1 (except the southernmost section) began to be replaced with US‑183, beginning with the section between Rozel and Plainville. By 1950, US‑183 had replaced all but the current alignment of K‑1. It was not until 1953 that the entirety of K-1 was paved, as the section of K-1 that comprises the current alignment was not paved until between 1950 and 1953. Since 1953, K-1 has remained at its current alignment.

== Major intersections ==
The entire route is in Comanche County.

Location	mi	km	Destinations	Notes
	0.000	0.000	SH-34 south – Freedom	Southern terminus; road continues into Oklahoma
	13.363	21.506	US-160 / US-183 – Coldwater, Protection	Northern terminus
1.000 mi = 1.609 km; 1.000 km = 0.621 mi

== See also ==
- List of state highways in Kansas
- List of highways numbered 1
