= Big Gyp Cave Pictograph site =

Archeological site in Kansas, United States

- Big Gyp Cave Pictograph site (14CM305)
- U.S. National Register of Historic Places
- Location: Address restricted, Comanche County, Kansas
- MPS: MPS
- NRHP reference No.: 82004864
- Added to NRHP: July 9, 1982

Big Gyp Cave Pictograph site (14CM305) in Comanche County, Kansas, is an archeological site with pictographs in a cave. It was listed on the National Register of Historic Places in 1978.

This cave is one of 30 rock art sites in Kansas. The pictographs at this site are dated from 1541 to 1870, part of the Plains Village period.

It includes at least one anthropomorphic pictograph.

== Geography ==
The Big Gyp Cave is located in the state of Kansas in Comanche county jurisdiction in the Red hills area, also called Gyp hills or/and Medicine hills by the Native American tribes however, its exact location is hidden from the public.

== History and significance ==
Big Gyp cave is the only pictograph site recorded in the state of Kansas and was unrecognized until in 1979-80 Kansas Petroglyph survey was carried out by Brian O’neal, the surveyor chosen by the Historic Preservation Department. In 1982 it was officially recognized by The National Register of Historic Places after being nominated among 30 sites for the Kansas Rock Art Thematic National Register Nomination. The pictographs could tell us valuable information about the lives of the natives that inhabited that area in the past and created the pictographs. The area has been dated as having had The National Registry of Historical Places classifies its historical significance as having information potential; this leaves the impression that the cave’s art still needs further interpretation and study.

It is still not certain what Native American people is responsible for the rock art in the cave although, some academics have theorized possible candidates based on the knowledge we have accrued on the distinct tribes that have inhabited that geographic region throughout our history. It is believed to have belonged to any of the following:

The Wichita and The Plains Apaches which were proposed by Howard (1964) and Wedel (1969).

The Osage hunted in the area before settling it around 1820. The Comanche, Kiowa, and Kiowa-Apache bands who succeeded the Plains Apache respectively. The Cheyenne and Arapaho in turn displaced these groups by the 1800s.

== Pictographs and deterioration ==
Centuries of spalling had resulted in the deterioration of most of the pictographs by the 1980’s as such the Kansas Petroglyph Survey could only confidently identify one of the figures as an anthropomorphic illustration. Yet, even this identifiable figure suffered from erosion and weathering; particularly it appears that some precipitating minerals damaged the pictograph hampering its visibility. The Kansas Petroglyph Survey had classified the state of preservation of the site as being in “poor” condition.

== Access ==
The cave belongs to a private owner and it is a restricted site; this is also in part to protect the heritage of the place from vandalism, as it is rampant amongst archeological remains in other sites of the region. Expeditions into the area require prior authorization and in recent years the most notable excursions to Big Gyp have been performed by prominent local biologist Stan Roth who has been studying bats and other wildlife in the caves of central and southern Kansas. In these he takes his students and other academic staff. From these excursions there are reports of soapstone being found in Big Gyp although this needs further confirmation. The accessibility to the area is difficult since it must be reached by dirt road and to get in one must further traverse the wooded entrance slippery rocks and knee high mud in some instances.

== Dating ==
A fraction of a rock was used to date all the sites in the Kansas Petroglyph Survey including Big Gyp since there are equestrian glyphs in the site of the rock. This has led some scholars such as Howard (1964) and Wedel (1969) to deduce a date for the sites from 1541 to 1870 AD; they concluded that they must be at least protohistoric at its earliest (1541 AD), with the introduction of horses to the area. At the latest moreover, until the time of complete encroachment of European-American settlement in the area by the 1870’s. However, this is a broad date and not too reliable given that the date for Big Gyp was speculated according to the other sites’ petroglyphic art. To this day the specific site of Big Gyp has not had a reliable date assigned to it as it has not been carbon dated and the nature of the pictographs make it harder to tell by drawing conclusions from the designs as had been done for the equestrian glyphs in the nearby sites, due to poor conditions making the pictographs not easily recognizable.

== Geology ==
The so-called Red Hills where the cave lies are topped by a layer of gypsum that gives the cave its name. The Big Gyp cave is one of the biggest caves in Kansas and is marked by a uniquely large entrance; within lies a stream that runs through the tunnel like a cave. In an online exposition of photos for a high school project one of Stan Roth’s students posted a series of pictures showing features like a small waterfall inside which holds a soapstone dam.

== Biodiversity ==
Brown bats, are mentioned to reside there in a local article about Stanley Roth’s expedition with students.
