= Buttermilk, Kansas =

Unincorporated community in Comanche County, Kansas

- Unincorporated community
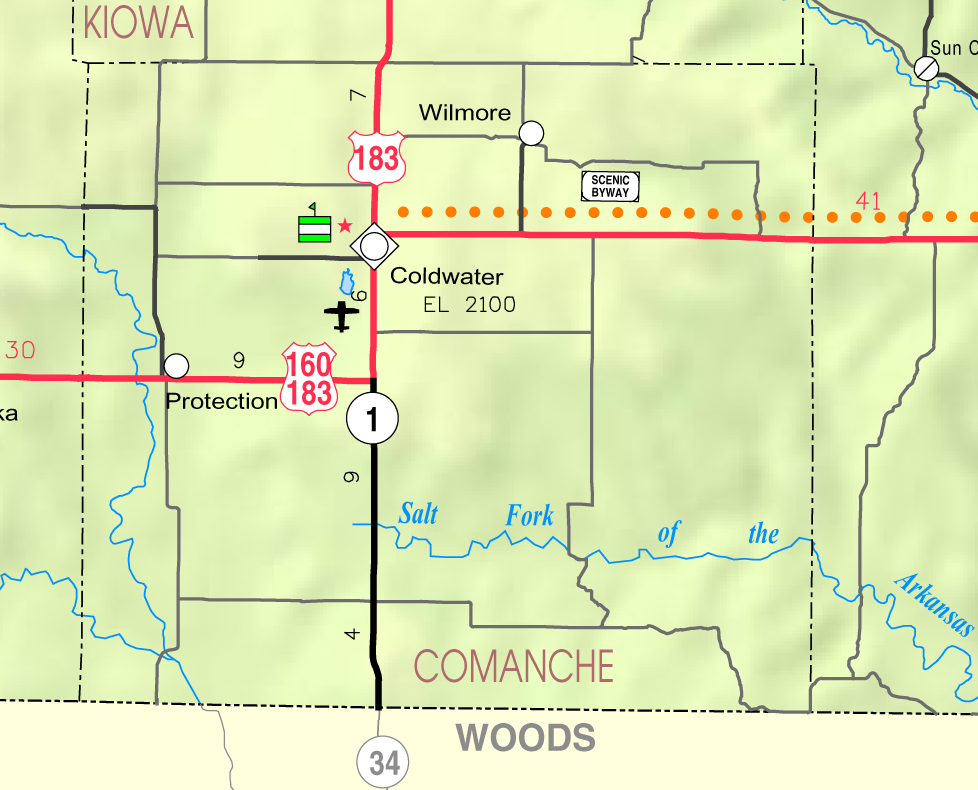
- KDOT map of Comanche County (legend)

- Location within the state of Kansas Buttermilk (the United States)
- Coordinates: 37°6′10″N 99°19′31″W
- Country: United States
- State: Kansas
- County: Comanche
- Elevation: 1,896 ft (578 m)
- Time zone: UTC-6 (CST)
  - Summer (DST): UTC-5 (CDT)
- Area code: 620
- FIPS code: 20-09750
- GNIS ID: 484539

Buttermilk is an unincorporated community in Comanche County, Kansas, United States.

== History ==
As of 2014, it consisted of a farmhouse and outbuildings, a church and three houses. It does not ordinarily appear on any road maps.

The nearby Big Gyp Cave Pictograph Site is on the National Register of Historic Places.

== Education ==
The community is served by Comanche County USD 300 public school district.
