= Greer County, Oklahoma =

County in Oklahoma, United States

- County
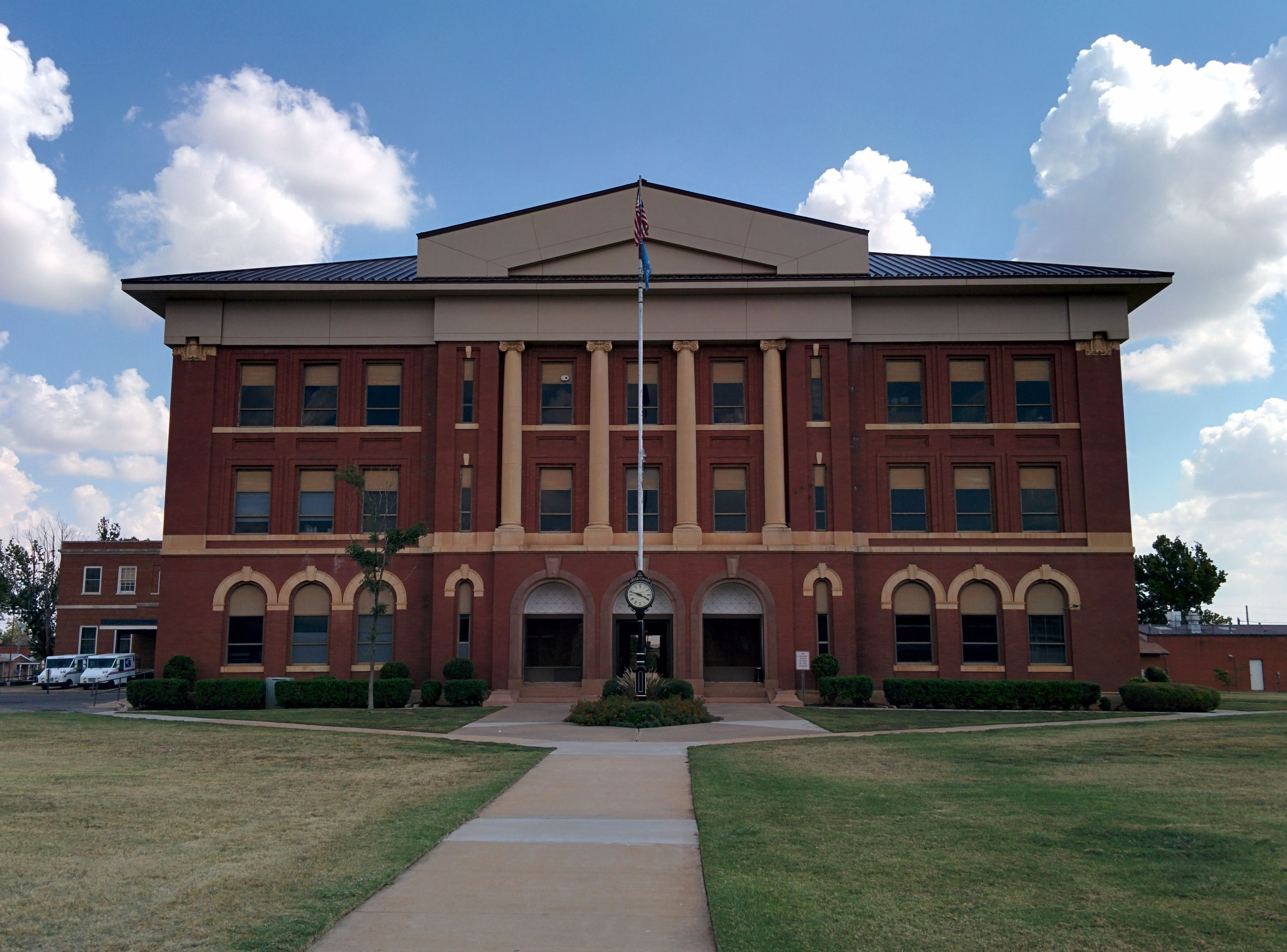
- Greer County Courthouse in Mangum

- Location within the U.S. state of Oklahoma
- Coordinates: 34°56′N 99°34′W
- Country: United States
- State: Oklahoma
- Founded: 1896
- Named for: John Alexander Greer
- Seat: Mangum
- Largest city: Mangum

Area
  - Total: 644 sq mi (1,670 km^{2})
  - Land: 639 sq mi (1,660 km^{2})
  - Water: 4.3 sq mi (11 km^{2}) 0.7%

Population (2020)
  - Total: 5,491
  - Estimate (2025): 5,373 ▼
  - Density: 8.59/sq mi (3.32/km^{2})
- Time zone: UTC−6 (Central)
  - Summer (DST): UTC−5 (CDT)
- Congressional district: 3rd
- Website: greer.okcounties.org

Greer County is a county located along the southwest border of the U.S. state of Oklahoma. As of the 2020 census, the population was 5,491. Its county seat is Mangum. From 1860 to 1896, the state of Texas claimed an area known as Greer County, Texas, which included present-day Greer County along with neighboring areas. In 1896 it was designated as a county in Oklahoma Territory under a ruling by the US Supreme Court. The rural Greer County is home to Quartz Mountain State Park, near the community of Lone Wolf, Oklahoma. It is also home to the Oklahoma State Reformatory, located in Granite. Its population has declined since 1930 due to changes in agriculture and migration to cities for work.

== History ==
After a dispute over the 1819 Adams-Onís Treaty and the related 1828 Treaty of Limits, the governments of both the United States and the state of Texas claimed ownership of some 1.5 million acres (6,100 km^{2}) in what was then operated as Greer County, Texas. The county was named for former Texas lieutenant governor, John A. Greer. Litigation followed, and in the case of United States v. State of Texas 162 U.S. 1 (1896), with a ruling issued on March 16, the Supreme Court, having original jurisdiction over the case, decided in favor of the United States.

The county was assigned to the Oklahoma Territory on May 4, 1896. When Oklahoma was admitted as a state, Greer County was established according to its current boundaries; the remaining former county area was organized as Harmon, Jackson, and part of Beckham counties. The town of Mangum, designated as the county seat in 1886 when it was part of Texas, continued as the seat of Greer County, Oklahoma. From its establishment until at least 1903, Greer County was a sundown county, prohibiting African Americans from living in the county.

Originally developed for agriculture, the rural county had its peak of population in 1930. Mechanization of agriculture reduced the need for farm labor, and the population has declined as people migrated to cities for work.

Among the county attractions is Quartz Mountain State Park (known from 2002 to 2020 as Quartz Mountain Nature Park), near the community of Lone Wolf.

== Geography ==
According to the U.S. Census Bureau, the county has a total area of 644 square miles (1,670 km^{2}), of which 639 square miles (1,660 km^{2}) is land and 4.3 square miles (11 km^{2}) (0.7%) is water.

Western Greer County lies in the Gypsum Hills, while the eastern one-third is in the Red Bed Plains physiographic region. The county is drained by the North Fork Red River, Elm Fork Red River, and Salt Fork Red River.

=== Major highways ===
- U.S. Highway 283
- State Highway 6
- State Highway 9
- State Highway 34
  - State Highway 34A
  - State Highway 34B
- State Highway 44
  - State Highway 44A

=== Adjacent counties ===
- Beckham County (north)
- Kiowa County (east)
- Jackson County (south)
- Harmon County (west)

== Demographics ==
Historical population
Census	Pop.	Note	%±
1910	16,449		—
1920	15,836		−3.7%
1930	20,282		28.1%
1940	14,550		−28.3%
1950	11,749		−19.3%
1960	8,877		−24.4%
1970	7,979		−10.1%
1980	7,028		−11.9%
1990	6,559		−6.7%
2000	6,061		−7.6%
2010	6,239		2.9%
2020	5,491		−12.0%
2025 (est.)	5,373	▼	−2.1%
U.S. Decennial Census; 1790–1960 1900–1990; 1990–2000 2010

=== 2020 census ===
As of the 2020 United States census, the county had a population of 5,491. Of the residents, 20.9% were under the age of 18 and 18.4% were 65 years of age or older; the median age was 40.8 years. For every 100 females there were 124.9 males, and for every 100 females age 18 and over there were 134.3 males.

The racial makeup of the county was 77.9% White, 6.6% Black or African American, 3.4% American Indian and Alaska Native, 0.1% Asian, 3.6% from some other race, and 8.4% from two or more races. Hispanic or Latino residents of any race comprised 12.1% of the population.

There were 1,940 households in the county, of which 30.8% had children under the age of 18 living with them and 30.3% had a female householder with no spouse or partner present. About 31.2% of all households were made up of individuals and 18.0% had someone living alone who was 65 years of age or older.

There were 2,615 housing units, of which 25.8% were vacant. Among occupied housing units, 72.1% were owner-occupied and 27.9% were renter-occupied. The homeowner vacancy rate was 4.6% and the rental vacancy rate was 17.5%.

=== 2000 census ===
As of the census of 2000, there were 6,061 people, 2,237 households, and 1,442 families residing in the county. The population density was 10 people per square mile (3.9 people/km^{2}). There were 2,788 housing units at an average density of 4 units per square mile (1.5/km^{2}). The racial makeup of the county was 81.46% White, 8.78% Black or African American, 2.47% Native American, 0.26% Asian, 0.02% Pacific Islander, 3.99% from other races, and 3.02% from two or more races. 7.44% of the population were Hispanic or Latino of any race.

There were 2,237 households, out of which 25.60% had children under the age of 18 living with them, 51.00% were married couples living together, 9.60% had a female householder with no husband present, and 35.50% were non-families. 33.40% of all households were made up of individuals, and 19.80% had someone living alone who was 65 years of age or older. The average household size was 2.27 and the average family size was 2.87.

In the county, the population was spread out, with 20.00% under the age of 18, 9.10% from 18 to 24, 28.40% from 25 to 44, 22.40% from 45 to 64, and 20.00% who were 65 years of age or older. The median age was 40 years. For every 100 females there were 123.80 males. For every 100 females age 18 and over, there were 129.60 males.

The median income for a household in the county was $25,793, and the median income for a family was $30,702. Males had a median income of $24,318 versus $18,641 for females. The per capita income for the county was $14,053. About 15.00% of families and 19.60% of the population were below the poverty line, including 28.40% of those under age 18 and 14.80% of those age 65 or over.

== Politics ==
Voter Registration and Party Enrollment as of June 30, 2023
Party	Number of Voters	Percentage
Democratic	916	32.28%
Republican	1,501	52.89%
Others	421	14.83%
Total	2,838	100%

United States presidential election results for Greer County, Oklahoma
Year	Republican		Democratic		Third party(ies)	
Year	No.	%	No.	%	No.	%
1908	708	21.08%	2,149	63.98%	502	14.94%
1912	351	16.80%	1,334	63.86%	404	19.34%
1916	369	14.60%	1,675	66.28%	483	19.11%
1920	1,013	32.75%	1,854	59.94%	226	7.31%
1924	551	19.50%	1,982	70.13%	293	10.37%
1928	2,262	57.48%	1,645	41.80%	28	0.71%
1932	418	8.97%	4,240	91.03%	0	0.00%
1936	766	16.94%	3,745	82.82%	11	0.24%
1940	1,195	25.21%	3,524	74.35%	21	0.44%
1944	1,075	26.45%	2,984	73.43%	5	0.12%
1948	713	18.98%	3,044	81.02%	0	0.00%
1952	2,147	48.05%	2,321	51.95%	0	0.00%
1956	1,499	44.01%	1,907	55.99%	0	0.00%
1960	2,158	55.96%	1,698	44.04%	0	0.00%
1964	1,247	31.83%	2,671	68.17%	0	0.00%
1968	1,225	35.26%	1,419	40.85%	830	23.89%
1972	2,154	66.40%	1,004	30.95%	86	2.65%
1976	1,164	35.19%	2,113	63.88%	31	0.94%
1980	1,535	49.53%	1,492	48.14%	72	2.32%
1984	1,664	57.36%	1,220	42.05%	17	0.59%
1988	1,225	48.94%	1,256	50.18%	22	0.88%
1992	964	34.69%	1,162	41.81%	653	23.50%
1996	905	35.96%	1,240	49.26%	372	14.78%
2000	1,287	59.80%	839	38.99%	26	1.21%
2004	1,529	68.02%	719	31.98%	0	0.00%
2008	1,548	73.23%	566	26.77%	0	0.00%
2012	1,344	73.36%	488	26.64%	0	0.00%
2016	1,482	78.16%	323	17.04%	91	4.80%
2020	1,605	81.35%	328	16.62%	40	2.03%
2024	1,511	82.30%	304	16.56%	21	1.14%

== Economy ==
The county's economy has been based on farming and raising livestock. In 1907, the main crops were cotton, corn, oats, wheat and alfalfa. Livestock raised includes cattle, horses, mules, swine, sheep and goats.

The Oklahoma State Reformatory is located in Granite in the county and provides some jobs.

== Communities ==
=== Cities ===
- Mangum (county seat)

=== Towns ===
- Granite
- Willow

=== Unincorporated communities ===
- Brinkman
- Reed

== Education ==
School districts include:

- Blair Public Schools
- Duke Public Schools
- Erick Public Schools
- Granite Public Schools
- Hollis Public Schools
- Lone Wolf Public Schools
- Mangum Public Schools
- Merritt Public Schools
- Navajo Public Schools
- Sayre Public Schools

== Notable people ==
- Edward Everett Dale (1879–1972), historian; professor at the University of Oklahoma
- William T. Ponder (1891–1947), World War I flying ace
- Victor E. Wickersham (1906–1988), U.S. politician; member of the U.S. House of Representatives

== See also ==
- List of sundown towns in the United States
- National Register of Historic Places listings in Greer County, Oklahoma
- USS Greer County (LST-799)
