= Ringgold, Nebraska =

Unincorporated community in McPherson County, Nebraska, United States

- Unincorporated community
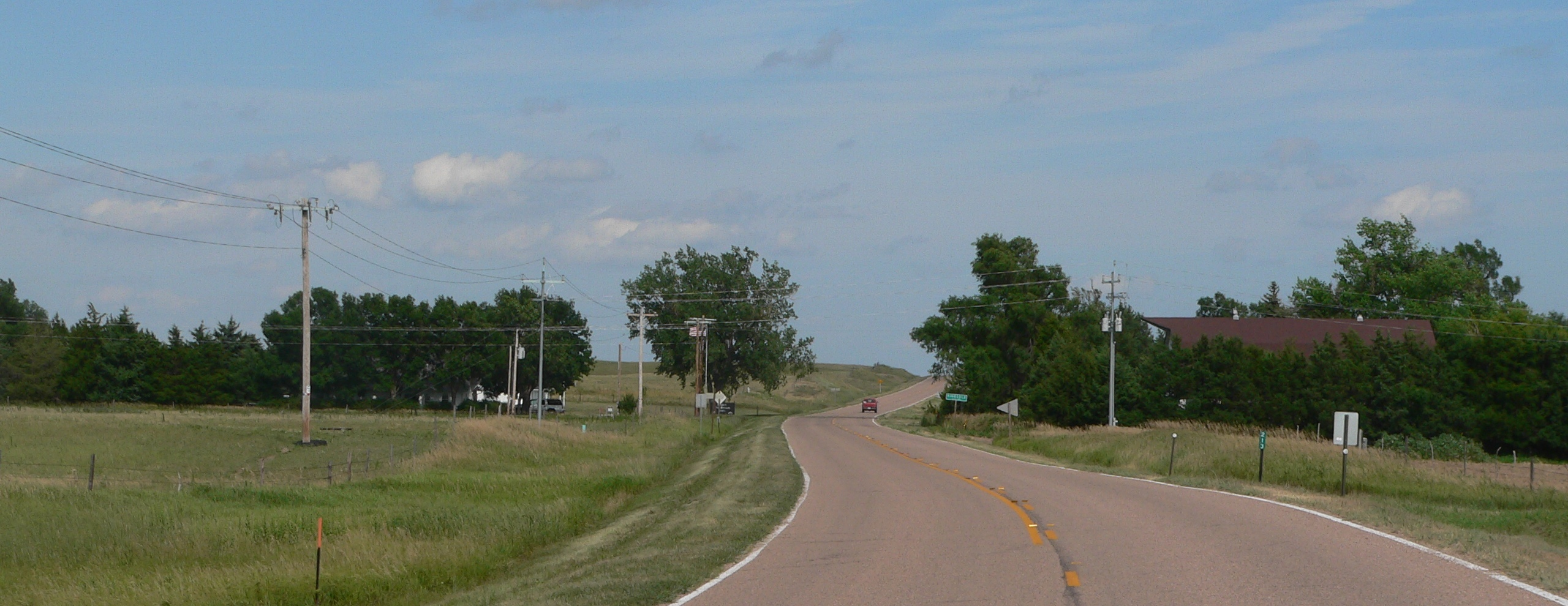
- Ringgold, seen from the west along Nebraska Highway 92

- Location within Nebraska Location within the United States
- Coordinates: 41°30′31″N 100°47′30″W
- Country: United States
- State: Nebraska
- County: McPherson
- Elevation: 3,176 ft (968 m)
- Time zone: UTC-6 (Central (CST))
  - Summer (DST): UTC-5 (CDT)
- GNIS feature ID: 832563

Ringgold is an unincorporated community in McPherson County, Nebraska, United States. Its elevation is 3,176 feet (968 m). Ringgold is part of the North Platte, Nebraska Micropolitan Statistical Area.

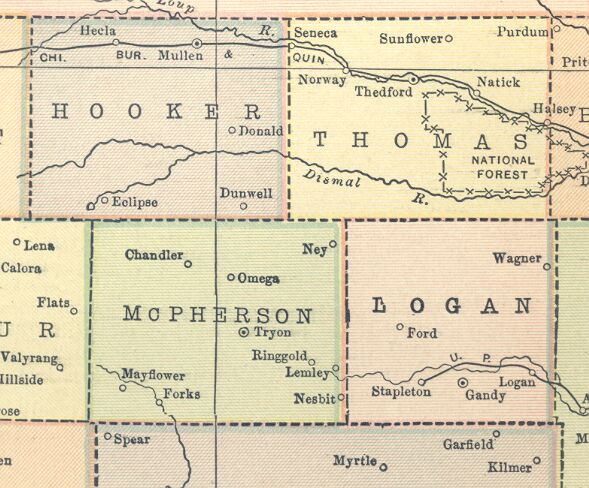
Ringgold's location according to a 1914 atlas

== History ==
A post office was operated in Ringgold for over sixty years, opening on 1 December 1906 and closing on 11 August 1967. A group of settlers from Ringold, Dawson County (an extinct town) named the community for their former home.
