= East Duke, Oklahoma =

- Town
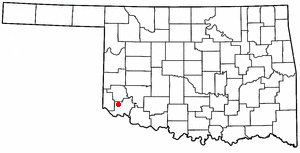
- Location of East Duke, Oklahoma
- Coordinates: 34°39′46″N 99°34′11″W
- Country: United States
- State: Oklahoma
- County: Jackson

Area
  - Total: 0.44 sq mi (1.13 km^{2})
  - Land: 0.44 sq mi (1.13 km^{2})
  - Water: 0 sq mi (0.00 km^{2})
- Elevation: 1,421 ft (433 m)

Population (2020)
  - Total: 394
  - Density: 906.7/sq mi (350.06/km^{2})
- Time zone: UTC-6 (Central (CST))
  - Summer (DST): UTC-5 (CDT)
- ZIP code: 73532
- Area code: 580
- FIPS code: 40-22550
- GNIS feature ID: 2412459
- Website: townofeastduke.com

East Duke, now known as Duke, is a town in Jackson County, Oklahoma, United States. The population was 394 as of the 2020 United States census. It is located about 14 miles west of the county seat of Altus, and is located at the intersection of US Route 62 and Oklahoma State Highway 34.

== History ==
The town of Duke was founded in 1890. Speculation about the location of a projected railroad sparked a separation in the community, creating an old town called West Duke, and a new town called East Duke. While the community reconciled in 1915 when the parties eventually buried a hatchet delivered in a horse-drawn hearse, West Duke did not ultimately survive, and East Duke is now known simply as Duke.

== Geography ==
According to the United States Census Bureau, the town has a total area of 0.4 square miles (1.0 km^{2}), all land.

== Demographics ==
Historical population
Census	Pop.	Note	%±
1920	502		—
1930	543		8.2%
2000	445		—
2010	424		−4.7%
2020	394		−7.1%
U.S. Decennial Census

=== 2020 census ===
As of the 2020 census, East Duke had a population of 394. The median age was 40.0 years. 27.2% of residents were under the age of 18 and 20.3% of residents were 65 years of age or older. For every 100 females there were 103.1 males, and for every 100 females age 18 and over there were 106.5 males age 18 and over.

0.0% of residents lived in urban areas, while 100.0% lived in rural areas.

There were 143 households in East Duke, of which 39.9% had children under the age of 18 living in them. Of all households, 57.3% were married-couple households, 16.8% were households with a male householder and no spouse or partner present, and 20.3% were households with a female householder and no spouse or partner present. About 18.9% of all households were made up of individuals and 9.8% had someone living alone who was 65 years of age or older.

There were 174 housing units, of which 17.8% were vacant. The homeowner vacancy rate was 5.5% and the rental vacancy rate was 8.7%.

Racial composition as of the 2020 census
Race	Number	Percent
White	343	87.1%
Black or African American	1	0.3%
American Indian and Alaska Native	8	2.0%
Asian	0	0.0%
Native Hawaiian and Other Pacific Islander	0	0.0%
Some other race	13	3.3%
Two or more races	29	7.4%
Hispanic or Latino (of any race)	36	9.1%

=== 2010 census ===
As of the census of 2010, there were 424 people living in the town. The population density was 1,024.2 inhabitants per square mile (395.4/km^{2}). There were 201 housing units at an average density of 459 per square mile (177/km^{2}). The racial makeup of the town was 88.31% White, 0.22% African American, 0.67% Native American, 0.90% Asian, 5.17% from other races, and 4.72% from two or more races. Hispanic or Latino of any race were 9.44% of the population.

There were 172 households, out of which 36.2% had children under the age of 18 living with them, 66.1% were married couples living together, 8.0% had a female householder with no husband present, and 24.7% were non-families. 20.7% of all households were made up of individuals, and 11.5% had someone living alone who was 65 years of age or older. The average household size was 2.56 and the average family size was 2.98.

In the town, the population was spread out, with 28.1% under the age of 18, 7.4% from 18 to 24, 29.7% from 25 to 44, 21.3% from 45 to 64, and 13.5% who were 65 years of age or older. The median age was 35 years. For every 100 females, there were 104.1 males. For every 100 females age 18 and over, there were 89.3 males.

The median income for a household in the town was $33,942, and the median income for a family was $39,063. Males had a median income of $30,673 versus $16,875 for females. The per capita income for the town was $16,739. About 4.7% of families and 8.5% of the population were below the poverty line, including 12.7% of those under age 18 and 9.4% of those age 65 or over.
