= Willow, Oklahoma =

- Village
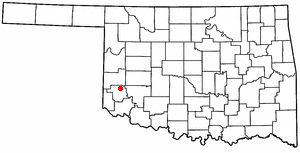
- Location of Willow, Oklahoma
- Coordinates: 35°03′06″N 99°30′36″W
- Country: United States
- State: Oklahoma
- County: Greer

Area
  - Total: 0.26 sq mi (0.68 km^{2})
  - Land: 0.26 sq mi (0.68 km^{2})
  - Water: 0 sq mi (0.00 km^{2})
- Elevation: 1,742 ft (531 m)

Population (2020)
  - Total: 119
  - Density: 454/sq mi (175.3/km^{2})
- Time zone: UTC-6 (Central (CST))
  - Summer (DST): UTC-5 (CDT)
- ZIP code: 73673
- Area code: 580
- FIPS code: 40-81300
- GNIS feature ID: 2413491

Willow is a village in Greer County, Oklahoma, United States. The population was 119 as of the 2020 United States census. It is situated about 13 miles north of the county seat of Mangum, just west of the concurrent US Route 283 and Oklahoma State Highway 34.

== Geography ==
According to the United States Census Bureau, Willow has a total area of 0.3 square miles (0.78 km^{2}), all land.

== Demographics ==
Historical population
Census	Pop.	Note	%±
1920	286		—
1930	347		21.3%
1940	248		−28.5%
1950	223		−10.1%
1960	187		−16.1%
1970	188		0.5%
1980	162		−13.8%
1990	142		−12.3%
2000	114		−19.7%
2010	149		30.7%
2020	119		−20.1%
U.S. Decennial Census

As of the census of 2000, there were 114 people, 54 households, and 28 families residing in the town. The population density was 430.7 inhabitants per square mile (166.3/km^{2}). There were 66 housing units at an average density of 249.4 per square mile (96.3/km^{2}). The racial makeup of the town was 93.86% White, 5.26% from other races, and 0.88% from two or more races. Hispanic or Latino of any race were 12.28% of the population.

There were 54 households, out of which 24.1% had children under the age of 18 living with them, 50.0% were married couples living together, 3.7% had a female householder with no husband present, and 46.3% were non-families. 44.4% of all households were made up of individuals, and 27.8% had someone living alone who was 65 years of age or older. The average household size was 2.11 and the average family size was 3.03.

In the town, the population was spread out, with 22.8% under the age of 18, 2.6% from 18 to 24, 22.8% from 25 to 44, 24.6% from 45 to 64, and 27.2% who were 65 years of age or older. The median age was 46 years. For every 100 females, there were 83.9 males. For every 100 females age 18 and over, there were 83.3 males.

The median income for a household in the town was $29,167, and the median income for a family was $43,750. Males had a median income of $23,958 versus $28,333 for females. The per capita income for the town was $16,630. There were no families and 9.0% of the population living below the poverty line, including no under eighteens and 25.0% of those over 64.

== Education ==
It is in the Granite Public Schools school district.
