= Corbin, Louisiana =

- Unincorporated community
- Location within Louisiana Location within the United States
- Coordinates: 30°29′45″N 90°50′58″W
- Country: United States
- State: Louisiana
- Parish: Livingston
- Elevation: 46 ft (14 m)
- Time zone: UTC-6 (Central (CST))
  - Summer (DST): UTC-5 (CDT)
- ZIP code: 70785
- Area code: 225
- GNIS feature ID: 543105
- FIPS code: 22-17495

Corbin is an unincorporated community in Livingston Parish, Louisiana, United States. The community is located 6 miles (9.7 kilometres) east of Denham Springs and 6 miles (9.7 kilometres) west of Livingston.

== History ==
In 1908 the Illinois Central Railroad built a line connecting Hammond to Baton Rouge. At that time a man named Robert A. Corbin owned the majority of the land in the area and the railroad named the depot after him. The Corbin railroad depot was the only stop where water was available for trains traveling between Hammond and Baton Rouge. Then in 1964 local citizens used the Lawrason Act to incorporate into an independent town. Earl Pay Wascom was appointed as the town's first mayor.
