= Brinkman, Oklahoma =

- Unincorporated community
- Location within the state of Oklahoma Brinkman (the United States)
- Coordinates: 35°0′36″N 99°31′0″W
- Country: United States
- State: Oklahoma
- County: Greer
- Elevation: 1,693 ft (516 m)
- Time zone: UTC-6 (Central (CST))
  - Summer (DST): UTC-5 (CDT)
- GNIS feature ID: 1090501

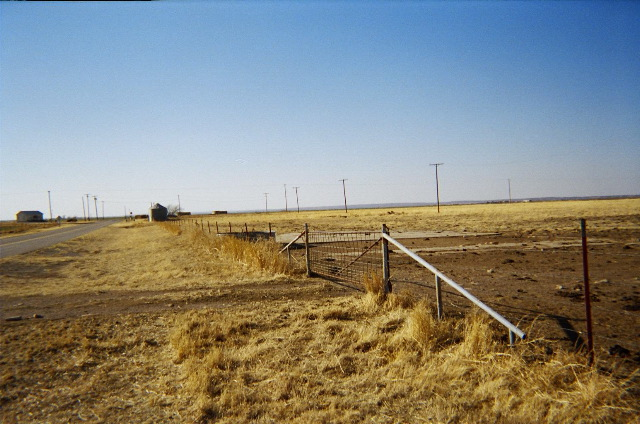
Brinkman in 2006.

Brinkman is an unincorporated community in Greer County, Oklahoma, United States. It lies at the western terminus of State Highway 34B, nine miles north of Mangum and one mile west of U.S. Route 283. Brinkman is now considered a ghost town.

== History ==
Brinkman was founded in 1910, and named after John Brinkman, who was a business associate of railroad builders Joseph A. Kemp and Frank Kell. A post office opened on June 17, 1910. By late 1911 it had its own weekly newspaper, the Brinkman Courier.

It was a market town for the surrounding area and had two large grain elevators as well as other amenities. But the bank closed in 1927, and a fire destroyed half the town in 1929. Most of the buildings were never rebuilt. Oklahoma State Highway 34, constructed in 1931, bypassed the town to the east, accelerating the decline.

The school closed in 1957.

A community historical marker was erected in 2012.

== Geography ==
Brinkman is located at an elevation of 1,693 feet (516 m).
