= Franklin House =

Franklin House, and variations such as Franklin Hall or Franklin Apartments, may refer to:

== United States ==
(by state then city)

- Franklin House (San Diego, California), an historic hotel
- Franklin House (Athens, Georgia), an NRHP-listed building
- Griffith-Franklin House, an NRHP-listed house in Calhoun, Kentucky
- Edwards–Franklin House, an NRHP-listed house in Dobson, North Carolina
- Edwards-Franklin House, a historic house museum in Low Gap, North Carolina
- Franklin-Penland House, an NRHP-listed house in Linville Falls, North Carolina
- Galt-Franklin Home, Ardmore, Oklahoma, NRHP-listed in Carter County
- Franklin Hall (Goodwell, Oklahoma), NRHP-listed
- M. E. Franklin House, Tahlequah, Oklahoma, NRHP-listed in Cherokee County
- Metcalf-Franklin Farm, an NRHP-listed farm and house in Cumberland, Rhode Island
- Oakley (Gallatin, Tennessee), known also as the Dr. John W. Franklin House, NRHP-listed
- Lawson D. Franklin House, an NRHP-listed house in White Pine, Tennessee
- Thomas H. Franklin House, San Antonio, Texas, listed on the NRHP in Bexar County

== Other places ==
- Benjamin Franklin House, a Grade I listed historic house museum in City of Westminster, U.K.
- Franklin House (Launceston), a museum in Franklin Village, Tasmania, Australia

== See also ==
- Franklin Apartments, Des Moines, Iowa
- Franklin Hotel (disambiguation)
- Franklin Printing House, a historic building in Iowa City, Iowa
- Franklin School (disambiguation)
