= Franklin Hotel =

Franklin Hotel may refer to:

in the United Kingdom

- Franklin Hotel, London

in the United States

(sorted by state, then city/town)

- Franklin Hotel (Strawberry Point, Iowa), listed on the National Register of Historic Places (NRHP) in Clayton County
- Franklin Hotel (Kent, Ohio), listed on the NRHP in Portage County
- Hotel Franklin, Mangum, Oklahoma, listed on the NRHP in Greer County
- Hotel Ramapo, Portland, Oregon, has been known as "Franklin Hotel" on the NRHP in Multnomah County
- Benjamin Franklin House, Philadelphia, Pennsylvania, formerly the Benjamin Franklin Hotel, listed on the NRHP in Philadelphia County

== See also ==
- Franklin House (disambiguation)
