= Yadkin =

Yadkin may refer to:

- Yadkin County, North Carolina
- Yadkin River
- Yadkin Valley AVA
