= National Register of Historic Places listings in Greer County, Oklahoma =

Location of Greer County in Oklahoma

This is a list of the National Register of Historic Places listings in Greer County, Oklahoma.

This is intended to be a complete list of the properties on the National Register of Historic Places in Greer County, Oklahoma, United States. The locations of National Register properties for which the latitude and longitude coordinates are included below, may be seen in a map.

There are 6 properties listed on the National Register in the county.

This National Park Service list is complete through NPS recent listings posted March 21, 2025.

== Current listings ==
	Name on the Register	Image	Date listed	Location	City or town	Description
1	Downtown Mangum Historic District	Downtown Mangum Historic District	December 3, 2009 (#09000976)	Roughly bounded by E. Lincoln, S. Pennsylvania, N. Oklahoma, and S. Oklahoma; 34°52′20″N 99°30′16″W	Mangum	
2	Greer County Courthouse	Greer County Courthouse	March 22, 1985 (#85000682)	Courthouse Square; 34°52′22″N 99°30′17″W	Mangum	
3	Hotel Franklin	Hotel Franklin	May 31, 2007 (#07000520)	217 West Jefferson; 34°52′26″N 99°30′23″W	Mangum	
4	Jay Buckle Springs	Jay Buckle Springs	March 7, 2008 (#08000150)	East of County Road N1840, 500 feet north of its junction with County Road E1420; 34°57′37″N 99°41′41″W	Reed	
5	Mangum Armory	Mangum Armory	April 7, 1994 (#94000278)	115 E. Lincoln St. 34°52′22″N 99°30′10″W	Mangum	
6	Mangum Community Building	Mangum Community Building	March 17, 1995 (#95000236)	201 W. Lincoln; 34°52′22″N 99°30′24″W	Mangum	

== See also ==
- List of National Historic Landmarks in Oklahoma
- National Register of Historic Places listings in Oklahoma
