= Childress Vineyards =

Winery in North Carolina

Coordinates: 35.843143°N 80.283279°W

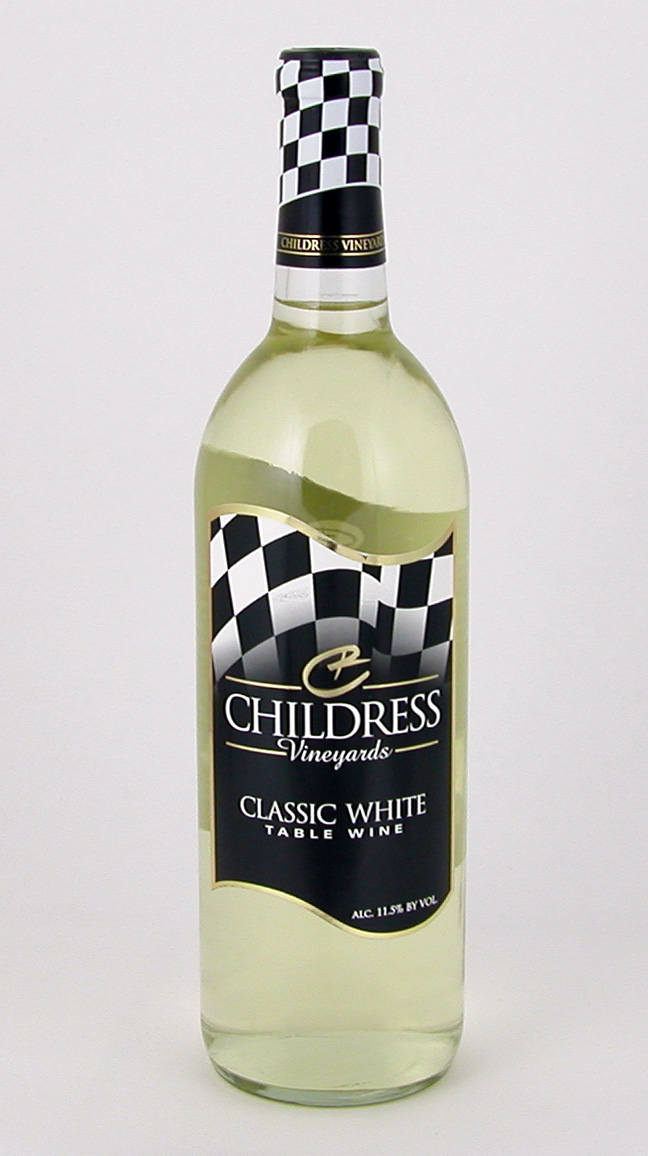
Bottle of Childress Vineyards Classic White Table Wine

Childress Vineyards is a winery in Lexington, North Carolina owned by NASCAR Cup Series championship team owner Richard Childress. The connection between NASCAR and fine wine is reflected in the labeling of some of the wines produced by Childress, featuring a checkered flag motif.

== History of wineries in North Carolina ==
In the mid-19th Century, there were some 25 wineries in North Carolina, with extensive independent vineyards, to the extent that North Carolina dominated the national market for American wines at the time. The Scuppernong grape was the primary source for North Carolina's 19th Century wine, as it had been for about two centuries. The Civil War ended that market dominance, through damage to the industry by loss of manpower and scarce capital, as well as through revocation of winemaking licenses due to regulatory retribution following the war. Wine production began to recover in the decades after the war through the early 20th Century. However, North Carolina voted to become a dry state in 1908 and that decision, coupled with the onset of Prohibition, ended winemaking in North Carolina. Repeal in 1933, followed by the passage by North Carolina's legislature in 1935 of laws permitting winemaking, began a rebirth, but it was several decades after World War II before North Carolina's wine industry would show significant growth.

== Origins, Operations and Wine Varietals at Childress Vineyards ==
While racing at California tracks in the 1970s, Richard Childress spent some of his off-track time at small wineries. He later explored vineyards in the Finger Lakes region in New York, following NASCAR's expansion to Watkins Glen. As he made friends with vineyard owners and winemakers, Childress began to consider starting his own vineyard. By the 1990s, Childress had purchased land, planted vines and by the end of the 90s was having his grapes custom-crushed, making wine to give to friends.

Childress Vineyards broke ground in 2003 and the 35,000 square winery commenced operations in 2004. Located in the Yadkin Valley AVA, an American Viticultural Area, Childress' winemaker is Mark Friszolowski. Childress is part of a broader development of wine-grape growing and vineyards in North Carolina which has been gaining traction in the 21st Century, following a period of rapid growth beginning in the 1980s.

Grapes are grown locally on the vineyard grounds, at Childress' home estate, as well as purchased from local growers. Classic European varietals produced include Chardonnay, Pinot Gris, Sauvignon Blanc and Viognier white wines and Cabernet Franc, Cabernet Sauvignon, Merlot, Sangiovese and Syrah red wines, sparkling wines and dessert wines. In a nod to historic North American and North Carolina grape varieties, Childress also produces a line of muscadine (Vitis rotundifolia) wines, including a Scuppernong varietal, produced from a type of muscadine grape. Wines produced from scuppernong harken back to the 17th Century beginning of North Carolina's winemaking tradition. By 2005, the winery was producing 30,000 cases per year and was third largest in terms of production in North Carolina.

The vineyards are located at the intersection of U.S. Route 52 and U.S. Route 64 in Lexington, North Carolina which is in the Piedmont Triad region of North Carolina and its tasting room is open daily. There is also an Italian style Bistro open for lunch.

Childress also holds special events including weddings and corporate functions, as well as free entertainment during the spring and fall.

== See also ==
- North Carolina wine
- List of celebrities who own wineries and vineyards
- Richard Childress Racing
- Yadkin Valley Wine Festival
