= Elmer Ponder =

American baseball player (1893–1974)

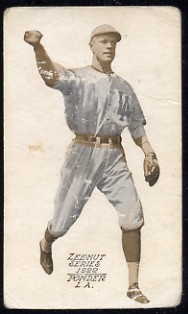
- Pitcher
- Born: June 26, 1893; Reed, Oklahoma Territory
- Died: April 20, 1974 (aged 80); Albuquerque, New Mexico, U.S.
- Batted: Right Threw: Right

MLB debut
- September 18, 1917, for the Pittsburgh Pirates

Last MLB appearance
- September 21, 1921, for the Chicago Cubs

MLB statistics
- Win–loss record: 17–27
- Earned run average: 3.21
- Strikeouts: 113
- Stats at Baseball Reference

Teams
- Pittsburgh Pirates (1917, 1919–1921); Chicago Cubs (1921)

Charles Elmer Ponder (June 26, 1893 – April 20, 1974) was an American professional baseball player. He was a right-handed major league pitcher (1917, 1919–21) with the Pittsburgh Pirates and Chicago Cubs. With the Pirates, he pitched a perfect 5 2/3 innings of relief in his first outing of the year, against the Philadelphia Phillies in the first game of a doubleheader on July 23; it would be 94 years until another member of the Pirates, Vin Mazzaro, threw 5 perfect innings of relief in 2013. In 1920, Ponder appeared in 33 games, with a record of 11–15. His earned run average (ERA) of 2.62, while not the best on the squad, was better than the team ERA of 2.89. He was an aviator and airplane mechanic in World War I in 1917 until the end of the war, and he returned to the Pirates a war hero.

In 1921, he was doing well with an ERA of 2.19 in 24 2/3 innings, when he was traded to the Chicago Cubs. His ERA with them went up to 4.74. He was of Cherokee descent and played with other famous Indian players of his generation such as Ben Shaw, Moses Yellow Horse, Bill Marriot and Virgil Cheeves. He joined the United States Army and served in World War I. For Elmer Ponder's baseball career, he compiled a 17–27 record, with a 3.21 earned run average, and 113 strikeouts in 378 2/3 innings pitched. Ponder recalled playing an exhibition game in Cuba with Babe Ruth as being a post-career highlight, along with his providing financing to former Indian ballplayers from his self-started Ponder Finance company, during a time banks would not provide financing to minorities. His father had owned a bank in Magnum, Oklahoma.

Ponder was alumnus of the University of Oklahoma, where he was a captain and second baseman of the baseball team and played for the basketball team. Ponder was born in Reed, Oklahoma Territory. He married silent film organist, Zelpha Gledhill, in San Diego, and they had two children. Elmer Ponder had a successful automobile and finance company in Albuquerque, New Mexico and he lived there with his wife, Zelpha, until his death at the age of 80.
