= Shelton Vineyards =

Vineyard in North Carolina

Coordinates: 36.3643°N 80.7686°W

- Location: Dobson, NC, USA
- Appellation: Yadkin Valley AVA
- Founded: 1994
- Key people: Charlie and Ed Shelton
- Varietals: Cabernet Franc, Cabernet Sauvignon, Chardonnay, Merlot, Pinot noir, Petit Verdot, Sauvignon blanc, Syrah, Viognier
- Tasting: Open to the Public
- Website: http://www.sheltonvineyards.com

Shelton Vineyards is a vineyard located in Dobson, North Carolina. Of over 95 North Carolina wineries, Shelton Vineyards is the largest family-owned estate winery in North Carolina. Located in the Yadkin Valley near Mount Airy, the estate is 406-acre (1.64 km^{2}) acres. The Shelton Vineyards' wines are reflective of the terroir of the Yadkin Valley.

== History ==
Shelton Vineyards is located in Dobson, North Carolina It took its present form for the first time in 1994, when Charlie and Ed Shelton bought the property that is just a few miles from where the two brothers grew up. They have a 33,000-square-foot (3,100 m^{2}) winery building and approximately 200-acre (0.81 km^{2}) acres of vines are planted in the vineyard. Located in the Yadkin Valley AVA, the vineyard shares a similar climate and growing season to several wine growing regions in Europe.

In 2002, they asked the BATF to name the Yadkin Valley as an American Viticultural Area. In 2003, it received final ATF approval, becoming the first AVA in North Carolina.

== Grapes ==
The list of grapes harvested includes:

- Cabernet Franc
- Cabernet Sauvignon
- Chardonnay
- Merlot
- Malbec
- Petit Verdot
- Riesling
- Sauvignon blanc
- Tannat
- Viognier
