= Yadkin Valley AVA =

American Viticultural Area in North Carolina

Yadkin Valley
- Wine region
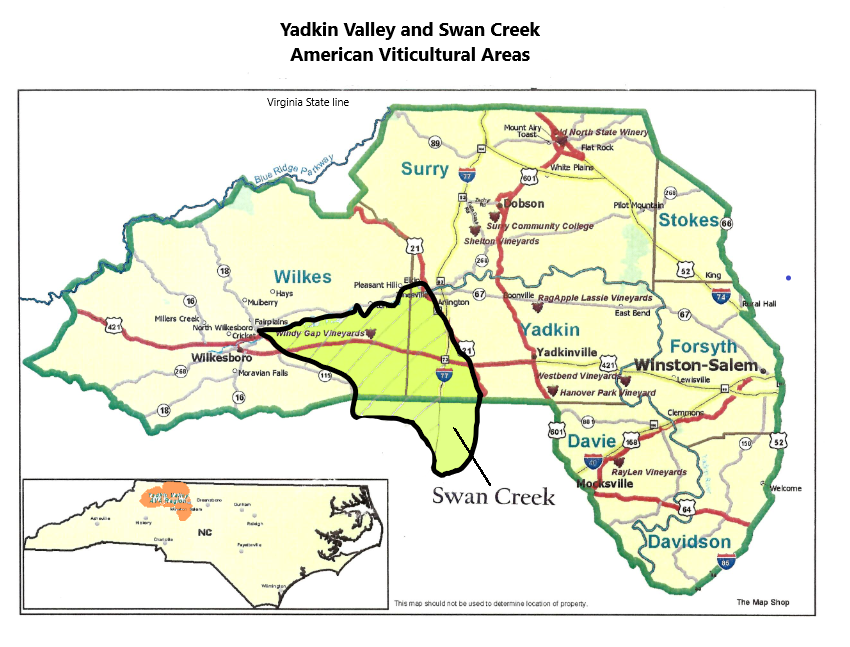
- Type: American Viticultural Area
- Year established: 2002
- Years of wine industry: 176
- Country: United States
- Part of: North Carolina
- Other regions in North Carolina: Appalachian High Country AVA, Haw River Valley AVA, Upper Hiwassee Highlands AVA, Crest of the Blue Ridge Henderson County AVA
- Sub-regions: Swan Creek AVA
- Growing season: 176 days
- Climate region: Region IV
- Heat units: 3743 GDD
- Precipitation (annual average): 46.22 in (1,173.99 mm)
- Soil conditions: Clayey or fine-loamy
- Total area: 1,416,600 acres (2,213 sq mi)
- Size of planted vineyards: 350 acres (142 ha)
- Grapes produced: Aleatico, Barbera, Cabernet Franc, Cabernet Sauvignon, Chambourcin, Chardonnay, Malbec, Malvasia, Merlot, Montepulciano, Muscat Canelli, Nebbiolo, Niagara, Petit Verdot, Pinot gris, Pinot noir, Riesling, Sangiovese, Vidal Blanc, Traminette, Cynthiana/Norton, Sauvignon blanc, Seyval blanc, Syrah, Vermentino, Viognier
- No. of wineries: 45+

Yadkin Valley is an American Viticultural Area (AVA) expanding across seven counties of northwestern North Carolina encompassing approximately 1,416,600 acres (2,213 sq mi) in the Yadkin River Valley. The appellation includes all of Wilkes, Surry, and Yadkin counties, and portions of Davie, Davidson, Forsyth, and Stokes counties. It was established as the nation's 147^{th} and the state's initial appellation on December 9, 2002 by the Bureau of Alcohol, Tobacco and Firearms (ATF), Treasury after reviewing the petition submitted by Patricia McRitchie of McRitchie Associates, LLC, on behalf of Shelton Vineyards, Inc., Dobson, North Carolina, to establish the initial viticultural area within the State of North Carolina, to be known as "Yadkin Valley." At the time, there were over 30 growers cultivating approximately 350 acres (142 ha) and three bonded wineries with at least two others under construction.

In 2008, Swan Creek was established as the state's second AVA, encompassing 96,000 acres (150 sq mi) with 60 percent of its northern region within the Yadkin Valley viticultural area and the remaining 40 percent extending beyond its southern boundary. The sub-AVA shared its name with the unincorporated community of Swan Creek in Yadkin County.

== History ==
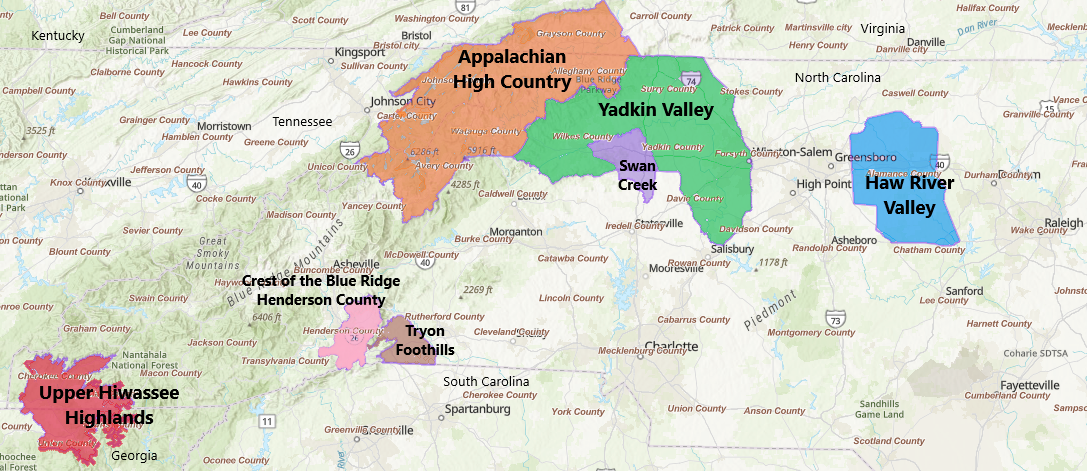
North Carolina's AVAs

There is rich historical and anthropological evidence of settlement and cultivation in the Yadkin Valley. Native American settlements date back to approximately 500 B.C. The viticultural area has been known as the Yadkin Valley since pre-colonial times. What is now Yadkin County was home to the Tutelo and Cheraw Indian tribes. The first known written use of the name Yadkin was in 1674 in the writing of an early trader, Abraham Wood, whose English scouts passed through the area in 1673. It was used in reference to the indigenous tribes found living along the river known as the Yadkin. The meaning of the word "Yadkin," derived from Yattken, or Yattkin, (/ˈjædkɪn/ YAD-kin), a Siouan Indian word, is unknown. In Siouan terminology it may mean "big tree" or "place of big trees." Subsequently, the name Yadkin was applied to many natural features and man-made structures in the area. In fact, the only references to Yadkin as a place name are to places located in North Carolina: the Yadkin Valley, the Yadkin River, Yadkin County, and the towns of Yadkinville and Yadkin College. It is also used to name businesses, schools, and organizations located in the State's northwestern Piedmont region.

The first non-Native settlers, the Moravians, arrived in the Yadkin Valley in the 1740s. They originally scouted land in the Blue Ridge Mountains near Boone, North Carolina, but did not find a satisfactory site for settlement. The Moravians followed the Yadkin River east, finally reaching the three forks of Muddy Creek, a tributary of the Yadkin River. It was here that they made the first settlements in what are now Forsyth and Stokes Counties. The settlements were Bethabara, established in 1753, and Bethania, established in 1759. Bethabara was a fortified settlement built to protect early settlers from attacks by Indians who swept down into the Yadkin Valley from the Blue Ridge Mountains during the French and Indian War. Smaller settlements throughout Wilkes, Yadkin and Iredell Counties were made during this period. These early settlers were meticulous recordkeepers and references to the Yadkin Valley can be found in their colonial writings as well as in later sources. References to the Yadkin Valley can also be found in histories of the region during the American Revolution and the Civil War periods. An influx of settlers who farmed the Valley's rich soil characterized the period immediately after the Civil War.

In the mid-19th Century, there were some 25 wineries in North Carolina, with extensive independent vineyards, to such an extent that North Carolina dominated the national market for American wines at the time. The Civil War ended that market dominance, through damage to the industry by loss of manpower and scarce capital, as well as through revocation of wine-making licenses due to regulatory retribution following the war. In the latter part of the 19th century, cotton and tobacco became the Valley's main crops. Wine production recovered in the decades after the war through the early 20th Century. However, North Carolina voted to become a dry state in 1908, and coupled with the onset of Prohibition, ended wine-making in North Carolina. Repeal in 1933, followed by the passage of laws by the North Carolina legislature in 1935 permitted wine-making, but it was several decades after World War II before North Carolina's wine industry would show significant growth.

After Prohibition, tobacco became the Valley's cash crop throughout the 20th Century. However, the predominance of tobacco growing in the northwest piedmont of North Carolina waned by the '90s. In its place was an increased interest in grape growing, which was rooted in pre-colonial North Carolina's history. The first cultivated wine grape in the United States was grown in North Carolina where the first recorded account of the Scuppernong grape is found in the logbook of explorer Giovanni da Verrazzano. He wrote in 1524, "Many vines growing naturally there [in North Carolina] that would no doubt yield excellent wines." North Carolina's wine industry thrived in the 19th and 20th centuries until Prohibition. At that time, the industry, centered in the eastern part of the State, was based on Muscadine wine.

One of the first modern major plantings of vinifera grapes in North Carolina occurred in 1972, when Jack Kroustalis established Westbend Vineyards, located in the Yadkin Valley. According to "Carolina Wine Country," "[t]he vines flourished in the rich soil of the Yadkin River Valley." In 1988, Kroustalis built the first bonded winery in the Yadkin Valley. Other growers in Yadkin Valley took note of Westbend Vineyard's success with vinifera grapes and followed suit. By the end of 2000, over 350 acres (142 ha) of grapes were planted in the Yadkin Valley. The North Carolina Department of Agriculture has recognized this area as a "unique and valuable winegrowing region." In 1999, Shelton Vineyards began planting 200 acres (81 ha) of vinifera grapes on land considered perfectly suited to vinifera grape growing. The following year, Shelton opened a state-of-the-art 30,000 case winery. There are currently two additional wineries under construction in the viticultural area, and the Yadkin Valley Wine Grower's Cooperative was recently incorporated. In 1999, Surry Community College began offering continuing education viticulture courses. Spurred on by the tremendous interest in grape growing, the college initiated a two-year viticulture program, which began in the fall of 2000. The program will educate future grape growers to take advantage of the favorable growing environment provided by the Yadkin Valley. In December 2000, the Golden LEAF Foundation awarded the college over $130,000 to support the establishment of a demonstration vineyard and winery for use by students in the program. The reference materials used to prepare this petition consistently included all of Wilkes, Surry, and Yadkin counties in the Yadkin Valley, as well as portions of Stokes and Forsyth counties. Davie and Iredell counties were also commonly included.

== Terroir ==
The Yadkin Valley area is in the piedmont and foothills of the Blue Ridge Mountains. One of the most recognizable landmarks in the AVA is Pilot Mountain. The USDA plant hardiness zones range from 6b to 8a. The AVA is mostly 7b and surrounding areas are in 6b and 7b well suited for growing grapes while the adjacent zones are not as favorable for growing vinifera grapes. For example, the Columbia Valley viticultural area in Washington State is also located in Zone 7a. The Yadkin Valley is located in the warm temperate latitude between 36′00″ and 36′30″ N. This is an area well suited to growing vinifera grapes while latitudes below 35′00″ are not suited to vinifera grape growing, according to Gordon S. Howell and Timothy K. Mansfield's article, Microclimate and the Grapevine: Site Selection for Vineyards (A Review), in Vinifera Wine Growers Journal, Fall 1977, 373.

=== Geology ===
The rocks and subsequent soils of the Blue Ridge and Piedmont Physiographic Provinces of the viticultural area have origins extending back to the early formation of the earth's continental landmasses. Some rocks of the subject area have been dated to approximately 1.8 billion years old. The geologic history is tremendously complex and involves plate tectonics (continental drift, continental collisions, subduction zones, intercontinental deformations) and the whole spectrum of uplifting and erosional wearing down for the entire mountain building cycle. Each of these cycles required several hundred million years during which the ongoing uplift and erosional wearing down processes were constantly active. The erosional cycle gradually reduces land surfaces from mountains to relatively level surfaces, gently sloping toward a depositional basin (ocean/sea). Geological evidence indicates at least three complete tectonic cycles, the last of which involved a collision and later separation of the Euro African Plate with the North American Plate. This produced a mountain range approximating the present day Andes Mountains of South America and eventually resulted in the creation of the Atlantic Ocean and the present-day plate positions. During a period of three hundred million years, following the build up of this original Appalachian Mountain system, the forces of weather and erosion have likely removed thousands of meters of rock with the resulting Piedmont and Blue Ridge surfaces of today. Evidence of three erosional cycles is represented by present-day mountain peaks, e.g., Mount Mitchell in North Carolina and Mount Rogers in Virginia. These peaks represent the oldest leveling cycle. The peaks of Kings Mountain, Pilot Mountain, Sauratown Mountain and the ridges of the Blue Ridge system represent the next erosional cycle. This middle cycle is definitely an older cycle (400,000,000 years) than the present-day Piedmont and Coastal Plain, which represent the third leveling cycle with their gentle sloping surface to the Atlantic Ocean. A current hypothesis is that the Appalachian Mountains and Piedmont are in a cycle where uplift is exceeding erosion by about 100 feet per 1,000,000 years for the Appalachian system of today. The highly complex rocks of the present day Blue Ridge and Piedmont provinces represent a core area that has been present and re-crystallized and re-metamorphosed through several of these mountain building cycles to produce the complex schists, gneisses and igneous rocks of today. Relics of a couple of the hot spots that re-crystallized rock are the granites of Mount Airy and Stone Mountain, North Carolina. The weathering of these Piedmont rocks has produced soils with chemical and physical properties that are very amenable to the viticulture industry. These soils and the climate of the Yadkin Valley viticultural area cover a spectrum that is equal to most vineyards of Europe and California. After the Yadkin River's origin and descent from mountain springs in the Blowing Rock, North Carolina area, it encounters a major structural feature known as the Brevard Shear Zone (fault system), which also defines the Blue Ridge Escarpment in the area, paralleled by the river. At the base of the Blue Ridge Escarpment, the Yadkin River turns and flows northeastward under the structural control of this shear zone for a distance of approximately 50 mi (80 km) before bending to the east between the northeast end of the Brushy Mountains and Pilot Mountain. At the Surry, Yadkin, and Forsyth County corner, the Yadkin turns southward and ends at its crossing of Interstate 85, the southern boundary about six miles northwest of Salisbury, North Carolina. South of Interstate 85, the river becomes a series of three lakes: High Rock, Badin, and Tillery. Beyond Lake Tillery, the river is referred to as the Pee Dee and continues from North Carolina into South Carolina and toward the Atlantic Ocean.

=== Climate ===
Data for precipitation, temperature and heat summation were provided by the State Climate Office of North Carolina. The Yadkin Valley has an average rainfall of 46.42 in (1,179.07 mm). The area to the west and northwest receives, on average, more than 68 in (1,700 mm) of rain per year. The area to the south and east receives, on average, 43.37 in (1,101.60 mm) of rain per year. In general, the Yadkin Valley receives less precipitation than the area to the west and northwest and slightly more than the areas to the south and the east.

The Yadkin Valley has average maximum annual temperatures of 69.85 °F (21.03 °C) and average minimum annual temperatures of 44.90 °F (7.17 °C). The area to the west-northwest has an average maximum temperature of 58.6 °F (14.8 °C) and an average minimum annual temperature of 40 °F (4 °C). The area to the east has an average maximum annual temperature of 68.4 °F (20.2 °C) and an average minimum annual temperature of 46 °F (8 °C). The area to the south has an average maximum annual temperature of 71.5 °F (21.9 °C) and an average minimum annual temperature of 48.1 °F (8.9 °C). In summary, the Yadkin Valley is much warmer than the area to the west and northwest and has slightly higher maximum and minimum temperatures than the area to the east. The Yadkin Valley has lower maximum and minimum temperatures than the area to the south. Temperature differences become more pronounced the further south one travels. In addition, as you proceed east past the Greensboro area, the temperatures, both maximum and minimum, become warmer than in the viticultural area. Using Amerine and Winkler heat summation definitions, the viticultural area is in climatic Region IV, with 3743 degree-days. The areas to the east are in Region IV. The area to the west-northwest is in Region I, and the area to the south is in Region V (Greensboro, NC is close to Region V). The data for the following analyses are taken from the North Carolina State University Horticulture Information Leaflet "Average Growing Season for Selected North Carolina Locations" (12/96, revised 12/98) by Katharine Perry. The viticultural area enjoys a frost-free season lasting from April 22 to October 15. This is a growing season of 176 days and is two to four weeks longer than the region to the west. The frost-free/growing season in the viticultural area is similar to the area immediately to the south. In contrast, the regions to the east-southeast have a frost-free and growing season four to six weeks longer than the viticultural area. Yadkin Valley has more moderate temperatures and precipitation than the surrounding regions. The growing season and frost-dates fall within the optimum range for cultivation of premium vinifera grapes.

=== Soil ===
The soils of the Yadkin Valley viticultural area are formed mainly from residuum (saprolite) weathered from felsic metamorphic rocks (gneisses, schists, and phyllites) of the Blue Ridge Geologic Belt and the Smith River Allochothon and from metamorphosed granitic rocks of the inner Piedmont Belt. The extreme southeastern part of the area is formed from saprolite weathered from igneous intrusive rocks (granites, gabbros and diorites) and some gneisses and schists, all of the Charlotte Belt. Most of the viticultural area is in the mesic soil temperature regime, which, at a depth of 20 in (51 cm), has an average annual soil temperature of 47 to 59 °F (8–15 °C). The extreme southeastern part of the area is in the thermic temperature regime, which is the 59 to 72 °F (15–22 °C) range. The dominant soil series formed from residuum in the mesic area are Fairview, Clifford, Woolwine, Westfield, Rhodhiss, and Toast soils. The dominant soil series formed from residuum in the thermic area are Pacolet, Cecil, Madison, Appling, and Wedowee soils. There are also some large areas of soils, which formed in old fluvial sediments of high stream terraces. These are the Braddock series in the mesic area and the Masada, Hiwassee, and Wickham series in the thermic area. These soils all have clayey or fine-loamy subsoils with good internal structure and moderate permeability. They are mostly very deep and well drained. These soils are acidic and have low natural fertility, requiring a well-structured fertility plan. The soil series that formed in residuum from the mafic intrusive rocks (gabbros and diorites), which occur scattered along the extreme southeastern part of the viticultural area, have slightly better natural fertility. However, they have subsoils with mixed mineralogy clays. The Gaston and Mecklenburg series have moderate or moderately slow permeability and are suitable to moderately suitable for viticulture. However, the Enon and Iredell series have high shrink-swell clayey subsoils, which perch water during wet periods and result in less than desirable internal drainage. The less than desirable, high shrink-swell clayey soils are more abundant to the south and east of the viticultural area. The Blue Ridge Mountains are to the west and north of the area. The petition contends that these limitations define the Yadkin Valley as a unique viticultural area.

== Viticulture ==
Yadkin Valley had a pre-Prohibition wine industry, when North Carolina produced the most wine than any other state in the nation, centered on the native Muscadine vine. The 18th Amendment prohibited the manufacture and sale of intoxicating liquors nationwide in 1920. Vineyards were uprooted in favor of tobacco and soybeans which became the cash crops. For decades, the area was a key tobacco-growing region. However, as tobacco farming and cigarette manufacturing in the area declined, some entrepreneurs, including tobacco farmers, transformed the fertile land to viticulture. The native grapes of this region of the southeastern United States include Vitis cordifolia, Vitis labrusca, Vitis aestivalis, Vitis cinerea, and Vitis rotundifolia (muscadine and scuppernong). Early attempts to grow the European wine grape, Vitis vinifera, in the southeastern United States, including 18th century efforts by Thomas Jefferson at Monticello, Virginia, had mixed success. But in the past two to three decades, viticultural research has helped these grapes to survive the climate, soil, and pests of the region. Additionally, Surry Community College, located in Dobson, served as a valuable community resource for the growing industry by offering certificate and degree programs in viticulture and enology. In 2005, Davidson County Community College formed a partnership with Surry Community College for the delivery of the viticulture and enology program/certifications in Davidson and Davie counties. In 2002, Charlie and Ed Shelton of Shelton Vineyards petitioned the ATF to recognize Yadkin Valley as an AVA, allowing winemakers to bottle wines with label indicating it was sourced from the Yadkin Valley. In 2005, the area's viticulture industry grew to 14 wineries and 400 acres (162 ha) of vineyards in the region. By 2013, there was 38 wineries operating in the Yadkin Valley. As of 2024, there are nearly 50 wineries resident in the appellation.

Decanter Magazine published a story featuring Yadkin Valley wineries in October 2021. Southern Living Magazine also featured North Carolina's viticulture industry and Yadkin Valley wineries in November 2007.

The Yadkin Valley Wine Festival is traditionally held the third Saturday in May at the Municipal Park in Elkin. The Yadkin Valley Grape Festival is held the third Saturday in October in Yadkinville. Prior to 2005, these wineries also participated in the North Carolina Wine Festival. The Budbreak Wine and Craft Beer Festival is usually held in downtown Mount Airy on the first Saturday in May.

== Vineyards and Wineries ==
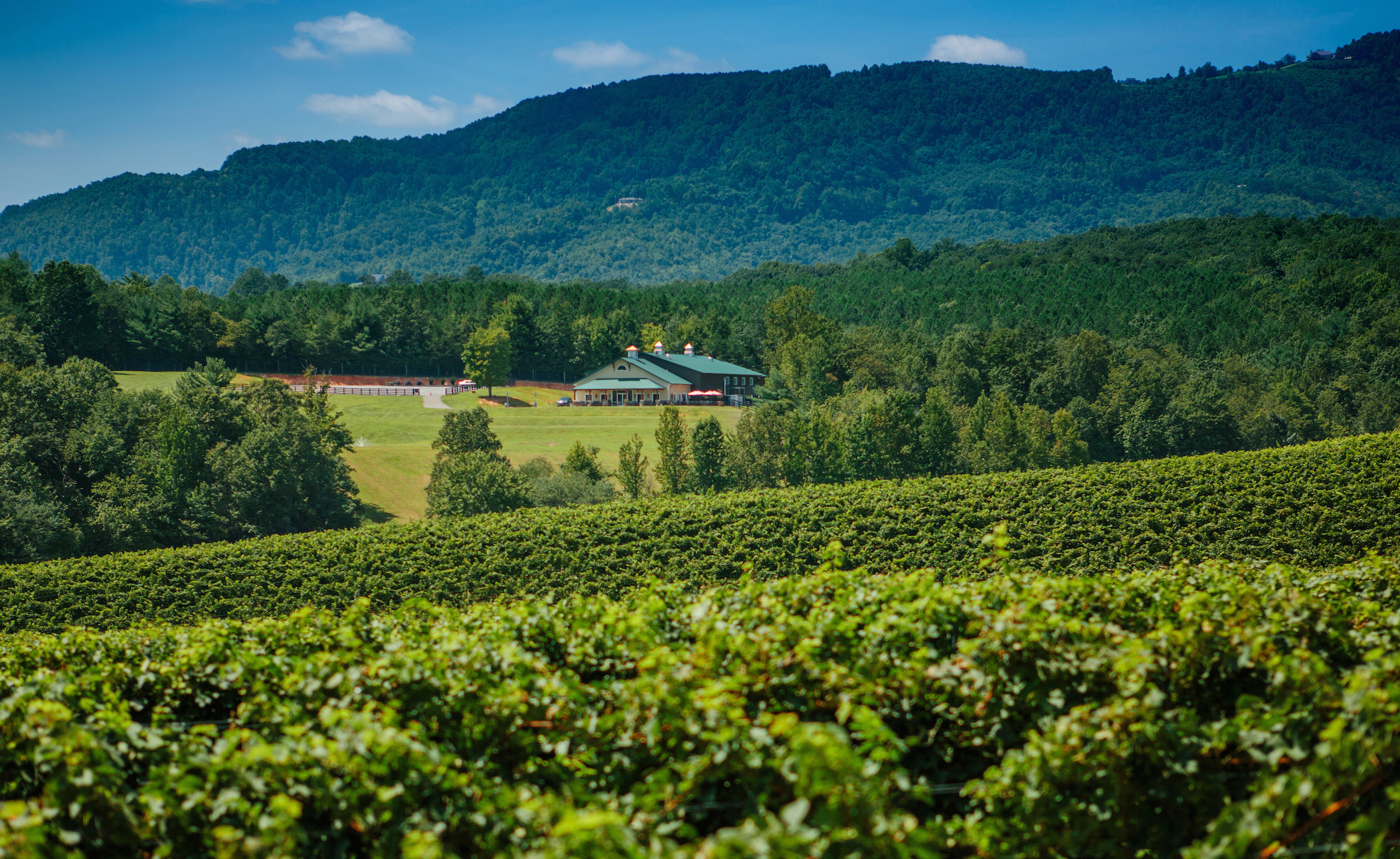
Jones Von Drehle Vineyards

- Adagio Vineyards
- Brandon Hills Vineyard
- Carolina Heritage
- Castello Barone
- Cellar 4201
- Childress Vineyards
- Christian Paul Vineyards
- Curran Alexander
- Divine Llama
- Dobbins Creek Vineyards
- Dynamis Estate Wines
- Elkin Creek Vineyard
- Golden Road Vineyards
- Grassy Creek Vineyard & Winery
- Hanover Park
- Haze Gray Vineyards
- Hidden Vineyard
- JOLO Winery & Vineyards
- Jones von Drehle Vineyards
- Junius Lindsay
- Laurel Gray Vineyards
- Lazy Elm Vineyards
- McRitchie Winery & Ciderworks
- Medaloni Cellars
- MenaRick Vineyards
- Midnight Magdalena Vineyards
- Native Vines Winery
- Old North State Winery
- Piccione Vineyards
- Raffaldini Vineyards
- RagApple Lassie Winery
- Rayson Winery and Vineyards
- Roaring River Vineyards
- Round Peak
- Sanders Ridge Winery
- Serre Vineyards
- Shadow Springs Vineyard
- Shelton Vineyards
- Slightly Askew Winery
- Sotrio Vineyards
- Stardust Cellars
- Stony Knoll Vineyards
- Surry Cellars
- Weathervane Winery
- Windsor Run Cellars
