= Reed, Oklahoma =

- Unincorporated community
- Location within the state of Oklahoma Reed (the United States)
- Coordinates: 34°54′2″N 99°41′44″W
- Country: United States
- State: Oklahoma
- County: Greer
- Elevation: 1,742 ft (531 m)
- Time zone: UTC-6 (Central (CST))
  - Summer (DST): UTC-5 (CDT)
- ZIP codes: 73554
- GNIS feature ID: 1097145

Reed is an unincorporated community in Greer County, Oklahoma, United States, located along State Highway 9 at North County Road 1840. The ZIP Code is 73554. The post office opened September 16, 1892. Reed was said to have been named for the first postmaster, John Reed Graham.

Jay Buckle Springs, a locally famous watering hole on the National Register of Historic Places listings in Greer County, Oklahoma, is north of Reed just east of North County Road 1840, 500 feet north of its junction with East County Road 1420. The Springs are named after the Jay Buckle Ranch which had its headquarters nearby.

== Notable people ==
Marvin Hatley Film composer was born in Reed.
Elmer Ponder Major League Baseball player was born in Reed.
William Thomas Ponder World War I Flying Ace was born in Reed.
