= Yadkin Valley Wine Festival =

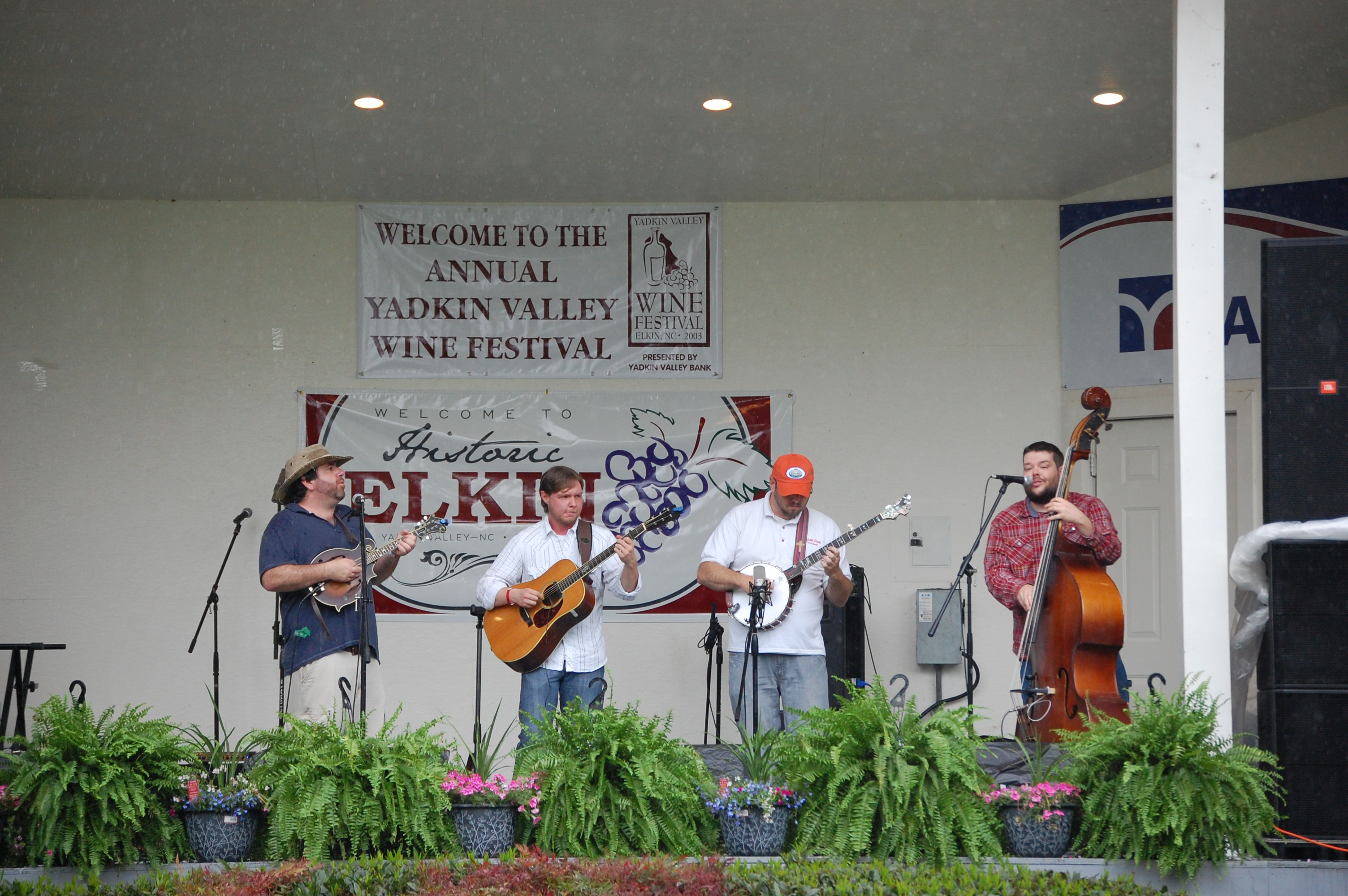
Bluegrass music at the festival

The Yadkin Valley Wine Festival is an annual wine festival held on the third Saturday of May at Elkin Municipal Park in Elkin, North Carolina. Vineyards in the Yadkin Valley AVA are exclusively featured in this one-day festival. Thirty wineries and vineyards participated in the 2013 festival.

== History ==
The festival began in 2001. The event is free and open to the public, but there is a single fee for those tasting, buying, or consuming festival wine. The fee covers all vendors for the event and includes entertainment. A number of food and non-alcoholic refreshments are provided, as is entertainment.

The event is held the 3rd Saturday of May each year at the Elkin Municipal Park in Elkin, North Carolina.

== See also ==
- Wine festival
- North Carolina wine
- List of festivals in the United States
