= Oakley (Gallatin, Tennessee) =

Historic house in Tennessee, United States

- U.S. National Register of Historic Places
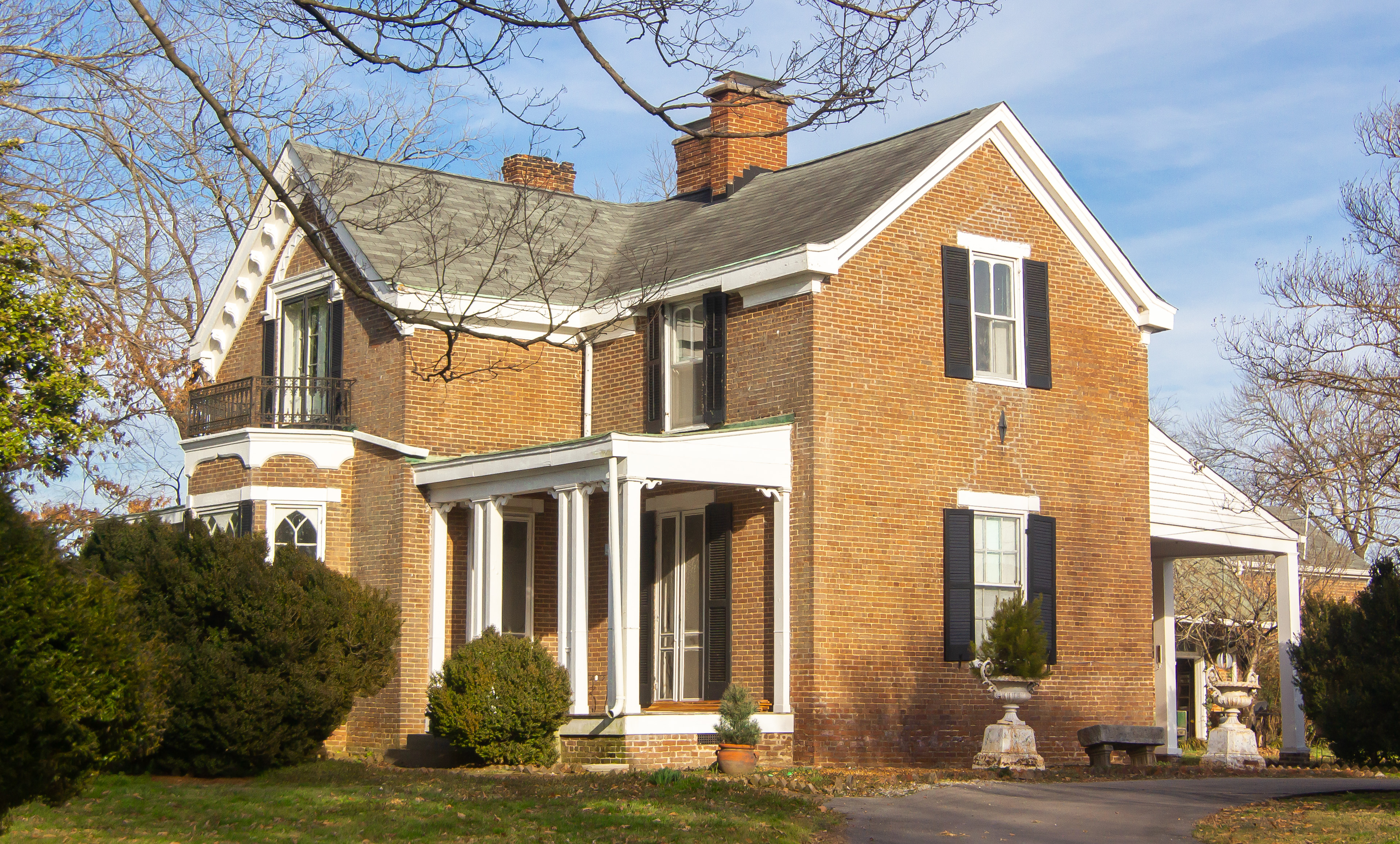

- Location within Tennessee Location within the United States
- Nearest city: Gallatin, Tennessee
- Coordinates: 36°21′9″N 86°30′27″W
- Area: 1.8 acres (0.73 ha)
- Built: 1852
- Architect: Strickland, William
- Architectural style: Gothic Revival
- NRHP reference No.: 85001615
- Added to NRHP: July 25, 1985

Oakley, also been known as the Dr. John W. Franklin House, is a historic house near Gallatin, Tennessee, overlooking Old Hickory Lake. It was built in 1852 to a design by architect William Strickland. Oakley was listed on the National Register of Historic Places in 1985. The listing included two contributing buildings and a contributing structure on 1.8 acres (0.73 ha).

The property is privately owned. It has served as the home and studio of local artist Frank Gee.
