= Franklin Apartments =

- U.S. National Register of Historic Places
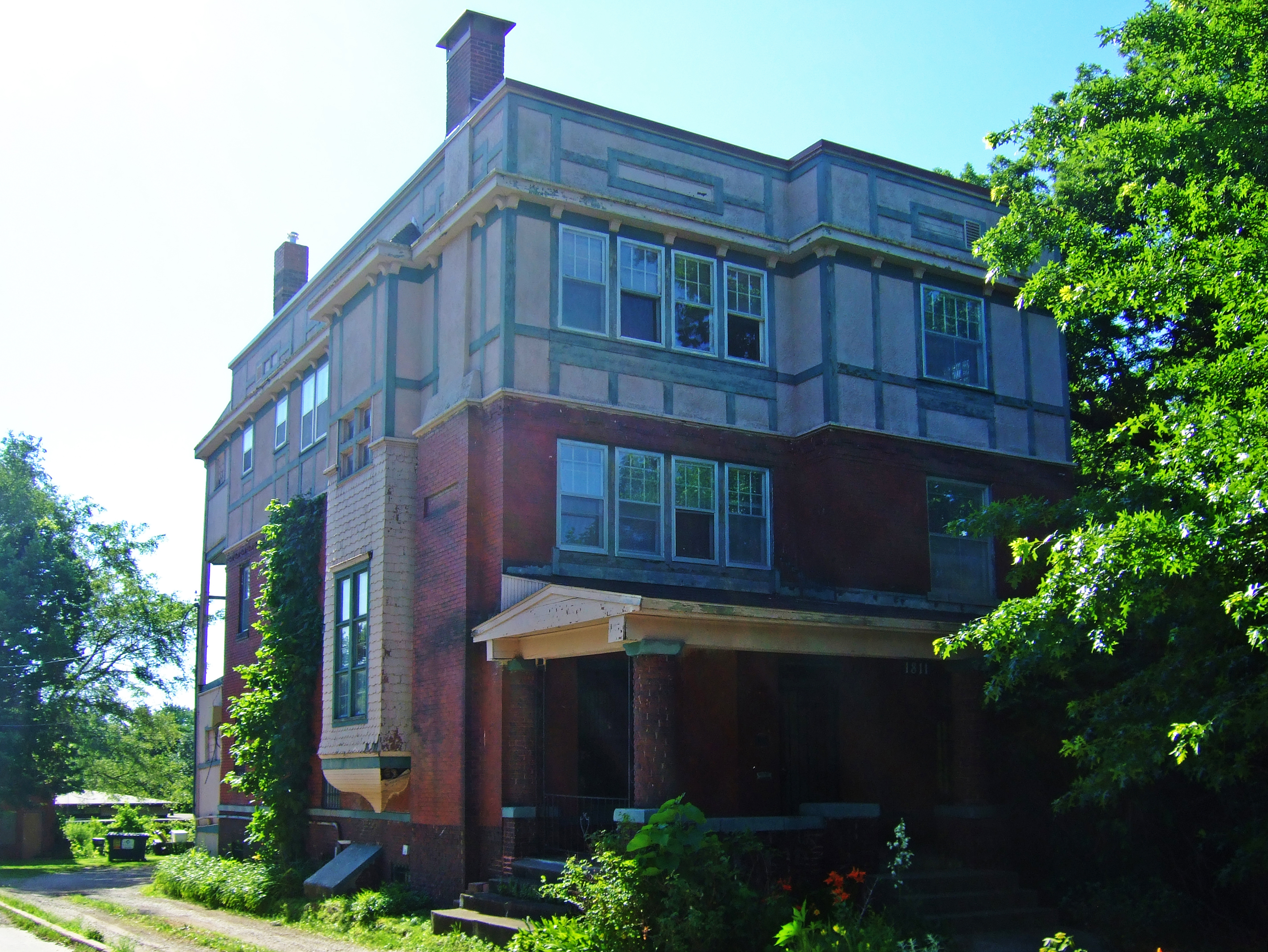

- Location within Iowa Location within the United States
- Location: 1811 6th Ave. Des Moines, Iowa
- Coordinates: 41°35′47.4″N 93°37′40.1″W
- Area: less than one acre
- Built: 1897
- Architect: Morrison & Thorne
- Architectural style: Queen Anne
- MPS: Towards a Greater Des Moines MPS
- NRHP reference No.: 96001142
- Added to NRHP: October 25, 1996

Franklin Apartments, also known as the Rood House, Antes House, and the Coffin Apartments, is a historic building located in Des Moines, Iowa, United States. The building was constructed as a single-family dwelling for the Rood family in 1896. It was converted into a seven unit apartment building in 1914, and then substantially remodeled four years later by Frank B. Coffin into a three unit apartment building. The building is located on Sixth Avenue, which by the turn of the 20th century had become a major route utilized by vehicular traffic and streetcar lines. Its proximity to this transportation corridor illustrates the emergence of higher and denser residential use in this area of Des Moines. The apartment building was listed on the National Register of Historic Places in 1996.
