= Greer County Courthouse =

- U.S. National Register of Historic Places
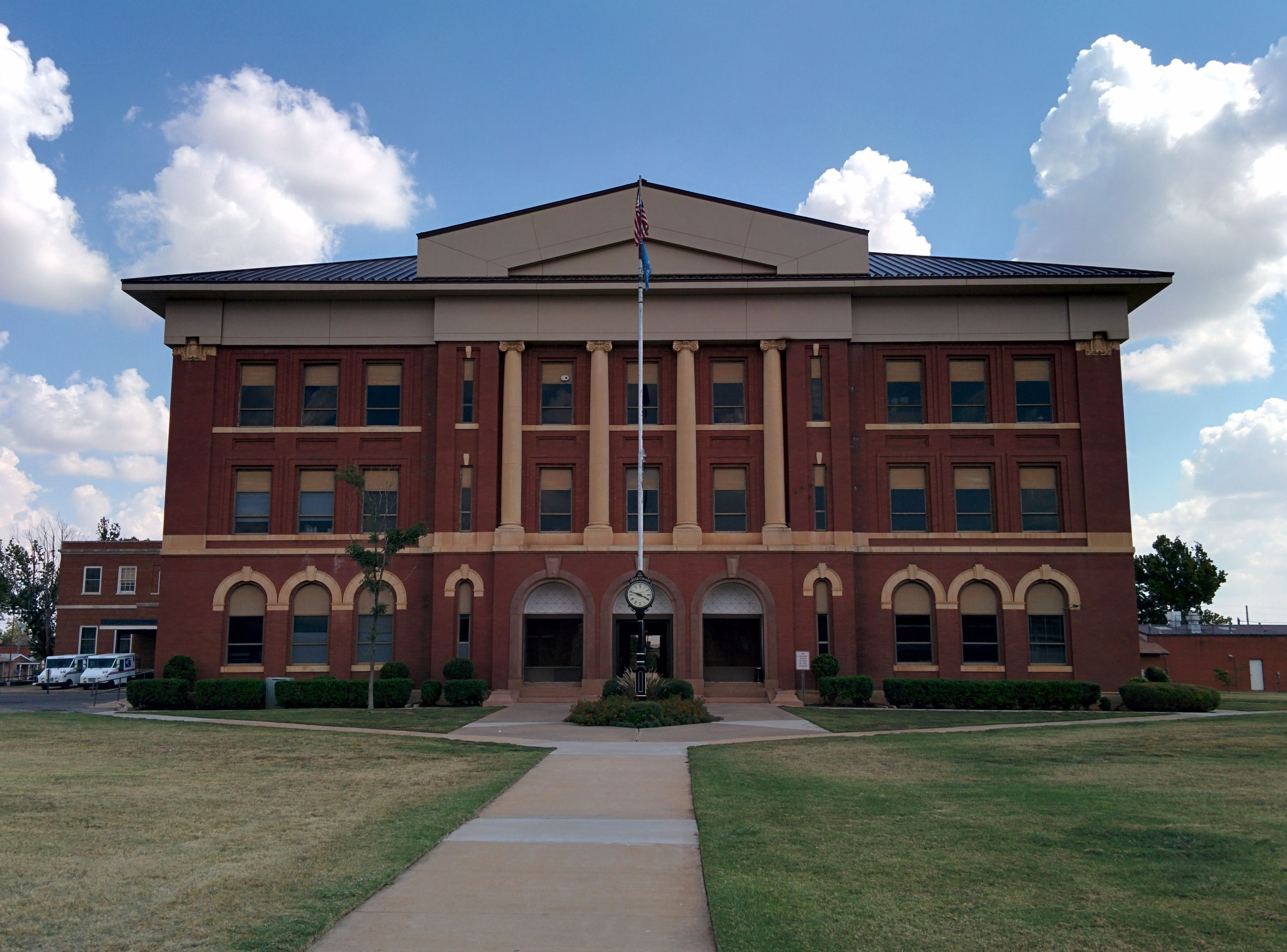

- Location within Oklahoma Location within the United States
- Interactive map showing the location of Greer County Courthouse
- Location: Courthouse Sq., Mangum, Oklahoma
- Coordinates: 34°52′22″N 99°30′17″W
- Area: 4 acres (1.6 ha)
- Built: 1906
- Built by: A.D. Campbell and Z.F. Lee
- Architect: Layton, S.A.
- MPS: County Courthouses of Oklahoma TR
- NRHP reference No.: 85000682
- Added to NRHP: March 22, 1985

The Greer County Courthouse, on Courthouse Sq. in Mangum, Oklahoma, is a courthouse which was built in 1906. It was listed on the National Register of Historic Places in 1985.

It is a three-story red brick building with granite and limestone trim. It was built with an "elaborate copper-covered dome centered on the top, but. [sic] it was removed in the 1940s because the weight of the dome caused structural damage to the building."
