= Dobson, North Carolina =

- Town
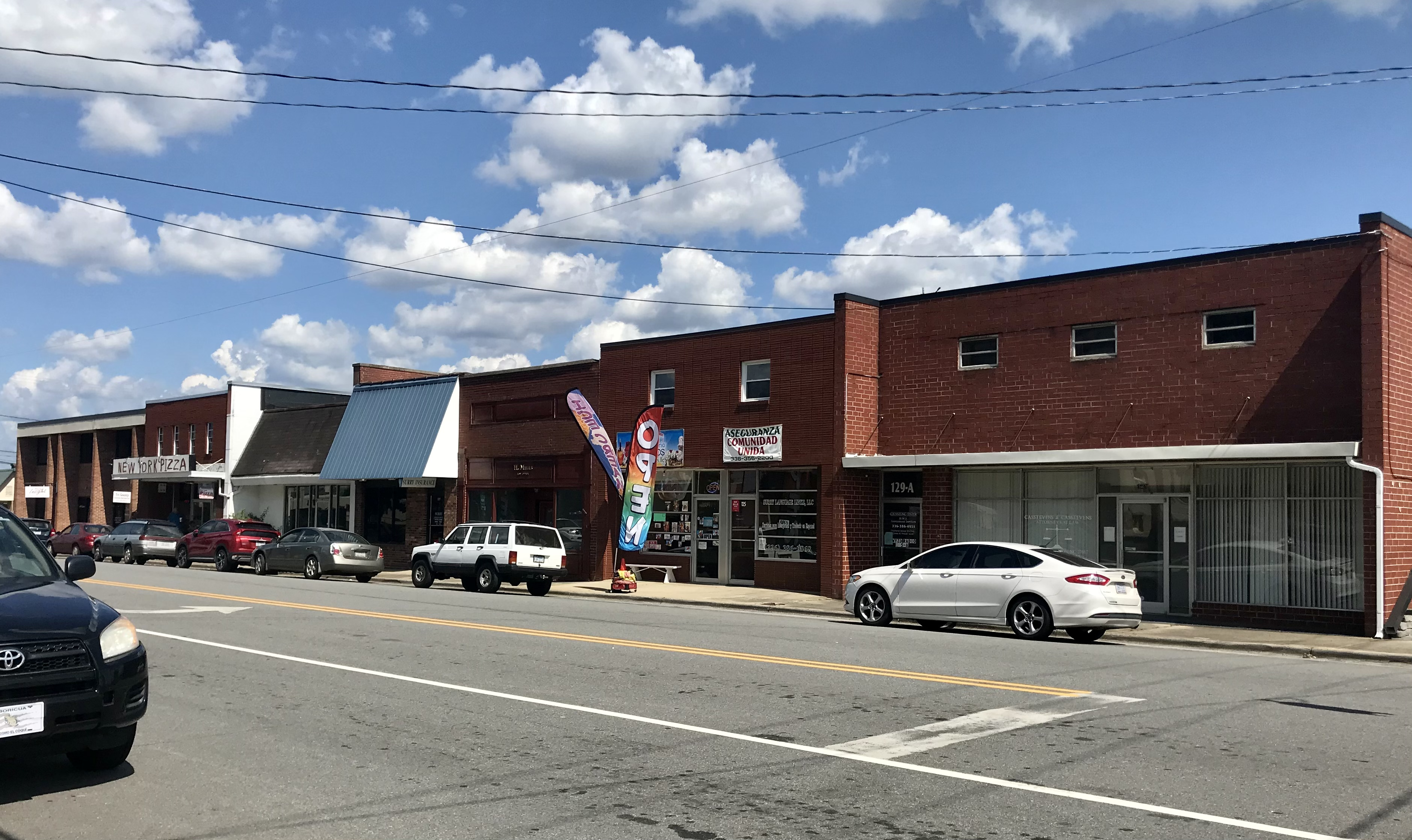
- West Atkins Street

- Seal

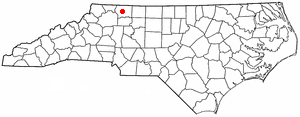
- Location of Dobson, North Carolina
- Coordinates: 36°23′34″N 80°43′28″W
- Country: United States
- State: North Carolina
- County: Surry
- Established: 1891

Government
  - Type: Local/Municipal
  - Mayor: Ricky Draughn
  - Town Manager: Laura Neely

Area
  - Total: 2.04 sq mi (5.29 km^{2})
  - Land: 2.03 sq mi (5.26 km^{2})
  - Water: 0.012 sq mi (0.03 km^{2})
- Elevation: 1,230 ft (370 m)

Population (2020)
  - Total: 1,462
  - Density: 719.9/sq mi (277.97/km^{2})
- Time zone: UTC-5 (Eastern (EST))
  - Summer (DST): UTC-4 (EDT)
- ZIP code: 27017
- Area code: 336
- FIPS code: 37-17340
- GNIS feature ID: 2406382
- Website: www.dobson-nc.com

Dobson is a town and the county seat in Dobson Township, Surry County, North Carolina, United States. As of the 2020 census, the town population was 1,396. Dobson is the home of the Shelton Vineyards, the largest winery in North Carolina. It is also home to a significant Latino population due to the large number of farms in the area. The main crops in the area are corn, tobacco and soy beans.

== History ==
Dobson was established as the county seat in 1853, replacing Rockford after all land in Surry County south of the Yadkin River was used to form Yadkin County.

The Edwards-Franklin House and Surry County Courthouse are listed on the National Register of Historic Places.

== Geography ==
According to the United States Census Bureau, the town has a total area of 1.8 square miles (4.7 km^{2}), all land.

== Demographics ==
Historical population
Census	Pop.	Note	%±
1900	327		—
1910	360		10.1%
1920	368		2.2%
1930	446		21.2%
1940	520		16.6%
1950	609		17.1%
1960	684		12.3%
1970	933		36.4%
1980	1,222		31.0%
1990	1,195		−2.2%
2000	1,457		21.9%
2010	1,586		8.9%
2020	1,462		−7.8%
2021 (est.)	1,390	▼	−4.9%
U.S. Decennial Census

=== 2020 census ===
Dobson racial composition
Race	Number	Percentage
White (non-Hispanic)	1,062	72.64%
Black or African American (non-Hispanic)	64	4.38%
Native American	9	0.62%
Asian	30	2.05%
Other/Mixed	40	2.74%
Hispanic or Latino	257	17.58%

As of the 2020 United States census, there were 1,462 people, 657 households, and 327 families residing in the town.

=== 2000 census ===
As of the census of 2000, there were 1,457 people, 555 households, and 339 families living in the town. The population density was 813.8 inhabitants per square mile (314.2/km^{2}). There were 594 housing units at an average density of 331.8 per square mile (128.1/km^{2}). The racial makeup of the town was 75.84% White, 3.91% African American, 0.41% Native American, 19.42% from other races, and 0.41% from two or more races. Hispanic or Latino of any race were 25.81% of the population.

There were 555 households, out of which 29.2% had children under the age of 18 living with them, 45.6% were married couples living together, 9.4% had a female householder with no husband present, and 38.9% were non-families. 33.7% of all households were made up of individuals, and 18.4% had someone living alone who was 65 years of age or older. The average household size was 2.37 and the average family size was 3.03.

In the town, the population was spread out, with 23.0% under the age of 18, 11.9% from 18 to 24, 29.0% from 25 to 44, 18.9% from 45 to 64, and 17.2% who were 65 years of age or older. The median age was 35 years. For every 100 females, there were 108.1 males. For every 100 females age 18 and over, there were 100.0 males.

The median income for a household in the town was $26,765, and the median income for a family was $34,792. Males had a median income of $22,050 versus $21,000 for females. The per capita income for the town was $19,346. About 17.8% of families and 23.3% of the population were below the poverty line, including 28.6% of those under age 18 and 22.9% of those age 65 or over.

== Notable people ==
- William Wade Hampton (1858–1930), state senator and state representative
- Caleb V. Haynes, United States Air Force major general, air pioneer
- Tabitha Ann Holton, became the first licensed female lawyer in the Southern United States in 1878. She practiced law in Dobson from 1878 to 1886.
- Roy H. Park, broadcaster and publisher

== See also ==
- Shelton Vineyards
