= Mangum, Oklahoma =

- City
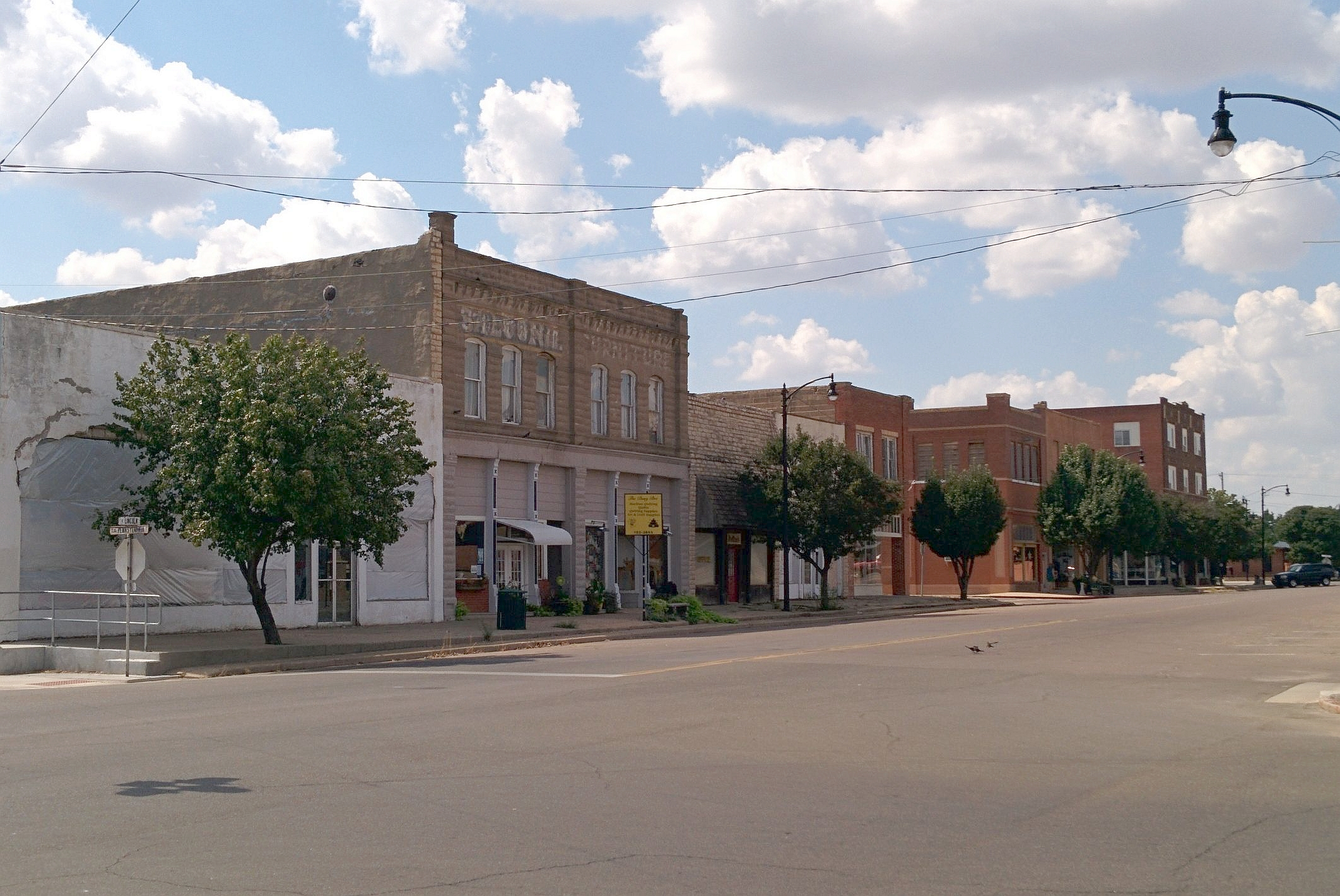
- Mangum, Oklahoma Downtown Historic District, September 28, 2014. Courtesy CrimsonEdge

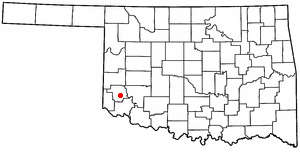
- Location of Mangum, Oklahoma
- Coordinates: 34°52′43″N 99°30′14″W
- Country: United States
- State: Oklahoma
- County: Greer

Area
  - Total: 1.68 sq mi (4.36 km^{2})
  - Land: 1.68 sq mi (4.36 km^{2})
  - Water: 0 sq mi (0.00 km^{2})
- Elevation: 1,608 ft (490 m)

Population (2020)
  - Total: 2,762
  - Density: 1,640.7/sq mi (633.47/km^{2})
- Time zone: UTC-6 (Central (CST))
  - Summer (DST): UTC-5 (CDT)
- ZIP code: 73554
- Area code: 580
- FIPS code: 40-46050
- GNIS feature ID: 2410917
- Website: City website

Mangum is a city in and the county seat of Greer County, Oklahoma, United States. The population was 2,762 as of the 2020 United States census. Mangum was originally part of Old Greer County in the Texas panhandle. The community was named for A. S. Mangum, who owned the land on which the town was founded in 1882. (Note: A. S. Mangum is notable in Texas history because he fought at the Battle of San Jacinto. Texas rewarded his service to the state with a land grant in Greer County.) It became part of the Oklahoma Territory in 1896, and thus part of the state of Oklahoma on November 16, 1907.

== History ==
Beginning in 1876, the nearby Great Western Cattle Trail was used to drive cattle north from Texas to market. The community of Mangum began in 1882 when Henry Clay Sweet established it on land granted to A. S. Mangum by the state of Texas. The Mangum post office was established April 15, 1886. This part of Texas (old Greer County) was given to Oklahoma in 1896. During Mangum's early days, the community's economy largely depended on very large cattle ranches owned or leased by land companies such as the Day Land and Cattle Company of Texas and the Franklyn Land and Cattle Company, an English syndicate. The local cowboys called Mangum "Tin City" because so many tin cans were unrolled and nailed over the wooden planks that served as sidewalks.

The Kiser Salt Works, named for owner Ben Kiser and located on the Elm Fork of the Red River was one of the earliest production operations in what would become western Oklahoma. (Note: The Minerals Handbook suggests that salt production began about 1914 in Harmon County, Oklahoma (originally part of Old Greer County))

Other early businesses in or around Mangum included the Oklahoma Granite Company, which opened in 1904, the Mangum Star newspaper, first published in 1887, and the Mangum Brick Plant, established in 1903 by D. J. Doyle. The newspaper still publishes in the 21st century. The brick plant, now owned by Jed Winters, also still operates and has greatly expanded production.

By statehood, Mangum had a population of 2,672. It had two school buildings, an opera house and a county courthouse later listed in the National Register of Historical Places, NR 85000682. By 1930, the population had expanded to 4,806 (the highest recorded in the U.S. census). Agriculture had largely displaced the old cattle ranches, so the city could also boast of seven cotton gins, one cotton oil mill, one cotton compress, and one flour mill.

The Chicago, Rock Island and Pacific Railroad (aka Rock Island or CRI&P) built a line from Chickasha, Oklahoma to Mangum in 1900. The Wichita Falls and Northwestern Railway, acquired by the Missouri, Kansas and Texas Railway (also known as M-K-T or Katy) in 1911, operated its own line through Mangum by 1910.

Mangum is home to the fifth longest-lasting light bulb, located in a fire house installed around 1926–1929, according to Guinness World Records. It burnt out on Friday, December 13, 2019 after a power outage, as it was not attached to any special electrical supply.

Mangum is the setting for the 2008 movie Beer for My Horses, starring Toby Keith and Rodney Carrington.

On May 20, 2019, Western Mangum was hit hard by a destructive EF2 tornado during a tornado outbreak that impacted central Oklahoma. When the tornado entered Mangum, the tornado damaged the roof of an apartment building before dissipating.

In 2020, during the COVID-19 pandemic Mangum made national news when a local church was instrumental in spreading COVID-19 throughout the town, resulting in several fatalities. The Mayor at the time, Mary Jane Scott, put the town on lockdown following direction from state governor Kevin Stitt. After the lockdown was lifted and many states reopened, the safety measures in place in Mangum were also removed.

== Geography ==
According to the United States Census Bureau, the city has a total area of 1.8 square miles (4.7 km^{2}), all land.

Lake Altus-Lugert is to the east-northeast.

=== Climate ===
Mangum, Oklahoma's climate is humid subtropical (Köppen Cfa, Trewartha Cf), giving the area mild winters and hot, humid summers. Mangum is in USDA Plant Hardiness Zone 7a, strongly suggesting that the coldest night of each year averages between 0 °F (-18 °C) and 5 °F (-15 °C).

On February 11, 2017, Mangum reached a high of 99.41 °F (37.45 °C). This is the Oklahoma state record high for meteorological winter (December through February). What's even more remarkable is that this occurred just three days before snow fell on Mangum.

Climate data for Mangum, Oklahoma (1981-2010 normals)
Month	Jan	Feb	Mar	Apr	May	Jun	Jul	Aug	Sep	Oct	Nov	Dec	Year
Mean daily maximum °F (°C)	52 (11)	56 (13)	65 (18)	75 (24)	83 (28)	91 (33)	96 (36)	95 (35)	87 (31)	76 (24)	63 (17)	52 (11)	74 (23)
Daily mean °F (°C)	39 (4)	43 (6)	51 (11)	60 (16)	75 (24)	79 (26)	83 (28)	82 (28)	74 (23)	62 (17)	50 (10)	39 (4)	61 (16)
Mean daily minimum °F (°C)	25 (−4)	29 (−2)	36 (2)	45 (7)	56 (13)	66 (19)	69 (21)	68 (20)	60 (16)	48 (9)	36 (2)	26 (−3)	47 (8)
Average precipitation inches (mm)	1.00 (25)	1.19 (30)	1.89 (48)	2.45 (62)	3.79 (96)	4.33 (110)	2.15 (55)	2.93 (74)	2.86 (73)	2.74 (70)	1.53 (39)	1.08 (27)	27.94 (710)
Source: "Monthly Average Temperatures and Precipitation in Mangum". U.S. climate data.

== Demographics ==
Historical population
Census	Pop.	Note	%±
1910	3,067		—
1920	3,405		11.0%
1930	4,806		41.1%
1940	4,193		−12.8%
1950	4,271		1.9%
1960	3,950		−7.5%
1970	4,066		2.9%
1980	3,833		−5.7%
1990	3,344		−12.8%
2000	2,924		−12.6%
2010	3,010		2.9%
2020	2,762		−8.2%
U.S. Decennial Census

=== 2020 census ===
As of the 2020 census, Mangum had a population of 2,762. The median age was 40.0 years. 25.9% of residents were under the age of 18 and 20.7% of residents were 65 years of age or older. For every 100 females there were 90.4 males, and for every 100 females age 18 and over there were 88.1 males age 18 and over.

0% of residents lived in urban areas, while 100.0% lived in rural areas.

There were 1,127 households in Mangum, of which 31.3% had children under the age of 18 living in them. Of all households, 38.2% were married-couple households, 19.3% were households with a male householder and no spouse or partner present, and 35.8% were households with a female householder and no spouse or partner present. About 34.3% of all households were made up of individuals and 19.7% had someone living alone who was 65 years of age or older.

There were 1,480 housing units, of which 23.9% were vacant. Among occupied housing units, 68.0% were owner-occupied and 32.0% were renter-occupied. The homeowner vacancy rate was 5.4% and the rental vacancy rate was 17.6%.

Racial composition as of the 2020 census
Race	Percent
White	79.6%
Black or African American	4.6%
American Indian and Alaska Native	2.0%
Asian	0.1%
Native Hawaiian and Other Pacific Islander	0%
Some other race	4.5%
Two or more races	9.2%
Hispanic or Latino (of any race)	15.9%

=== 2000 census ===
As of the 2000 census, there were 2,924 people, 1,236 households, and 765 families residing in the city. The population density was 1,673.2 inhabitants per square mile (646.0/km^{2}). There were 1,553 housing units at an average density of 888.7 per square mile (343.1/km^{2}). The racial makeup of the city was 84.44% White, 6.74% African American, 1.37% Native American, 0.10% Asian, 4.51% from other races, and 2.84% from two or more races. Hispanic or Latino of any race were 8.41% of the population.

There were 1,236 households, out of which 25.9% had children under the age of 18 living with them, 47.0% were married couples living together, 11.2% had a female householder with no husband present, and 38.1% were non-families. 36.0% of all households were made up of individuals, and 23.2% had someone living alone who was 65 years of age or older. The average household size was 2.25 and the average family size was 2.92.

In the city, the population was spread out, with 23.8% under the age of 18, 8.1% from 18 to 24, 21.7% from 25 to 44, 22.9% from 45 to 64, and 23.4% who were 65 years of age or older. The median age was 42 years. For every 100 females, there were 89.1 males. For every 100 females age 18 and over, there were 85.1 males.

The median income for a household in the city was $25,064, and the median income for a family was $30,547. Males had a median income of $26,250 versus $16,198 for females. The per capita income for the city was $13,392. About 20.2% of families and 24.2% of the population were below the poverty line, including 33.3% of those under age 18 and 19.5% of those age 65 or over.

== Arts and culture ==
Cultural attractions include the Old Greer County Museum and Pioneer Hall of Fame, which occupies a 1907 hospital building and features over 60 rooms of artifacts relevant to the history of Old Greer County. The hospital was built by Dr. Fowler Border before Oklahoma reached statehood.

The Margaret Carder Library, founded in 1922, contains 14,318 volumes and circulates 11,794 items per year.

The annual Mangum Rattlesnake Derby, typically in April, features not only a rattlesnake hunt, but also a festival and large flea market.

=== Historical Sites ===
Locations in Mangum listed on the National Register of Historic Places listings in Greer County, Oklahoma include:

- Downtown Mangum Historic District
- Greer County Courthouse
- Hotel Franklin
- Mangum Armory
- Mangum Community Building

== Government ==
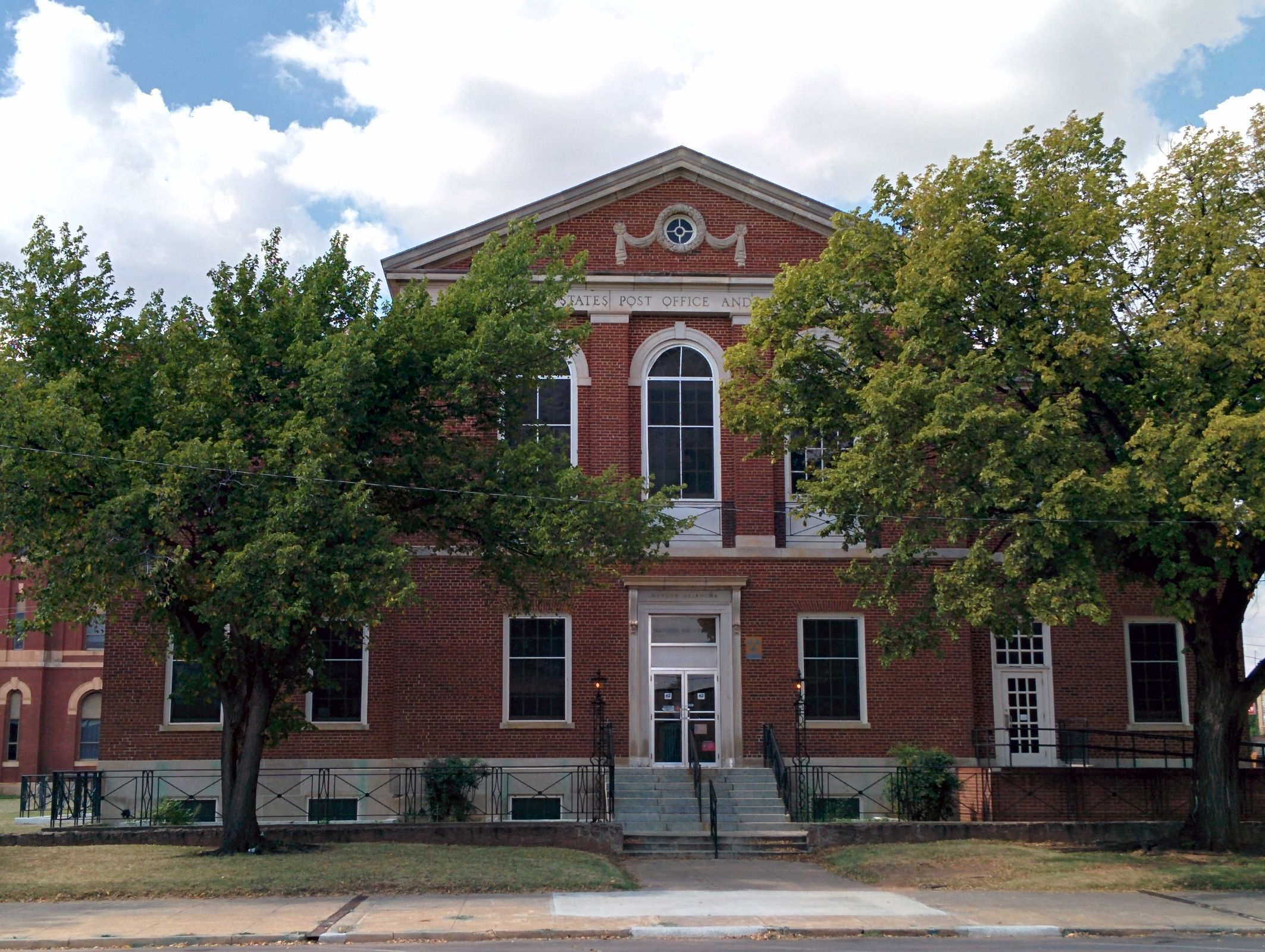
Post office

Mangum is governed by a city commission and a City Manager.

- Mayor - Mary Jane Scott
- Finance Commissioner - Ron Gay
- Police and Fire Commissioner - Marsha Griswold
- Public Highways Commissioner -Travis Reese
- Utility Commissioner - Ronnie Webb are the Trustees of the Mangum Utility Authority and the Trustees of the Mangum Hospital Authority.

== Infrastructure ==
=== Transportation ===
==== Highways ====
Mangum is served by U.S. Route 283, as well as Oklahoma State Highway 34. Oklahoma State Highway 9 connects just north of town.

==== Air ====
Mangum has a civil airport named Scott Field located on the western edge of the city, about 2 miles (3.2 km) from the city center. No scheduled passenger airlines serve this airport.

Commercial air service is available at Lawton–Fort Sill Regional Airport about 81 miles east-southeast, or the larger Rick Husband Amarillo International Airport, about 139 miles to the west-northwest.

==== Rail ====
There is no passenger rail service to or from Mangum.

== Notable people ==
- Margaret Avery, actress and singer
- G. A. Brown, judge
- James P. Garrett, justice of the Oklahoma Court of Civil Appeals.
- Clyde Hendrick, dean of Texas Tech University graduate school.
- Braden Looper, professional baseball player
- Gale McArthur, college basketball player
- Gary McSpadden, pastor and award-winning Gospel Music Hall of Fame singer and producer
- Blake Ragsdale Van Leer, president of Georgia Institute of Technology
