= Edwards–Franklin House =

Historic house in North Carolina, United States

- U.S. National Register of Historic Places
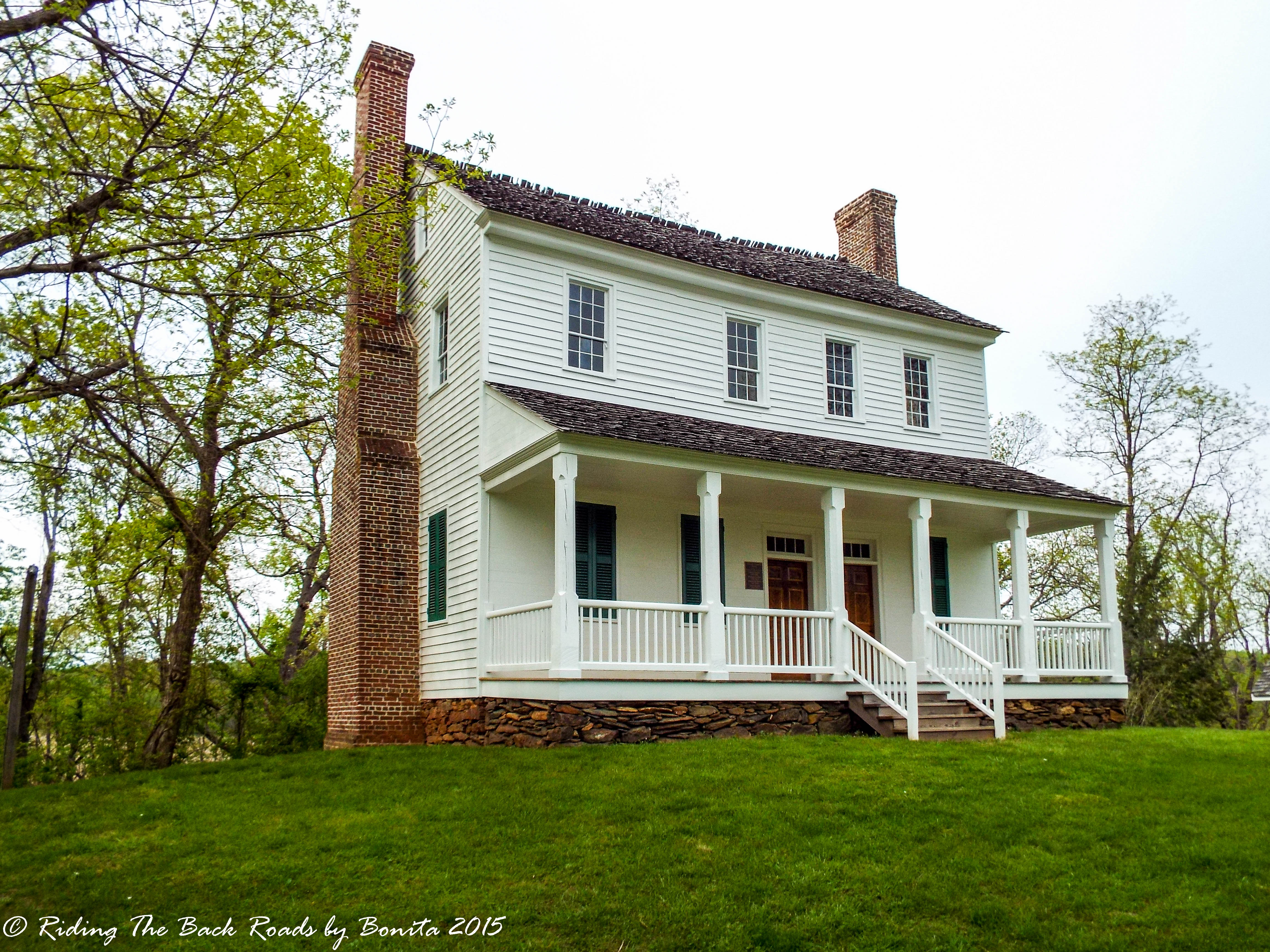

- Location within North Carolina Location within the United States
- Location: Northwest of Dobson on SR 1331, near Dobson, North Carolina
- Coordinates: 36°27′24″N 80°49′13″W
- Area: 4 acres (1.6 ha)
- Built: 1799
- Architectural style: Georgian, Federal
- NRHP reference No.: 73001369
- Added to NRHP: April 24, 1973

The Edwards–Franklin House is a plantation house in the Southern United States located in Franklin Township, Surry County, North Carolina. It was built in 1799 by Gideon Edwards and was later occupied by congressional representative Meshack Franklin, brother of North Carolina governor Jesse Franklin (1820–1821). The house was restored by the Surry County Historical Society in 1973 and is open to visitors.

It was added to the National Register of Historic Places in 1973.
