= Hotel Franklin =

- U.S. National Register of Historic Places
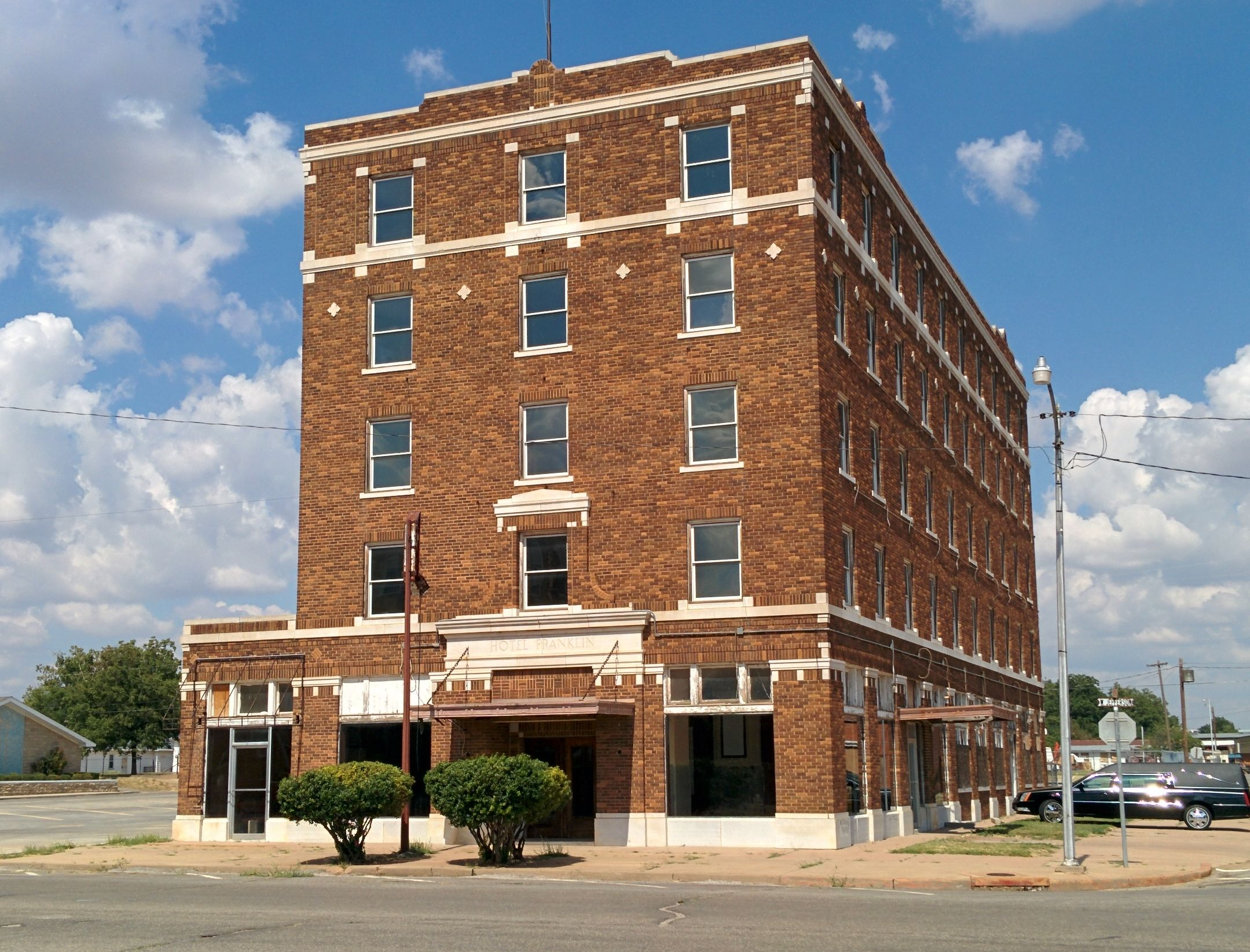

- Location within Oklahoma Location within the United States
- Location: 217 West Jefferson, Mangum, Oklahoma
- Coordinates: 34°52′26″N 99°30′23″W
- Area: less than one acre
- Built: 1929
- Built by: McMillen-Shelton Co.
- Architect: Layton, Hicks & Forsyth
- Architectural style: Late 19th and 20th Century Revivals, Late 19th And Early 20th Century American Movements
- NRHP reference No.: 07000520
- Added to NRHP: May 31, 2007

The Hotel Franklin, at 217 West Jefferson in Mangum, Oklahoma, was built in 1929. It was listed on the National Register of Historic Places in 2007.

It is a five-story, red brick building located at the northwest comer of Mangum's town square, specifically at the northwest corner of West Jefferson Street and West Commerce Alley.

It was designed by architects Layton, Hicks & Forsyth and was built by contractor McMillen-Shelton Co. It is 51 by 112 feet (16 m × 34 m) in plan and is generally Renaissance Revival in style, with elements of classical and Mediterranean motifs. It has a three-part form of some skyscrapers, with base, shaft and capital. It has a reinforced concrete frame, with hollow clay tile curtain walls, sheathed in break. Carthage stone is used for trim. The hotel is topped by a neon "Hotel Franklin" sign.
